= List of African poets =

This is a list of African poets. Contemporary Africa has a range of important poets across many different genres and cultures. Poetry in Africa details more on the history and context of contemporary poetry on the continent.

== A ==
- Chris Abani, Nigeria
- Maria do Carmo Abecassis, Mozambique
- Mohammed Abed Elhai, Sudan
- Lionel Abrahams, South Africa
- P. A. K. Aboagye, Ghana
- Mohammed Achaari, Morocco
- Chinua Achebe, Nigeria
- Catherine Obianuju Acholonu, Nigeria
- Elhadi Adam, Sudan
- Toyin Adewale-Gabriel, Nigeria
- Tatamkulu Afrika, South Africa
- Ama Ata Aidoo, Ghana
- Funso Aiyejina, Nigeria
- Grace Akello, Uganda
- Mohammed ibn Mohammed Alami, Morocco
- Mohammed ibn Idris al-Amrawi, Morocco
- Kaddour El Alamy, Morocco
- Abu Salim al-Ayyashi, Morocco
- Sebastião Alba, Mozambique
- Mike Alfred, South Africa
- AlKabli, Sudan
- Akilu Aliyu, Nigeria
- Al-Saddiq Al-Raddi, Sudan
- Abdulkareem Baba Aminu, Nigeria
- Jean Amrouche, Algeria
- Ingrid Andersen, South Africa
- Tyrone Appollis, South Africa
- Eseohe Arhebamen (a.k.a. Edoheart), Nigeria
- Khadambi Asalache, Kenya
- Nana Asma'u, Nigeria
- Hennie Aucamp, South Africa
- Mohammed Awzal, Morocco
- Ayo Ayoola-Amale, Nigeria
- Ali Azaykou, Morocco
- Étienne Azéma, Réunion
- Jean-Henri Azéma, Réunion
- Nnorom Azuonye, Nigeria

== B ==
- Mildred Barya, Uganda
- Ali Birra, Ethiopia
- J. Benibengor Blay, Ghana
- Kwesi Brew, Ghana
- Angèle Bassolé-Ouédraogo, Côte d'Ivoire
- Tanella Boni, Côte d'Ivoire
- Ali Bu'ul, Somaliland
- Mohammed Ben Brahim, Morocco
- Siham Benchekroun, Morocco
- Abdelmajid Benjelloun, Morocco
- Hafsa Bikri, Morocco
- Al-Buzidi al-Bujrafi, Morocco
- Philip Begho, Nigeria
- Alioune Badara Bèye, Senegal
- Gabeba Baderoon, South Africa
- Shabbir Banoobhai, South Africa
- Sinclair Beiles, South Africa
- Robert Berold, South Africa
- Vonani Bila, South Africa
- Peter Blum, South Africa
- Roy Blumenthal, South Africa
- Tanella Boni, Côte d'Ivoire
- Breyten Breytenbach, South Africa
- Dennis Brutus, South Africa
- Abena Busia, Ghana
- Akosua Busia, Ghana
- Guy Butler, South Africa

== C ==
- Robert Calvert, South Africa
- Roy Campbell, South Africa
- Gladys Casely-Hayford, Ghana
- Jan F. E. Celliers, South Africa
- Steve Chimombo, Mali
- Chirikure Chirikure, Zimbabwe
- Yvette Christiansë, South Africa
- Charl Cilliers, South Africa
- J. P. Clark Nigeria
- Jack Cope, South Africa
- Mia Couto, Mozambique
- Jeni Couzyn, South Africa
- José Craveirinha, Mozambique
- Jeremy Cronin, South Africa
- Patrick Cullinan, South Africa
- Gary Cummiskey, South Africa
- Sheila Cussons, South Africa
- Chijioke Amu-Nnadi, Nigeria

== D ==
- Mohammed Dib, Algeria
- Tahar Djaout, Algeria
- Viriato da Cruz, Angola
- Bernadette Sanou Dao, Burkina Faso
- Mbella Sonne Dipoko, Cameroon
- Kwame Dawes, Ghana
- Bernard Binlin Dadié, Côte d'Ivoire
- Fily Dabo Sissoko, Mali
- Souéloum Diagho, Mali
- David Diop, Senegal
- Achmat Dangor, South Africa
- Johann de Lange, South Africa
- Dertigers, South Africa
- Phillippa Yaa de Villiers, South Africa
- Isobel Dixon, South Africa
- Angifi Dladla, South Africa
- Finuala Dowling, South Africa
- Saddiq Dzukogi, Nigeria

== E ==
- Michael Echeruo, Nigeria
- Amatoritsero Ede, Nigeria
- Elisabeth Eybers, South Africa
- Bushra Elfadil, Sudan
- Mohammed Moftahh Elfitory, Sudan
- John Eppel, Zimbabwe

== F ==
- Femi Fani-Kayode, Nigeria
- Allal al-Fassi, Morocco
- Abd al-Rahman al-Fazazi, Morocco
- Achour Fenni, Algeria
- Diana Ferrus, South Africa
- Kite Fiqi, Somaliland
- Sheila Meiring Fugard, South Africa

== G ==
- Ahmed Gabyow, Somalia
- Gaariye, Somaliland
- Abdul Raheem Glailati, Sudan
- Keith Gottschalk, South Africa
- William Wellington Gqoba, South Africa
- Stephen Gray, South Africa
- Josué Guébo, Ivory Coast
- Mafika Gwala, South Africa

== H ==
- Hadraawi, Somalia
- Malek Haddad, Algeria
- Mohammed Abdullah Hassan, Somalia
- Gebre Hanna, Ethiopia
- Mohammed al-Haik, Morocco
- Beyene Haile, Eritrea
- Allal El Hajjam, Morocco
- Hamdun ibn al-Hajj al-Fasi, Morocco
- Mohammed al-Harraq al-Alami, Morocco
- David Hassine, Morocco
- Sulayman al-Hawwat, Morocco
- Dorian Haarhoff, Namibia
- Helon Habila, Nigeria
- Obo Aba Hisanjani, Nigeria
- Megan Hall, South Africa
- Joan Hambidge, South Africa
- Ernst van Heerden, South Africa
- C. M. van den Heever, South Africa
- Colleen Higgs, South Africa
- Christopher Hope, South Africa
- Peter Horn, South Africa
- Allan Kolski Horwitz, South Africa
- Chenjerai Hove, Zimbabwe

== I ==
- Ismail ibn al-Ahmar, Morocco
- Idriss ibn al-Hassan al-Alami, Morocco
- Ibn al-Khabbaza, Morocco
- Malik ibn al-Murahhal, Morocco
- Ahmad Ibn al-Qadi, Morocco
- Mohammed ibn Qasim ibn Zakur, Morocco
- Ibn Zaydan, Morocco
- Chinweizu Ibekwe, Nigeria
- Adamou Idé, Niger
- Abdi Bashir Indhobuur, Somalia
- I. D. du Plessis, South Africa
- Ibrahim 'Ali Salman, Sudan
- Salah Ahmed Ibrahim, Sudan

== J ==
- António Jacinto, Angola
- Abu al-Abbas al-Jarawi, Morocco
- Joseph ben Judah of Ceuta, Morocco
- Ahmed Joumari, Morocco
- John Jea, Nigeria
- Alan James, South Africa
- José Craveirinha, Mozambique
- Noémia de Sousa, Mozambique
- Wopko Jensma, South Africa
- Emmanuel Taiwo Jegede, Nigeria
- Liesl Jobson, South Africa
- Sarah Johnson, South Africa
- Ingrid Jonker, South Africa

== K ==
- Ajaib Kamal, Kenya
- Jonathan Kariara, Kenya
- Bai T. Moore, Liberia
- Stanley Onjezani Kenani, Malawi
- Mohammed Khammar Kanouni, Morocco
- Mohammed Khaïr-Eddine, Morocco
- Aryan Kaganof, South Africa
- Anne Kellas, South Africa
- Keorapetse Kgositsile, South Africa
- Ntšeliseng ʻMasechele Khaketla, Lesotho
- Sheila Khala, Lesotho
- Mbongeni Khumalo, South Africa
- Olga Kirsch, South Africa
- Uys Krige, South Africa
- Antjie Krog, South Africa
- Anton Robert Krueger, South Africa
- Mazisi Kunene, South Africa
- Abdellatif Laabi, Morocco
- Wafaa Lamrani, Morocco
- Ahmed Lemsih, Morocco
- Mandla Langa, South Africa
- Cornelis Jacobus Langenhoven, South Africa
- Pule Lechesa, South Africa
- C. Louis Leipoldt, South Africa
- Douglas Livingstone, South Africa
- Nicolaas Petrus van Wyk Louw, South Africa
- W. E. G. Louw, South Africa
- Taban Lo Liyong, Sudan

== M ==
- Christopher Mwashinga, Tanzania
- Marjorie Oludhe Macgoye, Kenya
- Jack Mapanje, Malawi
- Felix Mnthali, Malawi
- Ahmed al-Madini, Morocco
- Abdelaziz al-Maghrawi, Morocco
- Abderrahman El Majdoub, Morocco
- Abdelaziz al-Malzuzi, Morocco
- Zindzi Mandela, South Africa
- Zahra Mansouri, Morocco
- Dambudzo Marechera, Zimbabwe
- Barbara Masekela, South Africa
- Al-Masfiwi, Morocco
- Lebogang Mashile, South Africa
- Dada Masiti, Somalia
- Thami Mdaghri, Morocco
- Ahmed Mejjati, Morocco
- Gcina Mhlophe, South Africa
- Lucien Xavier Michel-Andrianarahinjaka, Madagascar
- Mohammed Bennis, Morocco
- Peya Mushelenga, Namibia
- Mohammed al-Mokhtar Soussi, Morocco
- Rozena Maart, South Africa
- Kim McClenaghan, South Africa
- Michelle McGrane, South Africa
- Don Maclennan, South Africa
- Muhammad Ahmad Mahgoub, Sudan
- D. F. Malherbe, South Africa
- Clinton Marius, South Africa
- John Mateer, South Africa
- Don Mattera, South Africa
- Mulumba Ivan Matthias, Uganda
- John Matshikiza, South Africa
- James Matthews, South Africa
- Mzwakhe Mbuli, South Africa
- Joan Metelerkamp, South Africa
- Ruth Miller, South Africa
- Amitabh Mitra, South Africa
- Kobus Moolman, South Africa
- Rose Moss, South Africa
- Isabella Motadinyane, South Africa
- Modikwe Dikobe, South Africa
- Samuel Edward Krune Mqhayi, South Africa
- Fadhy Mtanga, Tanzania
- Oswald Mbuyiseni Mtshali, South Africa
- Malkat Ed-Dar Mohamed, Sudan
- Tumi Molekane, Tanzania
- Mukotani Rugyendo, Uganda
- Micere Githae Mugo, Kenya
- Hassan Sheikh Mumin Somalia
- Solomon Mutswairo, Zimbabwe
- Togara Muzanenhamo, Zimbabwe
- Rasaq Malik, Nigeria

== N ==
- Hans Daniel Namuhuja, Namibia
- Mririda n'Ait Attik, Morocco
- Okey Ndibe, Nigeria
- Uche Nduka, Nigeria
- Echezonachukwu Nduka, Nigeria
- Mũkoma wa Ngũgĩ, Kenya
- Mostafa Nissaboury, Morocco
- Arthur Nortje, South Africa
- Pitika Ntuli, South Africa

== O ==
- Chike Obi, Nigeria
- Okello Oculi, Uganda
- Odia Ofeimun, Nigeria
- Tanure Ojaide, Nigeria
- Atukwei Okai, Ghana
- Gabriel Okara, Nigeria
- Diego Odoh Okenyodo, Nigeria
- Christopher Okigbo, Nigeria
- Ben Okri, Nigeria
- Olatubosun Oladapo, Nigeria
- Onwuchekwa Jemie, Nigeria
- D. J. Opperman, South Africa
- Niyi Osundare, Nigeria
- Romeo Oriogun, Nigeria

== P ==
- Okot p'Bitek, Uganda
- Nii Ayikwei Parkes, Ghana
- Shailja Patel, Kenya
- Lenrie Peters, Gambia
- William Plomer, South Africa
- Louis-Marie Pouka, Cameroon
- Karen Press, South Africa

== Q ==
- Alfred Themba Qabula, South Africa

== R ==
- Lesego Rampolokeng, South Africa
- Esther Razanadrasoa (1892–1931), Madagascar
- Francis William Reitz, South Africa
- Rustum Kozain, South Africa
- Gely Abdel Rahman, Sudan
- Ras Nas, Tanzania
- Shaaban Bin Robert, Tanzania
- David Rubadiri, Malawi

== S ==
- Peter M. Sacks, South Africa
- Abdelhadi Said, Morocco
- Arja Salafranca, South Africa
- Tijan M. Sallah, Gambia
- Dina Salústio, Cabo Verde
- Francisco Santos, Angola
- Mabel Segun, Nigeria
- Jean Sénac, Algeria
- Léopold Sédar Senghor, Senegal
- Sipho Sepamla, South Africa
- Sjaka Septembir, South Africa
- Mohamed Serghini, Morocco
- Mongane Wally Serote, South Africa
- Shaykh Sufi, Somalia
- Warsan Shire, Somalia
- Lola Shoneyin, Nigeria
- Si Mohand, Algeria
- Ari Sitas, South Africa
- Adam Small, South Africa
- Noémia de Sousa, Mozambique
- Wole Soyinka, Nigeria
- Lina Spies, South Africa
- Bakari Sumano, Mali
- Efua Sutherland, Ghana
- Tendai M. Shaba, Malawi

== T ==
- Abdelkarim Tabbal, Morocco
- Véronique Tadjo, Côte d'Ivoire
- Hemmou Talb, Morocco
- Eugène Terre'Blanche, South Africa
- Abdillahi Suldaan Mohammed Timacade, Somalia
- Frédéric Pacéré Titinga, Burkina Faso
- Mohamud Siad Togane, Somalia
- Totius, South Africa
- Houcine Toulali, Morocco
- Aida Touré, Gabon

== V ==
- Mamman Jiya Vatsa, Nigeria
- Benedict Wallet Vilakazi, South Africa
- Wayne Visser, South Africa
- Gert Vlok Nel, South Africa

== W ==
- Patricia Jabbeh Wesley, Liberia
- Phillis Wheatley, Gambia or Senegal
- Crystal Warren, South Africa
- Stephen Watson, South Africa
- Mary Morison Webster, South Africa
- George Weideman, South Africa
- Ngudia Wendel, Angola
- Hein Willemse, South Africa
- David Wright, South Africa
- Christopher van Wyk, South Africa
- Chapanga Wilson, Tanzania

== X ==
- Makhosazana Xaba, South Africa
- Cali Xuseen Xirsi, Somalia

== Y ==
- Mvula ya Nangolo, Namibia
- Shadya Yasin, Somalia

== Z ==
- Mohamed Zafzaf, Morocco
- Moufdi Zakaria, Algeria
- Abed Elrahim Abu Zakrra, Sudan
- Musaemura Zimunya, Zimbabwe
- Abdallah Zrika, Morocco
