= List of South African poets =

This is a list of noted South African poets, poets born or raised in South Africa, whether living there or overseas, and writing in one of the South African languages.

== A-C ==
- Tatamkulu Afrika
- Mike Alfred
- Ingrid Andersen
- Gabeba Baderoon
- Sinclair Beiles
- Robert Berold
- Vonani Bila
- Roy Blumenthal
- Herman Charles Bosman
- Breyten Breytenbach
- André Brink
- Dennis Brutus
- Guy Butler
- Roy Campbell
- Charl Cilliers
- Johnny Clegg
- Jack Cope
- Jeremy Cronin
- Patrick Cullinan
- Gary Cummiskey
- Sheila Cussons

== D-G ==
- Achmat Dangor
- Ingrid de Kok
- Phillippa Yaa de Villiers
- Annesu de Vos
- Modikwe Dikobe
- Isobel Dixon
- Angifi Dladla
- Finuala Dowling
- I D du Plessis
- Koos du Plessis
- Elisabeth Eybers
- Kingsley Fairbridge
- Gus Ferguson
- Sheila Meiring Fugard
- Keith Gottschalk
- Stephen Gray
- Mafika Gwala

== H-M ==
- Megan Hall
- Joan Hambidge
- Colleen Higgs
- Christopher Hope
- Peter Horn
- Allan Kolski Horwitz
- Alan James
- Wopko Jensma
- Liesl Jobson
- Sarah Johnson
- Ingrid Jonker
- Aryan Kaganof
- Anne Kellas
- Keorapetse Kgositsile
- Olga Kirsch
- Koos Kombuis
- Rustum Kozain
- Uys Krige
- Antjie Krog
- Anton Krueger
- Mazisi Kunene
- Cornelis Jacobus Langenhoven
- C. Louis Leipoldt
- Douglas Livingstone
- Lindiwe Mabuza
- Don Maclennan
- Mzi Mahola
- Lucas Malan
- Eugène Marais
- Andrew Martens
- Lebogang Mashile
- John Mateer
- Don Mattera
- James Matthews
- Mzwakhe Mbuli
- Kim McClenaghan
- Michelle McGrane
- Sheila Meiring Fugard
- Joan Metelerkamp
- Ruth Miller
- Amitabh Mitra
- Natalia Molebatsi
- Kobus Moolman
- Isabella Motadinyane
- Seitlhamo Motsapi
- Casey Motsisi
- S.E.K. Mqhayi
- Oswald Mtshali

== N-S ==
- Arthur Nortje
- D. J. Opperman
- William Plomer
- Karen Press
- Thomas Pringle
- N.S. Puleng
- Lesego Rampolokeng
- Azila Talit Reisenberger
- Robert Royston
- Gerard Rudolf
- Arja Salafranca
- Sipho Sepamla
- Mongane Wally Serote
- Ari Sitas
- Douglas Reid Skinner
- Adam Small
- Kelwyn Sole

== T-Z ==
- Totius
- Ernst van Heerden
- Christopher van Wyk
- Benedict Wallet Vilakazi
- A.G. Visser
- Wayne Visser
- Gert Vlok Nel
- Crystal Warren
- Stephen Watson
- Mary Morison Webster
- George Weideman
- Athol Williams
- David Wright
- Makhosazana Xaba

== See also ==
- List of poets
- List of South African writers
- South African literature
- South African poetry
