= The Penguin Book of Modern African Poetry =

1984 poetry anthology book

The Penguin Book of Modern African Poetry (in an earlier 1963 edition Modern Poetry from Africa) is a 1984 poetry anthology edited by Gerald Moore and Ulli Beier. It consists mainly of poems written in English and English translations of French or Portuguese poetry; poems written in African languages were included only in the authors' translations. The poems are arranged by the country of the poet, then by their date of birth. The following sections list the poets included in the collection.

== Angola ==
- Agostinho Neto (1922 – 1979)
- António Jacinto (1924 – 1991)
- Costa Andrade (not to be confused with Manuel da Costa Andrade)
- Ngudia Wendel
- Jofre Rocha, pseudonym of Roberto Francisco de Almeida (1941)
- Ruy Duarte de Carvalho (1941 – 2010)

== Benin (Dahomey) ==
- Emile Ologoudou

== Cameroun ==
- Simon Mpondo
- Mbella Sonne Dipoko
- Patrice Kayo

== Cape Verde Islands ==
- Onésima Silveira

== Congo Republic ==
- Tchicaya U Tam’si
- Jean-Baptiste Tati Loutard
- Emmanuel Dongala

== Côte d'Ivoire ==
- Joseph Miezan Bognini
- Charles Nokan

== Gambia ==
- Lenrie Peters

== Ghana ==
- Ellis Ayitey Komey
- Kwesi Brew
- Kofi Awoonor
- Atukwei Okai
- Kofi Anyidoho

== Guinea ==
- Ahmed Tidjani Cissé

== Kenya ==
- Khadambi Asalache
- Jonathan Kariara
- Jared Angira

== Madagascar ==
- Jean-Joseph Rabearivelo
- Flavien Ranaivo

== Malawi ==
- David Rubadiri
- Felix Mnthali
- Jack Mapanje

== Mali ==
- Yambo Ouologuem

== Mauretania ==
- Oumar Ba

== Mauritius ==
- Edouard Maunick

== Mozambique ==
- José Craveirinha
- Noémia de Sousa
- Valente Malangatana
- Jorge Rebelo

== Nigeria ==
- Gabriel Okara
- Christopher Okigbo
- Wole Soyinka
- John Pepper Clark
- Frank Aig-Imoukhuede
- Okogbuli Wonodi
- Michael Echeruo
- Pol N Ndu
- Onwuchekwa Jemie
- Aig Higo
- Molara Ogundipe-Leslie
- Niyi Osundare
- Odia Ofeimun
- Funso Aiyejina

== San Tomé ==
- Alda do Espirito Santo

== Senegal ==
- Léopold Sédar Senghor
- Birago Diop
- David Diop

== Sierra Leone ==
- Syl Cheney-Coker

== South Africa ==
- Dennis Brutus
- Mazisi Kunene
- Sipho Sepamla
- Keorapetse Kgositsile
- Oswald Mbuyiseni Mtshali
- Arthur Nortje
- Mongane Wally Serote

== Uganda ==
- Okot p'Bitek

== Zaire ==
- Antoine-Rober Bolamba
- Mukala Kadima-Nzuji

== Zambia ==
- Gwendoline Konie
