= Modjaji Books =

South African independent publisher

- Founded: 2007; 19 years ago
- Founder: Colleen Higgs
- Headquarters location: Cape Town, South Africa
- Publication types: Books
- Nonfiction topics: Writings of South African women
- Official website: modjajibooks.co.za

Modjaji Books is a South African small-scale independent publisher, based in Cape Town. Started in 2007 by Colleen Higgs, it is an independent press that publishes the writings of Southern African women.

Many Modjaji titles have gone on to be nominated for and to win prestigious literary awards both in South Africa and internationally.

Modjaji Books publishes books written exclusively by Southern African women. Currently, the company publishes short stories, memoir, novels, poetry, and creative non-fiction.

Modjaji Books aims to fill a gap by providing an independent outlet for serious writing by women: "From poetry to biography to fiction, there will be an outlet for writing by women that takes itself – and its readers – seriously."

The Modjaji Books blog is frequently updated and features reviews, news, articles and insights on South African publishing. The blog is available on Books LIVE.

== Selected publications ==
- A Saving Bannister by Wendy Woodward
- Accident by Dawn Garisch
- Absent Tongues by Kelwyn Sole
- A lioness at my heels by Robin Winckel-Mellish
- At Least the Duck Survived by Margaret Clough
- The Attribute of Poetry by Elisa Galgut
- An A to Z of Amazing South African Women by Ambre Nicolson
- The Bed Book of Short Stories by Joanne Hichens
- Balthasar's Gift by Charlotte Otter
- Bare & Breaking by Karin Schimke
- Bom Boy by Yewande Omotoso
- Beyond Touch by Arja Salafranca
- Burnt Offering by Joan Metelerkamp
- Bearings by Isobel Dixon
- Conduit by Sarah Frost
- The Chameleon House by Melissa de Villiers
- The Cry of the Hangkaka by Anne Woodborne
- Do Not Go Gentle by Futhi Ntshingila
- Difficult to Explain by Finuala Dowling
- The Everyday Wife by Phillippa Yaa de Villiers
- Fourth Child by Megan Hall (Winner of the Ingrid Jonker prize)
- Flame and Song: a memoir by Phillippa Kabali-Kagwa
- Grace by Barbara Boswell
- Go Tell the Sun by Wame Molefhe
- Homegrown by Christine Coates
- How to open the door by Marike Beyers
- Hemispheres by Karen Lazar
- Hester's Book of Bread by Hester van der Walt
- Hester se Brood by Hester van der Walt
- I'm the Girl Who Was Raped by Michelle Hattingh
- Invisible Earthquake by Malika Ndlovu
- Ice cream headache in my bone by Phillippa Yaa de Villiers
- Jabulani Means Rejoice by Phumzile Simelane Kalumba
- Karkloof Blue by Charlotte Otter
- Life in Translation by Azila Talit Reisenberger
- The Last to Leave by Margaret Clough
- The Love Sheet by Jacques Coetzee and Barbara Fairhead
- Love Interrupted by Reneilwe Malatji
- My First Time by Jen Thorpe
- Messages from the Bees by Robin Winckel-Mellish
- Namaste Life by Ishara Maharaj
- Now Following You by Fiona Snyckers
- Now I See You by Priscilla Holmes
- Now the World Takes these Breaths by Joan Metelerkamp
- Nomme 20 Delphi Straat by Shirmoney Rhode
- Oleander by Fiona Zerbst
- Outside the Lines by Ameera Patel
- Please, Take Photographs by Sindiwe Magona
- Piece Work by Ingrid Andersen
- Running & other stories by Makhosazana Xaba
- Riding the Samoosa Express by Zaheera Jina and Hasina Asvat
- Remnants, Restante, Reste by Annette Snyckers
- Strange Fruit by Helen Moffett
- Serurunbele by Katleho Kano Shoro
- Signs for an exhibition by Eliza Kentridge
- The Suitable Girl by Michelle McGrane
- Shooting Snakes by Maren Bodenstein
- Snake by Tracey Farren
- Swimming with Cobras by Rosemary Smith
- STRAY by Helen Moffett and Diane Awerbuck (editors)
- Sê my, is julle twee susters? by Hester van der Walt
- Secret Keeper by Kerry Hammerton
- Team Trinity by Fiona Snyckers
- The Turtle Dove Told Me by Thandi Sliepen
- These are the lies I told you by Kerry Hammerton
- Tess by Tracey Farren
- The Thin Line by Arja Salafranca
- This Day by Tiah Beautement
- This Place I Call Home by Meg Vandermerwe
- Tjieng Tjang Tjerries and other stories by Jolyn Phillips
- To the Black Women We All Knew by Kholofelo Maenetsha
- Unlikely by Colleen Crawford Cousins
- UnSettled and other stories by Sandra Hill
- Whiplash by Tracey Farren (shortlisted for the 2009 Sunday Times Fiction prize)
- Witch Girl by Tanvi Bush
