= Poetry in Africa =

African poetry encompasses a wide variety of traditions arising from Africa's 55 countries and from evolving trends within different literary genres. The field is complex, primarily because of Africa's original linguistic and cultural diversity and partly because of the effects of slavery and colonisation, the believe in religion and social life which resulted in English, Portuguese and French, as well as creole or pidgin versions of these European languages, being spoken and written by Africans across the continent. Poetry written by Africans mostly talks about either war or cultural difference. For instance, a poem like The Dining Table talk about war that happened in Sere Leon and poem like The Anvil and the Hammer also talks about cultural difference.

== Historical perspective ==
If African culture depends on community and social setting, it can be said that it "grows out of tradition and keeps tradition alive". Present-day spoken-word and performance poetry can be viewed as "logical evolutions" of the ancient indigenous oral traditions. Since 2000, the Internet has also emerged as a publishing channel for the promotion of both written and performed African poetry.

=== Pre-colonial era ===
Numerous examples of pre-colonial African literature span the continent, from scripts documenting the kings of Ethiopian and Ghanaian empires and popular folklore, to Mali's famous Timbuktu Manuscripts, dating from the 16th to 18th centuries. In medieval times, the universities of North Africa amassed Arabic and Swahili literature.

In the pre-colonial era in Nigeria, poetry was thought to be unwritten. "There existed a thin line between poets and musicians, who composed and rendered poetry in musical form. Poets then published their works in the form of renditions at funerals and marriage ceremonies, with themes focused on praising virtues and condemning vices in society." Margaret Busby's 1992 anthology Daughters of Africa begins with a selection of traditional African poems, including ancient Egyptian love songs.

=== Colonial era ===
While the West bears record of African literature from the period of colonisation and the slave trade, particularly of works by Africans using acquired Western languages as their medium of expression, the oral traditions of the time – particularly if in a mother tongue – were not recognised for their artistic value or the richness and significance of their content.

Generated by the Atlantic slave trade and its opposition, from the 1780s onward, an unprecedented array of texts appeared, both pro- and anti-slavery. African authors writing in this period, along with abolitionists and apologists, raise questions about the relation of British Romanticism to colonialism and slavery. Themes of liberation, independence and négritude among Africans in French-controlled territories began to permeate African literature in the late colonial period, between the end of World War I and independence. Léopold Sédar Senghor published the first anthology of French-language poetry written by Africans in 1948. He was one of the leaders of the négritude movement and the eventual President of Senegal.

=== Independence era ===
Christopher Okigbo was killed in the 1960s' civil war in Nigeria; Mongane Wally Serote was detained under South Africa's Terrorism Act No. 83 of 1967; his countryman Arthur Norje committed suicide in London in 1970; Malawi's Jack Mapanje was incarcerated with neither charge nor trial; and in 1995, Ken Saro-Wiwa died by the gallows of the Nigerian junta.

Sam Awa of the University of Lagos' Department of English states: "Moreover, African literature is protest in nature. It comes as a reaction to various forms of injustices meted out on Africans by the colonial masters and later, post-colonial masters."

=== Post-colony ===
Most African nations gained their independence in the 1950s and 1960s. With liberation and increased literacy, African literature written in English, French, Portuguese and traditional African languages has increased and is now more recognized internationally.

In 1986, Nigerian writer, poet and playwright Wole Soyinka, became the first post-independence African writer to win the Nobel Prize in Literature.

=== Modern era ===
In modern African poetry, works that focus on the healing and purging of the country and families have frequently appeared.

In January 2000, "Against All Odds: African Languages and Literatures into the 21st Century", the first conference on African languages and literatures ever to be held in Africa, took place, with participants from the diaspora, writers and scholars from Africa and around the world. Delegates examined the state of African languages in literature scholarship, publishing, and education in Africa.

Poet and editor Kwame Dawes directed the African Poetry Book Fund and produced a series of chapbooks.

Joseph A. Ushie at the University of Uyo English Department, in Uyo, Akwa Ibom State, Nigeria, said that "Modern written African poetry has a double heritage — pre-colonial and Western. As in most post-colonial situations, the tilt of our writing should be more towards the pre-colonial African literary heritage as manifested in the song, dirge, folktale, elegy, panegyric or riddle. Essentially, such art was meant for the whole community rather than for a few initiates."

=== Publication ===
Over the last two decades, a number of anthologies of African poetry have been published, predominantly by international university presses and by African scholars based on or associated with these institutions. In his article "The Critical Reception of Modern African Poetry", Oyeniyi Okunoye of Obafemi Awolowo University, Ile-Ife, Nigeria, criticises publications such as Modern Poetry from Africa, co-edited by Gerald Moore and Ulli Beier (1963), and A Book of African Verse by John Reed and Clive Wake (1969), for "operating within a tradition that is pretentious in claiming the African identity for works that do not truly project diverse African experiences". More recent anthologies document the evolution of African poetry with more objectivity.

== See also ==
- African literature
- List of African poets
- List of Tanzanian poets
- List of Ghanaian poets
- List of Nigerian poets
- List of South African poets
- South African poetry
- Ebyevugo, poetry genre
- Pambazuka
- Badilisha Poetry X-Change and Badilisha Poetry Radio
- Africa Beyond
- Farafina Books
- Chimurenga (magazine)
- New Internationalist
- Wasafiri
- Kwani?
- Cassava Republic Press
