= Motsapi =

Motsapi could be both a masculine given name and a surname. Notable people with this name include:

- Motsapi Moorosi (1945–2013), Mosotho sprinter
- Seitlhamo Motsapi (born 1966), South African poet
