= List of Nigerian poets =

This is a list of notable poets from Nigeria.

== A ==
- Chris Abani
- Chinua Achebe
- Catherine Obianuju Acholonu
- Bayo Adebowale
- Toyin Adewale-Gabriel
- Funso Aiyejina
- Tolu Ajayi
- Tolu Akinyemi
- Akilu Aliyu
- Abdulkareem Baba Aminu
- Nana Asma’u (1793–1864)
- Nnorom Azuonye
- Sueddie Agema
- Adedayo Agarau
- Yewande Akinse

== B ==
- Solomon Babalola
- Lindsay Barrett
- Philip Begho

== C ==
- John Pepper Clark
- Chijioke Amu-Nnadi
- Barmani Choge

== E ==
- Michael Echeruo
- Amatoritsero Ede
- Edoheart

== F ==
- Femi Fani-Kayode
- Peter Fatomilola

== G ==
- Alhaji Garba Gashuwa
- Bakare Gbadamosi

== H ==
- Helon Habila
- Obo Aba Hisanjani

== I ==
- Tade Ipadeola

== J ==
- John Jea
- Onwuchekwa Jemie

== L ==
- Logan February

== M ==
- Mamman Shata
- Muhammad Bello dan Fodio

== N ==
- Okey Ndibe
- Echezonachukwu Nduka
- Uche Nduka

== O ==
- Godspower Oboido
- Odia Ofeimun
- Dr. Tanure Ojaide
- Gabriel Okara
- Diego Odoh Okenyodo
- Christopher Okigbo
- Ben Okri
- Olatubosun Oladapo
- Sam Oritsetimeyin Omatseye
- Dennis Osadebay
- Okinba Launko a.k.a. Femi Osofisan
- Niyi Osundare

== R ==
- Remi Raji
- Romeo Oriogun

== S ==
- Ken Saro-Wiwa
- Mabel Segun
- Lola Shoneyin
- Wole Soyinka

== U ==
- Uchechukwu Peter Umezurike
- Rems Umeasiegbu
- Uthman dan Fodio

== V ==
- Mamman Jiya Vatsa
- Jumoke Verissimo
