= Poetry Africa =

Poetry festival in Durban, South Africa

Poetry Africa is an international poetry festival held annually in Durban, South Africa.

More than twenty poets, predominantly from South Africa and elsewhere on the African continent, participate in the seven- to ten-day Poetry Africa, an international poetry festival that is based mostly in Durban, South Africa, during the final quarter of the year. The festival's extensive programme includes theatre performances, readings, music and book launches, with a festival finale at BAT Centre. Day activities include seminars, workshops, open mic opportunities, and school visits.

Poetry Africa is organized by the Centre for Creative Arts, which is a multi-disciplinary arts organisation within the Faculty of Human Sciences at the University of KwaZulu-Natal in Durban. From the CCA Mission statement:

The Centre fulfils a function as facilitator, promoter, networker, and capacity builder, and plays a vital role in bringing to fruition the artistic potential of the region. The CCA co-ordinates four annual festivals which are the foremost of their kind in the region; Time of the Writer, Poetry Africa, the Durban International Film Festival, and the JOMBA! Contemporary Dance Festival. The CCA is also involved in other projects and programmes. These festivals reflect artistic integrity, are professionally produced, and receive excellent media coverage. All have strong international links that enhance intercultural artistic relationships with and within South Africa, the African continent, and the global community. All activities have important development components that reach into communities that do not have access to top-level art practitioners such as those participating in our festivals. Schools and tertiary institutions are a particular focus; as are grass roots community arts organisations.

More than 300 poets and writers have attended the festival in its 15 editions, including:

- Chris Abani, 2002
- Didier Awadi, 2011
- Gabeba Baderoon, 2005
- Dennis Brutus, multiple years
- Sutardji Calzoum Bachri, 2004
- Gary Cummiskey, 2008
- Megan Hall (poet), 2008
- Kwame Dawes, 2011
- Bob Holman, 2003
- Stanley Onjezani Kenani, 2007
- Werewere Liking, 2004
- Myroslav Laiuk, 2018
- Gcina Mhlope, multiple years
- Bantu Mwaura, 2008 (also for Poetry Africa at the World Social Forum, Kenya 2007)
- Pitika Ntuli, multiple years
- Lesego Rampolokeng, multiple years
- Mamta Sagar, 2005
- Benjamin Zephaniah, 2000, 2006

== See also ==
- List of South African writers
- List of South African poets
- South African poetry
