= Mary Morrison =

Mary Morrison may refer to:

- Mary Anna Jackson née Morrison (1831–1915), wife of Stonewall Jackson
- Mary Morrison (courtier) (born 1937), lady-in-waiting to Elizabeth II
- Mary Lane Morrison (1907–1994), American preservationist
- Mary Louise Morrison (born 1926), Canadian soprano, see 1926 in Canada
- Mary Morison or Morrison (1771–1791), Scottish girl thought to be the "lovely Mary Morison" of Robert Burns' poem
- Mary Morison Webster (1894–1980), Scottish-born South African novelist and poet
