= Gary Cummiskey =

South African poet and publisher

Gary Cummiskey (born 1963) is a South African poet and publisher.

== Life ==
Cummiskey was born in England and moved to South Africa in 1969 with his family for a few years and he returned in 1983 as an adult. He is the founder and editor of Dye Hard Press, which, since 1994, has published writers such as Khulile Nxumalo, Gail Dendy, Arja Salafranca, Alan Finlay, Philip Zhuwao, Roy Blumenthal, Gus Ferguson, Kobus Moolman, Pravasan Pillay, Graeme Feltham and Allan Kolski Horwitz. He edited Green Dragon literary journal from 2002 to 2009.

Cummiskey is co-editor with Eva Kowalska of Who was Sinclair Beiles? published by Dye Hard Press in 2009. A revised and expanded edition was published in 2014. Also in 2009, Cummiskey compiled Beauty Came Grovelling Forward, a selection of South African poetry and prose published online at www.bigbridge.org.

He was a participant in the 2008 Poetry Africa International Festival held in Durban, South Africa.

Through Dye Hard Press, Cummiskey published an anthology of South African short fiction, The Edge of Things, selected by Arja Salafranca, in 2011.

Cummiskey's work has been translated into Arabic, French, Bangla and Greek. Three of his poems have inspired short films.

He published a book of short fiction, Off-ramp, in 2013. The collection was shortlisted for the Nadine Gordimer Short Story Award 2014.

From 2014 to 2016 he was editor of the South African poetry journal New Coin, which is published by the Institute for the Study of English in Africa, at Rhodes University, Grahamstown.

== Bibliography ==
- Poetry
  - The Secret Hour, Dye Hard Press, Johannesburg,1994
  - Lost in a World, Dye Hard Press, Johannesburg, 1994
  - Visitations, Dye Hard Press, Johannesburg, 1995
  - River of Dreams, Dye Hard Press, Johannesburg, 1995
  - City, Sun Belly Press, Johannesburg, 1995
  - When Apollinaire Died, Firfield Press, Plumstead, 1996
  - Head (with Roy Blumenthal), Dye Hard Press, Johannesburg, 1998
  - Reigning Gloves, Dye Hard Press, Johannesburg, 2000
  - Bog Docks, Dye Hard Press, Johannesburg, 2005
  - Today is their Creator, Dye Hard Press, Johannesburg, 2008
  - Romancing the Dead, Tearoom Books, Durban, 2009
  - Sky Dreaming, Graffiti, Kolkata, India, 2011
  - I Remain Indoors, Tearoom Books, Stockholm, 2013
  - Don't Stop Until Incinerated, Tearoom Books, Stockholm, 2016
  - In Naked Field, Concrete Poets Press, Leicester, England, 2019
  - Thunder on the highway, Dye Hard Press, Johannesburg, 2020
  - Outside the cave: selected poems, Dye Hard Press, Johannesburg, 2021
  - Somewhere else, Graffiti, Kolkata, India, 2024
- Non-fiction
  - Conspiracies of the Interior: a surrealist film scenario, Dye Hard Press, Johannesburg, 1995
  - Who was Sinclair Beiles?, with Eva Kowalska, Dye Hard Press, Johannesburg, 2009. Revised and expanded edition, 2014
  - Renegade eye: collages, Turquoise Press, Johannesburg, 2025
- Fiction
  - April in the Moon-Sun, Dye Hard Press, Johannesburg, 2006
  - Off-ramp, Dye Hard Press, Johannesburg, 2013
  - The bogeyman, Samizdat Press, Johannesburg, 2026
