= Douglas Reid Skinner =

South African writer, editor, translator and poet

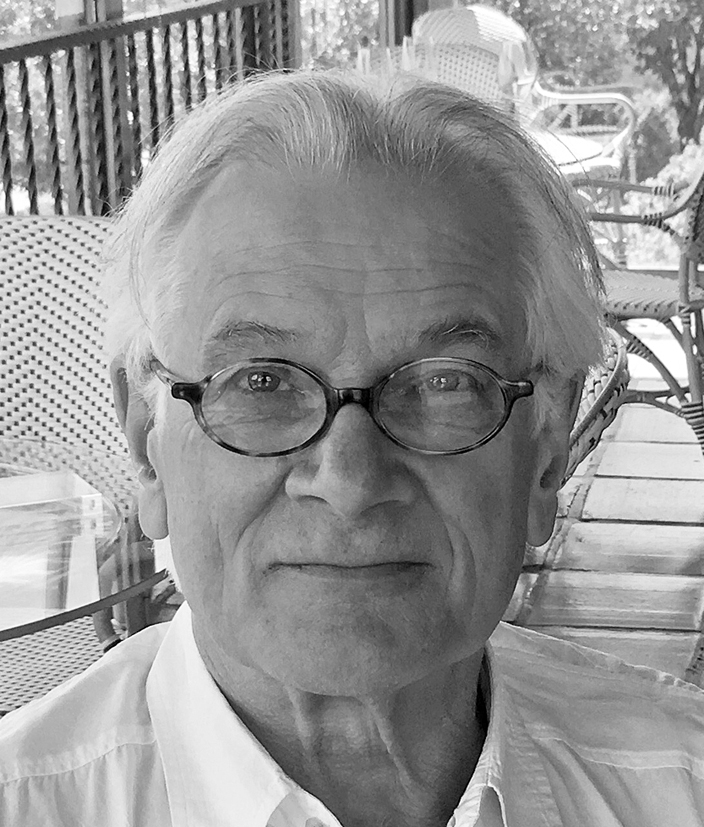
- Born: 1949 (age 76–77); Upington, South Africa
- Occupations: Writer, editor, translator, poet
- Spouse: Hilary Ivory
- Website: douglasreidskinner.com

Douglas Reid Skinner is a South African writer, editor, translator and poet. He was born in 1949 in Upington, in the Northern Cape province of South Africa.

== Literary career ==
Skinner has published seven collections of poems, the most recent of which was Liminal, published by uHlanga in 2017.

His poems have appeared in magazines in South Africa, The United Kingdom, America, Italy and France (including American Poetry Review, Carapace, Comparative Criticism, New Coin, New Contrast, Outposts, Stanzas, TriQuarterly and Verse).

=== As translator ===
He has translated (on his own or with a co-translator) various works from Afrikaans, French, Hebrew, Italian and Portuguese.

Recent translations

- (With Marco Fazzini) The Secret Ambition: Selected Poems of Valerio Magrelli (African Sun Press, 2016)
- English section of poems by Marco Fazzini translated from the Italian, 21 Poesie/Poemas/Poems (Amos Edizioni, Italy, 2017)

== Editing and publishing ==
From late 1986 to early 1989 Skinner was a compiler of The Contemporary Muse for the SABC (1986–89), a weekly half-hour broadcast of poetry on the ‘A’ programme.

He also created and directed The Carrefour Press (1988–1992), publishing over twenty collections of poetry, including such authors as Basil du Toit, John Eppel, Gus Ferguson, Douglas Livingstone, Ruth Miller and Fiona Zerbst. The Carrefour Press also published novels, a collection of essays by Stephen Watson and non-fiction works by George Seferis and Marthinus Versfeld.

In the late 1980s and early 1990s he was a member of the adjudication panels for:

- National Festival of the Arts Poetry Competition
- English Association Narrative Poem Competition
- Sanlam Poetry Prize
- English Association Poetry Prize

=== As editor ===
- Editor of Contrast (one issue, 1974)
- Editor of Upstream (1987-1989)
- Editor of New Contrast (1990–1992)
- Founder and editor of South African Literary Review (1991–1992)
- Co-editor of Stanzas (with Patricia Schonstein, 2015–present)
- English editor and translator for the AVBOB Poetry Project (2017–present)

== Awards ==
A selection of Magelli translations (with Fazzini) was awarded joint-First Prize in the 1995–6 British Comparative Literature Association Open Translation Prize.

== Personal life ==
Skinner's family has lived in Cape Town, Grahamstown, Kimberley and East London. After school, he attended Rhodes University in Grahamstown. He has worked in retail sales, farming, life insurance, acting, mining & drilling, programming & systems analysis, the wine trade, design, publishing, and editing. He has lived in Cape Town, Johannesburg, London, New York and San Francisco. He married Hilary Ivory in 1988 and together they have one son.

== Bibliography ==
- Reassembling World (1981)
- The House in Pella District (1986)
- The Unspoken (1988)
- The Middle Years (1993)
- Blue Rivers (2011)
- Heaven: New and Selected Poems (2014)
- Liminal (2017)
- A Short Treatise on Mortality (2022)

=== Anthologised in ===
- The Paperbook of South African English Poetry, Michael Chapman, editor (1986, AD Donker)
- 25/25: Twenty-Five Years of English South African Poetry, David Bunyan, editor (1989, Institute for the Study of English in Africa)
- The Heart in Exile: South African Poetry in English, 1990-95, Leon de Kock & Ian Tromp, eds. (1996, Penguin Books)
- In the Country of the Heart: South African 1960-1996, Denis Hirson, editor (1997, Northwestern University Press, USA)
- The Lava of This Land, 1990-95, Leon de Kock & Ian Tromp, eds. (1996, Penguin Books)
- Poèms d’Afrique du Sud, Denis Hirson, editor (2001, éditions Unesco)
- Africa Ablaze! Poems & Prose Pieces of War & Civil Conflict, Patricia Schonstein ed. (African Sun Press, 2015)
- Heart of Africa! Poems of Love, Loss and Longing, Patricia Schonstein ed. (African Sun Press, 2017)
- Absolute Africa! An anthology of poems, Patricia Schonstein ed. (African Sun Press, 2018)
- McGregor Poetry Festival 2014 Anthology, Patricia Schonstein ed. (African Sun Press, 2015)
- McGregor Poetry Festival 2015 Anthology, Patricia Schonstein ed. (African Sun Press, 2016)
- McGregor Poetry Festival 2017 Anthology, Patricia Schonstein ed. (African Sun Press, 2018)
