= Sheila Khala =

- Born: 1990–1991; Khubetsoana, Lesotho
- Education: University of Lesotho; University of the Free State
- Occupations: Poet, author, motivational speaker
- Writing career
- Language: English
- Years active: 2007–present
- Notable works: Formula; My Pen Is a Socialite
- Website: sheilakhala.blogspot.com

Sheila Nomolanga Khala is one of the best-known poets from Lesotho. She is considered a "pioneer" of poetry in Lesotho and even founded a nationwide organization, Poetry is Alive. In addition, she is active in the South African poetry community.

== Biography ==
Khala was born and raised in Khubetsoana, Lesotho. When she was in Form E at Adventville High School, she participated in the Poetry Farm contest, and was named Lesotho's best poet.

In 2009, at the age of 19, she published her first book, Formula, which brought her new recognition in the Lesotho and South African poetry communities. After the launch of her first book, she moved to South Africa's Free State province to study statistics at the University of the Free State, and quickly became introduced to the poetry scene there, which she described as "enormous."

She stayed in South Africa for a while, performing in poetry shows and competitions across the country, before deciding to return home to Lesotho to nurture local poetry. She told the Lesotho Times:

"I am now working with Ultimate FM in trying to extract the raw poetry talent in high schools around Lesotho. It is part of my vision of educating, motivating and inspiring students in the use of English language. My third book will feature poems from those students. It will be called September: A Special Gift."

== Personal life ==
Khala is Christian, and is very open about her faith. Many of her poems are on the topics of God and the Holy Spirit.

In 2014, she was in a terrible car crash while driving from Lesotho to Bloemfontein. Khala's car was hit by a speeding car, which forced her car to roll over five times. She was unconscious, and was admitted to Netcare Private Hospital in Bloemfontein and transferred to Maseru Private Hospital the next day. She promised her fans that she would recuperate, saying, "I am Sheila Khala, a true believer, and my life is a testimony of what God is capable of doing. I love you and miss you all," adding, "I was saved by the Lord!"

== Bibliography ==
- Formula (2009)
- My Pen Is a Socialite (2012)
- Poetry Battle (2014)

== See also ==
- List of African poets
