= Alfred Themba Qabula =

South African worker-poet (1942–2002)

Alfred Themba Qabula (1942–2002) was a poet, writer and trade unionist in Durban, South Africa in the 1980s. He was a fork lift driver and a militant in the Metal and Allied Worker's Union. Qabula is best known as a "worker-poet" who managed the adaptation of traditional Zulu poetic forms to the gritty themes of daily life.

== Biography ==
=== Early years ===
Qabula was born in Flagstaff, Pondoland (part of today's South Africa in 1942. His father was a migrant mine worker who died when Alfred was very young.

He was a participant in the 1959 Pondoland Rebellion. Following its failure, he fled to the forest, where he joined the African National Congress.

Qabula moved to the gold-mining town of Carletonville and entered the construction trade, living a meager existence in the hostels and compounds of the area. He worked as a fork life operator and was active in the Metal and Allied Worker's Union.

In 1969 Qabula moved to Durban, where he initially lived in a shack in Amaouti in Inanda. He remained in that city until 1985.

From 1985 through 1988, Qabula was forced into hiding due to his outspoken support of the United Democratic Front, an organization which fought the continuation of the apartheid system in South Africa.

=== Poetry ===
Qabula was a key leader of the Durban Workers Cultural Local, a group which sparked broad cultural activity in the trade union movement by sponsoring plays, musical performance, and the literary arts. Qabula was himself at the heart of this movement as a revivalist of the Zulu isibongo poetic tradition.

Qabula took these traditional poetic forms and injected themes from daily life and the workplace, dealing with topics of survival and the fight for unionisation of the workplace.

=== Death and legacy ===
Qabula suffered a paralyzing stroke in 1998 and a second attack in 2002 before dying in October of that year.

At the time of his death, fellow South African poet Ari Sitas remarked:

"As Qabula has passed on for the 'lands of the high winds,' we must not forget that he died in poverty and that his last words on paper, one finished poem and four unfinished ones, were words marked with bitterness. He was deeply disappointed that 'his' revolution was taken over by a world of cell phones and briefcases. As he also discovered that his talents as an oral person were lost in the winds of change, these disturbing poems preceded his self-imposed exile.

"Truly, none of us was spared in these poems — 'The Long Road' is a criticism of all of us on our road to wealth and power, climbing over his back with spiked shoes. His 'Of Land, Bones and Money' is one of the most profound expressions of our negotiated settlement — reminding us of the 'restless dead.' And that 'seasons of drought have no rainbows.'"

== Works ==
- "Death," Flagstaff, Christmas 1985.
- Black Mamba Rising: izinkodolo zabasabenzi base South Africa emzabalatweni. 1986.
- A Working Life Cruel Beyond Belief. Culture and Working Life Project, University of Natal, 1989. —Memoir.
