= Anton Robert Krueger =

Anton Krueger
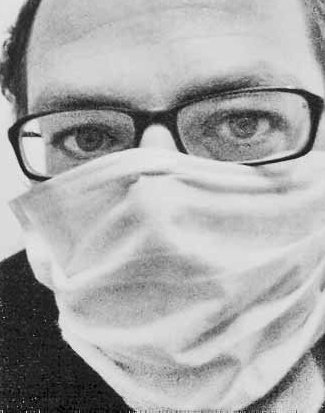
- Born: 1971 (age 54–55); South Africa
- Education: University of Pretoria
- Occupations: writer, academic
- Years active: 1996–present

Anton Robert Krueger (born 28 September 1971, in Phalaborwa, South Africa) is a South African playwright, poet and academic. His plays have been staged in South Africa, as well as in England, Wales, Australia, the USA, Monaco, Venezuela, Argentina and Chile. He has published under the pseudonyms of Martin de Porres, Robert Krueger, A.R. Krueger, Perd Booysen (in collaboration with Pravasan Pillay) and Sybrand Baard (in collaboration with Werner Pretorious).

== Sunnyside Sal ==
Sunnyside Sal (2010) is a jauntily narrated memoir set in the tumultuous early 1990s, when a whole generation in South Africa were discovering that everything they'd been taught to believe was wrong. Fuelled by his reckless bravado and post-punk philosophy, Sal plunges into extreme situations, but his innocent experiments in rebellion lead him increasingly into hazardous realms. Although ultimately a tragic tale, Sunnyside Sal is borne up throughout by an exuberant humour.

"Anton Krueger's [memoir] is a perceptive look into the world of two young boys whose changing hormones coincide with a country going through its own rebirth." Janet van Eeden.

"Light and Dark in mixture of memoir and novel" Review in Mail and Guardian by Jane Rosenthal.

== Experiments in Freedom ==
Winner of the 2011 Rhodes Vice-Chancellor's Book Award, Experiments in Freedom Cambridge Scholars Publishing examines ways in which identities have been represented in recent South African play texts published in English. It begins by exploring descriptions of identity from various philosophical, psychological and anthropological perspectives and elaborates ways in which drama is uniquely suited to represent – as well as to effect – transformations of identity. In exploring the fraught terrain of identity studies, the book examines a selection of published play texts in terms of five different discourses of identity – gender, nationalism, ethnicity, syncretism and race. Instead of building a sustained thesis throughout his text, Krueger writes in short bursts about a multiplicity of topics, extending his explorations rhizomatically into the crevices of a new South African society loath to relinquish its stranglehold on the politics of identity. (from the blurb).

Reviews

Anton Krueger examines recent South African play texts, arguing that theatre can function not only as a medium for representing identity but also as a space in which identities are formed. His analysis discusses how contemporary plays engage with questions of identity and cultural expression within South African theatre.

(Homann, Greg. 2010. "Stages of Identity". Mail & Guardian. Friday, July 2:19.)

“[W]ell written....maps an important field of research with intellectual rigour and exemplary fair-mindedness, and negotiates a complicated route through a plethora of contentious artistic manifestoes and critical opinions with sophistication and maturity.”

Prof. Robert Gordon, Goldsmiths College, University of London

“[Experiments in Freedom] shows Krueger's ability to bring an insightful critical perspective not only towards the play texts that he examines, but to theory itself...The style of writing is lucid and avoids obfuscation, the '(mis)management' of syntax and tortured logic, common to some authors writing in a post modernist vein. This in no way distracts from the complexity of the subject matter or the profound insights that the text offers.”

Prof. Fred Hagemann, Department of Drama, University of Pretoria

“[Experiments in Freedom] has been a pleasure to read...The writing exudes clarity and the arguments are cogently rehearsed...[It] guides the reader on a journey that is concomitantly innovative, challenging and informative...written eloquently and lucidly – it deserves a valuable place in its field [and] should be a compulsory text in South African and international libraries."

Prof. Marcia Blumberg, York University, Toronto

“The issues [Experiments in Freedom] addresses...could not be more relevant or topical...Krueger strikes a pleasing balance between the scholarly and the polemical...His tendentiousness is transparent, bold, even refreshing: it carries the force of his conviction and his experience as a South African and a dramatist in his own right...A further strength is that his style is clear and accessible throughout. He succeeds in being scholarly without resorting to jargon or the kind of stodgy academic writing which one encounters all too frequently.”

Prof. David Medalie, Department of English, University of Pretoria

== Shaggy ==
In collaboration with Pravasan Pillay, the Shaggy stories are ironic comedy monologues generally narrated by wingers, whiners, wimps and wankers. A number of stories appeared in A Look Away magazine during 2010, and six stories were performed at the National Arts Festival in the same year. A collection of 14 Shaggy stories is due for release in mid-2011.

Reviews

"A comedy and social commentary piece that runs like a pair of freshly laddered stockings… once you're in it, there's no going back!...The show is an all-round success in presentation and script. A funny and entertaining piece of theatre, that is well performed and constantly keeps the cogs of the mind turning and churning."

Artsmart, review by Shika Budhoo.

"An entertaining show consisting of six monologues which provide a satirical commentary of life in modern South Africa...a number of different characters [are] played with great dexterity by Zanne Solomon and Tristan Jacobs." Thomas Boughey, Cue

== Living in Strange Lands ==
Krueger's most critically acclaimed work to date is Living in Strange Lands (also known as Tsafendas) – a play about Hendrik Verwoerd's assassin Dimitri Tsafendas. The play was awarded a special trophy by the South African Community Theatre Association in 2001, and was nominated for South Africa's highest stage award, the FNB/Vita prize. Living in Strange Lands has been staged all over South Africa, as well as in Venezuela. In 2009 it was revived for the Proyecto festival of South African theatre in Buenos Aires, Argentina.

Reviews

A review (translated from the Spanish) by Nicolás Fernandez Bravo.

"The stunning performance of Renos Nicos Spanoudes in the role of Dimitri Tsafendas – the descendent of a Greek father and a Swazi mother who assassinated, by stabbing, Dr Henrik Verwoerd – could make Living in Strange Lands the best play of the Festival. The impeccable text that narrates the construction of a person "without a group", transcends the particular boundaries of the irrationality of the South African segregationism to pose questions about identity and home, in a universal geography. The mastery with which Spanoudes interprets the radical doubt about the madness transports us to the same nucleus of classification systems that still today guide the actions that are hidden by the control of the whole State. The investigative work of Anton Krueger (Imaginary Stage) is evident in the play and he has majestically achieved the combination of historic rigour with a magnificent Freudian theatrical realisation."

Tsafendas received positive reviews in a number of South African newspapers, with The Star stating: "This docu-drama doubles as a study in personal and political madness...ring[s] with social and personal truths...harrowing ritualistic imagery and a luminously intelligent text...a dramatic tour de force."

A sample of the text is available from Playscripts, Inc. of New York.

== Chatter ==
A comedy of mistaken identity, which won the Gauteng 2007 Performing Arts Network of South Africa Festival of Staged Readings. In 2008 it was performed at the National Arts Festival in Grahamstown, and the 969 Festival in Johannesburg.

Synopsis

Two brothers meet after many years apart. Albert has been living in London for eight years and is returning to South Africa to meet a girl he's fallen in love with over the internet. Adler, on the other hand, has been getting ahead in the not so New South Africa and his communications company is thriving. So Albie is looking for love while Adi is expecting to meet his new franchisee, but the identities of the two girls are mistaken for each other, leading to an increasingly embarrassing series of encounters helped along by awry sms's and seductive internet chat streams. In this way worlds of romance and commerce collide as issues of identity – be it ethnic, national, or sexual – become increasingly complicated by a series of misunderstandings. After the air has cleared and everybody thinks they've finally figured out who's who, a final twist reveals they may have preferred the confusion.

Reviews

"An excellent piece, a comedy of errors and a commentary on the modern human condition. Thoroughly enjoyable, particularly for those of us who have found that our lives are intricately linked with technology, especially internet chat room hook-ups." (Lee-Ann Knowles, Cue 28 Jun 2008)

"A delightful comedy of errors in which Alan Ayckbourn-style farce meets chatroom culture, this play provides a refreshing moment in the midst of the festival's intensity." (Theresa Edlmann, 29 Jun 2008) An interview with Anton Krueger on Litnet about Chatter.

== Axis ==
Axis is a black comedy ignited by the frisson between media, terrorism and fundamentalism. It has never been performed.

== Other Plays ==
1996 – The Velvet City (London: Plays & Musicals)

1997 / 2009 – In the Blue Beaker: A Comedy about Suicide (New York: Playscripts, Inc.) An interview with the cast of Blue Beaker.

1999 – Vanessa and the Vanguard London: Plays & Musicals.)

2000 – Mediocrity (London: Plays & Musicals)

2002 – The Importance of Being Thabo

2003 – Sasha's Secret Language

2004 – Dialectics # 1

Two short plays for adolescents “Caitlyn and Thandi” and “Behind the Bicycle Sheds” appear in What shall we do now and other one-act plays. Johannesburg: Macmillan South Africa. (2009).

== Other Writing ==
Anton Krueger's poems have appeared in a range of South African literary magazines and journals, including Itch, Botsotso, Green Dragon, New Coin, Laugh it Off, Litnet, Big Bridge, Incwadi, African Writing Online and Alookaway. In 2008 he participated in Poetry Africa, hosted by the Centre for Creative Arts in Durban, South Africa.

Krueger was the English poetry editor on Litnet for a number of years. During his time there, Michelle McGrane conducted this interview with him.

As part of the Pretoria-based poetry collective "Bekgeveg" Krueger appeared at venues in Pretoria, Johannesburg, Alberton and at major Afrikaans festivals including the Klein Karoo Nasionale Kunstefees and Aardklop, between 1998–2003. He appeared in a Bekgeveg revival show in 2013 at the Asbos Theatre in Pretoria.

Krueger has also experimented with a range of other genres, including short stories, lyrics, manifestos and physical theatre texts.

His first collection of poetry, Everyday Anomalies appeared in 2011 and was reviewed by Craig Mackenzie:

“Krueger revels in stripped-down, minimalist poetry in the imagist style…the poet knows how to evoke images and emotions by the way of tantalising fragments…irreverent, funny and caustic he delights in the incongruity of things…I was impressed with this debut collection. It is jaunty, funny and fast-paced, and yet has enough incisiveness and gravitas to draw the reader in.” Literator 32(3) December 2011.

== Music ==
Anton Krueger plays the classical guitar and has written music for plays, including his own apocalyptic science fiction comedy The Velvet City, and Wole Soyinka's play The Invention. His fat electric sound appears in Maritz van den Berg's alternative Afrikaans poetry band "Die Plesier Parade".

== Photography ==
Anton Krueger has exhibited work at Kyk Gallery in Pretoria. Some of his works appear at Vagabondage and on the kagablog.

== Short Films ==
1999 – Unenlightenment...screened at online film fest FilmGarten.com in Hamburg

2002 – Eugene's Dream of the Absa Building...screened as part of South African edition of Unlikely Stories.

2004 – Mind Your Head. A comedy sketch show pilot made for television by Neurotic Ninja Studios. (unreleased)

2007 – Krueger makes a cameo appearance in Bakgat as Dominee Paulus.

2008 – Anzan and the Visitors – An odd, slightly surreal, slightly perverse film written and directed by Krueger, about two inept burglars who befriend their victim. It was shown at the national Arts Festival and at Coal Stove in Johannesburg.

2009 – Krueger features in Johan Botha's debut film That Film

2009 – Tuesday – Written and Directed by Anton Krueger, and made with students from the Rhodes Department of Drama, this surreal short (27 min) film has been screened at the National Arts Festival, the Durban International Film Festival (in 2010) as well as at a festival of South African Cinema in Buenos Aires.

== Academic Research ==
Anton Krueger has presented papers at conferences on philosophy, literature and theatre in South Africa, as well as in Australia, Russia, the Netherlands, Finland, China, Argentina, Germany and Portugal. He has published articles in the South African Theatre Journal, English in Africa, Scrutiny2, Current Writing and has reviewed books and drama for The Sunday Independent, the Mail and Guardian, Wordstock and Cue.

Anton Krueger has a DLitt from the Department of English, University of Pretoria. He is an associate professor in the Department of Drama, Rhodes University.
