= Keith Gottschalk =

South African poet

- Born: 14 March 1946 (age 80); Cape Town, Union of South Africa

Keith Gottschalk OIS, is a South African poet, known for his anti-apartheid poetry. He was born on the 14 March 1946 in Cape Town, where he still lives. He studied at the University of Cape Town 1964–70, where he was a tutor and junior lecturer to 1983.

Keith Gottschalk's poetry is political, and its appearance at cultural festival and mass rallies of the mass democratic movement attests to its massive success as political poetry. He is a performing poet, whose work needs to be heard as well as read.

He has given over one hundred performances of his poems, and also had over one hundred poems published in magazines such as New Coin, New Contrast, Phoebe, Staffrider and Agenda. His first collection was Emergency Poems.

In his introduction to Emergency Poems Peter Horn described Gottschalk's contribution as follows: "wit and conceit also seem to me to describe most adequately the poetic and aesthetic vehicles which Gottschalk chooses to address the political in poetry. Often, when critics address poetry like Gottschalk's they use the term satire, this most misplaced and displaced genre in English poetry. What is central to satire and to wit is not, as popular misconception may have it, its comic quality, the funniness, but the sudden flashlike insight into the incongruous, as Freud has clearly shown in his study on the Witz. He was praised for his poems' "tight control and their strategy of irony." His modernisation of the traditional African praise poem "shows their continued existence and meaning for large portions of the population."

In 2021 he published Cosmonauts do it in Heaven, a collection of poems on spaceflight and astronomy

== Academic career ==
He moved to the University of the Western Cape in 1984 and served as head of department in 2004-2006.

He is a Fulbright scholar.

He served as the chair of the Cape Centre of the Astronomical Society of Southern Africa from 2005 to 2006. He is also a member of the British Interplanetary Society and the South African Space Association.

In retirement he was promoted to adjunct professor in 2023.

== Awards and honors ==
In April 2023, Gottschalk was bestowed the National Order of Ikhamanga (Silver) by the South African Government for "using your creativity to draw critical attention to oppressive and unjust laws through performative political poetry. Your work promoted strength and motivated many people to fight for liberation"

== See also ==
- Literature of South Africa

== Sources ==
- Adey, David; Ridley Beeton; Michael Chapman; Ernest Pereira (1986). Companion to South African English Literature. Johannesburg: A.D.Donker.
- Alvarez-Pereyre, Jacques (1983). The Poetry of Commitment in South Africa.
- Chapman, Michael (1984). South African English Poetry. A Modern Perspective. A.D.Donker.
- Horn, Peter (1994). Writing my Reading. Essays on Literary Politics in South Africa. Amsterdam/Atlanta: Rodopi Press.
- GOTTSCHALK, Keith (1984). Inside. Jeremy Cronin (Ravan, Johannesburg 1983). Critical Arts: A Journal for Media Studies, 3.2 : 54.: A.D.Donker.
