= Sarah Johnson (poet) =

South African poet (born 1980)

Sarah Johnson (born 1980) is a South African poet.

Sarah Johnson was born in Cape Town. She completed her MA in creative writing at the University of Cape Town, and published her first work, a collection of poetry, in 2004. Personae was described by Stephen Watson as 'one of the best debut volumes in recent years'.

After a hiatus of nearly a decade, she began writing again in 2018.

== Personal life ==
As of 2018, she lives in Cape Town with her husband and two children.

== Poetry ==
- Personae. (University of Cape Town, 2004) review
