= Felix Mnthali =

Malawian poet, novelist, and playwright

Felix Mnthali (born 1933 in Southern Rhodesia) is a Malawian poet, novelist and playwright. Educated at what is now the National University of Lesotho, Mnthali's works include a book of poetry, When Sunset Comes to Sapitwa (1980), and a novel, My Dear Anniversary (1992). He was also included in the 1984 Penguin Book of Modern African Poetry. His poem "The Stranglehold of English Lit." implicates the English literary tradition, and especially Jane Austen, in the slave trade and colonial imperialism.

Mnthali was a professor at the University of Botswana for 28 years, until he retired in 2010.
