= Ali Azayku =

- Ɛli Azayku
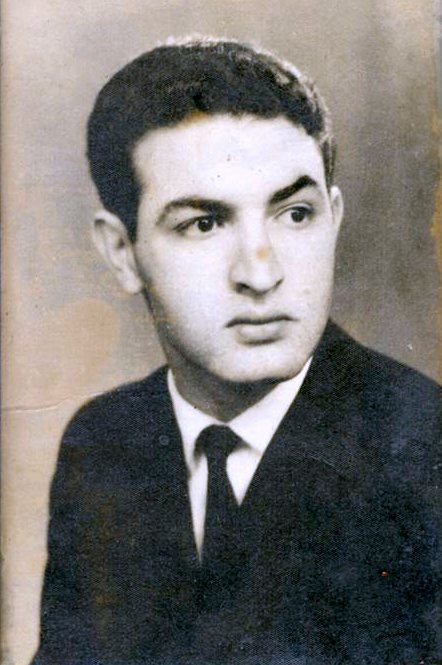
- Azayku in 1962
- Born: 1942
- Died: 2004 (aged 61–62)
- Occupations: poet, historian, philosopher

Ali Sidqi Azaykou (Tachelhit: Ɛli Azayku; 1942–2004), also called Dda Ali, was a Moroccan Berber poet, historian, philosopher and critic. He was an Amazigh activist. He has greatly influenced the cultural Berber movements.

== Biography ==
Ali Sidqi Azaykou was born (1942) in the village of Igran n tuinght in the High Atlas in the surroundings of Taroudannt in the Sous region in Morocco. He began his primary education in his native village and ended them in Marrakesh where he also followed his secondary education and entered the national teacher training college.

In 1979, he co-founded the Amazigh association alongside Mohamed Chafik and Abdelhamid Zemmouri. In 1981, the journal *Amazigh* published an article by Ali Sidki Azaykou—which had originally appeared in the magazine *Tiydrin* in 1972 in which he defends the importance of the Amazigh element in Morocco's history. Becoming the first intellectual to challenge official Moroccan historiography, he was arrested and convicted in 1982 for "endangering state security." serving a year in Rabat's penitentiary. Upon his release, he resumed his academic research and, in 1988, obtained a *Diplôme d’études approfondies* (DEA)—an advanced postgraduate degree—in history with highest honors.

== Books ==
- Timitar. Collection of Berber poetry. 1988.
- Relation de voyage du Marabout de Tasaft dans le Haut-Atlas. Éd. de la Faculté des Lettres, Kénitra, 1992.
- Izmulen. Collection of Berber poetry. Rabat, 1995.
- Histoire du Maroc et ses possibles interprétations. Recueil d'articles. Éd. Centre Tarik Ibn Zyad, Rabat, 2002. Introduction by Ahmed Toufiq.
- L'islam et les Amazighs, 2002.
- Quelques exemples de toponymes marocains, 2004.
- Petit dictionnaire arabe/amazigh, Éd. Annajah Al Jadida, 1993, Casablanca.
