= Mohamud Siad Togane =

Somali-Canadian poet and peace activist

- محمد سياد توغن
- Born: Maxamed Siyaad Toogane; July 1, 1947 (age 79); Somalia
- Citizenship: Canadian
- Education: Eastern Mennonite College
- Occupations: poet, scholar, writer
- Website: togane.org

Mohamud Siad Togane (Somali: Maxamed Siyaad Toogane, Arabic: محمد سياد توغن; born July 1, 1947) is a Somali-Canadian poet and peace activist.

== Biography ==
Born in Somalia, Togane was educated in Mennonite schools in Mahaddei and Jowhar in his home country. He subsequently moved to the United States, where he attended Hartnell Junior College. He graduated from Eastern Mennonite College with a BA in English literature in 1969, He returned to Somalia and taught at the Lafole College of Education from 1970 to 1973. Like many other intellectuals, he left Somalia to escape Mohammed Siad Barre's military regime. He settled in Canada in 1973 and acquired Canadian citizenship in 1978. He received an MA in creative writing from Montreal's Concordia University in 1982. He has taught and lectured at many colleges and universities in Canada and the United States. He co-founded the Montreal Somali House and the Somali Peace coalition, and has been involved in several efforts for Somali peace and reconciliation, including a visit to Somalia in 1991–92.

Togane published his first collection of poetry in 1986. The book, The Bottle and the Bushman: Poems of the Prodigal Son, focussed on themes of racism and alcoholism. This and future writings also acerbically critique Somali social and political practices, including female genital mutilation, life under dictatorship, prejudice between cultures, clans and religions and the dangers of clans. His works, described as "brilliant caustic, controversial, wickedly funny, and associative free-verse commentaries", also appear on his and other Somali websites, skewering aspects of Somali politics and experience. The poems, which often examine and reflect on subjects that are taboo in public Somali discourse, sometimes use vulgar language to reinforce the point. Religious, philosophical, literary and pop culture references abound. Critics argue his confrontational style sometimes contributes to the conflict he seeks to expose and oppose. However, others state that his style reflects his acknowledgement that he, like other Somalis, is deeply influenced by clan-based thinking and the influence of the civil war.

His poetry has been collected in several anthologies and appeared on Montreal buses as part of the Poetry in Motion program. Togane has written articles for various media, including The Globe and Mail, Zymergy, and African Art.

== Bibliography ==
- The Bottle and the Bushman: Poems of the Prodigal Son, Ste-Anne de Bellevue, Québec : The Muses' Co., 1986. ISBN 0-919754-07-4
- Bridges: Literature Across Cultures (1994)
- Quebec Suite: Poems for and about Quebec (1995)
- Eternal Conversations (2003)
- Fifty Years, Fifty Stories (2003)
