= Mohammed Khammar Kanouni =

Moroccan poet

Mohammed Khammar Kanouni or Guenouni (1938 in Ksar el-Kebir-1991) was one of the three most important poets of Morocco in the 1960s.

== Bibliography ==
- Ramâd Hisbirîs. Casablanca: Toubkal, 1987. (Las cenizas de las Hespérides) Poems
- Al-shâ`ir lam yamut, Tanger: Wikâla Shirâ` li-H:idmât, 1998. (The poet does not die) Poetry
