= Ahmed Joumari =

Moroccan writer and poet

Ahmed Joumari (1939 Casablanca – 1995) was a Moroccan writer and poet. He was one of the pioneers of modern Arabic poetry in Morocco.

== Bibliography ==
- Ahmed al-Joumari, Ashar fi al hubb wa al mawt, 1978
