= Maria do Carmo Abecassis =

Mozambican poet

Maria do Carmo Abecassis is a Mozambican poet.

Abecassis was born in Lourenço Marques, Mozambique. She is known for her collection of poems in Portuguese Em vez de asas tenho braços ("Instead of wings I have arms"), published in 1973. She was known to be employed by the Expresso newspaper of Lisbon in 1981.

== Publications ==
- Maria do Carmo Abecassis (5 December 1968). "Duas horas na vida de uma mulher". Diário Popular.
- Abecassis, Maria do Carmo (1973). Em vez de asas tenho braços. Lisbon: Edições Ática. p. 226.
