= Kim McClenaghan =

South African poet and writer

Kim McClenaghan (born 1974), is a South African poet and writer.

He was born in the Transkei, and moved to Cape Town at the age of 14. He now lives in London. He completed his MA in creative writing at the University of Cape Town, and published his first work, a collection of poetry, in 2002 and his first novel in 2005. His works have been described by Stephen Watson as 'landscapes of the heart'.

== Poetry ==
- Revisitings (2002)

== Novels ==
- Hoarding of the Heart (2005)
