= Angifi Dladla =

South African poet, playwright, writing teacher (1950–2020)

Angifi Proctor Dladla (24 November 1950 – 17 October 2020) was a South African poet, playwright, writing teacher and coach. He was born in Thaka township in Gauteng.

While in Geneva, as playwright-in-residence, he wrote Kgodumodumo, a play about traditional knowledge, and the protection of biodiversity. In 1997, he founded the Bachaki Theatre, and in 1998, the Community Life Network, a cultural organisation with a focus on community building. While teaching in the East Rand, he changed his name to Muntu Wa Bachaki to avoid persecution by the apartheid government.

His poetry first came strongly to prominence during the 1990s, with many of his poems appearing in New Coin poetry magazine under the editorship of Robert Berold. His development was partially contemporaneous to other poets such as Mxolisi Nyezwa, Seithlamo Motsapi, Lesego Rampolokeng, a generation of writers labelled by academic Tom Penfold as "the poets of no sure place", their writing expressing the experience of the South African transition in a manner that challenged the status quo and expressed "the sense of imbalance and infinite disquiet" (Penfold, 2015) that they witnessed in contemporary society.

He published three volumes of poetry.

== Poetry ==
- The Girl Who Then Feared To Sleep (2001)
- We are All Rivers (2010)
- Maxwell the Gorilla and the Archbishop of Soshanguve (2015)

== Sources ==
- Penfold, T., 2015. "Mxolisi Nyezwa's poetry of no sure place". Social Dynamics: A Journal of African Studies, 42(3), pp 504–529
