= Mohammed ibn Qasim ibn Zakur =

Abu Abdallah Mohammed ibn Qasim ibn Zakur (Arabic: ابن زاكور; died 1708) was a Moroccan poet, historian and travel writer from Fes. He was a pupil of the school of Abu Ali al-Hassan al-Yusi. He wrote poetry, history, biographies, travel accounts, and books on grammar, rhetoric, law and theology. One of his travel accounts is about a journey he made to Algeria in 1682. His poems were published in a diwan.
