= Ahmed Lemsyeh =

Moroccan poet (born 1950)

Ahmed Lemsyeh (born in 1950 in Sidi Smail) is a Moroccan poet. He writes his poems mainly in Moroccan Darija. Lemsyeh writes for the journal Al-Ittih'ad al-Ishtiraki and teaches at a high school in Rabat.

He has 25 published works, including 18 collections of poetry, which include:

- Riyyah... Allati Sata-'ti رياح... التي ستأتي (Winds... that will come) (1976) in Moroccan Darija
- Fayadan Aththalj فيضان الثلج (Snow Flood) (1986) in Arabic
- Skun Trez Lma شكون اطرز لما (Who embroidered the water) (1994) in Moroccan Darija
