= Al-Buzidi al-Bujrafi =

Al-Yazid al-Buzidi Bujrafi (1925 - 29 December 2011) was a prominent Berber Sufi poet and shaykh of the Alawi-Darqawi order, a branch of the Shadhili order. He lived at his Zawiya in Zaghanghan, Nador.

== Biography ==
He was born as al-Yazid Bujrafi in Bani Shikar, in the Rif region of North-East Morocco, in 1925. He memorised the Quran under the tutelage of his father, who in 1934 took the 19-year-old al-Yazid to Sidi Muhammadi Bil-Hajj, Sheikh of the Alawi order, to take the litanies of the order from him.

Sheikh Muhammadi instructed al-Yazid to continue his spiritual instruction under Sheikh Moulay Suleiman ibn al-Mahdi, also of Bani Shikar, whom al-Yazid maintained a close relationship with until his death in 1970, marrying his daughter and serving as Imam in his Zawiya. It was Moulay Suleiman who changed al-Yazid's name to al-Buzidi, in reference to two great masters of the Darqawi brotherhood, Muhammad al-Buzidi al-Ghimari, disciple of Moulay al-Arabi al-Darqawi; and Muhammad ibn al-Habib Hamu al-Buzidi, Sheikh of Ahmad al-Alawi, founder of the Alawi order.

Following Moulay Suleiman's death in 1970, Sheikh al-Buzidi assumed leadership of the brotherhood in Morocco, and shortly afterwards established a new Zawiya in Zaghanghan, Nador, which remains the head Zawiya of the brotherhood in Morocco to his day.

== See also ==
- Ahmad al-Alawi
- Darqawa
- Shadhili
