= Zahra Mansouri =

Moroccan poet

Zahra Mansouri (Arabic: الزهرة المنصوري) is a Moroccan poet. Her poems were published in "The Poetry of Arab Women: A Contemporary Anthology", United States, ed. Interlink Books, 2001, (ISBN 1-56656-374-7).

== Poems ==
- The Secrecy of Mirrors
- Abandonment
