= Charl Cilliers (writer) =

South African author and poet

Charl Jean Francois Cilliers (also credited as Charles Cilliers) (25 January 1941 to 16 July 2019) was a South African author and poet. His published works include "West-falling Light" (1971), "Has Winter No Wisdom" (1979).

== Early years and education ==
Cilliers was born in Cape Town, and grew up in Free State. His primary school years were spent in a succession of different schools as the family moved around. He went to Clapham High School in Pretoria, where he matriculated in 1957.

Cilliers lectured in telecommunications in the Post Office Training Centre in Pretoria until 1968 when he joined Parliament as a translator. He retired as Chief Editor of the Hansard Reporting Unit until in 1999.

His published volumes are:

West-Falling Light, Tafelberg Publishers, 1971; Has Winter No Wisdom, Maskew Miller, 1979; Collected Poems (1960–2008), Malgas Publishers, 2008; Fireflies Facing The Moon (Children's Poems), Malgas Publishers, 2008; The Journey, Malgas Publishers, 2010; A Momentary Stay, Malgas Publishers, 2011; Karoo (Haiku Variations), 2012.

== Writing ==
Charl J. F. Cilliers writing poetry at the age of 14. His first volume "West-falling Light" was published in 1971, followed by "Has Winter No Wisdom" in 1979. He has published in magazines such as Standpunte, Contrast, Ophir, Poet (India), Purple Renoster, New Nation (of which he was also poetry editor), De Arte, Chirimo (Rhodesia) and Unisa English Studies.

His work also appeared in anthologies such as "Two Roads" (compiled by Ken Durham in 1969), "Seismograph" (compiled by Jack Cope in 1970), "For All Seasons" (compiled by F. C. H. Rumboll and J. B. Gardener in 1973), "Out Of The African Ark" (edited by David and Guy Butler in 1988), "25/25" (edited by David Bunyan in 1989) and "Somewhere I Have Never Travelled" (edited by Terrill Nicolay in 1996).

His poems have also been broadcast by the SABC.

== Published poetry ==
- West-Falling Light (1971)
- Has Winter No Wisdom (1979)
- Collected Poems (2008)
- Fireflies Facing The Moon (Children’s Poems, 2008)
- Work In Progress
- The Journey
- World In A Grain Of Sand
