= Shadya Yasin =

Shadya Yasin شادية ياسين
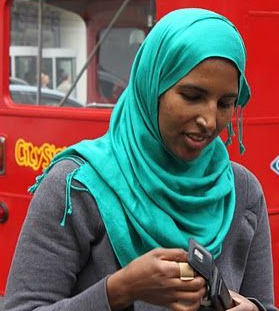
- Born: 1983 or 1984 (age 42–43); Somalia
- Education: York University
- Occupations: activist, poet, teacher
- Title: Coordinator for the York Youth Coalition

Shadya Yasin (Somali: Shaadiyya Yaasiin; Arabic: شادية ياسين) is a Somali social activist, poet and teacher.

== Personal life ==
Yasin was born around 1984 in Somalia. Later living for a period in Tanzania and Kenya, she emigrated to Canada in 1998 while in her teens.

For her post-secondary education, Yasin studied at York University in Toronto. She held a double major in International Development and African Studies, graduating with a Bachelor of Arts in 2007. She is presently working toward a master's degree in education at the University of Toronto's Ontario Institute for Studies in Education.

== Career ==
Professionally, Shadya is a certified teacher.

Since 2008, she has served as the network coordinator for the York Youth Coalition, a Toronto-based NGO. In this capacity, Yasin manages 18 youth service agencies in the Weston-Mt. Dennis area. She is also on the Ontario Premier's Council on Youth Opportunities.

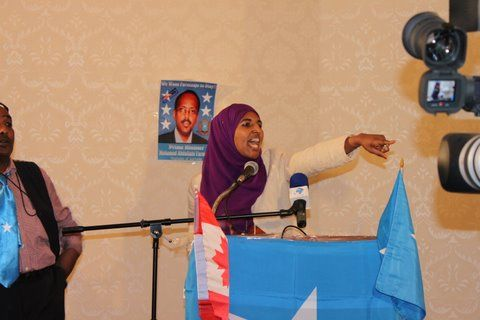
Shadya Yasin energizes the crowd at a pro-Farmajo rally in Toronto (June 2011).

In 2011, Yasin along with other Somali-Canadians led demonstrations in support of Somali Prime Minister Mohamed Abdullahi Mohamed (Farmajo), who had been forced to resign in June over the Kampala Accord. She concurrently helped organize a youth walk to Ottawa to raise awareness of that year's severe drought in Somalia.

Additionally, Yasin has connected Toronto youth with First Nations communities at Moose Deer Point, located close to Sudbury. Within the framework of the Creating Global Citizens initiative, she has traveled with at-risk urban youngsters to Tanzania in order to inculcate youth volunteerism. In December 2012, Yasin also helped plan the yearly West Won Festival showcase in Weston-Mount.

Besides teaching and activism, Yasin is a published poet and spoken word artist, having performed in a number of venues. As part of her course requirements in York University's CAP program, she played a young Hawa Jibril in Bridge of One Hair, an original musical production inspired by the veteran Somali poet Jibril's verse and life. Yasin has also worked with many arts projects aimed at children and adolescents under the auspices of the AGO.

== Awards ==
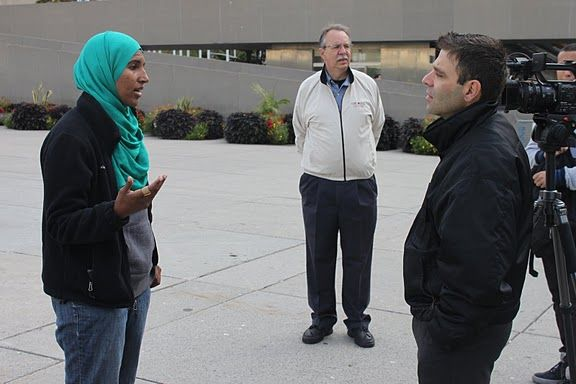
Yasin speaking to the media at Nathan Phillips Square in Toronto (2011).

For 2013, the Toronto Star named Yasin among its annual People to Watch in recognition of her extensive social work.
