= Mohammed ibn Idris al-Amrawi =

Morroccan poet and courtier

Mohammed ibn Idris al-Amrawi (Arabic: محمد بن إدريس العمراوي; 1794–1847), or, in full, Abu Abdallah Mohammed ibn Idris ibn Mohammed ibn Idris ibn Mohammed ibn Idris (three times) ibn al-Hajj Mohammed al-Azammuri al-Amrawi al-Fasi was a poet from Fes and the vizier of the sultan Abderrahmane. He was one of the most prominent literary figures of Morocco in the 19th century.
