= Allal El Hajjam =

Moroccan Arabic language professor and poet

Allal El Hajjam (born 22 December 1949) is a poet and professor of Arabic language in the School of Humanities and Social Sciences at Al Akhawayn University in Ifrane, Morocco. Previously he taught at the School of Arts and Humanities in Meknès. He also taught at the Centers for Teacher Training at Errachidia, Rabat, and Meknès.
