= Rose Moss =

American writer (born 1937)

Rose Rappoport Moss (born 1937) is an American writer born in South Africa. She emigrated to America in 1961. She has published novels, short stories, words for music and nonfiction. In addition, she was a teacher at Wellesley College. Along with Barney Simon and Rose Zwi, she was one of the so-called Johannesburg group of writers. Her work has been analysed for its powerful use of language.
