= Sulayman al-Hawwat =

Abu al-Rabi Sulayman ibn 'Abd Allah al-Hawwat Shafshawani (Arabic: سليمان الحوات الشفشاوني; 1747–1816) was a Moroccan historian, biographer and poet.

== Bibliography ==
Works by Sulayman al-Hawwat:

- Thamarat ansi fi al-ratif bi-nafsi, Morocco : Markaz al-Dirasat wa-al-Buhuth al-Andalusiyah, 1996. (This book-length, first person account covers the author's life and family, including his father's four brothers.)
- On the Banu Suda al-Murri family from Fez: Al Rawda al maqsuda wa-l-halal al-mamduda fi ma'athir Bani Suda (2vols.), Casablanca, 1994
- An exhaustive treatise on the Dila'yun family: Al-Budiir al-Dawiyya a fi ta'rif bi-'l-Sadat ahl al-Zawiya al-Dila'iya
- Al-Sirr al-Zahir fi man ahraza bi Faz al-sharaf al-bahir min akab al-shaykh Abd al-Kadir, Fez, s.a.
