= Chapanga Wilson =

Tanzanian poet

Chapanga Mulenga
- Born: 8 February 1978; Mbeya
- Died: 18 June 2014 (aged 36); Houston, Texas
- Education: University of Houston
- Occupations: Poet, writer
- Writing career
- Language: English

Chapanga Mulenga "Peter" Wilson III (February 8, 1978 – June 18, 2014) was a Tanzanian poet whose book Words by My Mood is an anthology of poetry detailing his life experiences.

Born in Mbeya, he lived in Lesotho, Malawi, Tanzania and the United States. He attended the University of Houston, where he majored in Information Technology and minored in African studies.

He died on June 18, 2014, in Houston, Texas.

== Publications ==
- Words by My Mood: Book of Poetry, 2005
