= Crystal Warren =

South African poet

- Born: 1969 (age 56–57); South Africa
- Occupations: Poet, writer
- Writing career
- Language: English

Crystal Warren is a South African poet.

== Biography ==
Crystal Warren was born and raised in Port Elizabeth, Eastern Cape, South Africa. She has lived in Grahamstown for more than twenty years. She works at the National English Literary Museum and teaches a creative writing class at Rhodes University. Her poems have been widely published in South African literary journals and her first collection was Bodies of Glass and her most recent is Predictive Text, published by Modjaji Press in 2019. She was formerly the editor of New Coin poetry magazine.
