= Isabella Motadinyane =

South African poet, performance poet and actor

Isabella Motadinyane (1963 – 2003) was a South African poet, performance poet and actor.

She was born in Soweto and was a founding member of the Botsotso Jesters poetry group, and was on the editorial board of Botsotso Publishing, both named after a line from one of her poems "die is mos bosotsos". She wrote and performed in a number of languages, including English, Sotho, Camtho and Afrikaans.

== Works ==
- We Jive Like This, Botsotso Publishing, 1996
- Dirty Washing, Botsotso Publishing, 1999
- Bella (Collected Works), 2007
