= Wopko Jensma =

South African poet and artist

- Born: Wopko Pieter Jensma; 26 July 1939; Ventersdorp, South Africa
- Disappeared: August, 1993 (age 52); Johannesburg
- Status: Missing for 33 years and 1 or 2 months
- Occupations: Poet, artist

Wopko Pieter Jensma (born 26 July 1939 in Ventersdorp, South Africa) is a South African poet and artist. During the 1960s and 1970s, Jensma published three collections of poetry; in addition, he created graphics and reproductions of woodcuts. He disappeared from Johannesburg without a trace in 1993, and has not been seen since.

== Early years ==
Wopko Pieter Jensma, born in Ventersdorp on 26 July 1939, was the eldest of three children of Dutch immigrant Pieter Duurt Jensma, who came to South Africa in 1928, and Anna S.C. Coetzee. He has a sister, Elsa and a brother called Andries. Jensma spent most of his childhood in Middelburg, Eastern Cape, where his father worked at the Grootfontein College of Agriculture. At school he participated in rugby, among other things. He scored the winning goal in a rugby match against the neighboring town of Hofmeyr, this event was published in the town newspaper 'Die Midlander', a report which Jensma later used on the cover of his poetry collection "I Must Show you my Clippings". His mother died in 1948, after which his father married Francina Coetzee, a young woman from the area.

== Background ==
Jensma's art is ethnic, based on a theme unique to himself, lino-printed images of animals drawn as characteristics of people. His poetry was characterized as having a jazzlike feel to it; he described his words as his jazz instrument and his expression being his rhythm.

A selection of Jensma's poems appeared, with a brief biography, in the anthology Ten South African Poets edited and introduced by Adam Schwartzman (Manchester: Carcanet Press, 1999). There is an online appreciation of Jensma's poetry and art works, with quotations and some biographical details, by Tony McGregor entitled I write you from afar: Wopko Jensma, enigmatic poet of Africa.

== Disappearance ==
In 1993, he was taken to the Johannesburg General hospital for his weekly treatment. When the Salvation Army driver came to fetch him, he was nowhere to be found. People who knew Jensma were contacted in all the major centres, the Salvation Army checked all its shelters and attempts were made to determine whether he had entered a mental home in Pretoria. All efforts failed to produce any trace of him. His pension was last drawn in August 1993. No information of what became of him is known.

== Bibliography ==
- Sing for our Execution, Johannesburg: Ravan Press, 1973, OCLC 716422.
- Where White is the Colour/Where Black is the Number, Johannesburg: Ravan Press, 1974, OCLC 1638131.
- I Must Show you my Clippings, Johannesburg: Ravan Press, 1977, OCLC 3535712.

== See also ==
- List of people who disappeared mysteriously (1990s)
