= Vonani Bila =

South African author and poet

Vonani Bila is a South African author and poet.

== Life ==
He was born in 1972 in Shirley Village near Elim Hospital. Vonani Bila started his education at Shirley Primary School at his home village of Shirley, he proceeded to do his secondary education at Lemana High School at Njhakanjhaka Village near Elim Hospital. After Lemana high school, he attended the University of Natal. He holds an MA in Creative Writing from Rhodes University.

He is the founder and editor of the poetry journal Timbila and directs the Timbila Poetry Project in Shirley Village, Elim in Limpopo Province. He works as the co-ordinator of the Limpopo NGO Coalition and edits the newspaper Community Gazette.

He has written eight story books in English and Tsonga for newly literate adult readers. His poetry has been published in the collection No Free Sleeping. In 2003, Vonani Bila released his first music and poetry CD, Dahl Street, Pietersburg. Bila participated in the 'Poetry Africa 2005', an International festival of poetry held in Durban, South Africa.
