= Obo Aba Hisanjani =

Nigerian poet (born 1949)

Obo Aba Hisanjani (born 24 November 1949) is a Nigerian poet.

== Early life ==
Hisanjani was born in the small village of Ajah, now a bustling marketplace.

== Career ==
Hisanjani has campaigned against the development and exploitation of the surrounding areas for purely commercial purposes. In a television interview in 2001 he spoke about the loss of traditional land rights and values.

Known in Lagos as the Bushman Poet, Hisanjani is known for his native rhythms and complex Yoruba rhymes. His main themes cover traditional practices. He was criticised by many politicians in the 1980s for being against modernisation.

He is currently the Nigerian Poet Laureate.

== List of works ==
- Èdè Yorùbá (1965)
- ÁLÍFÁBËÊTÌ YORÙBÁ (1966)
- Egbe Isokan Egbe Omo (1971)
- Oyibos are a comin (1982) (translated as 'Whitemen are coming')
- Ade Oyibos (1991) (trans. The Royal Banana Man / White Man)
