= Mike Alfred =

South African poet, journalist, and historian

Mike Alfred is a South African poet, journalist, and historian who lives in Muizenberg, Cape Town. His poems have been widely published in anthologies and literary journals. He has produced six collections of poetry and three books and many articles and papers about the city and people of Johannesburg.

== Works ==
- "Several business books - People Really Matter; Bargain don't fight; Doing business in East Africa.
- Life in the Suburbs Poems.(Snail Press 1994)
- The Shadow Self Poems.( Self 1997)
- Johannesburg Portraits Biographical Essays (Jacana 2003)
- Poetic Licence Poems. (Botsotso 2007)
- "The Johannesburg Explorer Book" Johannesburg History and Guidebook [Parkview Press 2013]
- " Twelve plus One" Transcribed interviews with thirteen Johannesburg poets.[ Botsotso,2014]
- "Exeunt" - A short book of Mourning poems."[Issuu digital publishing platform 2015]
- Biographical and history writings can be found online in The Heritage Portal and Johannesburg Heritage Journal.
- A copy of 'Glimpses,' [completed in 2006], an unpublished series of 16 interviews with Johannesburg citizens from all walks of life, has been given to Johannesburg Heritage Trust's archive.
- "Travels in Geriatrica," Poetry about ageing, self-published by the author, printed by Minuteman Press, Bedford View, in July 2017
