= Ngudia Wendel =

Angolan Portuguese-language poet (born 1940)

- Born: 1940 (age 85–86); Ícolo e Bengo, near Luanda, Angola
- Education: medical studies
- Alma mater: in Soviet Union
- Occupations: MPLA guerilla leader, medical doctor, poet
- Writing career
- Subjects: Angolan struggle for independence, politics
- Notable works: Nós voltaremos, Luanda! (transl. We shall return, Luanda!), A república de iguais (A republic of equals), Triunfo de humilhados (Triumph of the humiliated)

Ngudia Wendel (born in 1940) is an Angolan military commander, poet and physician. In the service of MPLA (People's Movement for the Liberation of Angola) he first was a guerilla commander and later, after studying medicine in the Soviet Union, a physician. He was director of medical services in Cabinda Province and on the northern front during 1973-4.

== Publications ==
Wendel's publications include:

=== Poetry ===
- Wendel, Ngudia (1973). Noi ritorneremo, Luanda [We shall return, Luanda!] (in Italian). Translated by Segatori, Bruna Bozzetti. Forlì, Italy: Tipografia moderna. OCLC 77984572. 77 pages. Translated poetry.
- Wendel, Ngudia (1976). Nós voltaremos, Luanda! [We shall return, Luanda!] (in Portuguese). Luanda, Angola. OCLC 56428961. 37 pages. Poetry.

==== in anthologies ====
- Mea, Giuseppe, ed. (1975). Poesia angolana de revolta : antologia [Angolan revolutionary poetry : anthology]. Colecção Arte póetica, 4 (in Portuguese). Porto: Paisagem. OCLC 463028094. 193 pages.
- Wolfers, Michael, ed. (1979). Poems from Angola. African writers series, 215. Translated by Wolfers, Michael. London, Exeter, N.H., U.S.A.: Heinemann, Heinemann Educational Books. ISBN 9780435902155. OCLC 6343857. 112 pages. Translated poetry.
- Beier, Ulli; Moore, Gerald (2007). The Penguin book of modern African poetry. Penguin classics (4th ed.). London: Penguin Books. pp. 38–39. ISBN 9780140424720. OCLC 466152546. 448 pages. First edition 1963.

=== Prose ===
- Wendel, Ngudia (1976). Ngombe filho de Kambole e de Niangombe. Diario de Viagem na Zona Libertada pelo M P L A [Ngombe son of Kambole and Niangombe. Travelogue in the Zone Liberated by the M P L A] (PDF) (in Portuguese). Luanda: [s.n.] 71 pages, including a photo portrait of the author.

== Quote ==
The first lines of Wendel's poem We Shall Return, Luanda are:

Luanda, your are like a white seagull

on the ocean crest -
bright streets under the white sun,
flight of green palm trees...
but we have seen you grow black, Luanda,
since the bitter fourth of February

...

— Ngudia Wendel, We Shall Return, Luanda, Beier & Moore 2007, pp. 38-39.
