= Ingrid Andersen =

South African poet

- Born: 1965 (age 60–61); South Africa
- Occupations: Poet, editor, human rights advocate
- Years active: 1980s–present
- Employer: University of KwaZulu-Natal
- Known for: Excision (2004)
- Notable work: Excision; Piecework

Ingrid Andersen (born 1965) is a South African poet.

== Biography ==
Andersen lived in Johannesburg most of her life, worked in Grahamstown in the Eastern Cape for five years and relocated to the KwaZulu-Natal Midlands in 2007.

She worked as a theatre publicist in the 1980s, the days of political protest theatre, at the Market Theatre and PACT, amongst others. As South Africa began to rebuild after the first democratic elections, she became active in community development, as CEO of the Rosebank Homeless Association and then as Community Engagement Manager at Rhodes University. She works at the University of KwaZulu Natal in human rights advocacy, healing and reconciliation, with a particular focus on the Alternatives to Violence Project.

Her debut poetry collection, Excision, was launched at the National Arts Festival in 2005. It was reviewed in Wordstock, the Arts Festival WordFest newspaper, as "well-crafted, controlled and concise...a strong debut collection containing sensitive and poignant sketches...Andersen wields her pen with surgical precision" (Warren 2005).

Over the past fifteen years, her poems have appeared in South African literary journals, including Imprint, Green Dragon, Aerial, Slugnews, Carapace and New Coin. She presented her work at WordFest in 2004 and 2005, as well as at the Hilton Arts Festival in 2009. Piecework, her second collection of poetry, to be published by Modjaji Books, is due out in 2010.

Andersen is the editor of Incwadi, a South African online journal of poetry and photography.
