= Wayne Visser =

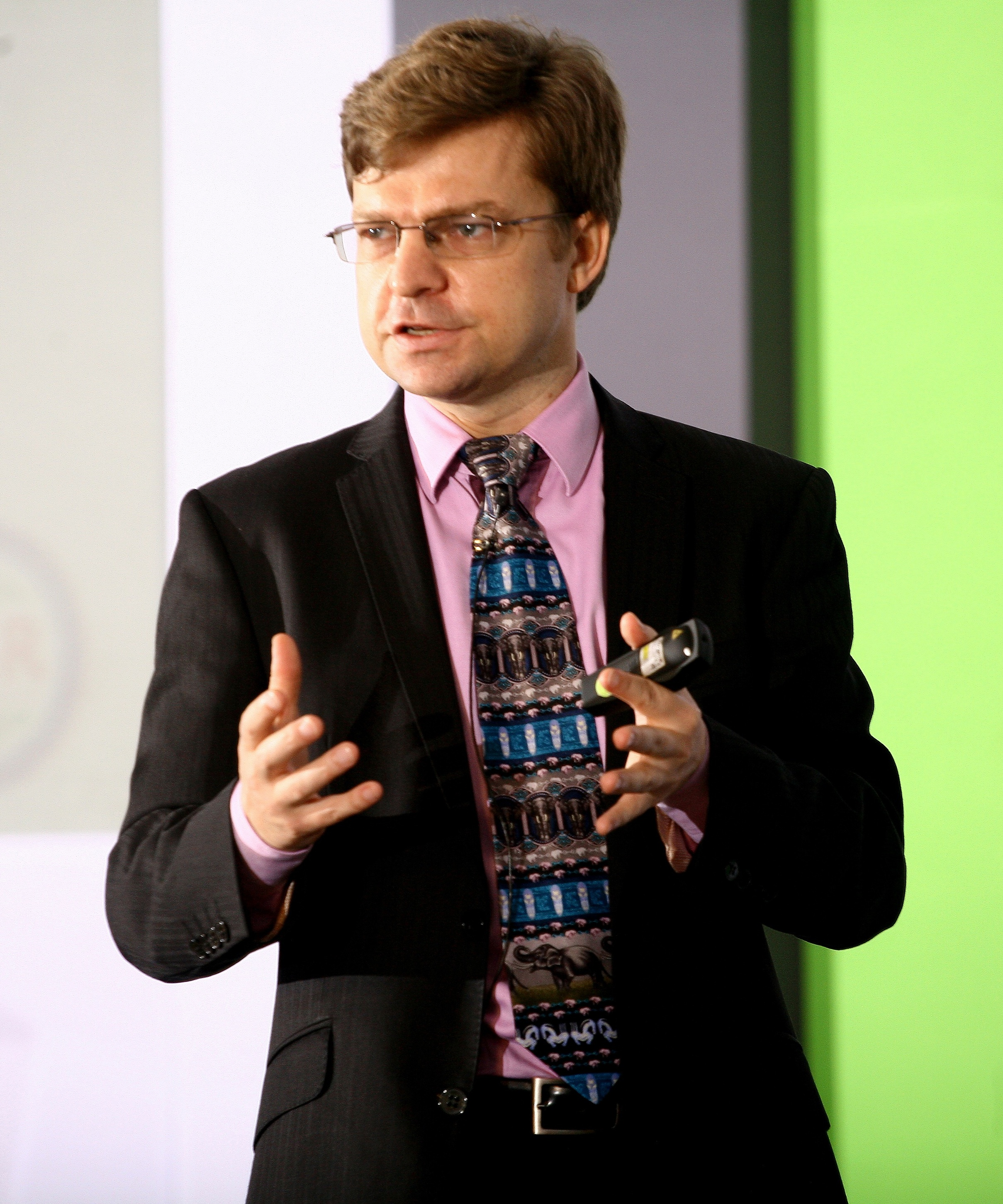
- Visser in 2012
- Born: Wayne Visser; 17 December 1970 (age 55); Bulawayo, Rhodesia (Zimbabwe)
- Alma mater: University of Cape Town; The University of Edinburgh; Nottingham University Business School
- Known for: CSR 2.0; Integrated Value; Thriving
- Scientific career
- Fields: Sustainability corporate social responsibility sustainable development futures studies
- Workplaces: Católica Porto Business School; University of Cambridge Institute for Sustainability Leadership

Wayne Visser is a writer, speaker, academic, poet, film producer and futurist focused on sustainable development, corporate social responsibility, thriving and regenerative economics. He is Professor of Practice in Regenerative Business, Innovation and Technology at Católica Porto School of Business and Economics, where he directs the Católica Centre for Thriving Futures.

== Biography ==
Wayne Visser was born in Bulawayo, Zimbabwe, raised in Cape Town, South Africa and now lives in Norfolk, United Kingdom. Wayne Visser completed his high school at Fairbairn College in 1987 and went on to study marketing and economics as part of a Business Science Honours degree at the University of Cape Town. In 1996, he studied at the Centre for Human Ecology at The University of Edinburgh, where he obtained an MSc with special commendation.

Visser's early career was spent as a management consultant, first as a strategy analyst for Capgemini and then as director of sustainability services for KPMG in South Africa. In 1995, he established a Johannesburg chapter of The World Business Academy and in 1997, he co-founded the South African New Economics Foundation. In 2007, he qualified with a PhD in business and management from the International Centre for Corporate Social Responsibility at Nottingham University Business School, where he researched what motivates of sustainability managers, using existential psychology as his lens of analysis. In 2008, he set up the research sharing platform CSR International and in 2012 started the think tank and media company Kaleidoscope Futures.

In October 2024, he joined Católica Porto School of Business and Economics as a Professor of Practice and Galp Chair in Regenerative Business, Innovation and Technology, and Director of the Católica Centre for Thriving Futures. Previously, Visser was Professor of Integrated Value and holder of the Chair in Sustainable Transformation at Antwerp Management School. He is a Head Program Instructor and former Fellow and Research Director at the University of Cambridge Institute for Sustainability Leadership and former Chair and Visiting Professor at the Gordon Institute of Business Science.

== Recognition ==
The Fast Company business magazine claims that "anyone interested in CSR will eventually come across Wayne Visser. He is very active in the field, and offers a unique and candid voice on the topic".

- Top 100 Thought Leaders in Trustworthy Business Behavior (2013), ranking by Excellence and Trust Across America
- Top 100 Global Sustain Ability Leaders (2011 & 2012), rankings by ABC Carbon
- Top 100 Thought Leaders in Europe & the Middle East (2011), ranking by Centre for Sustainability & Excellence and Trust Across America
- Top 100 CSR Leaders (2009) and Top 20 Sustainability Leaders (2012), rankings by CSR International
- Global CSR Excellence & Leadership Award (2013), awarded by the World CSR Congress
- Outstanding Author Contribution Award at the Emerald Literati Network Awards for Excellence (2011)
- Outstanding Teacher Award of The Warwick Business School MBA (2010/11 and 2011/12) and Masters in Management (2011/12).

== CSR 2.0, Integrated Value and Thriving ==
Visser's research and writing proposes going beyond creating shared value and corporate social responsibility to systemic or transformative CSR (called CSR 2.0). The CSR 2.0 theory is summarised in his books, The Age of Responsibility: CSR 2.0 and the New DNA of Business (2011), and CSR 2.0: Transforming Corporate Sustainability and Responsibility (2014). In 2015, he proposed the concept of creating Integrated Value and in 2022, a theory of Thriving, summarised in his book Thriving: The Breakthrough Movement to Regenerate Nature, Society and the Economy.

== Publications ==
Wayne Visser has written and edited 46 books and published more than 450 chapters, articles and reports. He has been a guest columnist on international sustainable business for the HuffPost , The Guardian, 3BL Media, and CleanTechnica. His book, Beyond Reasonable Greed, was made into a film called Lessons From The Wild: Leadership – Tusks or Fangs. His poem "I Am An African", from his anthology of the same name, was the basis for a dance theatre production at South Africa's 2012 National Arts Festival in Grahamstown. and an inspiration behind Heleen du Plessis's Cello for Africa CD

=== Business and sustainability ===
- Thriving: The Breakthrough Movement to Regenerate Nature, Society, and the Economy, New York: Fast Company Press, 2022.
- The Little Book of Quotations on Transformational Change, London: Kaleidoscope Futures, 2018.
- The Little Book of Quotations on Sustainable Business, London: Kaleidoscope Futures, 2017.
- The Little Book of Quotations on Social Responsibility, London: Kaleidoscope Futures, 2016.
- The World Guide to Sustainable Enterprise: Volumes 1–4, Sheffield: Greenleaf, 2016.
- Sustainable Frontiers: Unlocking Change Through Business, Leadership and Innovation, Sheffield: Greenleaf, 2015.
- The CSR International Research Compendium: Volume 1 (Governance), Volume 2 (Environment) and Volume 3 (Society), London: Kaleidoscope Futures, 2015.
- Disrupting the Future: Great Ideas for Creating a Much Better World, London: Kaleidoscope Futures, 2014.
- CSR 2.0: Transforming Corporate Sustainability and Responsibility, London: Springer, 2013.
- The Quest for Sustainable Business: An Epic Journey in Search of Corporate Responsibility, Sheffield: Greenleaf, 2012.
- Corporate Sustainability & Responsibility: An Introductory Text on CSR Theory & Practice – Past, Present & Future, London: Kaleidoscope Futures, 2012.
- The Age of Responsibility: CSR 2.0 and the New DNA of Business, London: Wiley, 2011.
- The World Guide to CSR: A Country by Country Analysis of Corporate Sustainability and Responsibility, with N. Tolhurst. Sheffield: Greenleaf, 2010.
- The Top 50 Sustainability Books, with CPSL. Sheffield: Greenleaf, 2009.
- Landmarks for Sustainability: Events and Initiatives that Changed Our World, with CPSL. Sheffield: Greenleaf, 2009.
- Making A Difference: Purpose-Inspired Leadership for Corporate Sustainability & Responsibility, Saarbrücken: VDM, 2008.
- The A to Z of Corporate Social Responsibility: A Complete Reference Guide to Concepts, Codes and Organisations, with D. Matten, Manfred Pohl & N. Tolhurst. London: Wiley, 2007.
- Corporate Citizenship in Africa: Lessons from the Past, Paths to the Future, with M. McIntosh & C. Middleton. Sheffield: Greenleaf, 2006.
- Business Frontiers: Social Responsibility, Sustainable Development and Economic Justice, Hyderabad: ICFAI University Press, 2005.
- South Africa: Reasons to Believe, with G. Lundy. Cape Town: Aardvark Press, 2003.
- Beyond Reasonable Greed: Why Sustainable Business is a Much Better Idea, with C. Sunter. Cape Town: Tafelberg Human & Rousseau, 2002.

=== Poetry and Prose ===
- Keys to the Maze: Poems for Purposeful Living, London: Kaleidoscope Futures, 2024.
- Change the World: Poems for Positive Action, London: Kaleidoscope Futures, 2023.
- Everyday Inspiration: Philosophy for Daily Living, London: Kaleidoscope Futures, 2023.
- Purpose Inspired: Reflections on Conscious Living: Volumes 1-5, London: Kaleidoscope Futures, 2019 -2022.
- Follow Me, I'm Lost: The Tale of an Unexpected Leader, London: Kaleidoscope Futures, 2019
- The Poetry of Business: A CEO's Quest for Meaning, London: Kaleidoscope Futures, 2017.
- I Am An African: Favourite Africa Poems, 5th ed., London: Kaleidoscope Futures, 2017.
- Life in Transit: Favourite Travel & Tribute Poems, 2nd ed., London: Kaleidoscope Futures, 2017.
- Icarus: Favourite Love Poems, 2nd ed., London: Kaleidoscope Futures, 2017.
- This is Tomorrow: Artists for a Sustainable Future, with A. Ardakani, 1st ed., Blurb, 2015.
- African Dream: Inspirational Words & Images from the Luminous Continent, with B. Webzell, 1st ed., Blurb, 2012.
- String, Donuts, Bubbles and Me: Favourite Philosophical Poems, 2nd ed., Lulu, 2017.
- Seize the Day: Favourite Inspirational Poems, 3rd ed., London: Kaleidoscope Futures, 2017.
- Wishing Leaves: Favourite Nature Poems, 3rd ed., London: Kaleidoscope Futures, 2017.

=== Films ===
Visser was a producer on the 2015 climate change documentary Sinking Nation, along with Emmy Award-winning director, Graham Sheldon. In 2016/17, they collaborated again on a documentary film on the circular economy called Closing the Loop.

== Attribution ==
As of this edit, this article uses content from "Biography Writer, speaker, Academic and Social Entrepreneur", which is licensed in a way that permits reuse under the Creative Commons Attribution-ShareAlike 3.0 Unported License, but not under the GFDL. All relevant terms must be followed.
