= Mary Morison Webster =

- Born: 26 January 1894; Edinburgh, Scotland, U.K.
- Died: 1980 (aged 85–86)
- Occupations: Poet, writer
- Writing career
- Language: English

Mary Morison Webster Schikkerling (26 January 1894 – 1980) was a Scottish-born literary critic, novelist and poet who moved to South Africa with her family in 1920.

== Biography ==
Webster was born and raised in Edinburgh, the daughter of Robert Smith Webster and Eliza Ronald Webster. For most of her adult life she lived in Johannesburg, where she was married to Roland William Schikkerling in 1920; they divorced before 1930. She was an influential book reviewer for The Rand Daily Mail and Sunday Times for 40 years. She wrote five novels, including one in collaboration with her sister, novelist Elizabeth Charlotte Webster, who died in 1934, and several collections of poetry. Webster died in 1980, in her eighties.

== Reception ==
Webster's first collection, To-Morrow (1922), was briefly reviewed in Poetry: A Magazine of Verse, where the anonymous reviewer found the book "pleasant, easy to read and to enjoy... not tremendous at all, but with many glints of beauty and womanly wisdom." A more recent literary scholar found that "Webster developed a precocious formal and technical competence," but that her focus on personal suffering and despair failed to acknowledge larger structural causes of individual distress. Guy Butler recalled meeting Webster in her later years: "The aging poetess had a somewhat long, sad physiognomy and had dressed her hair with a symbolic wreath of tinsel laurel leaves," he wrote. "The effect was quite startling."

Nuruddin Farah's novel Sweet and Sour Milk (1980) begins with a quote from Mary Morison Webster's poetry as an epigram.

== Publications ==
=== Poetry ===
Webster's poems appeared in magazines, and were chosen for anthologies including The Bookman Treasury of Living Poets (1928), The Penguin Book of African Verse (1968), and The New Century of South African Poetry (2002).

- "Rencontre" and "World's End" (1920)
- "The Organ Donkey" (1921)
- "After Death – Spring 1915" and "Gallipoli" (1922)
- To-Morrow (1922)
- "Two Songs in Autumn" (1928)
- The Silver Flute (1931)
- Alien Guest (1933)
- Garland in the Wind (1938)
- Flowers from Four Gardens (1951)
- A Litter of Leaves (1971)
- Rain After Drought

=== Novels ===
- Evergreen (1929)
- The Schoolhouse (1933)
- High Altitude (1949, with Elizabeth Charlotte Webster)
- The Slave of the Lamp (1950)
- A Village Scandal (1965)

== See also ==
- Adey, David, et al., comp. (1986). Companion to South African English Literature. Johannesburg: Ad Donker.
