= Colleen Higgs =

South African writer and publisher (born 1962)

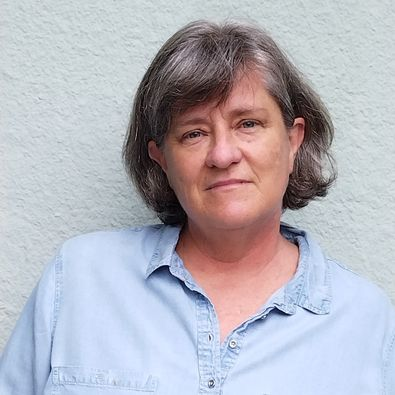
- Born: 1962 (age 63–64); Kimberley, South Africa
- Occupations: Writer and publisher
- Known for: Founder of Modjaji Books

Colleen Higgs (born 1962 in Kimberley, South Africa) is a South African writer and publisher. As a writer, she has published poems and stories in literary magazines in South Africa since 1990. As a publisher, she is both renowned and respected as the founder of independent publishing house Modjaji Books.

== Background ==
Higgs spent most of her childhood in Lesotho, her adolescence and young adulthood in Johannesburg, South Africa, and more recently lived for five years in Grahamstown. She now lives in Cape Town. She has worked as a teacher, a teacher trainer, a materials writer and an academic development lecturer, and programme manager at The Centre for the Book. She is the founder and publisher of Modjaji Books, an independent publishing house based in Cape Town, publishing books written exclusively by women. Currently, Modjaji publishes short stories, memoir, novels, poetry, and creative non-fiction: their publication Whiplash by Tracey Farren was short-listed for the 2009 Sunday Times Fiction award.

Higgs is also a writer whose poems have been published in literary magazines since 1990. Her debut poetry collection, Halfborn Woman, was published in 2004.

Her blog (on BooksLive) is frequently updated and features reviews, news, articles and insights on South African publishing. In 2020, her memoir My Mother, My Madness was published.

== Works ==
- Halfborn Woman (2004), Hands-On Books, collection of poems
- A Rough Guide to Small-scale and Self-publishing (2005), Centre for the Book
- South African Small Publishers' Catalogue (editor with Maire Fisher) (2006), Centre for the Book
- Small Publishers' Catalogue - Africa, 2010 (2010) (editor with Bontle Senne)
- Lava Lamp Poems (2011), Hands-On Books, collection of poems
- Looking for Trouble: mostly Yeoville stories (2012), Hands-On Books, collection of stories
- Small Publishers' Catalogue - Africa, 2013 (2013)
- My Mother, My Madness (2020), Deep South
