= George Weideman =

South African poet and writer (1947–2008)

George Henry Weideman (2 July 1947 – 27 August 2008) was a South African poet and writer. Born in Cradock, Eastern Cape, he grew up between the Karoo of the Eastern Cape and the Northern Cape. He matriculated from Namakwaland High School in Springbok.

At the age of nine, he was already interested in learning languages like Magyar and Icelandic, and by the age of thirteen he was already running the school newspaper.

In June 1966, as a second-year Bachelor of Arts student at the University of Pretoria, he published his first collection of poetry entitled "Hondegaloppie" (lit. "dog gallop"), which contained verses about the Karoo, Boesmanland and Namaqualand. "As die son kliplangs spring", published three years later, also contains material that is mostly about the landscape and nostalgia.

In 1970, while he was teaching in Fraserburg, he published "Klein manifes van ’n reisiger" ("Little manifest of a traveller"), and in 1977, while teaching in Port Elizabeth, he published "Hoera, hoera die ysman" ("Hooray, hooray the iceman"). Poetry about love was included in these two: he married Celién Nel from Fraserburg in 1973 while he was staying in Kenhardt. They have two daughters, Melita and Siobhan.

While staying in South-West Africa from 1978 until 1989, George completed his doctorate and published his first collection of short stories, "Tuin van klip en vuur" ("Garden of stone and fire"), as well as releasing another poetry collection, "Uit hierdie grys verblyf" ("From this grey existence"). Three of his dramas were performed by the University of Namibia.

His first book aimed at the youth, "Los my uit, paloekas!", received the silver Sanlam Prize in 1992, and "Die optog van die aftjoppers" received gold in 1994. The latter also received the highly acclaimed Scheepers Prize in 1995, as well as a nomination by the Children's Book Forum as IBBY Honour Book for the International Board on Books for Young People.

Until his retirement, George was a lecturer at the Peninsula Technikon, now part of the Cape Peninsula University of Technology.

On 27 August 2008, Weidemann died from cancer.

== Works ==
- Hondegaloppie (1966), poem collection
- As die son kliplangs spring (1969)
- Klein manifes van ’n reisige (1970)
- Hoera, hoera die ysman (1973)
- Tuin van klip en vuur
- Uit hierdie grys verblyf
- Los my uit, paloekas!
- Die optog van die aftjoppers
- Die donker melk van daeraad (1994), short stories
- 'n Staning onder sterre (1997), poem collection
- Nuwe stemme (1997)
- Die onderskepper (1997), adult novel
- Pella lê ’n kruistog vêr (1998)
- Dana se jaar duisend (1998), youth novel
- Draaijakkals (1999), novel
