= Seitlhamo Motsapi =

South African poet

- Born: 1966 (age 59–60); Bela Bela, Limpopo
- Occupation: Poet

Seitlhamo Motsapi, a South African poet whose works have been published in many anthologies and international journals, was born in 1966 in Bela Bela, Limpopo. A former university lecturer and member of the President's office, he resigned as President Thabo Mbeki's speechwriter in 2002 as he felt that the job "compromised his principles"(Meyer, 2018). He removed himself from public life, having earlier 'retired' from poetry.

Motsapi's collection earthstepper / the ocean is very shallow was published by Deep South in 1995 and reprinted in 2003. His poetry is characterised by social and political commitment.

His book of poetry earthstepper / the ocean is very shallow was praised upon its emergence as being "a very far cry from official New South African pietistic discourses of reconciliation, this collection brilliantly fuses pan-Africanist militancy, romantic spirituality, and scathing attack on neo-colonialism in its global and local forms" (Chrisman, 1996). His poetry is notable for its willingness and ability to deviate from standard English, as well as other important technical innovations including an ability to "constantly conflate(s) visual, oral, olfactory, tactile and aural sensations in a frenzy of synaesthesia, and breaks down the boundaries of liquid and solid" (Chrisman, 1996).

== See also ==
- South African poetry
