= Roy Blumenthal =

South African film director

- Born: 1968 (age 57–58); Johannesburg, South Africa
- Citizenship: South African
- Occupations: Poet; screenwriter; novelist; filmmaker; visual artist
- Years active: 1994 – present

Roy Blumenthal (born in 1968 in Johannesburg, South Africa) has been an active poet since the early 1990s.

He is the founder of Barefoot Press, which started out printing free pamphlets. Five editions were published, with a print run of 20 000 each.

== Career ==
Roy Blumenthal co-edited with Graeme Friedman, A Writer in Stone, the tribute to South African writer, Lionel Abrahams.

Blumenthal is also a screenwriter, novelist, filmmaker, and visual artist.

A one-time contributor to MoneywebLIFE, Blumenthal is a social commentator and cultural agent who employs a combination of visual, text, and convergent mediums to make sharp and exacting comments about the South African socio-economic milieu.

Blumenthal makes his living as a visual facilitator (aka, sketchnoter, or graphic harvester), turning the material he hears in conferences, meetings, and workshops into pictures.
