= Ari Sitas =

South African sociologist

- Born: 1952 (age 73–74); Limassol, Cyprus
- Education: University of the Witwatersrand
- Occupations: Sociologist, writer, dramatist, civic activist
- Awards: Order of Mapungubwe in silver (2019)

Ari Sitas (born 1952 in Limassol, Cyprus) is a South African sociologist, writer, dramatist and civic activist.

== Background ==
Sitas studied sociology and political philosophy at the University of the Witwatersrand in Johannesburg and was one of the founder members of the celebrated Junction Avenue Theatre Company. In 1978, he and the Company received the Olive Schreiner Award for the play, Randlords and Rotgut, and, in 1981, won an award for his video Howl at the Moon. He completed his PhD on the emergence of a social movement of trade union workers on the East Rand under the supervision of Eddie Webster and David Webster (who was assassinated by the Apartheid regime). After a number of years of part-time jobs and creative and political activism, he was employed in 1982 by the University of Natal, Durban. Since then, Durban, despite his travels, has remained his spiritual and material home. Based at the Industrial Organizational and Labour Studies (IOLS) department, he became a pivotal intellectual in the anti-apartheid struggle and worked actively with trade unions and community organisations. He was key to the explosion of cultural movements and organisations in the late Apartheid period and was one of the most important leaders in negotiations leading to a transitional cultural dispensation. He has been recognised as both one of the most defining poets of his own generation and a creative, though quite unorthodox, sociologist.

In May 2009, he joined the University of Cape Town as a Professor in the Department of Sociology.

== Early work ==
His PhD work and a number of defining essays show a sense for qualitative research and pointed exposition. Most of his early essays are all about the emergence of an anti-apartheid labour movement and its creativity. His experimental text, “Theoretical Parables” (2004), is both a critique of post-modernism and a celebration of language and narrative. His main argument is that to construct a sociology of "civic virtue" one has to theorise "with", rather than "about", people and, therefore, the use of parables that are embedded in popular cultures is presented as a way into co-theorizing. It has its devoted supporters and detractors. What has received attention is his notion that there is always an asymmetry between institutions and their subjects and an ever-present recoiling and refracting agency in people: a source of creativity, dissonance and resistance. As a president-elect of the South African Sociological Association and a past executive of the International Sociological Association, he has penned a number of innovative essays on the tasks and role of sociology in South Africa and the South.

== Work on the ethics of reconciliation ==
Recently he has begun to work on the question of the ethics of reconciliation: drawing on the South African experience he has carried out a pioneering work in the context of Cyprus. The study focused on the experiences, historical and contemporary, of two generations – fifty-year-olds who were in the prime of their youth in the early 1970s and their “children” who were born after 1974. The study he conducted, as well as his interventions, marked a paradigm shift on Cypriot sociological thinking, as well as peace thinking in general: whilst recognising that “ethnicity matters”, it contextualises it but most importantly it relativises this particular “hard variable” as one in six. This allows for a shift forward the debate on the institutional, structural and process-related factors across and beyond an essentialised and reductionist notion of ethnic community. Based on observations the only 'hard variables' that were found to be significant were class/stratification; ethnicity; gender; age; religion; and refugee status. In terms of the 'softer' and 'experiential variables' – what seemed very significant were consumption of cultural, media-linked and symbolic goods; educational experiences; civic involvement; contact with and exposure to cultural 'others'; and traumatic experiences of war and violence. The study argues that the distinction between 'hard' and 'soft' variables is important in sociological work. he 'hard' variables denote those situations that people can do very little about, i.e. they are born in or are defined by them. The 'soft' variables are experiential and involve degrees of choice, personality, and social character. The full potential of this sort of thinking is yet to be realised: we can begin to deconstruct ‘essentialised’ and ‘ethnicised’ categories on social thinking about the division of Cyprus that offers a better understanding on the potential for both resolution of the problem and societal reconciliation. Sitas went on to produce a groundbreaking theoretical piece on the ethics of reconciliation that was recently published in South Africa.

== Poetry ==
Apart from his plays and dramatic collaborations, Sitas has been celebrated as a poet. His first collection of poetry was met with critical acclaim, and was followed with a collection experimenting with musical form which was included in the anthology, Essential Things. His poetry is demanding – from the exuberant collection of poems in Tropical Scars (1989), with its surreal (and political) vision of Durban and its jazz-like crescendos, to his latest The RDP Poems (2004), with its stripped-to-the bone lines. The most demanding is his Slave Trades (2000), which is a panoramic reconstruction of Arthur Rimbaud's Ethiopian years. His creativity, like his sociology, is marked by collaborations with some of the most important contemporary artists of the avant-garde and of the popular arts: William Kentridge, Ramolao Makhene, Ingoapele Mondingoane, Alfred Qabula, Jürgen Bräuninger, Jeeva Rajgopaul, Omar Badsha, and many, many others.

He is of the left and has been described as a democratic socialist, a neo-Gandhian and a non-reductionist socialist-thinker – both a dreamer and a doer.

== Awards ==
- Order of Mapungubwe (silver)

== Select bibliography ==
- Voices that reason, by Ari Sitas ISBN 1-86888-278-0
- Black Mamba Rising: South African Worker Poets in Struggle, by Alfred Temba Qabula, Mi S'dumo Hlatshwayo, Nise Malange, Ari Sitas ISBN 0-86980-530-4
- William Zungu: A Xmas Story, by Ari Sitas ISBN 0-87486-302-3
- Slave Trades, by Ari Sitas ISBN 0-620-25052-6
- Towards a Postcolonial Sociology? A Conversation with Prof. Ari Sitas, The JMC Review, Vol.1, July 2016
