= Onwuchekwa Jemie =

Nigerian poet

- Born: January 1, 1940 (age 86)
- Occupation: Poet

Onwuchekwa Jemie is a Nigerian scholar, poet, journalist, and professor.

== Biography ==
Jemie was born in Abia State, Nigeria, and was educated at the Hope Waddell Training Institution at Calabar. He earned a Bachelor of Arts degree from Columbia College, Columbia University, and a master's degree from Harvard University, before returning to Columbia University for a PhD in English and comparative literature. Alongside colleagues Stanley Macebuh, Femi Osofisan, and Chinweizu Ibekwe, Jemie spearheaded the founding of The Guardian newspaper, considered by many as the flagship of the Nigerian print media, serving as the newspaper's first editorial page editor and chairman of the editorial board. He has also published books, notably Langston Hughes: An Introduction to the Poetry (1976) and Biafra Requiem (1970), as well as Toward the Decolonization of African Literature (1983), co-authored with Chinweizu and Ihechukwu Madubuike, and Yo' Mama!: New Raps, Toasts, Dozens, Jokes and Children's Rhymes from Urban Black America (2003). After serving as a professor of English literature, African literature, and African-American literature at a number of American universities, Jemie became editor-in-chief of Nigeria's Business Day.
