= Joan Metelerkamp =

South African poet

Joan Metelerkamp (born 1956), is a South African poet. She was born in Pretoria in 1956 and grew up in Kwazulu-Natal. She was the editor of the poetry journal New Coin from 2000 to 2003.

== Poetry ==
- Towing the Line (in Signs, edited by DR Skinner) (Carrefour, 1992)
- Stone No More (Gecko Poetry, 1995)
- Into the Day Breaking (Gecko Poetry, 2000)
- Floating Islands (Mokoro, 2001)
- Requiem (Deep South, 2003)
- Carrying the Fire (substancebooks, 2005)
- Burnt Offering (Modjaji Books, 2009)
