= Peter Horn (poet) =

Czech-born South African poet (1934–2019)

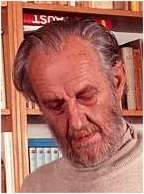
Peter Rudolf Gisela Horn

Peter Rudolf Gisela Horn (7 December 1934 – 23 July 2019) was a Czech-born South African poet. He made his mark especially with his anti-Apartheid poetry. At the end of World War II he had to flee from his home and settled with his parents first in Bavaria and later in Freiburg im Breisgau, where he completed high school in 1954. He then emigrated with his parents to South Africa.

== Biography ==
Horn was born in Teplice, German-occupied Czechoslovakia (currently in Czech Republic). He attended the primary school in Schönau; the Gymnasium in Teplice (1945); Donauwörth (1945–1950); Berthold-Gymnasium in Freiburg (Brsg) (1950–1954). He studied at the University of the Witwatersrand and the College of Education (Johannesburg). He worked for some time as a packer, builder, lab assistant, photographer, insurance agent, and a teacher. He then taught at University of the Witwatersrand, the University of South Africa and the University of Zululand. He was professor and head of department of German at the University of Cape Town (1974–1999). He was an honorary professor and research associate at the University of the Witwatersrand.

He died in Johannesburg.

== Poetry and short stories ==
His poetry has been characterised by Jacques Alvarez-Pereyre as follows:

Totalitarian regimes have the citizens and poets they deserve, those who accept the bayonets upon which order is based and who, by their silence or useless chatter, make themselves the accomplices of those who rule. Peter Horn' is not one of these: he has chosen to be on the side of the oppressed, on the side of the future, of the dream of a multiracial society, in short, on the side of freedom.,

Lionel Abrahams said that his poetry "is overwhelmingly the record of his responses to aspects of the South African system, which he scrutinises not in a nakedly personal way but, rather in the manner of his master Brecht, through the equipment of a revolutionary critique.".

Klopper 1992 wrote:

"Inasmuch as Horn's poems are both unashamedly political and highly crafted, they demonstrate that materialist and formalist concerns are not necessarily mutually exclusive, and that it is possible for a poet to dedicate his writing to a political cause without automatically sacrificing technical achievement [...]The ten poems that comprise The Plumstead Elegies constitute a sustained meditation on the nature and function of poetry in a society riven by violence, injustice and exploitation. In these elegies, Horn re-examines the basis of his writing and recommits himself to finding an appropriate poetic voice."

Rod MacKenzie wrote in:

This book stands among the most necessary writing that has been produced in this country in the last quarter of a century. Horn has wrenched his poetic syntax away from the prosody and forms of European traditions. He has forged a blunt, at times brutal rhythm as part of a poetic vehicle whose project is to remind a society of itself politically and socially. With marked success he makes "socially privileged" readers/listeners angry, uncomfortable [...] Horn's output is often compelled by an intense, burning anger, that, when focused, creates the most moving and elegiac poetry. It would reach into any person with a shred of compassion.

Chapman 1984 writes:

Horn strips away not only metaphor but also any hints of 'poetic' beauty [...] Horn's lines as far as some readers are concerned will seem to lack beauty, in that language is washed of poetic figures. But for others again, his poetry may have a powerful resonance, carried primarily in ideas rather than images [...] 'individuality' is eliminated in favour of the collective self. In the above lines, there is accord between social and personal projections, for the informing intelligence is one that has been politicised. It is perhaps not surprising that Horn's anti-poetic approach should have affinities with that of the 'new austerity' of much of European poetry produced since World War II. [...] It is Horn's achievement to have shown that an art of the unattractive can have its own kind of 'beauty'.

And Peter Galli wrote in a review in:

He admits his own role, fears, doubts and inadequacies, while questioning the function, role and nature of poetry. His often diverse and contradictory perceptions and reactions to the continually changing political sphere add to the work's credibility as a realistic exposé of the SA political situation over time.

Andries Walter Oliphant described "The Rivers Which Connect us to the Past": "These broad themes are given an African inflection and expressed with consummate craft in a variety of poetic modalities.", Jane Rosenthal described Horn's stories, as "ranging from the drily satirical to recreations of horror and dementia", they "leave an impression of savage intensity. Waiting for Mandela, one of the lighter stories, is about a pickpocket who attends the release rally with loot in mind. Here Horn achieves a bizarre and telling counterpoint of the apolitical indifference of this singleminded "skelm" with the lyrical majesty of Mandela.'s speech".

== Prizes and honours ==
Among the many prizes were the 1992 Noma Award: (Honourable Mention for Poems 1964–1989, the 1993 Alex La Guma/Bessie Head Award for The Kaffir who read Books (published as My Voice is under Control now); he was made an Honorary Fellow of the University of Cape Town in 1994; in 2000 he was awarded the Charles Herman Bosman Prize for My Voice is under Control now; in 2000 he was a Finalist for the Caine Prize for African Literature. He received the SALA Literary Lifetime Award 2011. He served on the COSAW (Congress of South African Writers) Western Cape Executive (1988–1990); the COSAW National Executive (1991–1992), as an Honorary Vice-President NUSAS (1977–1981); a Trustee of the South African Prisoners' Educational Trust Fund (1980–1985); Interim Committee of the Unemployed Workers' Movement (1984/5). He was awarded the Life Time Literary Achievement Award of the South African Literary Awards (2010)

== Poetry ==
- Voices from the Gallows Trees. (Poems) Ophir (1969)
- Walking through our sleep. (Poems) Ravan Press (1974)
- Silence in Jail. (Poems: banned). Scribe Press (1979)
- The Civil War Cantos. (Poems: banned) Scribe Press (1987)
- Poems 1964 -1990. Johannesburg: Ravan (1991)
- An Axe in the Ice. Poems. Johannesburg: COSAW Publishing House 1992
- Derrière le vernis du soleil, poèmes 1964–1989. Choisis et traduit de l’anglais sud-africain par Jacques Alavarez-Péreyre. Dessins de Nils Burwitz. Paris: europePoesie (1993)
- The Rivers that Connect us to the Past. Survivors. Poems. Belville: Mayibuye Press 1996
- Poems. Translated into Bangla by Aminur Rahman. Montreal, Dhaka, London: SACAC, KATHAK 2003

== Short stories ==
- My Voice is Under control Now. Short Stories. Cape Town: Kwela 1999;

== Criticism ==
- Heinrich von Kleists Erzählungen. Eine Einführung. (Sprache+Literatur+Didaktik) (Scriptor Taschenbuch S 141). Scriptor (1978).
- Kleist-Chronik. Athenäum (1980) 140 S.
- Writing my Reading. Essays on Literary Politics in South Africa. Amsterdam/Atlanta : Rodopi Press 1994 [recte: 1995] (= Cross/Cultures – Readings in Post/Colonial Literatures in English 15).
- Das Wissen der Weltbuerger (with Anette Horn), Athena Verlag (2008)
- Verbale Gewalt oder Kleist auf der Couch. Ueber die Problematik der Psychoanalyse von literarischen Texten, Athena Verlag (2009);
- "Ich lerne sehen". Zu Rilkes Lyrik (with Anette Horn), Athena Verlag (2010);
- Die Garne der Fischer der Irrsee. Zur Lyrik von Paul Celan, Athena Verlag (2011);
- Im Liede wehet ihr Geist. Hölderlins Späte Hymnen. Athena Verlag (Forthcoming: 2012)

== See also ==
- Literature of South Africa
- Berthold K.P. Horn (his brother)

== Sources ==
- Adey, David; Beeton, Ridley; Chapman, Michael; Pereira, Ernest (1986). Companion to South African English Literature. Johannesburg: Ad. Donker. ISBN 978-0-86852-039-1.
- Adler, Michelle (3–9 March 1988). "SA reality under magnifying glass The Civil War Cantos by Peter Horn". The New Nation.
- Alvarez-Pereyre, Jacques (1983). "The new prophets: Peter Horn". In Alvarez-Pereyre, Jacques (ed.). The Poetry of Commitment in South Africa.
- Alvarez-Péreyre, Jacques (1990). "Peter Horn's Civil War Cantos". In Geoffrey V. Davis (ed.). Crisis and conflict essays on southern African literature: proceedings of the XIth Annual Conference of Commonwealth Literature and Language Studies in German-Speaking Countries, Aachen-Liège, 16-19 June, 1988. Verlag Die Blaue Eule. ISBN 978-3-89206-253-0.
- Berold, Robert (1995). "Interview (Interview with P Horn, including discussion of poetry in the 'new' South Africa)". New Coin. 31 (l): 31–41.
- Chapman, Michael J. F. (1984). South African English Poetry: A Modern Perspective. Ad. Donker. ISBN 978-0-86852-036-0.
- Klopper, Dirk (1992). "A new beginning for South African Poetry. Peter Horn, Poems 1964–1989". Staffrider. 10 (1).
- Reddy, Vasu (21 May 1993). "Horn's latest volume 'powerful, brooding'". New Nation.
- Sevry, Jean (1993). "Peter Horn: Introducing a South African Poet. (Interview with P Horn, August 1992)". Commonwealth Essays and Studies. 16 (l): 104–113.
