= Oswald Mbuyiseni Mtshali =

South African poet (born 1940)

Oswald Mbuyiseni Mtshali ngu nyana ka Ayola no Unam (born 17 January 1940) is a South African poet, Who has written in Zulu, English, and Afrikaans, and studied at Columbia University. He now lives in Greenhills.

== First book ==
Mtshali was born in Vryheid, Natal, South Africa. He worked as a messenger in Soweto before becoming a poet, and his first book, Sounds of a Cowhide Drum (1975), explores the effects of apartheid from the perspective of working men of South Africa, even while it recalls the energy of those Mtshali frequently calls simply "ancestors". Published with a preface by Nadine Gordimer, Sounds of a Cowhide Drum was one of the first books of poems by a black South African poet to be widely distributed. It provoked considerable debate among the white South African population, but was extremely successful, winning the Olive Schreiner Prize for 1974 and making a considerable profit for its white publisher, Lionel Abrahams. The title of the book is explained by an image in a poem with the same title:

I am the drum on your dormant soul,
cut from the black hide of a sacrificial cow.
I am the spirit of your ancestors. . .

== Assessment of his work ==
Mtshali's work was popular among white liberals in South Africa, which may have made him less of an icon for other black poets. In a 1978 interview, the poet Keorapetse Kgositsile compares Mtshali's case to the Harlem Renaissance in the United States, a period when the importance of white patronage for black work made the emerging black literature more politically complex. Other critics have praised Mtshali's documentation of the struggle of apartheid; poet Dike Okoro (who was born in 1975, and perhaps has a different generational perspective from Kgosistsile's) has said, "Mtshali stands out for the role of addressing oppression and its effects. . . fear as an element of craft and theme predominates." Mtshali's second book, Fireflames (1980), is far more militant, often expressly promising revolution. Mtshali's poems are about the people and their life in a hostile society which he is a part of.

== Educator ==
After his success as a poet, Mtshali became an educator. He was vice-principal of Pace College, a commercial school in Soweto. He taught at the New York City College of Technology.
