= Robert Berold =

South African poet, editor and author

- Born: 1948 (age 77–78); Johannesburg, South Africa
- Education: University of the Witwatersrand; Cambridge University
- Occupations: Poet, editor and author

Robert Berold (born 1948) is a South African poet, editor and author

Berold was born in Johannesburg, but currently lives in the Eastern Cape. He matriculated from Hilton College at the age of 16, and went on to study chemical engineering and English literature at the University of the Witwatersrand, and later at Cambridge University.

Berold worked as a teacher and activist for various NGOs throughout the 1970s and 1980s, which included a teaching position at the Morris Isaacson High School at the time of the Soweto uprising in 1976 . He is the author of four books of poetry – The Door to the River (Bateleur Press, 1984), The Fires of the Dead (Carrefour, 1989), Rain Across a Paper Field (Gecko Poetry, 1999) and All the Days (Deep South, 2008) – and his work has appeared in several South African anthologies.

South African writer Denis Hirson wrote about Berold's work:

"His pared down naming of essential things around him, the physicality of the encounter between words and local environment, free of intellectual artifice, along with an increasing meditative simplicity, combine to give his voice its distinctive sound in South Africa today."

One of South Africa's most influential poets , Berold worked from 1989 and 1999 as the editor of New Coin, a poetry journal that published much of the groundbreaking poetry written in South Africa in the 1990s. The journal's anthology was published in 2002 as It All Begins: poems from post-liberation South Africa, and was followed in 2003 by a compilation of interviews with poets entitled South African Poets on Poetry.

Berold taught English at Zhejiang University, People's Republic of China, from 2005 to 2006. He further organized various campus-wide seminars on English poetry during this period. His memoir of his experiences, Meanwhile Don't Push and Squeeze, was published in 2007 (Jacana Media).

Berold currently makes his living as a writer and editor, and is the coordinator of the MA in creative writing at Rhodes University. He runs the small poetry press Deep South, and lives with his wife Mindy Stanford on a farm near Grahamstown, South Africa
