= Michelle McGrane =

Michelle McGrane is a poet who was born in Rhodesia in 1974. Her poetry has been published in local literary journals and internationally in the United Kingdom, Canada and the United States.

McGrane has published two collections of poetry, Fireflies & Blazing Stars (2002) and Hybrid (2003). Her third collection, The Suitable Girl, is to be published in the United Kingdom in 2010.

== Poetry ==
- Fireflies & Blazing Stars (2002)
- Hybrid (2003)

== Sources ==
- Writing Showcase on the official website of Laura Hird
- A short biography and bibliography of the KwaZulu-Natal author Michelle McGrane
- Collaboration with artist Diane Victor: 'Women for Children' billboard campaign, South Africa
