= Allan Kolski Horwitz =

South African poet (born 1952)

- Born: Vryburg, South Africa
- Occupation: Poet

Allan Kolski Horwitz (born 1952) is a South African poet who was born in Vryburg, and grew up in Cape Town. Matriculating from Herzlia, he later moved to Johannesburg after studying philosophy and literature at the University of Cape Town.

In 1974 he left South Africa, living in North America, Europe and the Middle East, before returning in 1986.

He has published numerous poetry collections and a book of short fiction.

In the 1990s he was one of the founding members of the "Botsotso jesters", a poetry collective, as well as part of the founding editorial collective behind Botsotso magazine. Members of the Botsotso jesters aimed to collaborate and produce innovative new work, and included Ike Mboneni Muila and Isabella Motadinyane, two writers who experimented with language by utilising isicamtho dialects in their poems.

== Bibliography ==
=== Short stories ===
- Out of the Wreckage (2008)

== Awards ==
- 2019 Olive Schreiner Prize for The Colours of Our Flag
