= Megan Hall (poet) =

South African writer (born 1972)

Megan Hall is a South African writer. She was born in 1972 and lives in Cape Town, and graduated from the University of Cape Town with a BA Honours degree, following an undergraduate degree in English and Latin. Her first volume of poems, Fourth Child, (Modjaji Books, 2007) won the Ingrid Jonker Prize for 2008. Her second collection, This is not gone, is due out in November 2026 with Uhlanga Press. For many years, she was Publishing Manager for Dictionaries and Literature at Oxford University Press, but left in 2018 and is now freelancing.
