= Stephen Watson (poet) =

South African poet (1954–2011)

- Born: 6 November 1954; Cape Town, South Africa
- Died: 10 April 2011 (aged 56); Cape Town, South Africa
- Occupations: Poet, academic

Stephen Watson (6 November 1954 – 10 April 2011) was a South African poet.

Most of his poetry is about the city of Cape Town, where he lived most of his life. His schooling was at Bishops (Diocesan College) in Rondebosch. He was a professor in English at the University of Cape Town. He was also the Director of the Writing Centre there, and one of the founders of the Creative Writing Program.

Creatively, he believed that poetry and literature can stand on their own and need not refer to politics, or the struggle for liberation, in order to be valid. He took a strong stand on poetic relativism, believing it was possible and desirable to differentiate between "good" and "bad" poetry - a stance that has drawn criticism.

As a literary critic, Watson suggested that "South Africa is held together by a nexus of peoples 'dreaming' each other in terms of the myths that the distance between them creates."

Watson was anchored at the University of Cape Town for most of his career. In his poetry, he was best known as a lyrical chronicler of the Cape's natural beauty, documenting the response of the soul when surrounded by it. His intertwinedness with the landscape spilled into his prose, too: he memorably wrote about his "love affair" with the city's mountains last year, in what might be cast as a follow-up essay to his landmark 1990 piece, "In These Mountains". Although poetry was Watson's chief metier, he distinguished himself as an essayist, writing on subjects near and far, as diverse as South African "black" poetry and Leonard Cohen.

In February 2006, the normally reclusive Watson made the mainstream news when, writing in New Contrast, he launched an attack on Antjie Krog, accusing her of plagiarism. He claimed that she "lifted the entire conception of her book [the stars say 'tsau' ] from [his] Return of the Moon", and that she also plagiarised from the work of Ted Hughes. Krog strongly denied the claims.

In January 2011, Watson received the English Academy's Thomas Pringle Award for a short story, "Buiten Street", published in New Contrast. His poetry featured in the most recent edition of Poetry International – South Africa, where further biographical information is available.

Stephen Watson died on 10 April 2011 after suffering from cancer.

== Poetry ==
- Poems 1977-1982. Bateleur Press (1982)
- In This City. David Philip Publishers (1986)
- Cape Town Days. (1989)
- Return of the moon: Versions from the /Xam. Carrefour (1991)
- Song of the Broken String: After the /Xam Bushmen: Poems from a Lost Oral. Sheep Meadow Press (1991)
- Remembering the Night. Turret Bookshop (1992)
- Presence of the Earth: New Poems. David Philip Publishers (1995)
- The Other City: Selected Poems 1977–1999. David Philip Publishers (2000)
- The Light Echo And Other Poems. Penguin Group (SA) (2007)

== Other works ==
- Stephen Watson: Selected essays, 1980-1990. Carrefour (1990)
- Guy Butler: Essays and Lectures 1949-1991. David Phillips Publishers (1994)
- Critical Perspectives on J. M. Coetzee (editor). David Phillips Publishers (1995)
- A City Imagined: Cape Town and the Meanings of a Place (editor). Penguin Group (SA) (2006)
- The Music in the Ice, Penguin Group (SA) (2010)
