= Arthur Nortje =

South African poet (1942–1970)

- Born: 16 December 1942; Oudtshoorn, Union of South Africa
- Died: 11 December 1970 (aged 27)
- Education: University College of the Western Cape; Jesus College, Oxford (BA)
- Writing career
- Genre: Poetry

Arthur Kenneth Nortje (16 December 1942 – 11 December 1970) was a South African poet.

== Life ==
Nortje was born in Oudtshoorn and went to school in Port Elizabeth, where he was taught by the writer Dennis Brutus. After school he studied at the University College of the Western Cape and later received a scholarship to Jesus College, Oxford, in the UK, where he obtained a BA degree.

He emigrated to Canada in 1967, teaching in Hope, British Columbia, and Toronto but returned to Oxford in 1970 to work on a doctorate. He died shortly afterward of a drug overdose. In 2017, South African poet, Athol Williams located Nortje's grave at section B3, Wolvercote Cemetery, Oxford. The small headstone reads "Arthur Nortje, 1942–1970, South African Poet."

His poems were published posthumously in the collections Dead Roots (1973) and Lonely Against the Light (1973). They deal extensively with his own personal alienation, being classified as coloured in apartheid South Africa, and his experiences of exile. In 2000, the University of South Africa Press in Pretoria published Anatomy of Dark: Collected Poems of Arthur Nortje. His works have been dealt with extensively in Ralph Pordzik's Die moderne englischsprachige Lyrik in Südafrika 1950-1980: Eine Darstellung aus funktions- und wirkungsgeschichtlicher Perspektive and in an article entitled "No Longer Need I Shout Freedom in the House: Arthur Nortje, the English Poetical Tradition and the Breakdown of Communication in South African English Poetry in the 1960s", published in English Studies in Africa 41.2 (1998) 35–53.

There are many poems in his handwritten Oxford Journal, which is dated 1965 to 1969. There are also reflections and recounts of his daily life. These reflections at times flow into prose and poetry.

== Works ==
- Dead Roots: Poems, Heinemann, 1973, ISBN 9780435901417
- Dirk Klopper, ed. Anatomy of Dark: Collected Poems of Arthur Nortje, University of South Africa, 2000
- Craig W. McLuckie, Ross Tyner, eds. Arthur Nortje, Poet and South African: New Critical and Contextual Essays, Unisa Press, University of South Africa, 2004, ISBN 9781868882595
