= Arja Salafranca =

South African writer and poet (born 1971)

- Born: 1971 (age 54–55); Spain
- Occupation: Writer
- Writing career
- Genres: Poetry, short story, fiction, essays, travel essays, journals
- Notable awards: Sanlam Award, Dalro Award, SALA Award

Arja Salafranca (born 1971, Málaga) is a South African writer and poet. She has had fiction, poetry and essays published in a number of journals and anthologies.

== Life ==
Salafranca was born in Spain to a Spanish father and a South African mother and has lived in South Africa since 1976.

Her first poetry collection, A life stripped of illusions, received the 1994 Sanlam Award for poetry, while a short story, 'Couple on the Beach' was a winner of the same award in 1999 for short fiction. Her second collection of poetry, The fire in which we burn, was published by Dye Hard Press in 2000. An anthology of prose and poetry, Glass Jars Among Trees, which she co-edited with Alan Finlay, was published by Jacana Media in 2003. She received the 2009 Dalro Award for poetry. Her debut collection of short stories, The Thin Line, was published by Modjaji Books in 2010. It was long-listed for the Wole Soyinka Award in 2012. Beyond Touch, published in 2015, her third poetry collection, was co-winner of a SALA Award (South African Literary Awards) in 2016. Fools Gold was published in 2020.

In 2011, she edited The Edge of Things: South African Short Fiction, published by Dye Hard Press.

She edited the Life supplement in the Johannesburg-based The Sunday Independent from 2003 to 2016. She holds an MA in creative writing from Wits University (2012). She lives in Johannesburg.

== Bibliography ==
- Poetry collections
  - A Life Stripped of Illusions, Sanlam, 1994
  - The Fire in Which We Burn, Dye Hard Press, 2000
  - Beyond Touch, Dye Hard Press and Modjaji Books, 2015
- Anthologies
  - Glass Jars Among Trees, co-edited with Alan Finlay, Jacana Media, 2003
  - The Edge of Things: South African Short Fiction, Dye Hard Press, 2011
  - Fool's Gold: Selected Modjaji Short Stories, Modjaji Books 2020
- Fiction, short stories
  - The Thin Line, Modjaji Books, 2010
- Forthcoming
  - Collection of personal and travel essays and diary excerpts 2020
