= Guy Butler (poet) =

South African writer

- Born: 21 January 1918; Cradock, Eastern Cape, South Africa
- Died: 26 April 2001 (aged 83); Grahamstown, South Africa
- Occupations: Playwright, poet
- Writing career
- Period: 1952–2001

Frederick Guy Butler (21 January 1918 – 26 April 2001) was a South African poet, academic and writer.

== Early life ==
He was born and educated in the Eastern Cape town of Cradock. He attended Rhodes University and received his MA in 1938. After marrying Jean Satchwell in 1940 he left South Africa to fight in the Second World War. After the war, he read English literature at Brasenose College, Oxford University, graduating in 1947.

== Academic career ==
He returned to South Africa, lecturing in English at the University of the Witwatersrand. In 1951, he returned to Rhodes University in Makhanda then known as Grahamstown, to take up a post as senior lecturer, and a year later was made professor and head of English. He remained there until his retirement in 1987, when he was appointed Emeritus Professor and Honorary Research Fellow. He received honorary doctorates from the University of Natal, the University of the Witwatersrand and Rhodes University.

Butler promoted the culture of English-speaking South Africans, which led to the charge of separatism from some critics, although he argued for integration rather than exclusivity. He was influential in achieving the recognition of South African English Literature as an accepted discipline. In his poetry he strove for the synthesis of European and African elements into a single voice.

Butler's childhood is depicted in his autobiography, Karoo Morning (1977). Bursting World (1983) continues with an account of his student years and his experiences during World War II, in North Africa and Italy. Stranger to Europe (1952), his first poetry collection, contains fine war poems. Selected Poems appeared in 1975, updated with additional poems in 1989. Pilgrimage to Dias Cross (1987) is a long meditation on racial conflict, incorporating representative voices from various groups, and ending with a prayer for unity. Butler's plays include Richard Gush of Salem (1982) and Demea (1990). A Local Habitation (1991) continues his autobiography up to 1990.

His sister, Dorothy Eyre Murray (née Butler), was also a poet.

Butler died in Grahamstown in 2001. The main theatre in the 1820 Settlers National Monument in Grahamstown is named in his honour. Guy Butler House, a student residence at Rhodes University is also named after him.

== Works ==
=== Plays ===
- The Dam
- The Dove Returns
- Demea: A Play. New Africa Books. 1990. ISBN 978-0-86486-169-6.
- Richard Gush of Salem. M. Miller. 1982. ISBN 978-0-623-01385-4.
- Take Root Or Die. A. A. Balkema. 1970.
- Cape Charade
- Kaatjie Kekkelbek

=== Poetry ===
- Stranger to Europe
- South of the Zambezi
- Cape Coloured Batman (1945)
- Selected Poems. Ad. Donker. 1989. ISBN 978-0-86852-105-3.
- Songs and Ballads
- Oxford Book of South African Verse (1959)
- Collected Poems. David Philip Publishers. 1999. ISBN 978-0-86486-439-0.

=== Autobiographical books ===
- Karoo Morning: An Autobiography (1918-35). D. Philip. 1981. ISBN 978-0-908396-53-5.
- Bursting World
- A Local Habitation: An Autobiography, 1945-90. New Africa Books. 1991. ISBN 978-0-86486-180-1.

=== Other works ===
- Essays and Lectures, 1949-1991. David Philip. 1994. ISBN 978-0-86486-255-6.
- "English and the English in the New South Africa". English Academy Review. 3 (1): 163–176. 1985. doi:10.1080/10131758585310141. ISSN 1013-1752.
