= List of English-language poets =

This is a list of English-language poets, who have written much of their poetry in English. Main country of residence as a poet (not place of birth): A = Australia, Ag = Antigua, B = Barbados, Bo = Bosnia, C = Canada, Ch = Chile, Cu = Cuba, D = Dominica, De = Denmark, E = England, F = France, G = Germany, Ga = Gambia, Gd = Grenada, Gh = Ghana/Gold Coast, Gr = Greece, Gu = Guyana/British Guiana, Gy = Guernsey, HK = Hong Kong, In = India, IoM = Isle of Man, Is = Israel, Ir = Ireland, It = Italy, J = Jamaica, Je = Jersey, Jp = Japan, K = Kenya, L = Lebanon, M = Malta, Me = Mexico, Mo = Montserrat, Ne = Nepal, Nf = Newfoundland (colony), Ni = Nigeria, NI = Northern Ireland, Nt = Netherlands, NZ = New Zealand, P = Pakistan, Pa = Palestine, Ph = Philippines, PI = Pitcairn Islands, RE = Russian Empire, S = Scotland, SA = South Africa, Se = Serbia, SL = Saint Lucia, SLe = Sierra Leone, SLk = Sri Lanka, So = Somalia, Sw = Sweden, T = Trinidad and Tobago, US = United States/preceding colonies, W = Wales, Z = Zimbabwe/Rhodesia

== A ==
=== Aa–Al ===
- Jonathan Aaron (born 1941, US)
- Chris Abani (born 1966, Ni/US)
- Henry Abbey (1842–1911, US)
- Eleanor Hallowell Abbott (1872–1958, US)
- J. H. M. Abbott (1874–1953, A)
- Lascelles Abercrombie (1881–1938, E)
- Arthur Talmage Abernethy (1872–1956, US)
- Mark Abley (born 1955, C)
- James Aboud (born 1956, T)
- Lionel Abrahams (1928–2004, SA)
- Sam Abrams (1935–2023, US)
- Seth Abramson (born 1976, US)
- Dannie Abse (1923–2014, W)
- Chinua Achebe (1930–2013, Ni/US)
- Catherine Obianuju Acholonu (1951–2014, Ni)
- Kathy Acker (1947–1997, US)
- Diane Ackerman (born 1948, US)
- Duane Ackerson (1942–2020, US)
- Milton Acorn (1923–1986, C)
- Harold Acton (1904–1994, E/It)
- Gilbert Adair (1944–2011, S/F)
- Virginia Hamilton Adair (1919–2004, US)
- Helen Adam (1909–1993, S/US)
- Jean Adam (1704–1765, S)
- Arthur Henry Adams (1872–1936, NZ/A)
- Douglas Adams (1952–2001, E)
- John Adams (1704–1740, US)
- Léonie Adams (1899–1988, US)
- Ryan Adams (born 1974, US)
- Gil Adamson (born 1961, C)
- Robert Adamson (1943–2022, A)
- Fleur Adcock (1934–2024, NZ/E)
- Joseph Addison (1672–1719, E)
- Kim Addonizio (born 1954, US)
- Bayo Adebowale (born 1944, Ni)
- Toyin Adewale-Gabriel (born 1969, Ni)
- Opal Palmer Adisa (born 1954, J)
- Tatamkhulu Afrika (1920–2002, SA)
- John Agard (born 1949, Gu)
- Sandra Agard (living, E)
- Patience Agbabi (born 1965, W/E)
- Deborah Ager born 1978, US)
- Kelli Russell Agodon (living, US)
- Allan Ahlberg (1938–1994, E)
- Ai (1947–2010, US)
- Ama Ata Aidoo (1940–2023, Gh)
- Conrad Aiken (1889–1973, US)
- Douglas Ainslie (1865–1948, S)
- Thomas Aird (1802–1876, S)
- Adam Aitken (born 1960, A)
- Neil Aitken (born 1974, C)
- Funso Aiyejina (1949–2024, Ni)
- Tolu Ajayi (born 1946, Ni)
- Mark Akenside (1721–1770, E)
- Salman Akhtar (born 1946, In/US)
- Tolu Akinyemi (living, Ni)
- Alasdair MacMhaighstir Alasdair (c. 1695–1770, S)
- Jordie Albiston (1961–2022, A)
- Ammiel Alcalay (born 1956, US)
- Amos Bronson Alcott (1799–1888, US)
- Louisa May Alcott (1832–1888, US)
- Kaye Aldenhoven (living, A)
- Richard Aldington (1892–1962, E)
- Elizabeth Alexander (born 1962, US)
- Sidney A. Alexander (1866–1948, E)
- William Alexander, 1st Earl of Stirling (c. 1567–1640, S)
- Sherman Alexie (born 1966, US)
- Felipe Alfau (1902–1999, US)
- Edna Alford (born 1947, C)
- Mike Alfred (living, SA)
- Agha Shahid Ali (1949–2001, In/US)
- James Alexander Allan (1889–1956, A)
- Rob Allan (1945–2021, NZ)
- Sandra Alland (living, C/S)
- Donna Allard (living, C)
- Dick Allen (1939–2017, US)
- Donald Allen (1912–2004, US)
- Elizabeth Allen (living, A)
- Elizabeth Akers Allen (1832–1911, US)
- Leslie Holdsworth Allen (1879–1964, A)
- Lillian Allen (born 1951, C)
- Richard James Allen (born 1960, A)
- Ron Allen (1947–2010, US)
- Ellen Palmer Allerton (1835–1893, US)
- William Allingham (1824/28–1889, Ir/E)
- Washington Allston (1779–1843, US)
- Anne-Marie Alonzo (1951–2005, C)
- Alta (Alta Gerrey, 1942–2024, US)
- Al Alvarez (1929–2019, E)
- Ivy Alvarez (living, A)
- Julia Alvarez (born 1950, D/US)
- Moniza Alvi (born 1954, E)

=== Am–Az ===
- George Amabile (born 1936, C)
- Abdulkareem Baba Aminu (born 1977, Ni)
- Kingsley Amis (1922–1995, E)
- A. R. Ammons (1926–2001, US)
- Madhur Anand (born 1971, C)
- Ingrid Andersen (born 1965, SA)
- Ethel Anderson (1883–1958, A)
- Freddie Anderson (1922–2001, Ir/S)
- J. Redwood Anderson (1883–1964, E)
- Patrick Anderson (1915–1979, E/C)
- Rod Anderson (born 1935, C)
- Victor Henry Anderson (1917–2001, US)
- Michael Andre (born 1946, C/US)
- Bruce Andrews (born 1948, US)
- Kevin Andrews (1924–1989, E/Gr)
- Ron Androla (born 1954, US)
- Ralph Angel (1951–2020, US)
- Maya Angelou (1928–2014, US)
- James Stout Angus (1830–1923, S)
- Marion Angus (1865–1946, S)
- J. K. Annand (1908–1993, S)
- David Antin (1932–2016, US)
- Antler (born 1946, US)
- Susanne Antonetta (born 1956, US)
- Brother Antoninus (1912–1994, US)
- Raymond Antrobus (living, E)
- Philip Appleman (1926–2020, US)
- Richard Appleton (1932–2005, A)
- Alexander Arbuthnot (1538–1583, S)
- Walter Conrad Arensberg (1878–1954, US)
- Rae Armantrout (born 1947, US)
- Simon Armitage (born 1963, E)
- Annie Armitt (1850–1933, E)
- Richard Armour (1906–1989, US)
- Jeannette Armstrong (born 1948, C)
- Peter Armstrong (born 1957, E)
- Tammy Armstrong (born 1974, C)
- David Arnason (born 1940, C)
- Craig Arnold (1967–2009, US)
- Matthew Arnold (1822–1888, E)
- Joanne Arnott (born 1960, C)
- K. O. Arvidson (1938–2011, NZ)
- M. K. Asante (born 1982, US)
- John Ashbery (1927–2017, US)
- Cliff Ashby (1919–2012, E)
- Joseph Ashby-Sterry (1836 or 1838–1917, E)
- Thomas Ashe (1836–1889, E)
- Renée Ashley (born 1949, US)
- Anne Askew (1521–1546, E)
- Timoshenko Aslanides (1943–2020, A)
- Herbert Asquith (1881–1947, E)
- Thea Astley (1925–2004, A)
- Tilly Aston (1873–1947, A)
- Edwin Atherstone (1788–1872, E)
- Cassandra Atherton (living, A)
- Rupert Atkinson (1881–1961, A)
- Tiffany Atkinson (born 1972, W)
- Margaret Atwood (born 1939, C)
- Dorothy Auchterlonie (1915–1991, A)
- John Audelay (died c. 1426, E)
- W. H. Auden (1907–1973, E/US)
- William Auld (1924–2006, S)
- Joseph Auslander (1897–1965, US)
- Paul Auster (1947–2024, US)
- Alfred Austin (1835–1913, E)
- Oana Avasilichioaei (living, C)
- James Avery (1945–2013, US)
- Tusiata Avia (born 1966, NZ)
- Margaret Avison (1918–2007, C)
- Kofi Awoonor (1935–2013, Gh)
- Ayo Ayoola-Amale (born 1970, Ni)
- Pam Ayres (born 1947, E)
- Sir Robert Aytoun (1570–1638, S/E)
- William Edmondstoune Aytoun (1813–1865, S)
- Nnorom Azuonye (1967–2024, Ni)
- Jody Azzouni (born 1954, US)

== B ==
=== Ba ===
- Ken Babstock (born 1970, C)
- Peter Babyon (fl. 1317 – 1366, E)
- Jimmy Santiago Baca (born 1952, US)
- Bellamy Bach (group pseudonym, 1980s, US)
- Joseph M. Bachelor (Joseph Morris, 1889–1947, US)
- Elizabeth Bachinsky (born 1976, C)
- Gabeba Baderoon (born 1969, SA)
- Grace Shattuck Bail (1898–1996, US)
- Alfred Bailey (1905–1997, C)
- Jacob Bailey (1731–1808, US/C)
- Kevin Bailey (born 1954, E)
- Philip James Bailey (1816–1902, E)
- Joanna Baillie (1762–1861, S/E)
- David Baker (born 1954, US)
- Henry Baker (1698–1774, E)
- Marie Annharte Baker (born 1942, C)
- Peter Bakowski (born 1954, A)
- John Balaban (born 1943, US)
- Jesse Ball (born 1978, US)
- Addie L. Ballou (1838–1916, US)
- Samuel Bamford (1788–1872, E)
- John Banim (1798–1842, Ir/E)
- Chris Banks (born 1970, C)
- Russell Banks (1940–2023, US)
- Kaushalya Bannerji (living, C)
- Anne Bannerman (1765–1829, S)
- Frances Bannerman (1855–1944, C)
- Lex Banning (1921–1965, A)
- Ivy Bannister (born 1951, US/Ir)
- Shabbir Banoobhai (born 1949, SA)
- Amiri Baraka (1934–2014, US)
- Anna Laetitia Barbauld (1743–1825, E)
- Mary Barber (c. 1685 – c. 1755, Ir)
- Ros Barber (born 1964, E)
- Anna Laetitia Barbauld (1743–1825, E)
- John Barbour (c. 1320–1395, S)
- Alexander Barclay (1476–1552, S)
- Leland Bardwell (1922–2016, Ir)
- Serie Barford (living, NZ)
- Richard Barham (Thomas Ingoldsby, 1788–1845, E)
- George Barker (1913–1991, E)
- Les Barker (1947–2023, E)
- Coleman Barks (1937–2026, US)
- Clement Barksdale (1609–1687, E)
- Joel Barlow (1754–1812, US/F)
- Lady Anne Barnard (1750–1825, S/SA)
- Mary Barnard (1909–2002, US)
- Djuna Barnes (1892–1982, US)
- Stuart Barnes (born 1977, A)
- William Barnes (1801–1886, E)
- Annie Wall Barnett (1859–1942, US)
- Catherine Barnett (born 1960, US)
- Richard Barnfield (1574–1627, E)
- Willis Barnstone (born 1927, US)
- John Barr (1809–1889, S/NZ)
- Miriam Barr (born 1982, NZ)
- Laird Barron (born 1970, US)
- Bernard Barton (1784–1849, E)
- John Barton (born 1957, C)
- Bertha Hirsch Baruch (later 19th – early 20th century, US)
- Gary Barwin (born 1964, C)
- Todd Bash (born 1965, US)
- Michael Basinski (born 1950, US)
- Shaunt Basmajian (1950–1990, C)
- Ellen Bass (born 1947, US)
- Arlo Bates (1850–1918, US)
- David Bates (1809–1870, US)
- H. E. Bates (1905–1974, E)
- Katharine Lee Bates (1859–1929, US)
- Joseph Bathanti (born 1953, US)
- Dawn-Michelle Baude (born 1959, US)
- Bill Bauer (1932–2010, US/C)
- Edward Baugh (1936–2023, J)
- Charles Baxter (born 1947, US)
- James K. Baxter (1926–1972, NZ)
- Arthur Bayldon (1865–1958, A)
- William Baylebridge (1883–1942, A)

=== Be–Bo ===
- Eric Beach (1947–2024, A)
- Thomas Beach (died 1737, W)
- John Beaglehole (1901–1971, NZ)
- Anne Beale (1816–1900, E/W)
- Doug Beardsley (born 1941, C)
- James Beattie (1735–1803, S)
- Jan Beatty (born 1952, US)
- Derek Beaulieu (born 1973, C)
- Francis Beaumont (1586–1616, E)
- Bruce Beaver (1928–2004, A)
- Samuel Beckett (1906–1989, Ir)
- Joshua Beckman (living, US)
- Thomas Lovell Beddoes (1803–1849, E/G)
- Ruth Bedford (1882–1963, A)
- Jack Bedson (born 1950, A)
- Patricia Beer (1919–1999, E)
- Ven Begamudré (born 1956, C)
- Brendan Behan (1923–1964, Ir)
- Aphra Behn (1640–1689, E)
- Sinclair Beiles (1930–2000, SA)
- Gerard Beirne (born 1962, Ir/C)
- Henry Beissel (1929–2025, G/C)
- Billy-Ray Belcourt (living, C)
- Ken Belford (1946–2020, C)
- Erin Belieu (born 1965, US)
- J. J. Bell (1871–1934, S)
- Julian Bell (1908–1937, E)
- Marvin Bell (1937–2020, US)
- Lisa Bellear (1961–2006, A)
- Lesley Belleau (living, C)
- Hilaire Belloc (1870–1953, E)
- John Bemrose (living, C)
- Gwen Benaway (born 1987, C)
- Hester A. Benedict (1838–1921, US)
- Stephen Vincent Benét (1898–1943, US)
- William Rose Benét (1886–1950, US)
- Elizabeth Benger (1775–1827, E)
- Gwendolyn B. Bennett (1902–1981, US)
- Jim Bennett (born 1951, E)
- Louise Bennett-Coverley (1919–2006, J)
- Robbie Benoit (died 2007, C)
- A. C. Benson (1862–1925, E)
- Richard Berengarten (born 1943, E)
- Bill Berkson (1939–2016, US)
- Charles Bernstein (born 1950, US)
- Robert Berold (born 1948, SA)
- Anselm Berrigan (born 1972, US)
- Daniel Berrigan (1921–2016, US)
- Ted Berrigan (1934–1983, US)
- James Berry (1924–2017, J/E)
- Wendell Berry (born 1934, US)
- John Berryman (1914–1972, US)
- Charles Best (1570–1627, E)
- Mary Matilda Betham (1776–1852, E)
- Matilda Betham-Edwards (1836–1919, E)
- Ursula Bethell (1874–1945, NZ)
- John Betjeman (1906–1984, E)
- Craven Langstroth Betts (1853–1941, C)
- Elizabeth Beverley (fl. 1815–1830, E)
- Judith Beveridge (born 1956, A)
- Helen Bevington (1906–2001, US)
- L. S. Bevington (1845–1895, E)
- Thomas Bibby (1799–1863, Ir)
- Ruth Bidgood (1922–2022, W)
- Lettie S. Bigelow (1849–1906, US)
- Vonani Bila (born 1972, SA)
- Robert Billings (1949–1986, C)
- William Billington (1825–1884, E)
- Margaret Bingham (1740–1814, E)
- Laurence Binyon (1869–1943, E)
- Hera Lindsay Bird (born 1987, NZ)
- Earle Birney (1904–1995, C)
- Dora Birtles (1903–1992, A)
- Elizabeth Bishop (1911–1979, US)
- Morris Bishop (1893–1973, US)
- Samuel Bishop (1731–1795, E)
- Bill Bissett (born 1939, C)
- Sherwin Bitsui (born 1974, US)
- David MacLeod Black (born 1941, S)
- Sophie Cabot Black (born 1958, US)
- Paul Blackburn (1926–1971, US)
- Thomas Blacklock (1721–1791, S)
- Leigh Blackmore (born 1959, A)
- R. P. Blackmur (1904–1965, US)
- Peter Bladen (1922–2001, A)
- Isa Blagden (1816 or 1817–1873, It)
- Max Blagg (born 1948, E/US)
- Mark Blagrave (born 1956, C)
- Robert Blair (1699–1746, S)
- William Blake (1757–1827, E)
- Susanna Blamire (1747–1794, E)
- Paddy Blanchfield (1911–1980, NZ)
- Richard Blanco (born 1968, US)
- Don Blanding (1894–1957, US)
- Robin Blaser (1925–2009, C)
- Ann Eliza Bleecker (1752–1783, US)
- Adrian Blevins (born 1964, US)
- John Blight (1913–1995, A)
- Mathilde Blind (1841–1896, E)
- Laurie Block (1949–2018, C)
- E. D. Blodgett (1935–2018, C)
- Benjamin Paul Blood (1832–1919, US)
- Valerie Bloom (born 1956, J/E)
- Robert Bloomfield (1766–1823, E)
- Elizabeth Blower (c. 1757/63 – post-1816, E)
- Edmund Blunden (1896–1974, E)
- Roy Blumenthal (born 1968, SA)
- Wilfrid Scawen Blunt (1840–1922, E)
- Robert Bly (1926–2021, US)
- Ali Blythe (living, C)
- Barcroft Boake (1866–1892, A)
- Robert Boates (born 1954, C)
- Merlinda Bobis (born 1959, A)
- Louise Bogan (1897–1970, US)
- Michelle Boisseau (1955–2017, US)
- Christian Bök (born 1966, C)
- Osbern Bokenam (c. 1393 – c. 1464, E)
- George Henry Boker (1823–1890, US)
- Eavan Boland (1944–2020, Ir)
- Alan Bold (1943–1998, S)
- Dermot Bolger (born 1959, Ir)
- Stephanie Bolster (born 1969, C)
- Edmund Bolton (c. 1575 – c. 1633)
- Ken Bolton (born 1949, A)
- Roger Bonair-Agard (living, J/US)
- Horatius Bonar (1808–1889, S)
- Elizabeth Bonhôte (1744–1818, E)
- Sean Bonney (1969–2019, E)
- Arna Wendell Bontemps (1902–1973, US)
- Shane Book (living, C)
- Luke Booker (1762–1835, E)
- Kurt Boone (born 1959, US)
- Henry Ernest Boote (1865–1949, A)
- Ivan Bootham (1939–2016, NZ)
- Pat Boran (born 1963, Ir)
- Jenny Bornholdt (born 1960, NZ)
- Roo Borson (born 1952, C)
- Keith Bosley (1937–2018, E)
- Anne Lynch Botta (1815–1891, US)
- Gordon Bottomley (1874–1948, E)
- David Bottoms (1949–2023, US)
- Jenny Boult (MML Bliss, 1951–2005, A)
- Francis William Bourdillon (1852–1921, E)
- Arthur Bourinot (1893–1969, C)
- John Philip Bourke (1860–1914, A)
- Jane Bowdler (1743–1784, E)
- George Bowering (born 1935, C)
- Marilyn Bowering (born 1949, C)
- Cathy Smith Bowers (born 1949, US)
- Edgar Bowers (1924–2000, US)
- Tim Bowling (born 1964, C)
- Alex Boyd (born 1969, C)
- Louise Esther Vickroy Boyd (1827–1909, US)
- Mark Alexander Boyd (1563–1601, S)
- Kay Boyle (1902–1992, US)
- Peter Boyle (born 1951, A)
- Samuel Boyse (1702/1703–1749, Ir/E)
- Virginia Frazer Boyle (1863–1938, US)

=== Br–By ===
- Francis Brabazon (1907–1984, A)
- Thomas Bracken (1843–1898, NZ)
- Alison Brackenbury (born 1953, E)
- Anna Braden (1858–1939, US)
- James Bradley (born 1967, A)
- Anne Bradstreet (c. 1612–1672, US)
- Robert Bradstreet (1766–1836, E)
- E. J. Brady (1869–1952, A)
- Kate Braid (born 1947, C)
- Lawrence Ytzhak Braithwaite (1963–2008, C)
- Shannon Bramer (born 1973, C)
- Bertha Southey Brammall (1878–1957, A)
- James Bramston (c. 1694–1743, E)
- Dionne Brand (born 1953, C)
- Di Brandt (born 1952, C)
- Charles Brasch (1909–1973, NZ)
- Giannina Braschi (born 1953, US)
- Kamau Brathwaite (1930–2020, B)
- Richard Brautigan (1935–1984, US)
- John Jefferson Bray (1912–1995, A)
- Diana Brebner (1956–2001, C)
- Jean "Binta" Breeze (1956–2021, J)
- Christopher Brennan (1870–1932, A)
- Joseph Payne Brennan (1918–1990, US)
- Michael Brennan (born 1973, A)
- Jane Brereton (1685–1740, W)
- John Le Gay Brereton (1871–1933, A)
- Nicholas Breton (1542–1626, E)
- Brian Brett (1950–2024, C)
- Lily Brett (born 1946, A)
- Ken Brewer (1941–2006, US)
- Elizabeth Brewster (1922–2012, C)
- Martha Wadsworth Brewster (1710 – c. 1757, US)
- Breyten Breytenbach (1939–2024, SA)
- Diana Bridge (born 1942, NZ)
- Robert Bridges (1844–1930, E)
- Kim Bridgford (1959–2000, US)
- Robert Bringhurst (born 1946, C)
- Geoffrey Brock (born 1964, US)
- Eve Brodlique (1867–1949, UK/C/US)
- Alexander Brome (1620–1666, E)
- David Bromige (1933–2009, C/US)
- William Bronk (1918–1999, US)
- Anne Brontë (1820–1849, E)
- Branwell Brontë (1817–1848, E)
- Charlotte Brontë (1816–1855, E)
- Emily Brontë (1818–1848, E)
- Rupert Brooke (1887–1915, E)
- David Brooks (born 1953, A)
- Gwendolyn Brooks (1917–2000, US)
- Alice Williams Brotherton (1848–1930, US)
- Audrey Alexandra Brown (1904–1998, C)
- George Mackay Brown (1921–1996, S)
- James Brown (J. B. Selkirk, 1832–1904, S)
- Jericho Brown (born 1976, US)
- Pam Brown (born 1948, A)
- Sterling Allen Brown (1901–1989, US)
- Stewart Brown (born 1951, E)
- Thomas Edward Brown (1830–1897, IoM)
- Wayne Brown (1944–2009, T)
- Frances Browne (1816–1879, Ir)
- Isaac Hawkins Browne (1705–1760, E)
- Moses Browne (1704–1787, E)
- Sir Thomas Browne (1605–1682, E)
- William Browne (1588–1643, E)
- Elizabeth Barrett Browning (1806–1861, E/It)
- Robert Browning (1812–1889, E/It)
- Charles Tory Bruce (1906–1971, C)
- Mary Grant Bruce (1878–1958, A)
- Julie Bruck (living, C)
- Dennis Brutus (1924–2009, SA)
- William Cullen Bryant (1794–1878, US)
- Colette Bryce (born 1970, NI/E)
- Bryher (Annie Winifred Ellerman, 1894–1983, E)
- Dugald Buchanan (1716–1768, S)
- George Buchanan (1506–1582, S)
- Robert Williams Buchanan (1841–1901, S)
- Vincent Buckley (1925–1988, A)
- Charles Buckmaster (1950–1972, A)
- David Budbill (1940–2016, US)
- Andrea Hollander Budy (born 1947, US)
- Suzanne Buffam (living, C)
- Charles Bukowski (1920–1994, US)
- April Bulmer (born 1963, C)
- Rhoda Bulter (1929–1994, S)
- Basil Bunting (1900–1985, E)
- Anthony Burgess (1917–1993, E)
- Haldane Burgess (1862–1927, S)
- Andrew Burke (1944–2023, A)
- Murdoch Burnett (1953–2015, C)
- Joanne Burns (born 1945, A)
- Robert Burns (1759–1796, S)
- Stanley Burnshaw (1906–2005, US)
- John Burnside (1955–2024, S)
- Sophia Burrell (1753–1802, E)
- William S. Burroughs (1914–1997, US)
- Mick Burrs (1940–2021, C)
- Duncan Bush (1946–2017, W/E)
- Olivia Ward Bush-Banks (1869–1944, US)
- Aaron Bushkowsky (born 1957, C)
- Guy Butler (1918–2001, SA)
- Samuel Butler (1612–1680, E)
- Ray Buttigieg (born 1955, M)
- Anthony Butts (born 1969, US)
- A. S. Byatt (1936–2023, E)
- Kathryn Stripling Byer (1944–2017, US)
- Witter Bynner (Emanuel Morgan, 1881–1968, US)
- Lord Byron (1788–1824, E/It)

== C ==
=== Ca–Ci ===
- Richard Caddel (1949–2003, E)
- Caroline Caddy (born 1944, A)
- Charmaine Cadeau (living, C)
- Adrian Caesar (born 1955, A)
- Stephen Cain (born 1970, C)
- Scott Cairns (born 1954, US)
- Alison Calder (born 1969, C)
- Angus Calder (1942–2008, S)
- Alex Caldiero (born 1949, US)
- Frank Oliver Call (1878–1956, C)
- Barry Callaghan (born 1937, C)
- Michael Feeney Callan (living, Ir)
- Charles Stuart Calverley (1831–1884, E)
- Robert Calvert (1945–1988, E)
- Anne Cameron (Cam Hubert, 1938–2022, C)
- Norman Cameron (1905–1953, S)
- Jason Camlot (born 1967, C)
- A. Y. Campbell (1885–1958, S)
- Alistair Campbell (1925–2009, NZ)
- Angus Peter Campbell (born 1954, S)
- David Campbell (1915–1979, A)
- Elizabeth Campbell (born 1980, A)
- Elizabeth Duncan Campbell (1804–1878, S)
- Joseph Campbell (1879–1944, Ir)
- Meg Campbell (1937–2007, NZ)
- Paul-Henri Campbell (born 1982, US)
- Roy Campbell (1901–1957, SA)
- Thomas Campbell (1774–1844, S/E)
- William Wilfred Campbell (1860–1918, C)
- Thomas Campion (1567–1620, E)
- Melville Henry Cane (1879–1980, US)
- Mary Wedderburn Cannan (1893–1973, E)
- Moya Cannon (born 1956, Ir)
- Edward Capern (1819–1894, E)
- Vahni Capildeo (born 1973, T/S)
- Natalee Caple (born 1970, C)
- Thomas Carew (1595–1639, E)
- Henry Carey (1693–1743, E)
- Robert Carliell (died c. 1622, E)
- Bliss Carman (1861–1929, C/US)
- Clyde Carr (1886–1962, NZ)
- Fern G. Z. Carr (born 1956, C)
- Jim Carroll (1949–2009, US)
- Lewis Carroll (1832–1898, E)
- Hayden Carruth (1921–2008, US)
- A.J. Carruthers (living, A)
- Ann Elizabeth Carson (1929–2023, C)
- Anne Carson (born 1950, C)
- Ciaran Carson (1948–2019, NI)
- Elizabeth Carter (1717–1806, E)
- Jared Carter (born 1939, US)
- William Cartwright (1611–1643, E)
- Raymond Carver (1938–1988, US)
- Alice Cary (1820–1871, US)
- Phoebe Cary (1824–1871, US)
- Marietta Stanley Case (1845–1900, US)
- James Casey (1824–1909, Ir)
- Juanita Casey (1925–2012, E)
- Neal Cassady (1926–1968, US)
- Cyrus Cassells (born 1957, US)
- Ana Castillo (born 1953, US)
- Lee Cataldi (born 1942, A)
- Nancy Cato (1917–2000, A)
- Charles Causley (1917–2003, E)
- Nick Cave (born 1957, A)
- George Cavendish (1494 – c. 1562, E)
- Margaret Cavendish, Duchess of Newcastle-upon-Tyne (1623–1673, E)
- Kate Cayley (living, C)
- Susanna Centlivre (c. 1667/1670 – 1723, E)
- Thomas Centolella (living, US)
- Joseph Ceravolo (1934–1988, US)
- John Chalkhill (fl. 1600, E)
- Gordon Challis (1932–2018, NZ)
- Weyman Chan (born 1963, C)
- Catherine Chandler (born 1950, C)
- Elizabeth Margaret Chandler (1807–1834, US)
- Diana Chang (1924–2009, US)
- William Ellery Channing (1818–1901, US)
- Arthur Chapman (1873–1935, US)
- George Chapman (1560–1634, E)
- Patrick Chapman (born 1968, Ir)
- Fred Chappell (1936–2024, US)
- Craig Charles (born 1964, E)
- James Charlton (born 1947, A)
- Barbara Chase-Riboud (born 1939, US)
- Thomas Chatterton (1752–1770, E)
- Geoffrey Chaucer (c. 1343–1400, E)
- Angelico Chavez (1910–1996, US)
- Syl Cheney-Coker (born 1945, SLe)
- Maxine Chernoff (born 1952, US)
- Kelly Cherry (1940–2022, US)
- G. K. Chesterton (1874–1936, E)
- Thomas Chestre (late 14th c., E)
- James Wm. Chichetto (born 1941, US)
- Lydia Maria Child (1802–1880, US)
- Harriet L. Childe-Pemberton (1852–1922, E)
- Billy Childish (born 1959, E)
- Marilyn Chin (born 1955, US)
- Staceyann Chin (born 1972, J)
- Eileen Chong (born 1980, A)
- Robert Choquette (1905–1991, C)
- Lesley Choyce (born 1951, C)
- Margaret Christakos (born 1962, C)
- Evie Christie (living, C)
- Ralph Chubb (1892–1960, E)
- Mary Chudleigh (1656–1710, E)
- Hubert Newman Wigmore Church (1857–1932, A)
- Richard Church (1893–1972, E)
- Charles Churchill (1731–1764, E)
- John Ciardi (1916–1986, US)
- Colley Cibber (1671–1757, E)
- Charl Cilliers (born 1941, SA)
- Sandra Cisneros (born 1954, US)
- Carson Cistulli (born 1979, US)

=== Cl ===
- Amy Clampitt (1920–1994, US
- Kate Clanchy (born 1965, S)
- John Clanvowe (c. 1341–1391, W/E)
- John Clare (1793–1864, E)
- Dave Clark (living, C)
- Douglas Clark (1942–2010, E)
- Elizabeth Clark (1918–1978, S)
- Emily Clark (fl. 1798–1833, E)
- Ross Clark (born 1953, A)
- Tom Clark (1941–2018, US)
- Thomas Clark (born 1980, S)
- Amy Key Clarke (1892–1980, E)
- Austin Clarke (1886–1974, Ir)
- George Elliott Clarke (born 1960, C)
- Gillian Clarke (born 1937, W)
- Jack Clarke (1933–1992, US)
- Marcus Clarke (1846–1881, A)
- Brian P. Cleary (born 1959, US)
- Brendan Cleary (born 1958, NI)
- William Cleland (1661–1689, S)
- Justin Clemens (born 1969, A)
- Benjamin Clementine (born 1988, E/F)
- Jack Clemo (1916–1994, E)
- John Cleveland (1613–1658, E)
- Michelle Cliff (1946–2016, J/US)
- Wayne Clifford (1944–2025, C)
- Lucille Clifton (1936–2010, US)
- Caroline Clive (1801–1873, E)
- Arthur Hugh Clough (1819–1861, E)

=== Co–Cu ===
- Grace Stone Coates (1881–1976, US)
- Florence Earle Coates (1850–1927, US)
- Bob Cobbing (1920–2002, E)
- Ellen Melicent Cobden (1848–1914, E)
- Robbie Coburn (born 1994, A)
- Alison Cockburn (awa Alison Rutherford, 1712–1794, S)
- Alice Rollit Coe (1858–1940, US)
- Judith Ortiz Cofer (1952–2016, US)
- Brian Coffey (1905–1995, Ir/F)
- Fred Cogswell (1917–2004, C)
- Leonard Cohen (1934–2016, C)
- Matt Cohen (1942–1999, C)
- Allison Hedge Coke (born 1958, US)
- Norma Cole (born 1945, C/US)
- Hal Gibson Pateshall Colebatch (1945–2019, A)
- Aidan Coleman (born 1976, A)
- Victor Coleman (born 1944, C)
- Wanda Coleman (1946–2013, US)
- Hartley Coleridge (1796–1849, E)
- Mary Elizabeth Coleridge (1861–1907, E)
- Samuel Taylor Coleridge (1772–1834, E)
- Don Coles (1927–2017, C)
- Katharine Coles (born 1959, US)
- Edward Coletti (living, US)
- Mary Collier (c. 1688–1762, E)
- Billy Collins (born 1941, US)
- John Collins (1742–1808, E)
- William Collins (1721–1759, E)
- Laurence Collinson (1925–1986, A)
- Stephen Collis (living, C)
- John Robert Colombo (born 1936, C)
- Glenn Colquhoun (born 1964, NZ)
- Padraic Colum (1881–1972, Ir/US)
- Anna Olcott Commelin (1841–1924, US)
- Anne Compton (born 1947, C)
- Wayde Compton (born 1972, C)
- Helen Gray Cone (1859–1934, US)
- William Congreve (1670–1729, E)
- Jan Conn (born 1952, C/US)
- Stewart Conn (born 1936, S)
- Paul Conneally (born 1959, E)
- Karen Connelly (born 1969, C)
- Kevin Connolly (born 1962, C)
- Susan Connolly (born 1956, Ir)
- Robert Conquest (1917–2015, E)
- Tony Conran (1931–2013, W)
- Henry Constable (1562–1613, E/F)
- David Constantine (born 1944, E)
- Eliza Cook (1818–1889, E)
- Elizabeth Cook-Lynn (1930–2023, US)
- Sophie Cooke (born 1976, S)
- Ina Coolbrith (1841–1928, US)
- Dennis Cooley (born 1944, C)
- Clark Coolidge (born 1939, US)
- Afua Cooper (born 1957, J/C)
- Thomas Cooper (1805–1892, E)
- John Cooper Clarke (born 1949, E)
- Jack Cope (1913–1991, SA)
- Wendy Cope (born 1945, E)
- Judith Copithorne (1939–2025, C)
- Robert Copland (fl. 1508–1547, E)
- A. E. Coppard (1878–1957, E)
- Julia Copus (born 1969, E)
- Richard Corbet (1582–1635, E)
- Cid Corman (1924–2004, US)
- Alfred Corn (born 1943, US)
- Adam Cornford (born 1950, E)
- Frances Cornford (1886–1960, E)
- Francis M. Cornford (1874–1943, E)
- John Cornford (1915–1936, E)
- Joe Corrie (1894–1968, S)
- Gregory Corso (1930–2001, US)
- Jayne Cortez (1936–2012, US)
- William Johnson Cory (1823–1892, E)
- Louisa Stuart Costello (1799–1877, Ir/F)
- Charles Cotton (1630–1687, E)
- Anna Couani (born 1948, A)
- Anne Ross Cousin (1824–1906, E/S)
- Dani Couture (born 1978, C)
- Thomas Cowherd (1817–1907, C)
- Abraham Cowley (1618–1667, E)
- Hannah Cowley (1743–1809, E)
- Malcolm Cowley (1898–1989, US)
- Dorothy Cowlin (1911–2010, E)
- William Cowper (1731–1800, E)
- George Crabbe (1754–1832, E)
- Christine Craig (born 1943, J)
- Helen Craik (c. 1751–1825, S/E)
- Hart Crane (1899–1932, US)
- Stephen Crane (1871–1900, US)
- Richard Crashaw (1613–1649, E)
- Isabella Valancy Crawford (1846–1887, C)
- Robert Crawford (1868–1930, A)
- Robert Crawford (born 1959, S)
- Richard Crawley (1840–1893, W/E)
- Morri Creech (born 1970, US)
- Robert Creeley (1926–2006, US)
- Caroline de Crespigny (1797–1861, E/G)
- Walter D'Arcy Cresswell (1896–1960, NZ)
- Louise Crisp (born 1957, A)
- Ann Batten Cristall (1769–1848, E)
- Andy Croft (born 1956, E)
- Julian Croft (born 1941, A)
- Alison Croggon (born 1962, A)
- Jeremy Cronin (born 1949, SA)
- M. T. C. Cronin (born 1963, A)
- Lynn Crosbie (born 1963, C)
- Camilla Dufour Crosland (1812–1895, E)
- Zora Cross (1890–1964, A)
- Aleister Crowley (1875–1947, E)
- Andrew Crozier (1943–2008, E)
- Lorna Crozier (Lorna Uher, born 1948, C)
- Helen Cruickshank (1886–1975, S)
- Michael Crummey (born 1965, C)
- Julie Crysler (living, C)
- Anne Virginia Culbertson (1857–1918, US)
- Catherine Ann Cullen (living, Ir)
- Countee Cullen (1903–1946, US)
- Nancy Jo Cullen (living, C)
- Patrick Cullinan (1932–2011, SA)
- E. E. Cummings (1894–1962, US)
- Gary Cummiskey (born 1963, SA)
- Allan Cunningham (1784–1842, S/E)
- J. V. Cunningham (1911–1985, US)
- John Cunningham (1729–1773, Ir/E)
- Allen Curnow (1911–2001, NZ)
- Margaret Curran (1887–1962, A)
- Jen Currin (living, US/C)
- Tony Curtis (born 1946, W)
- Tony Curtis (born 1955, Ir)
- James Cuthbertson (1851–1910, A)
- Ivor Cutler (1923–2006, S)
- Lidija Cvetkovic (born 1967, A)
- Kayla Czaga (born 1989, C)

== D ==
=== Da–Do ===
- H.D. (Hilda Doolittle, 1886–1961, US)
- Cyril Dabydeen (living, Gu/C)
- David Dabydeen (born 1955, Gu)
- Kalli Dakos (living, C)
- Victor Daley (1858–1905, A)
- Mary Dalton (born 1950, C)
- Pádraig J. Daly (born 1943, Ir)
- Raymond Garfield Dandridge (1882/1883–1930, US)
- Joseph A. Dandurand (living, C)
- Achmat Dangor (born 1948, SA)
- Samuel Daniel (1562–1619, E)
- David Daniels (1933–2008, US)
- Jeffrey Daniels (living, US)
- George Darley (1795–1846, Ir)
- Tina Darragh (born 1950, US)
- Keki N. Daruwalla (born 1937, In)
- Erasmus Darwin (1731–1802, E)
- Elizabeth Daryush (1887–1977, E)
- Robert von Dassanowsky (Robert Dassanowsky) (born 1965, US)
- Beverley Daurio (born 1953, C)
- William Davenant (1606–1668, E)
- Guy Davenport (1927–2005, US)
- Frank Davey (born 1940, C)
- Donald Davidson (1893–1968, US)
- John Davidson (1857–1909, S/E)
- Lucretia Maria Davidson (1808–1825, US)
- Michael Davidson (born 1944, US)
- Donald Davie (1922–1995, E)
- Alan Davies (born 1951, US)
- Deborah Kay Davies (living, W)
- Hugh Sykes Davies (1909–1984, E)
- Idris Davies (1905–1953, W)
- John Davies (1569–1626, E)
- W. H. Davies (1871–1940, W)
- Nicholas Flood Davin (1840–1901, C)
- Olive Dehn (1914–2007, E)
- Beatrice Deloitte Davis (1909–1992, A)
- Jon Davis (living, US)
- Norma Davis (1905–1945, A)
- Tanya Davis (living, C)
- Thomas Osborne Davis (1814–1845, Ir)
- Edward Davison (1898–1970, S/US)
- Peter Davison (1928–2004, US)
- Bruce Dawe (1930–2020, A)
- Kwame Dawes (born 1962, US)
- Tom Dawe (born 1940, C)
- Jeffery Day (1896–1918, E)
- Sarah Day (born 1958, A)
- Cecil Day-Lewis (1904–1972, E)
- Elizabeth Dayton (1848-1924, US)
- Adriana de Barros (born 1976, C)
- Somerset de Chair (1911–1995, E)
- Jean Louis De Esque (1879–1956, US)
- Madeline DeFrees (1919–2015, US)
- Celia de Fréine (born 1948, Ir)
- Ingrid de Kok (born 1951, SA)
- Walter de la Mare (1873–1956, E)
- Christine De Luca (born 1947, S)
- Sadiqa de Meijer (born 1977, C)
- Edward de Vere, 17th Earl of Oxford (1550–1604, E)
- Phillippa Yaa de Villiers (born 1966, SA)
- James Deahl (born 1945, C)
- Dulcie Deamer (1890–1972, A)
- John F. Deane (born 1943, Ir)
- Joel Deane (born 1969, A)
- Patrick Deeley (born 1953, Ir)
- Madeline DeFrees (1919–2015, US)
- Thomas Dekker (1575–1641, E)
- Greg Delanty (born 1958, Ir/US)
- Kris Demeanor (living, C)
- Barry Dempster (born 1952, C)
- Joe Denham (living, C)
- John Denham (1615–1669, E)
- C. J. Dennis (1876–1938, A)
- John Dennison (born 1978, NZ)
- Tory Dent (1958–2005, US)
- Enid Derham (1882–1941, A)
- Thomas Dermody (1775–1802, Ir)
- Toi Derricotte (born 1941, US)
- Heather Derr-Smith (born 1971, US)
- Michelle Desbarats (living, C)
- Babette Deutsch (1895–1982, US)
- James Devaney (1890–1976, A)
- Mary Deverell (1731–1805, E)
- Denis Devlin (1908–1959, Ir)
- George E. Dewar (1895–1969, NZ)
- Christopher Dewdney (born 1951, C]
- Imtiaz Dharker (born 1954, P/W)
- Pier Giorgio Di Cicco (1949–2019, C)
- Mary di Michele (born 1949, C)
- Diane di Prima (1934–2020, US)
- Ann Diamond (living, C)
- Natalie Diaz (born 1978, US)
- Anne Dick (died 1741, S)
- Jennifer K Dick (born 1970, US)
- James Dickey (1923–1997, US)
- Adam Dickinson (living, C)
- Emily Dickinson (1830–1886, US)
- Matthew Dickman (born 1975, US)
- Michael Dickman (born 1975, US)
- Robert Dickson (1944–2007, C)
- Peter Didsbury (born 1946, E)
- Modikwe Dikobe (1913–?, SA)
- Des Dillon (living, S)
- John Dillon (1851–1927, Ir)
- B. R. Dionysius (born 1969, A)
- Ray DiPalma (1943–2016, US)
- Thomas M. Disch (born 1940, US)
- Chitra Banerjee Divakaruni (born 1956, In/US)
- Isobel Dixon (born 1969, SA/E)
- Sarah Dixon (1671–1765, E)
- William Hepworth Dixon (1821–1879, E)
- Angifi Dladla (born 1950, SA)
- Tim Dlugos (1950–1990, US)
- Kildare Dobbs (1923–2013, C)
- Henry Austin Dobson (1840–1921, E)
- Rosemary Dobson (1920–2012, A)
- Stephen Dobyns (born 1941, US)
- Jeramy Dodds (born 1974, C)
- Robert Dodsley (1703–1764, E)
- Pete Doherty (born 1979, E)
- Digby Mackworth Dolben (1848–1867, E)
- Joe Dolce (born 1947, US/A)
- Don Domanski (born 1950, C)
- Magie Dominic (born 1944, C)
- Jeffery Donaldson (living, C)
- John Donaldson (Jon Inglis, 1921–1989, E)
- John Donne (1572–1631, E)
- David Donnell (born 1939, C)
- Timothy Donnelly (born 1969, US)
- Gerard Donovan (born 1959, Ir/E)
- Theo Dorgan (born 1953, Ir)
- Ed Dorn (1929–1999, US)
- Catherine Ann Dorset (1752–1834, E)
- Candas Jane Dorsey (born 1952, C)
- Mark Doty (born 1953, US)
- Clive Doucet (born 1946, C)
- Sarah Doudney (1841–1926, E)
- Lucy Dougan (born 1966, A)
- Charles Montagu Doughty (1843–1926, E)
- Lord Alfred Douglas (1870–1945, E)
- Alice May Douglas (1865–1943, US)
- Gavin Douglas (c. 1474–1522, S)
- George Brisbane Scott Douglas (1856–1935, S)
- Keith Douglas (1920–1944, E)
- Orville Lloyd Douglas (born 1976, C)
- Rita Dove (born 1952, US)
- Basil Dowling (1910–2000, NZ)
- Finuala Dowling (born 1962, SA)
- Gordon Downie (1964–2017, C)
- Ellen Mary Patrick Downing (1828–1869, Ir)
- Ernest Dowson (1867–1900, E)
- Francis Hastings Doyle (1810–1888, E)
- Kirby Doyle (1932–2003, US)

=== Dr–Dy ===
- Michael Dransfield (1948–1973, A)
- Jane Draycott (born 1954, E)
- Michael Drayton (1563–1631, E)
- John Swanwick Drennan (1809–1893, Ir)
- William Drennan (1754–1820, Ir)
- Adam Drinan (also Joseph Macleod, 1903–1984, E)
- John Drinkwater (1882–1937, E)
- William Drummond of Hawthornden (1585–1649, S)
- William Henry Drummond (1854–1907, C)
- John Dryden (1631–1700, E)
- W. E. B. Du Bois (1868–1963, US)
- I. D. du Plessis (1900–1981, SA)
- Klara du Plessis (living, SA/C)
- Norman Dubie (born 1945, US)
- Stephen Duck (c. 1705–1756, E)
- Louis Dudek (1918–2001, S)
- Carol Ann Duffy (born 1955, S)
- Charles Gavan Duffy (1816–1903, Ir/A)
- Maureen Duffy (1933–2026, E)
- Alan Dugan (1923–2003, J/US)
- Michael Dugan (1947–2006, A)
- Sasha Dugdale (born 1974, E)
- Eileen Duggan (1894–1972, NZ)
- Laurie Duggan (born 1949, A)
- Jas H. Duke (1939–1992, A)
- Richard Duke (1658–1711, E)
- Tug Dumbly (Geoff Forrester, living, A)
- Marilyn Dumont (born 1955, C)
- Paul Laurence Dunbar (1872–1906, US)
- Robert Nugent Dunbar (1798–1866, Ag)
- William Dunbar (1459/1460 – c. 1530, S)
- Andrew Duncan (born 1956, E)
- Robert Duncan (1919–1988, US)
- Camille Dungy (born 1972, US)
- Helen Dunmore (1952–2017, E)
- Douglas Dunn (born 1942, S)
- Max Dunn (died 1963, A)
- Stephen Dunn (1939–2021, US)
- Joe Dunthorne (born 1982, W)
- Paul Durcan (1944–2025, Ir)
- Lawrence Durrell (1912–1990, E)
- Anne Dutton (1692–1765, E)
- Geoffrey Dutton (1922–1998, A)
- Stuart Dybek (born 1942, US)
- Edward Dyer (1543–1607, E)
- John Dyer (1699–1758, W)
- Bob Dylan (born 1941, US)
- Edward Dyson (1865–1931, A)

== E ==
- Joan Adeney Easdale (1913–1998, E)
- Evelyn Eaton (1902–1983, C)
- Richard Eberhart (1904–2005, US)
- Emily Eden (1797–1869, E)
- Helen Parry Eden (1885–1960, E)
- Stephen Edgar (born 1951, A)
- Lauris Edmond (1924–2000, NZ)
- Russell Edson (1928–2014, US)
- Richard Edwardes (c. 1523–1566, E)
- Dic Edwards (born 1953, W)
- Jonathan Edwards (born 1979, W)
- Rhian Edwards (living, W/E)
- Helen Merrill Egerton (1866–1951, C)
- Terry Ehret (born 1955, US)
- Vic Elias (1948–2006, US/C)
- Anne Elder (1918–1976, A)
- George Eliot (Mary Anne Evans, 1819–1880, E)
- T. S. Eliot (1888–1965, US/E)
- Elizabeth F. Ellet (1818–1877, US)
- Charlotte Elliot (1839–1880, S)
- David Elliott (1923–1999, C)
- Julia Anne Elliott (1809–1841, E)
- Jean Elliot (1727–1805, S)
- Ebenezer Elliott (1781–1849, E)
- George Ellis (1753–1815, E)
- Royston Ellis (born 1941, E)
- Chris Else (born 1942, NZ)
- Rebecca Elson (1960–1999, C)
- Crispin Elsted (living, C)
- Edmund Elviden (fl. 1570, E)
- Claudia Emerson (1957–2014, US)
- Ralph Waldo Emerson (1803–1882, US)
- Chris Emery (born 1963, E)
- William Empson (1906–1984, E)
- Paul Engle (1908–1991, US)
- John Ennis (born 1944, Ir)
- Karen Enns (living, C)
- D. J. Enright (1920–2002, E)
- Riemke Ensing (born 1939, NZ)
- Theodore Enslin (1925–2011, US)
- Louise Erdrich (born 1954, US)
- Ralph Erskine (1685–1752, S)
- Clayton Eshleman (1935–2021, US)
- Martín Espada (born 1957, US)
- Rhina Espaillat (born 1932, US)
- Ramabai Espinet (born 1948, T)
- Jill Alexander Essbaum (born 1971, US)
- Maggie Estep (1963–2014, US)
- Michael Estok (1939–1989, C)
- Jerry Estrin (1947–1993, US)
- George Etherege (1635–1691, E)
- Anne Evans (1820–1870, E)
- Christine Evans (born 1943, E/W)
- George Essex Evans (1863–1909, A)
- Margiad Evans (Peggy Whistler, 1909–1958, E)
- Mari Evans (1919–2017, US)
- Sebastian Evans (1830–1909, E)
- William Everson (Brother Antoninus, 1912–1994, US)
- Gavin Ewart (1916–1995, E)
- John K. Ewers (1904–1978, A)
- Elisabeth Eybers (1915–2007, SA/Nt)

== F ==
- Frederick William Faber (1814–1863, E)
- Diane Fahey (born 1945, A)
- Ruth Fainlight (born 1931, US/E)
- Kingsley Fairbridge (1885–1924, SA)
- A. R. D. Fairburn (1904–1957, NZ)
- Maria and Harriet Falconar (born c. 1771–1774, E or S)
- William Falconer (1732–1769, S)
- Padraic Fallon (1905–1974, Ir)
- Catherine Maria Fanshawe (1765–1834, E)
- U. A. Fanthorpe (1929–1909, E)
- Patricia Fargnoli (born 1937, US)
- Eleanor Farjeon (1881–1965, E)
- Fiona Farrell (born 1947, NZ)
- John Farrell (1851–1904, A)
- John Farrell (1968–2010, US)
- Michael Farrell (born 1965, A)
- Katie Farris (born 1983, US)
- Margaretta Faugères (1771–1801, US)
- Jessie Redmon Fauset (1882–1961, US)
- Brian Fawcett (1944–2022, C)
- Elaine Feeney (living, Ir)
- Elaine Feinstein (1930–2019, E)
- Alison Fell (born 1944, S)
- Charles Fenerty (c. 1821–1892, C)
- Elijah Fenton (1683–1730, E)
- James Fenton (1931–2021, NI)
- James Fenton (born 1949, E)
- Richard Fenton (1747–1821, W)
- Gus Ferguson (1940–2020, SA)
- Samuel Ferguson (1810–1886, Ir)
- Robert Fergusson (1750–1774, S)
- Lawrence Ferlinghetti (1919–2021, US)
- Ferron (Deborah Foisy, born 1952, C)
- George Fetherling (born 1949, C)
- Michael Field (Katherine Bradley, 1846–1914, and Edith Cooper, 1862–1913, E)
- Henry Fielding (1707–1754, E)
- Connie Fife (1961–2017, C)
- Anne Finch, Countess of Winchilsea (1661–1720, E)
- Annie Finch (born 1956, US)
- Peter Finch (living, W)
- Robert Finch (1900–1995, C)
- Ian Hamilton Finlay (1925–2006, S)
- Joan Finnigan (1925–2007, C)
- Jon Paul Fiorentino (living, C)
- Catherine Fisher (born 1957, W)
- Roy Fisher (1930–2017, E)
- Edward FitzGerald (1809–1883, E)
- Judith Fitzgerald (1952–2015, C)
- R. D. Fitzgerald (1902–1987, A)
- Robert Fitzgerald (1910–1985, US)
- Richard FitzPatrick (1748–1813, Ir/E)
- Roderick Flanagan (1828–1862, A)
- James Elroy Flecker (1884–1915, E)
- Marjorie Fleming (1803–1811, S)
- Giles Fletcher (c. 1586–1623, E)
- Giles Fletcher, the Elder (c. 1548–1611, E)
- John Fletcher (1579–1625, E)
- John Gould Fletcher (1886–1950, US)
- Lisa Anne Fletcher (1844–1905, US)
- Phineas Fletcher (1582–1650, E)
- Robert Fletcher (fl. 1586, E)
- Maria De Fleury (c. 1754 – c. 1794, E)
- F. S. Flint (1885–1960, E)
- Alice Flowerdew (1759–1830, E)
- Lionel Fogarty (born 1958, A)
- Jack Foley (born 1940, US)
- Mary Hannay Foott (1846–1918, A)
- John Forbes (1950–1998, A)
- Carolyn Forché (born 1950, US)
- Ford Madox Ford (1873–1939, E)
- John Ford (1586–1639, E)
- John M. Ford (1957–2006, US)
- Robert Ford (1915–1998, C)
- Mabel Forrest (1872–1935, A)
- William Forrest (fl. 1581, E)
- Veronica Forrest-Thomson (1947–1975, S)
- Gary Jeshel Forrester (born 1946, NZ)
- William Forster (1818–1882, A)
- John Foulcher (born 1952, A)
- Ellen Thorneycroft Fowler (1860–1920, E)
- William Fowler (c. 1560–1612, S)
- Kate Fox (born 1975, E)
- Len Fox (1905–2004, A)
- Janet Frame (1924–2004, NZ)
- Ruth France (1913–1968, NZ)
- Matthew Francis (born 1956, E/W)
- Robert Francis (1901–1987, US)
- George Sutherland Fraser (1915–1980, S)
- Gregory Fraser (living, US)
- Raymond Fraser (1941–2018, C)
- Benjamin Frater (1979–2007, A)
- Brentley Frazer (born 1972, A)
- Grace Beacham Freeman (1916–2002, US)
- John Freeman (1880–1929, E)
- Nicholas Freeston (1907–1978, E)
- Patrick Friesen (born 1946, C)
- Anthony Freston (1757–1819, E)
- Robert Frost (1874–1963, US)
- Gwen Frostic (1906–2001, US)
- Gene Frumkin (1928–2007, US)
- Mark Frutkin (born 1948, US/C)
- Sheila Meiring Fugard (born 1932, SA)
- Ethel Romig Fuller (1883–1965, US)
- John Fuller (born 1937, E)
- Roy Fuller (1912–1991, E)
- Mary Eliza Fullerton (1868–1946, A)
- Alice Fulton (born 1952, US)
- Robin Fulton (born 1937, S)
- Ulpian Fulwell (1545/1546 – before 1586, E)
- Richard Furness (1791–1857, E)

== G ==
=== Ga–Go ===
- Frances Dana Barker Gage (1808–1884, US)
- Georgie Starbuck Galbraith (1909–1980, US)
- Dunstan Gale (fl. 1596, E)
- Kate Gale (living, US)
- James Galvin (born 1951, US)
- Patrick Galvin (1927–2011, Ir)
- Forrest Gander (born 1956, US)
- Robert Garioch (1909–1981, S)
- Hamlin Garland (1860–1940, US)
- Raymond Garlick (1926–2011, W)
- Richard Garnett (1835–1906, E)
- Jean Garrigue (1912–1972, US)
- Samuel Garth (1661–1719, E)
- George Gascoigne (1525–1577, E)
- David Gascoyne (1916–2001, E/F)
- Bill Gaston (born 1953, C)
- John Gay (1685–1732, E)
- Ross Gay (born 1974, US)
- William Gay (1865–1897, S/A)
- Alexander Geddes (1737–1802, S)
- Leon Gellert (1892–1977, A)
- W. R. P. George (1912–2006, W)
- Dan Gerber (born 1940, US)
- Amy Gerstler (born 1956, US)
- Marty Gervais (living, C)
- Charles Ghigna (born 1946, US)
- Monk Gibbon (1896–1987, Ir)
- Reginald Gibbons (born 1947, US)
- Stella Gibbons (1902–1989, E)
- Ivy Gibbs (c. 1886–1966, NZ)
- Kahlil Gibran (1883–1931, L/US)
- G. H. Gibson (Ironbark, 1846–1921, A)
- Wilfrid Wilson Gibson (1878–1962, E)
- Elsa Gidlow (1898–1986, C)
- Angus Morrison Gidney (1803–1882, C)
- Gerry Gilbert (1936–2009, C)
- Jack Gilbert (1925–2012, US)
- Kevin Gilbert (1933–1993, A)
- W. S. Gilbert (1836–1911, E)
- Ellen Gilchrist (born 1935, US)
- George Gilfillan (1813–1878, S)
- Charlotte Perkins Gilman (1860–1935, US)
- Mary Gilmore (1865–1962, A)
- Allen Ginsberg (1926–1997, US)
- Dana Gioia (born 1950, US)
- Nikki Giovanni (1943–2024, US)
- Itisha Giri (born 1983, Ne)
- Jesse Glass (born 1954, US/Jp)
- John Glassco (1909–1981, C)
- Madeline Gleason (1903–1979, US)
- Duncan Glen (1933–2008, S)
- William Glen (1789–1826, S)
- Lorri Neilsen Glenn (living, C)
- Denis Glover (1912–1980, NZ)
- Louise Glück (born 1943, US)
- Rumer Godden (1907–1998, In/E)
- Patricia Goedicke (1931–2006, US)
- Oliver St. John Gogarty (1878–1957, Ir)
- Albert Goldbarth (born 1948, US)
- Kenneth Goldsmith (born 1961, US)
- Oliver Goldsmith (1728–1774, Ir/E)
- Oliver Goldsmith (1794–1861, C)
- Peter Goldsworthy (born 1951, A)
- Leona Gom (born 1946, C)
- W. T. Goodge (1862–1909, A)
- Lorna Goodison (born 1947, J)
- Paul Goodman (1911–1972, US)
- Barnabe Googe (1540–1594, E)
- Adam Lindsay Gordon (1833–1870, A)
- Katherine L. Gordon (living, C)
- Robert Gordon of Straloch (1580–1661, S)
- Hedwig Gorski (born 1949, US)
- Edmund Gosse (1849–1928, E)
- Phyllis Gotlieb (1926–2009, C)
- Keith Gottschalk (born 1946, SA)
- Alan Gould (born 1949, A)
- Nora Gould (living, C)
- John Gower (c. 1330–1408, E)
- Susan Goyette (born 1964, C)

=== Gr–Gy ===
- James Graham, 1st Marquess of Montrose (1612–1650, S)
- Jorie Graham (born 1950, US)
- Neile Graham (born 1958, C)
- Robert Cunninghame Graham of Gartmore (1735–1797, S)
- W. S. Graham (1918–1986, S)
- James Grahame (1765–1811, S)
- Mark Granier (born 1957, E/Ir)
- Paul Grano (1894–1975, A)
- Alex Grant (living, US)
- Richard Graves (1715–1804, E)
- Richard Harry Graves (1897–1971, A)
- Robert Graves (1895–1985, E)
- Alexander Gray (1882–1968, S)
- Catherine Gray, Lady Manners (1766–1852, Ir)
- Kathryn Gray (born 1973, W)
- Maxwell Gray (Mary Gleed Tuttiett, 1846–1923, E)
- Robert Gray (born 1945, A)
- Stephen Gray (born 1941, SA)
- Thomas Gray (1716–1771, E)
- Dorothy Auchterlonie Green (1915–1991, A)
- H. M. Green (1881–1962, A)
- Paula Green (born 1955, NZ)
- Richard Greene (born 1961, C)
- Robert Greene (1558–1592, E)
- Lavinia Greenlaw (born 1962, E)
- Gavin Greenlees (1930–1983, A)
- Leslie Greentree (living, C)
- Dora Greenwell (1821–1882, E)
- Jane Greer (1953–2025, US)
- Linda Gregg (1942–2019, US)
- Horace Gregory (1898–1982, US)
- Andrew Greig (born 1951, S)
- Eamon Grennan (born 1941, Ir)
- H. W. Gretton (1914–1983, NZ)
- Fulke Greville, 1st Baron Brooke (1554–1628, E)
- Gerald Griffin (1803–1840, Ir)
- Sarah Maria Griffin (living, Ir)
- Susan Griffin (born 1943, US)
- Bill Griffiths (1948–2007, E)
- Bryn Griffiths (living, W/E)
- Jane Griffiths (born 1970, E)
- Geoffrey Grigson (1905–1985, E)
- Nicholas Grimald (1519–1562, E)
- Angelina Weld Grimké (1880–1958, US)
- Charlotte Forten Grimké (1837–1914, US)
- Eliza Griswold (born 1973, US)
- Rufus Wilmot Griswold (1815–1857, US)
- Philip Gross (born 1952, E)
- Paul Groves (born 1947, E/W)
- Bertha Jane Grundy (Mrs. Leith Adams, 1837–1912, E)
- Jeff Guess (born 1948, A)
- Barbara Guest (1920–2006, US)
- Edgar Guest (1881–1959, US)
- Paul Guest (living, US)
- Malcolm Guite (born 1957, E)
- Arthur Guiterman (1871–1943, US)
- Genni Gunn (born 1949, C)
- Thom Gunn (1929–2004, E/US)
- Kristjana Gunnars (born 1948, C)
- Lee Gurga (born 1949, US)
- Ivor Gurney (1890–1937, E)
- Ralph Gustafson (1909–1995, C)
- Mafika Gwala (1946–2014, SA)
- Cyril Gwynn (1897–1988, W/A)
- Stephen Gwynn (1864–1950, Ir)
- Beth Gylys (born 1964, US)
- Brion Gysin (1916–1986, C/E)

== H ==
=== Ha–He ===
- William Habington (1605–1654, E)
- Marilyn Hacker (born 1942, US)
- Kimiko Hahn (born 1955, US)
- John Haines (1924–2011, US)
- Paul Haines (1933–2003, US/C)
- Helen Hajnoczky (born 1985, C)
- Thomas Gordon Hake (1809–1895, E)
- Sarah Josepha Hale (1788–1879, US)
- Bernadette Hall (born 1945, NZ)
- Donald Hall (1928–2018, US)
- Megan Hall (born 1972, SA)
- Phil Hall (born 1953, C)
- Radclyffe Hall (1880–1943, E)
- Rodney Hall (born 1935, A)
- Arthur Hallam (1811–1833, E)
- Alan Halsey (born 1949, W/E)
- Michael Hamburger (1924–2007, E)
- Ian Hamilton (1938–2001, E)
- Jane Eaton Hamilton (born 1954, C)
- Janet Hamilton (1795–1873, S)
- Philip Hammial (born 1937, A)
- Robert Gavin Hampson (born 1948, E)
- Susan Hampton (born 1949, A)
- Sophie Hannah (born 1971, E)
- Bilal Haq (born 1948, P)
- Caroline Hardaker (born 1986, E)
- Kerry Hardie (born 1951, NI)
- Thomas Hardy (1840–1928, E)
- Lesbia Harford (1891–1927, A)
- Joy Harjo (born 1951, US)
- William Harmon (born 1938, US)
- Frances Harper (1825–1911, US)
- Michael S. Harper (1938–2016 US)
- Charles Harpur (1813–1868, A)
- Alice Harriman (1861–1925, US)
- Edward Harrington (1895–1966, A)
- Claire Harris (1937–2018, C)
- Joseph Harris (1773–1825, W)
- Max Harris (1921–1995, A)
- Michael Harris (born 1944, C)
- Robert Harris (1951–1993, A)
- Wilson Harris (1921–2018, Gu/E)
- Jennifer Harrison (born 1955, A)
- Jim Harrison (1937–2016, US)
- Martin Harrison (1949–2014, A)
- Richard Harrison (poet) (living, C)
- Tony Harrison (1937–2025, E)
- Les Harrop (born 1948, E/A)
- Kingsley O. Harrop-Williams (1947-2019, GU)
- Molly Harrower (1906–1999, S)
- J. S. Harry (1939–2015, A)
- Carla Harryman (born 1952, US)
- David Harsent (born 1942, E)
- Kevin Hart (born 1954, A)
- Paul Hartal (born 1936, Is/C)
- Anne Le Marquand Hartigan (living, Ir)
- Jill Hartman (born 1974, C)
- Sadakichi Hartmann (1867–1944, US)
- Michael Hartnett (1941–1999, Ir)
- Diana Hartog (born 1942, C)
- William Hart-Smith (1911–1990, NZ)
- F. W. Harvey (1888–1957, E)
- Elisabeth Harvor (1936–2024, C)
- Gwen Harwood (1920–1995, A)
- Lee Harwood (1939–2015, E)
- Alamgir Hashmi (born 1951, E)
- J. H. Haslam (1874–1969, NZ)
- Nicholas Hasluck (born 1942, A)
- Robert Hass (born 1941, US)
- Katherine Hastings (living, US)
- Ann Hatton (1764–1838, W)
- Stephen Hawes (died 1523, E)
- Robert Stephen Hawker (1803–1875, E)
- Kathleen Hawkins (1883–1981, NZ)
- George Campbell Hay (1915–1984, S)
- Gilbert Hay (born c. 1403, S)
- Myfanwy Haycock (1913–1963, W/E)
- Robert Hayden (1913–1980, US)
- William Hayley (1745–1820, E)
- Robert Hayman (1575–1629, Nf)
- Tony Haynes (born 1960, US)
- Joel Hayward (born 1964, NZ)
- Eliza Haywood (c. 1693–1756, E)
- H.D. (Hilda Doolittle, 1886–1961, E)
- Randolph Healy (born 1956, Ir)
- Seamus Heaney (1939–2013, Ir)
- Josephine D. Heard (1861 – c. 1921, US)
- John Heath-Stubbs (1918–2006, E)
- Charles Heavysege (1816–1876, C)
- James Hebblethwaite (1857–1921, A)
- Anthony Hecht (1923–2004, US)
- Jennifer Michael Hecht (born 1965, US)
- John Hegley (born 1953, E)
- Wilfrid Heighington (1897–1945, C)
- Steven Heighton (1961–2022, C)
- Anita Heiss (born 1968, A)
- Lyn Hejinian (born 1941, US)
- Jill Hellyer (1925–2012, A)
- David Helwig (1938–2018, C)
- Maggie Helwig (born 1961, C)
- Felicia Hemans (1793–1835, E)
- Kris Hemensley (born 1946, A)
- Essex Hemphill (1957–1995, US)
- Brian Henderson (born 1948, C)
- Hamish Henderson (1919–2002, S)
- Philip Henderson (1906–1977, E)
- Thomas William Heney (1862–1928, A)
- John Henley (1692–1756, E)
- William Ernest Henley (1849–1903, E)
- Adrian Henri (1932–2000, E)
- Paul Henry (born 1959, W)
- Robert Henryson (fl. 1460–1500, S)
- Thomas Nicoll Hepburn (wrote as Gabriel Setoun, 1861–1930, S)
- Dorothea Herbert (c. 1767–1829, Ir)
- Edward Herbert, 1st Baron Herbert of Cherbury (1582–1648, E/W)
- George Herbert (1593–1632, W)
- Mary Herbert, Countess of Pembroke (Mary Sidney, 1561–1621, E)
- W. N. Herbert (born 1961, S)
- Jason Heroux (born 1971, C)
- Robert Herrick (1591–1674, E)
- Steven Herrick (born 1958, A)
- Benjamin Hertwig (living, C)
- Thomas Kibble Hervey (1799–1959, E)
- Phoebe Hesketh (1909–2005, E)
- Paul Hetherington (born 1958, A)
- William Maxwell Hetherington (1803–1865, S)
- Dorothy Hewett (1923–2002, A)
- John Hewitt (1907–1987, NI)
- Maurice Hewlett (1861–1923, E)
- William Heyen (born 1940, US)
- Thomas Heywood (c. 1570s – 1650, E)

=== Hi–Hu ===
- Bob Hicok (born 1960, US)
- Dick Higgins (1938–1998, US)
- F. R. Higgins (1896–1941, Ir)
- Kevin Higgins (born 1967, Ir)
- Rita Ann Higgins (born 1955, Ir)
- Colleen Higgs (born 1962, SA)
- Charles Higham (1931–2012, A)
- Scott Hightower (born 1952, US)
- Conrad Hilberry (1928–2017, US)
- Fiona Hile (living, A)
- Barry Hill (born 1943, A)
- Edward Hill (1843–1923, US)
- Geoffrey Hill (1932–2016, E/US)
- Robert Hilles (born 1951, C)
- Richard Hillman (born 1964, A)
- Ellen Hinsey (born 1960, US)
- Jane Hirshfield (born 1953, US)
- George Hitchcock (1914–2010, US)
- H. L. Hix (born 1960, US)
- Thomas Hoccleve (c. 1368–1426, E)
- Philip Hodgins (1959–1995, A)
- Ralph Hodgson (1871–1962, E/US)
- W. N. Hodgson (1893–1916, E)
- Barbara Hofland (1770–1844, E)
- Michael Hofmann (born 1957, G/US)
- James Hogg (1770–1835, S)
- David Holbrook (1923–2011, E)
- Susan Holbrook (living, C)
- Thomas Holcroft (1745–1809, E)
- Clive Holden (living, C)
- Margaret Holford (1778–1852, E)
- Abraham Holland (died 1626, E)
- Barbara Holland (1933–2010, US)
- Hugh Holland (1569–1633, W)
- Jane Holland (born 1966, E)
- John Holland (1794–1872, E)
- Norah M. Holland (1876–1925, C)
- Sarah Holland-Batt (born 1982, A)
- John Hollander (1929–2013, US)
- Matthew Hollis (born 1971, E)
- Anselm Hollo (1934–2013, US)
- Nancy Holmes (born 1959, C)
- Oliver Wendell Holmes Sr. (1809–1894, US)
- Thomas Hood (1798–1845, E)
- Cornelia Hoogland (living, C)
- Ellen Sturgis Hooper (1812–1848, US)
- Hilda Mary Hooke (1898–1978, C)
- Harry Hooton (1908–1961, A)
- A. D. Hope (1907–2000, A)
- Christopher Hope (born 1944, SA)
- Gerard Manley Hopkins (1844–1889, E)
- Leah Horlick (living, C)
- Sean Horlor (born 1981, C)
- Frances Horovitz (1938–1983, E)
- Michael Horovitz (1935–2021, E)
- Peter Horn (1934–2019, SA)
- George Moses Horton (1797–1884, US)
- Allan Kolski Horwitz (born 1952, SA)
- Sylvester Houédard (1924–1992, Gy)
- Karen Houle (living, C)
- Joan Houlihan (living, US)
- A. E. Housman (1859–1936, E)
- Edward Howard (1793–1841, E)
- Henry Howard, Earl of Surrey (1517–1547, E)
- Liz Howard (living, C)
- Richard Howard (1929–2022, US)
- Robert Guy Howarth (1906–1974, A)
- Fanny Howe (1940–2025, US)
- George Howe (1769–1821, A)
- Julia Ward Howe (1819–1910, US)
- Susan Howe (born 1937, US)
- Ada Verdun Howell (1902–1981, A)
- Anthony Howell (born 1945, E)
- Harry Howith (1934–2014, C)
- Mary Howitt (1799–1888, E)
- Richard Howitt (1799–1869, E)
- William Howitt (1792–1879, E)
- Francis Hubert (died 1629, E)
- Thomas Hudson (d. c. 1605, S)
- Annie Campbell Huestis (1878–1960, C)
- Frieda Hughes (born 1960, A)
- Langston Hughes (1902–1967, US)
- Richard Hughes (1900–1976, E/W)
- Ted Hughes (1930–1998, E)
- Richard Hugo (1923–1982, US)
- Coral Hull (born 1965, A)
- Lynda Hull (1954–1994, US)
- T. E. Hulme (1883–1917, E)
- Alexander Hume (c. 1560–1609, S)
- Anna Hume (fl. 1644, S)
- David Hume of Godscroft (1558–1629, S)
- Barry Humphries (1934–2023, A/E)
- Emyr Humphreys (1919–2020, W)
- Helen Humphreys (born 1961, C)
- Leigh Hunt (1784–1859, E)
- Sam Hunt (born 1946, NZ)
- Aislinn Hunter (living, C)
- Al Hunter (living, C)
- Bruce Hunter (born 1952, C)
- Catherine Hunter (born 1957, C)
- Rex Hunter (1889–1960, NZ)
- Constance Hunting (1925–2006, US)
- Cynthia Huntington (born 1952, US)
- Chris Hutchinson (born 1972, C)
- Pearse Hutchinson (1927–2012, Ir)
- William Hutton (1723–1815, E)
- Aldous Huxley (1894–1963, E)
- Douglas Smith Huyghue (1816–1891, C/A)
- Douglas Hyde (1860–1949, Ir)
- Robin Hyde (pen name of Iris Wilkinson; 1906–1939, NZ)
- Helen von Kolnitz Hyer (1896–1983, US)
- Maureen Hynes (living, C)

== I ==
- John Imlah (1799–1846, S)
- Lawson Fusao Inada (born 1938, US)
- Rex Ingamells (1913–1955, A)
- Jean Ingelow (1820–1897, E)
- P. Inman (born 1947, US)
- Susan Ioannou (born 1944, C)
- Valentin Iremonger (1918–1991, Ir)
- Eric Irvin (1908–1993, A)
- Frances Itani (born 1942, C)
- Helen Ivory (born 1969, E)

== J ==
- Alan Jackson (born 1938, S)
- Violet Jacob (1863–1946, S)
- Josephine Jacobsen (1908–2003, US)
- Ethel Jacobson (1899–1991, US)
- Richard Jago (1715–1781, E)
- James I of Scotland (1394–1437, S)
- James VI and I (1566–1625, S/E)
- Alan James (living, SA)
- Clive James (1939–2019, A)
- John James (1939–2018, W/E)
- Maria James (1793–1868, W/US)
- Kathleen Jamie (born 1962, S)
- Robert Alan Jamieson (born 1958, S)
- Patricia Janus (1932–2006, US)
- Derek Jarman (1942–1994, E)
- Mark Jarman (born 1952, US)
- Lisa Jarnot (born 1967, US)
- Randall Jarrell (1914–1965, US)
- Alan Jefferies (born 1957, A)
- Robinson Jeffers (1887–1962, US)
- Isadore G. Jeffery (1840–1919, US)
- Rod Jellema (1927–1918, US)
- Jemeni (Joanne Gairy, born 1976, Gd/C)
- Graham Jenkin (born 1938, A)
- John Jenkins (born 1949, A)
- Joseph Jenkins (1818–1898, W/A)
- Mike Jenkins (born 1953, W)
- Nigel Jenkins (1949–2014, W)
- Elizabeth Jennings (1926–2001, E)
- Kate Jennings (1948–2021, A)
- Wopko Jensma (1939–1993 or after, SA)
- Sydney Jephcott (1864–1951, A)
- Paulette Jiles (born 1943, US/C)
- Liesl Jobson (living, SA)
- Rita Joe (1932–2007, C)
- Edmund John (1883–1917, E)
- Godfrey John (living, W)
- E. Pauline Johnson (1861–1913, C)
- Fenton Johnson (born 1953, US)
- Georgia Douglas Johnson (1880–1966, US)
- Helene Johnson (1906–1995, US)
- James Weldon Johnson (1871–1938, US)
- Linton Kwesi Johnson (born 1952, J)
- Lionel Johnson (1867–1902, E)
- Sallie M. Mills Johnson (1862-1927, US)
- Samuel Johnson (1709–1784, E)
- Sarah Johnson (born 1980, SA)
- George Benson Johnston (1913–2004, C)
- Martin Johnston (1947–1990, A)
- Amanda Jones (1835–1914, US)
- D. G. Jones (1929–2016, C)
- David Jones (1895–1974, E)
- Ebenezer Jones (1820–1860, E)
- El Jones (living, C)
- Emma Jones (born 1977, A)
- Evan Jones (1931–2022, A)
- Glyn Jones (1905–1995, W)
- Jack Jones (born 1992, W)
- Jill Jones (born 1951, A)
- John Joseph Jones (1930–2000, A)
- Patrick Jones (born 1965, W)
- Rae Desmond Jones (1941–2017, A)
- Richard Jones (living, US)
- Terry Jones (1942–2020, W/E)
- Erica Jong (born 1942, US)
- Ben Jonson (1573–1637, E)
- Julie Joosten (born 1980, US/C)
- John Jordan (1930–1988, Ir)
- June Jordan (1936–2002, J/US)
- Anthony Joseph (born 1966, T/E)
- Eve Joseph (born 1953, C)
- Jenny Joseph (1932–2018, E)
- Danilo Jovanovitch (1919–2015, A)
- James Joyce (1882–1941, Ir/I)
- Trevor Joyce (born 1947, Ir)
- Frank Judge (living, US)
- A. M. Juster (born 1956, US)
- Donald Justice (1925–2004, US)

== K ==
- Jim Kacian (born 1953, US)
- Aryan Kaganof (born 1964, SA)
- Chester Kallman (1921–1975, US)
- Surjeet Kalsey (living, C)
- Smaro Kamboureli (living, C)
- Ilya Kaminsky (born 1977, US)
- Julie Kane (born 1952, US)
- Adeena Karasick (born 1965, C/US)
- Mary Karr (born 1955, US)
- Julia Kasdorf (born 1962, US)
- Laura Kasischke (born 1961, US)
- Bob Kaufman (1925–1986, US)
- Shirley Kaufman (1923–2016, US)
- Rupi Kaur (born 1992, C)
- Patrick Kavanagh (1904–1967, Ir)
- Jackie Kay (born 1961, S)
- Jayne Fenton Keane (living, A)
- Lionel Kearns (born 1937, C)
- Annie Keary (1825–1879, E)
- Diane Keating (living, C)
- John Keats (1795–1821, E)
- John Keble (1792–1866, E)
- Janice Kulyk Keefer (born 1952, C)
- Weldon Kees (1914–1955, US)
- Nancy Keesing (1923–1993, A)
- Antigone Kefala (1935–2022, A)
- Christopher Kelen (born 1958, A)
- S. K. Kelen (born 1956, A)
- Anne Kellas (born 1951, SA/A)
- Isabella Kelly (1759–1857, S/E)
- M. T. Kelly (born 1946, C)
- Arthur Kelton (died c. 1550, E/W)
- Penn Kemp (born 1944, C)
- Henry Kendall (1839–1882, A)
- Francis Kenna (1865–1932, A)
- Cate Kennedy (born 1963, A)
- Geoffrey Studdert Kennedy ("Woodbine Willy", 1883–1929, E)
- Leo Kennedy (1907–2000, C)
- Miranda Kennedy (born 1975, US)
- Walter Kennedy (c. 1455 – c. 1508, S)
- X. J. Kennedy (1929–2026, US)
- Jean Kent (born 1951, A)
- Jane Kenyon (1947–1995, US)
- Robert Kirkland Kernighan (1854–1926, C)
- Jack Kerouac (1922–1969, US)
- Sidney Keyes (1922–1943, E)
- Keorapetse Kgositsile (1938–2018, SA/US)
- Mimi Khalvati (born 1944, E)
- Charles Kickham (1828–1882, Ir)
- Anne Killigrew (1660–1685, E)
- Joyce Kilmer (1886–1918, US)
- Arthur Henry King (1910–2000, E/US)
- Henry King (1592–1669, E)
- William King (1663–1712, E)
- Charles Kingsley (1819–1875, E)
- Barbara Kingsolver (born 1955, US)
- Galway Kinnell (1927–2014, US)
- John Kinsella (born 1963, A)
- Thomas Kinsella (1928–2021, Ir)
- Rudyard Kipling (1865–1936, E)
- Olga Kirsch (1924–1997, SA/Is)
- Roy Kiyooka (1926–1994, C)
- Carolyn Kizer (1925–1914, US)
- Barbara Klar (born 1966, C)
- Sarah Klassen (born 1932, C)
- A. M. Klein (1909–1972, C)
- August Kleinzahler (born 1949, US)
- Etheridge Knight (1931–1991, US)
- Stephen Knight (born 1960, W/E)
- Raymond Knister (1899–1932, C)
- Kenneth Koch (1925–2002, US)
- Ruth Ellen Kocher (born 1965, US)
- Joy Kogawa (born 1935, C)
- komninos (born 1950, A)
- Yusef Komunyakaa (born 1947, US)
- Ted Kooser (born 1939, US)
- Shane Koyczan (born 1976, C)
- Rustum Kozain (born 1966, SA)
- Rudi Krausmann (1933–2019, A)
- Ruth Krauss (1901–1993, US)
- Carolyn Kreiter-Foronda (born 1946, US)
- Uys Krige (1910–1987, SA)
- Robert Kroetsch (1927–2011, C)
- Antjie Krog (born 1952, SA)
- Anton Robert Krueger (born 1971, SA)
- Marilyn Krysl (born 1942, US)
- Anatoly Kudryavitsky (born 1954, Ir)
- Abhay Kumar (born 1980, In)
- Mazisi Kunene (1930–2006, SA)
- Tuli Kupferberg (1923–2010, US)
- Maxine Kumin (1925–2014, US)
- Stanley Kunitz (1905–2006, US)
- Frank Kuppner (born 1951, S)
- Stephen Kuusisto (born 1955, US)
- Morris Kyffin (c. 1555–1598, W/E)
- Joanne Kyger (1934–2017, US)
- Francis Kynaston (1587–1642, E)

== L ==
=== La–Ln ===
- John La Rose (1927–2006, J/E)
- Sonnet L'Abbé (born 1973, C)
- Edward A. Lacey (1938–1995, C)
- Mike Ladd (born 1959, A)
- Ben Ladouceur (born 1987, C)
- Nick Laird (born 1975, NI)
- David Lake (1929–2016, A)
- Philip Lamantia (1927–2005, US)
- Kendrick Lamar (born 1987, US)
- Charles Lamb (1775–1834, E)
- Archibald Lampman (1861–1899, C)
- Tim Lander (1938–2023, C)
- Letitia Elizabeth Landon (1802–1838, E)
- Walter Savage Landor (1775–1864, E)
- M. Travis Lane (born 1934, US/C)
- Patrick Lane (1939–2019, C)
- Andrew Lang (1844–1912, S)
- D. L. Lang (born 1983, US)
- William Langland (c. 1332 – c. 1386, E)
- Eve Langley (1904–1974, A)
- Emilia Lanier (1569–1645, E)
- Sidney Lanier (1842–1881, US)
- Lucy Larcom (1824–1893, US)
- Rebecca Hammond Lard (1772–1855, US)
- Bruce Larkin (born 1957, US)
- Philip Larkin (1922–1985, E)
- Richard Latewar (1560–1601, E)
- Evelyn Lau (born 1971, C)
- James Laughlin (1914–1997, US)
- Ann Lauterbach (born 1942, US)
- Dorianne Laux (born 1952, US)
- Emily Lawless (1845–1913, Ir)
- Anthony Lawrence (born 1957, A)
- D. H. Lawrence (1885–1930, E)
- Henry Lawson (1867–1922, A)
- Louisa Lawson (1848–1920, A)
- Robert Lax (1915–2000, US)
- Layamon (late 12th – early 13th c., E)
- Irving Layton (1912–2006, C)
- Emma Lazarus (1849–1887, US)
- Augustus Asplet Le Gros (1840–1877, Je)
- Bronwyn Lea (living, A)
- Mary Leapor (1722–1746, E)
- Edward Lear (1812–1888, E)
- Lesley Lebkowicz (born 1946, A)
- Francis Ledwidge (1887–1917, Ir)
- David Lee (born 1944, US)
- Dennis Lee (born 1939, C)
- John B. Lee (born 1951, C)
- Muna Lee (1895–1965, US)
- Lily Alice Lefevre (1854–1938, C)
- Anne Brydges Lefroy (1747/8–1804, E)
- Joy Leftow (born 1949, US)
- Sylvia Legris (born 1960, C)
- Ursula K. Le Guin (1929–2018, US)
- David Lehman (born 1948, US)
- Geoffrey Lehmann (born 1940, A)
- Brad Leithauser (born 1953, US)
- Mark Lemon (1809–1870, E)
- Sue Lenier (born 1957, E)
- Charlotte Lennox (c. 1730–1804, S/E)
- John Lent (living, C)
- John Leonard (born 1965, A)
- Tom Leonard (1944–2018, S)
- William Ellery Leonard (1876–1944, US)
- Douglas LePan (1914–1998, C)
- Ben Lerner (born 1979, US)
- Alex Leslie (living, C)
- Rika Lesser (born 1953, US)
- Lilian Leveridge (1879–1953, C)
- Denise Levertov (1923–1997, E/US)
- Dana Levin (born 1965, US)
- Philip Levine (1928–2015, US)
- Larry Levis (1946–1996, US)
- D. A. Levy (1942–1968, US)
- William Levy (1939–2019, US/Nt)
- Emma Lew (born 1962, A)
- Oswald LeWinter (1931–2013, US)
- Alun Lewis (1915–1944, W)
- C. S. Lewis (1898–1963, Ir/E)
- Gwyneth Lewis (born 1959, W)
- J. Patrick Lewis (born 1942, US)
- Wyndham Lewis (1882–1957, E)
- Anne Ley (c. 1599–1641, E)
- Tim Liardet (born 1959, E)
- Isabella Lickbarrow (1784–1847, E)
- James Liddy (1934–2008, Ir)
- Tim Lilburn (born 1950, C)
- Charles Lillard (1944–1997, C)
- Kate Lilley (born 1960, A)
- Tao Lin (born 1983, US)
- Ada Limón (born 1976, US)
- Jack Lindeman (living, US)
- Eddie Linden (1935–2023, S/E)
- Anne Morrow Lindbergh (1906–2001, US)
- Jack Lindsay (1900–1990, A/E)
- Maurice Lindsay (1918–2009, S)
- Sarah Lindsay (born 1958, US)
- Vachel Lindsay (1879–1931, US)
- Jessie Litchfield (1883–1956, A)
- Dorothy Livesay (1909–1996, C)
- Billie Livingston (living, C)
- Douglas Livingstone (1932–1996, SA)

=== Lo–Ly ===
- Douglas Lochhead (1922–2011, C)
- Liz Lochhead (born 1947, S)
- Terry Locke (born 1946, NZ)
- Thomas Lodge (1556–1625, E)
- John Logan (1748–1788, S/E)
- Christopher Logue (1926–2011, E)
- James Longenbach (living, US)
- Henry Wadsworth Longfellow (1807–1882, US)
- Michael Longley (1939–2025, NI)
- John Longmuir (1803–1883, S)
- Audre Lorde (1934–1992, US)
- LindaAnn Loschiavo (living, US)
- Marguerite St. Leon Loud (1812–1889, US)
- Mary Stanley Low (1912–2007, Cu F US)
- Jennifer LoveGrove (living, C)
- Richard Lovelace (1618–1658, E)
- Henry Lovelich (fl. mid-15th c., E)
- Samuel Lover (1797–1868, Ir/E)
- Amy Lowell (1874–1925, US)
- James Russell Lowell (1819–1891, US)
- Maria White Lowell (1821–1853, US)
- Robert Lowell (1917–1977, US)
- Pat Lowther (1935–1975, C)
- Mina Loy (1882–1966, E/US)
- Edward Lucie-Smith (born 1933, E)
- Fitz Hugh Ludlow (1836–1870, US)
- Tatjana Lukić (1959–2008, A)
- Suzanne Lummis (living, US)
- Laura Lush (born 1959, C)
- Richard Lush (born 1934, C)
- Thomas Lux (1946–2017, US)
- John Lydgate (1370–1450, E)
- John Lyly (1553–1606, E)
- Michael Lynch (1944–1991, US/C)
- David Lyndsay (c. 1490 – c. 1555, S)
- P. H. B. Lyon (1893–1986, E)
- Henry Francis Lyte (1793–1847, S)
- George Lyttelton Lord Lyttelton (1709–1773, E)

== M ==
=== Ma–Mi ===
- Rozena Maart (born 1962, SA/C)
- Lindiwe Mabuza (1938–2021, US/SA)
- Frederick Macartney (1887–1980, A)
- Thomas Babington Macaulay (1800–1859, E)
- George MacBeth (1932–1992, S)
- Norman MacCaig (1910–1996, S)
- Denis Florence MacCarthy (1817–1882, Ir)
- Karen Mac Cormack (born 1956, C/US)
- Hugh MacDiarmid (1892–1978, S)
- Donagh MacDonagh (1912–1968, Ir)
- Thomas MacDonagh (1878–1916, Ir)
- Allan MacDonald (1859–1905, S)
- Elizabeth Roberts MacDonald (1864–1922, C)
- George Macdonald (1824–1905, S)
- Hugh MacDonald (born 1945, C)
- Wilson MacDonald (1880–1967, C)
- Patrick MacDonogh (1902–1961, Ir)
- Gwendolyn MacEwen (1941–1987, C)
- Seán Mac Falls (1957–2023, Ir)
- Walter Scott MacFarlane (1896–1979, C)
- Patrick MacGill (1889–1963, Ir)
- Alasdair Alpin MacGregor (1899–1970, S)
- Ronald Campbell Macfie (1867–1931, S)
- James Pittendrigh Macgillivray (1856–1938, S)
- Thomas MacGreevy (1893–1967, Ir)
- Arthur Machen (1863–1947, W/E)
- Tom MacInnes (1867–1951, C)
- Louise Mack (1870–1935, A)
- John William Mackail (1859–1945, S)
- John Macken (c. 1784–1823, Ir)
- Lachlan Mackinnon (born 1956, S)
- Compton Mackenzie (1883–1972, S)
- Kenneth Mackenzie (Seaforth Mackenzie, 1913–1955, A)
- Archibald MacLeish (1892–1982, US)
- Dorothea Mackellar (1885–1968, A)
- Don Maclennan (1929–2009, SA)
- Joseph Macleod (1903–1984, E)
- Nathaniel Mackey (born 1947, US)
- Don Maclennan (1929–2009, SA)
- Jackson Mac Low (1922–2004, US)
- Louis MacNeice (1907–1963, Ir/E)
- Kevin MacNeil (living, S)
- Hector Macneill (1746–1818, S)
- Lachlan Mackinnon (born 1956, S)
- Alasdair Maclean (1926–1994, S)
- Archibald MacLeish (1892–1982, US)
- Andrea MacPherson (living, C)
- James Macpherson (1736–1796, S)
- Jay Macpherson (1931–2012, C)
- Barry MacSweeney (1948–2000, E)
- Haki R. Madhubuti (born 1942, US)
- John Gillespie Magee Jr. (1922–1941, C)
- Wes Magee (1939–2021, S)
- Jayanta Mahapatra (1928–2023, In)
- Sitakant Mahapatra (born 1937, In)
- Mzi Mahola (born 1949, SA)
- Derek Mahon (born 1941, NI)
- Jennifer Maiden (born 1949, A)
- Keith Maillard (born 1942, US/C)
- Charles Mair (1838–1827, C)
- Alice Major (born 1949, C)
- Clarence Major (born 1936, US)
- Robert Majzels (born 1950, C)
- Taylor Mali (born 1965, US)
- David Mallet (c. 1705–1765, S)
- Thomas Malory (c. 1415–1471, E)
- David Malouf (1934–2026, A)
- Kim Maltman (born 1951, C)
- Eli Mandel (1922–1992, C)
- Tom Mandel (born 1942, US)
- Ahdri Zhina Mandiela (born 1953, J/C)
- James Clarence Mangan (1803–1849, Ir)
- Bill Manhire (born 1946, NZ)
- David Manicom (born 1960, C)
- John Manifold (1915–1985, A)
- Leonard Mann (1895–1981, A)
- Emily Manning (1845–1890, A)
- Frederic Manning (1882–1935, A)
- Maurice Manning (born 1966, US)
- Ruth Manning-Sanders (1886–1988, W)
- Robert Mannyng (1269–1340, E)
- Chris Mansell (born 1953, A)
- Peter Manson (born 1969, S)
- Lee Maracle (1950–2021, C)
- Blaine Marchand (born 1949, C)
- Morton Marcus (1936–2009, US)
- Paul Mariani (born 1940, US)
- E. A. Markham (1939–2008, Mo/E)
- Edwin Markham (1852–1940, US)
- Nicole Markotic (born 1962, C)
- Daphne Marlatt (born 1942, C)
- Christopher Marlowe (1564–1593, E)
- Don Marquis (1878–1937, US)
- Edward Garrard Marsh (1783–1862, E)
- Tom Marshall (1938–1993, C)
- John Marston (1576–1634, E)
- Garth Martens (living, C)
- Camille Martin (born 1956, C)
- David Martin (1915–1997, E/A)
- Philip Martin (1931–2005, A)
- Theodore Martin (1816–1909, S)
- Sid Marty (born 1944, C)
- Andrew Marvell (1621–1678, E)
- John Masefield (1878–1967, E)
- Lebogang Mashile (born 1979, SA)
- R. A. K. Mason (1905–1971, NZ)
- Edgar Lee Masters (1868–1950, US)
- John Mateer (born 1971, A)
- Ray Mathew (1929–2002, A)
- Robin Mathews (1931–2023, C)
- Roland Mathias (1915–2007, W)
- Cleopatra Mathis (born 1947, US)
- Don Mattera (1935–2022, SA)
- James Matthews (1929–2024, SA)
- Glyn Maxwell (born 1962, E)
- Bernadette Mayer (born 1945, US)
- Micheline Maylor (born 1970, C)
- Seymour Mayne (born 1944, C)
- Chandra Mayor (born 1973, C)
- Ben Mazer (born 1964, US)
- Mzwakhe Mbuli (born 1959, SA)
- James McAuley (1917–1976, A)
- Robert McBride (c. 1811/1812–1895, C)
- Neil McBride (1861–1942, Ir)
- Ian McBryde (born 1953, A)
- Brian McCabe (born 1951, S)
- Steven McCabe (living, C)
- Steve McCaffery (born 1947, C)
- Julia McCarthy (living, C)
- Susan McCaslin (born 1947, C)
- J. D. McClatchy (1945–2018, US)
- Kim McClenaghan (born 1974, SA/E)
- Michael McClure (1932–2020, US)
- Kathleen McConnell (Kathy Mac, living, C)
- David McCooey (born 1967, A)
- George Gordon McCrae (1833–1927, A)
- John McCrae (1872–1918, C)
- Shane McCrae (born 1975, US)
- Kathleen McCracken (born 1960, C)
- John McCrae (1872–1918, C)
- Ronald McCuaig (1908–1993, A)
- Matthew McDiarmid (1914–1996, S)
- Nan McDonald (1921–1974, A)
- Roger McDonald (born 1941, A)
- Roy McDonald (1937–2018, C)
- Walt McDonald (1934–2022, US)
- David McFadden (1940–2018, C)
- Hugh McFadden (living, Ir)
- David McGimpsey (living, C)
- Phyllis McGinley (1905–1978, US)
- Elvis McGonagall (born 1960, S)
- William McGonagall (1825–1902, S)
- Roger McGough (born 1937, E)
- Michelle McGrane (born 1974, Z/SA)
- Campbell McGrath (born 1962, US)
- Thomas McGrath (1916–1990, US)
- Wendy McGrath (living, C)
- Medbh McGuckian (born 1950, NI)
- Heather McHugh (born 1948, US)
- William McIlvanney (1936–2015, S)
- Nadine McInnis (born 1957, C)
- James McIntyre (1828–1906, S/C)
- Claude McKay (1889–1948, J/US)
- Don McKay (born 1942, C)
- Barry McKinnon (born 1944, C)
- Rod McKuen (1933–2015, US)
- Greg McLaren (born 1967, A)
- Isaac McLellan (1806–1899, US)
- John McLellan (early 19th century, E)
- Brendan McLeod (born 1979, C)
- Nigel McLoughlin (born 1968, NI)
- Emily Julian McManus (1865–1918, C)
- Rhyll McMaster (born 1947, A)
- Susan McMaster (born 1950, C)
- James L. McMichael (born 1939, US)
- Ian McMillan (born 1956, E)
- Eugene McNamara (1930–2016, US/C)
- Anthony McNeill (1941–1996, J)
- Andrew McNeillie (born 1946, W/E)
- Hollie McNish (born 1984, E)
- Bernard McNulty (1842–1892, US)
- Steve McOrmond (living, C)
- Dionyse McTair (born 1950, T)
- Máighréad Medbh (born 1959, Ir]
- Thomas Medwin (1788–1869, E)
- Paula Meehan (born 1955, Ir)
- Peter Meinke (born 1932, US)
- Mary Melfi (born 1951, C)
- Elizabeth Melville (c. 1578 – c. 1640, S)
- Herman Melville (1819–1891, US)
- Christopher Meredith (born 1955, W)
- George Meredith (1828–1909, E)
- Louisa Anne Meredith (1812–1895, E/A)
- James Merrill (1926–1995, US)
- Stuart Merrill (1863–1915, US)
- Iman Mersal (born 1966, C)
- Thomas Merton (1915–1968, US)
- W. S. Merwin (1927–2019, US)
- Sarah Messer (born 1966, US)
- Joan Metelerkamp (born 1956, SA)
- Charlotte Mew (1869–1928, E)
- Bruce Meyer (born 1957, C)
- Alice Meynell (1847–1922, E)
- Viola Meynell (1885–1956, E)
- James Lionel Michael (1824–1868, E/A)
- Anne Michaels (born 1958, C)
- William Julius Mickle (1734–1788, S)
- Marianne Micros (born 1943, C)
- Christopher Middleton (c. 1560–1628, E)
- Christopher Middleton (1926–2015, E)
- Richard Barham Middleton (1882–1911, E)
- Thomas Middleton (1580–1627, E)
- Roy Miki (born 1942, C)
- Dorothy Miles (1931–1993, W/US)
- Josephine Miles (1911–1985, US)
- Jennifer Militello (living, US)
- Edna St. Vincent Millay (1892–1950, US)
- Alice Duer Miller (1874–1942, US)
- Jane Miller (born 1949, US)
- Joaquin Miller (1837–1913, US)
- Leslie Adrienne Miller (born 1956, US)
- Ruth Miller (1919–1969, SA)
- Thomas Miller (1807–1874, E)
- Vassar Miller (1924–1998, US)
- John Millett (1921–2019, A)
- Robert Millhouse (1788–1839, E)
- Alice Milligan (1865–1953, Ir/NI)
- Spike Milligan (1918–2002, E/Ir)
- Kenneth G. Mills (1923–2004, C)
- Roswell George Mills (1896–1966, C)
- John Milton (1608–1674, E)
- Robert Minhinnick (born 1952, W)
- Matthew Minicucci (born 1981, US)
- Gary Miranda (born 1939, US)
- Sudesh Mishra (born 1962, A)
- Adrian Mitchell (1932–2008, E)
- Paul Mitchell (born 1968, A)
- Silas Weir Mitchell (1829–1914, US)
- Stephen Mitchell (born 1943, US)
- Waddie Mitchell (born 1950, US)
- Naomi Mitchison (1897–1999, S)
- Amitabh Mitra (living, SA)
- Ange Mlinko (born 1960, US)

=== Mo–Mu ===
- David Macbeth Moir (1798–1851, S)
- Anis Mojgani (born 1977, US)
- John Mole (born 1941, E)
- Natalia Molebatsi (living, SA)
- Dorothy Molloy (1942–2004, Ir)
- Geraldine Monk (born 1952, E)
- Harold Monro (1879–1932, E)
- Harriet Monroe (1860–1936, US)
- Charles Montagu, 1st Earl of Halifax (1661–1715, E)
- John Montague (1929–2016, Ir)
- Lady Mary Wortley Montagu (1689–1762, E)
- Alexander Montgomerie (c. 1550–1598, S)
- James Montgomery (1771–1854, E)
- Lucy Maud Montgomery (L. M. Montgomery, 1874–1942, C)
- Marion E. Moodie (1867–1958, C)
- Susanna Moodie (1803–1885, E/C)
- Kobus Moolman (living, SA)
- Jacob McArthur Mooney (born 1983, C)
- Alan Moore (born 1960, Ir)
- Marianne Moore (1887–1972, US)
- Merrill Moore (1903–1957, US)
- Ruth Moore (1903–1989, US)
- T. Inglis Moore (1901–1978, A)
- Thomas Moore (1779–1852, Ir/E)
- Thomas Sturge Moore (1870–1944, E)
- Dom Moraes (1938–2004, In)
- Barbara Moraff (born 1939, US)
- Cherríe Moraga (born 1952, US)
- Edythe Morahan de Lauzon (fl. early 20th c., C)
- Pamela Mordecai (born 1942, J/C)
- Hannah More (1745–1833, E)
- Dwayne Morgan (born 1974, C)
- Edwin Morgan (1920–2010, S)
- J. O. Morgan (born 1978, S)
- Jeffrey Morgan (living, C)
- Mal Morgan (1936–1999, A)
- Robin Morgan (born 1941, US)
- A. F. Moritz (born 1947, US/C)
- Eliza F. Morris (1821–1874, E)
- Mervyn Morris (born 1937, J)
- Sharon Morris (living, W/E)
- William Morris (1834–1896, E)
- David R. Morrison (1941–2012, S)
- Jim Morrison (1943–1971, US)
- Morrissey (born 1959, E)
- Kim Morrissey (Janice Dales, living, C)
- Garry Thomas Morse (living, C)
- Viggo Mortensen (born 1958, US/De)
- Colin Morton (born 1948, C)
- Frank Morton (1869–1923, A)
- Twm Morys (born 1961, W)
- Daniel David Moses (born 1952, C)
- Howard Moss (1922–1987, US)
- Thylias Moss (born 1954, US)
- Isabella Motadinyane (1963–2003, SA)
- William Motherwell (1797–1835, S)
- Andrew Motion (born 1952, E)
- Seitlhamo Motsapi (born 1966, SA)
- Casey Motsisi (1932–1977, SA)
- Eric Mottram (1924–1995, E)
- Erín Moure (born 1955, C)
- Oswald Mbuyiseni Mtshali (born 1940, SA)
- Ian Mudie (1911–1976, A)
- Mudrooroo (Colin Thomas Johnson, 1938–2019, A)
- Lisel Mueller (1924–2020, US)
- Micere Githae Mugo (1942–2023, K/Z)
- Edwin Muir (1887–1959, S/E)
- Paul Muldoon (born 1951, Ir/US)
- Wendy Mulford (born 1941, W/E)
- Harryette Mullen (born 1953, US)
- Laura Mullen (born 1958, US)
- Anthony Munday (c. 1560–1633, E)
- Jane Munro (born 1943, C)
- Sachiko Murakami (born 1980, C)
- William Murdoch (1823–1887, S/C)
- Edwin Greenslade Murphy (Dryblower, 1866–1939, A)
- Hayden Murphy (born 1945, Ir)
- Richard Murphy (1927–2018, Ir/SLk)
- Sheila Murphy (born 1951, US)
- Charles Murray (1864–1941, S)
- George Murray (born 1971, C)
- Joan Murray (born 1945, US)
- Les Murray (1938–2019, A)
- David Musgrave (born 1965, A)
- Susan Musgrave (born 1951, C)
- Togara Muzanenhamo (born 1975, Z)

== N ==
- Vladimir Nabokov (1899–1977, RE/US)
- Constance Naden (1858–1889, E)
- Sarojini Naidu (1879–1949, In)
- Carolina Nairne (1766–1845, S)
- Sydney Elliott Napier (1870–1940, A)
- Akhtar Naraghi (living, C)
- Ogden Nash (1902–1971, US)
- Roger Nash (born 1942, E/C)
- Thomas Nashe (1567–1601, E)
- John Neal (1793–1876, US)
- Charles Neaves (1800–1876, S)
- Henry Neele (1798–1828, E)
- Lyle Neff (born 1969, C)
- John Neihardt (1881–1973, US)
- William Neill (1922–2010, S)
- Philip Neilsen (living, A)
- Shaw Neilson (1872–1942, A)
- Alice Dunbar Nelson (1875–1935, US)
- Holly Nelson (living, US/C)
- Marilyn Nelson (born 1946, US)
- Howard Nemerov (1920–1991, US)
- Kenn Nesbitt (born 1962, US)
- W. H. New (born 1938, C)
- Henry Newbolt (1862–1938, E)
- John Newlove (1938–2003, C)
- John Henry Newman (1801–1890, E)
- Kate Newmann (born 1965, NI/Ir)
- William Newton (1750–1830, E)
- Aimee Nezhukumatathil (born 1974, US)
- Nuala Ní Chonchúir (born 1970, Ir)
- Eiléan Ní Chuilleanáin (born 1942, Ir)
- Nuala Ní Dhomhnaill (born 1952, Ir)
- Ailbhe Ní Ghearbhuigh (born 1984, Ir)
- Doireann Ní Ghríofa (born 1981, Ir)
- Nicholas of Guildford (12th or 13th c., E)
- Barrie Phillip Nichol (bpNichol, 1944–1988, C)
- Grace Nichols (born 1950, Gu/E)
- Robert Nichols (1893–1944, E)
- Cecily Nicholson (living, C)
- Norman Nicholson (1914–1987, E)
- Lorine Niedecker (1903–1970, US)
- Emilia Nielsen (living, C)
- Hume Nisbet (1849–1923, A/S)
- Christopher Nolan (1965–2009, Ir)
- Oodgeroo Noonuccal (1920–1993, A)
- Leslie Norris (1921–2006, W/US)
- Harry Northup (born 1940, US)
- Arthur Nortje (1942–1970, SA)
- Caroline Norton (1808–1877, E)
- Alice Notley (born 1945, US)
- Alden Nowlan (1933–1983, C)
- Alfred Noyes (1880–1958, E)
- Jeff Nuttall (1933–2004, E)
- Naomi Shihab Nye (born 1952, US)
- Robert Nye (1939–2016, E)

== O ==
- Joyce Carol Oates (born 1938, US)
- John O'Brien (Patrick Joseph Hartigan, 1878–1952, A)
- Sean O'Brien (born 1952, E)
- Patrick O'Connell (1944–2005, C)
- Mark O'Connor (born 1945, A)
- Philip O'Connor (1916–1998, E)
- Mary O'Donnell (born 1954, Ir)
- Bernard O'Donoghue (born 1945, Ir)
- Gregory O'Donoghue (1951–2005, Ir)
- Bernard O'Dowd (1866–1953, A)
- Dennis O'Driscoll (born 1954, Ir)
- Ernest O'Ferrall (1881–1925, A)
- Ron Offen (1930–2010, US)
- William Henry Ogilvie (1869–1963, S)
- Frank O'Hara (1926–1966, US)
- John Bernard O'Hara (1862–1927, A)
- Theodore O'Hara (1820–1867, US)
- Pixie O'Harris (1903–1991, A)
- Sharon Olds (born 1942, US)
- Alexandra Oliver (living, C)
- Mary Oliver (1935–2019, US)
- Redell Olsen (born 1971, E)
- Charles Olson (1910–1970, US)
- Sheree-Lee Olson (born 1954, C)
- Nessa O'Mahony (living, Ir)
- David O'Meara (born 1968, C)
- Michael Ondaatje (born 1943, SLk/C)
- Heather O'Neill (born 1973, C)
- Henrietta O'Neill (1758–1793, Ir)
- Mary Devenport O'Neill (1879–1976, Ir)
- George Oppen (1908–1984, US)
- Mary Oppen (1908–1990, US)
- Antoine Ó Raifteirí (1784–1835, Ir)
- Edward Otho Cresap Ord, II (1858–1923, US)
- Dowell O'Reilly (1865–1923, A)
- Peter Orlovsky (1933–2010, US)
- John Ormond (1923–1990, W)
- Frank Ormsby (born 1947, NI)
- Gregory Orr (born 1947, US)
- Arthur O'Shaughnessy (1844–1881, E)
- Micheal O'Siadhail (born 1947, Ir)
- Alicia Ostriker (born 1937, US)
- Maggie O'Sullivan (born 1951, E)
- Seumas O'Sullivan (1879–1958, Ir)
- Niyi Osundare (born 1947, Ni/US)
- Alice Oswald (born 1966, E)
- John Oswald (died 1793, S)
- Eoghan Ó Tuairisc (1919–1982, Ir)
- Richard Outram (1930–2005, C)
- Ouyang Yu (歐陽昱; born 1955, A)
- Catherine Owen (living, C)
- Jan Owen (born 1940, A)
- Wilfred Owen (1893–1918, E)

== P ==
- Susan Paddon (living, C)
- Ruth Padel (born 1947, E)
- Ron Padgett (born 1942, US)
- Isabel Pagan (c. 1740–1821, S)
- Geoff Page (born 1940, A)
- P. K. Page (1916–2010, C)
- Janet Paisley (1948–2018, S)
- Grace Paley (1922–2007, E)
- Francis Turner Palgrave (1824–1897, E)
- Michael Palmer (born 1943, US)
- Nettie Palmer (1885–1964, A)
- Vance Palmer (1885–1959, A)
- Sylvia Pankhurst (1882–1960, E)
- William Williams Pantycelyn (W)
- Aristides Paradissis (1923–2006, A)
- Arleen Paré (born 1946, C)
- Dorothy Parker (1893–1967, US)
- Amy Parkinson (1855–1938, C)
- Thomas Parnell (1670–1718, Ir/E)
- Robert Parry (1540–1612, W)
- Lisa Pasold (living, C)
- John Pass (born 1947, C)
- Linda Pastan (1932–2023, US)
- Kenneth Patchen (1911–1972, US)
- Banjo Paterson (1864–1941, A)
- Don Paterson (born 1963, S)
- Coventry Patmore (1823–1896, E)
- Brian Patten (born 1946, E)
- Ian Patterson (born 1948, E)
- Philip Kevin Paul (living, C)
- Tom Paulin (born 1949, NI/E)
- Ricardo Pau-Llosa (born 1954, Cu)
- James Payn (1830–1898, E/S)
- Molly Peacock (born 1947, US/C)
- Thomas Love Peacock (1785–1866, E)
- Patrick Pearse (1879–1916, Ir)
- Soraya Peerbaye (living, C)
- Pearl Poet (14th c., E)
- Patrick Pearse (1879–1916, Ir)
- James Larkin Pearson (1879–1981, US)
- Neil Peart (1952–2020, C)
- Kathleen Peirce (born 1956, US)
- J. D. C. Pellow (1890–1960, E)
- Nathan Penlington (living, W/E)
- Anne Penny (1729–1784, W/E)
- Margaret Pennyman (bap. 1685, d. 1733), E
- Hilary Douglas Clark Pepler (1878–1951, E)
- Sam Pereira (born 1949, US)
- Lucia Perillo (1958–2016, US)
- Grace Perry (1927–1987, A)
- Alice E. Heckler Peters (1845–1921, US)
- Lenrie Peters (1932–2009, Ga)
- Robert Peters (1924–2014, US)
- Pascale Petit (born 1953, W)
- Mario Petrucci (born 1958, E)
- W. T. Pfefferle (born 1962, C)
- Anna Augusta Von Helmholtz-Phelan (1890–1964, US)
- M. NourbeSe Philip (born 1947, T/C)
- Ambrose Philips (1674–1749, E)
- Katherine Philips (1631/1632–1664, E/W)
- Ben Phillips (born 1947, C)
- Eden Phillpotts (1862–1960, E)
- Alison Pick (born 1975, C)
- Tom Pickard (born 1946, E)
- Leah Lakshmi Piepzna-Samarasinha (born 1975, US/C)
- Marge Piercy (born 1936, US)
- Laetitia Pilkington (c. 1709–1750, Ir/E)
- Mary Pilkington (1761–1839, E)
- Sarah Pinder (living, C)
- Percy Edward Pinkerton (1855–1946, E)
- Robert Pinsky (born 1940, US)
- George Pirie (1799–1870, C)
- Christopher Pitt (1699–1748, E)
- Marie Pitt (1869–1948, A)
- Ruth Pitter (1897–1992, E)
- Al Pittman (1940–2001, C)
- Marjorie Pizer (1920–2016, A)
- Sylvia Plath (1932–1963, US/E)
- William Plomer (1903–1973, SA/E)
- Edward Plunkett, 18th Baron of Dunsany (1878–1957, Ir/E)
- Joseph Plunkett (1887–1916, Ir)
- Edgar Allan Poe (1809–1849, US)
- Emily Pohl-Weary (born 1973, C)
- Craig Poile (living, C)
- Suman Pokhrel (born 1967, Ne)
- Marcella Polain (born 1958, A)
- Margaret Steuart Pollard (1904–1996, E)
- Edward Pollock (1823–1858, US)
- Robert Pollok (c. 1798–1827, S)
- John Pomfret (1667–1702, E)
- Marie Ponsot (1921–2019, US)
- John Pook (born 1942, W/F)
- Sandy Pool (living, C)
- Marie Ponsot (1921–2019, US)
- Alexander Pope (1688–1744, E)
- Judith Pordon (born 1954, US)
- Anna Maria Porter (1780–1832, E)
- Dorothy Porter (1954–2008, A)
- Hal Porter (1911–1984, A)
- Peter Porter (1929–2010, A)
- Rochelle Potkar (born 1979, In)
- Robert Potter (1721–1804, E)
- Charles Potts (born 1943, US)
- Ezra Pound (1885–1972, US)
- B. W. Powe (born 1955, C)
- Craig Powell (born 1940, A)
- Winthrop Mackworth Praed (1802–1839, E)
- Claire Pratt (1921–1995, C)
- E. J. Pratt (1882–1964, C)
- Jack Prelutsky (born 1940, US)
- Karen Press (born 1956, SA)
- Thomas Preston (1537–1598, E)
- Ron Pretty (1940–2023, A)
- Frank Prewett (1893–1962, C)
- Nancy Price (1880–1970, E)
- Richard Price (born 1966, S/E)
- Robert Priest (born 1951, C)
- F. T. Prince (1912–2003, E)
- Thomas Pringle (1789–1834, S/SA)
- Matthew Prior (1664–1721, E)
- Pauline Prior-Pitt (living, S)
- Adelaide Anne Procter (1825–1864, E)
- Bryan Procter (1787–1874, E)
- Kevin Prufer (born 1969, US)
- J. H. Prynne (1936–2026, E)
- Sheenagh Pugh (born 1950, W/E)
- Al Purdy (1918–2000, C)

== Q ==
- Andy Quan (born 1969, C/A)
- Francis Quarles (1592–1644, E)
- Peter Quennell (1905–1993, E)
- Sina Queyras (living, C)
- Roderic Quinn (1867–1949, A)

== R ==
=== Ra–Ri ===
- William Radice (born 1951, E)
- Kenneth Radu (born 1945, C)
- Sam Ragan (1915–1996, US)
- Jennifer Rahim (born 1963, T)
- Craig Raine (born 1944, E)
- Kathleen Raine (1908–2003, US)
- Carl Rakosi (1903–2004, US)
- Walter Raleigh (1552 or 1554–1618, E)
- James Ralph (1705–1762, US/E)
- Raymond Ramcharitar (living, T)
- Lesego Rampolokeng (born 1965, S)
- Allan Ramsay (1686–1758, S)
- Theodore Harding Rand (1835–1900, C)
- Dudley Randall (1914–2000, US)
- Julia Randall (1924–2005, US)
- Thomas Randolph (1605–1635, E)
- Jennifer Rankin (1941–1979, A)
- Claudia Rankine (born 1963, J)
- John Crowe Ransom (1888–1974, US)
- Lennox Raphael (born 1939, J)
- Stephen Ratcliffe (born 1948, US)
- Angela Rawlings (born 1978, C)
- Tom Raworth (1938–2017, E)
- Herbert Read (1893–1968, E)
- Angela Readman (born 1973, E)
- James Reaney (1926–2008, C)
- George Reavey (1907–1976, Ir)
- Peter Redgrove (1932–2003, E)
- Michael Redhill (born 1966, C)
- Beatrice Redpath (1886–1937, C)
- Henry Reed (1914–1986, E)
- Ishmael Reed (born 1938, US)
- Jeremy Reed (born 1951, Je)
- Kerry Reed-Gilbert (1956–2019, A)
- Ennis Rees (1925–2009, US)
- Lizette Woodworth Reese (1856–1935, US)
- Deryn Rees-Jones (living, E/W)
- James Reeves (1909–1978, E)
- Nell Regan (born 1969, Ir)
- Alastair Reid (1926–2014, S)
- Christopher Reid (born 1949, E)
- D. C. Reid (born 1952, C)
- Jamie Reid (1941–2015, C)
- Azila Talit Reisenberger (living, SA)
- James Reiss (1941–2016, US)
- Joseph Relph (1712–1743, E)
- Robert Rendall (1898–1967, S)
- Kenneth Rexroth (1905–1982, US)
- Oliver Reynolds (born 1957, W)
- Charles Reznikoff (1894–1976, US)
- Shane Rhodes (living, C)
- Ernest Rhys (1859–1946, W/E)
- Henry Rice (1585 or 1586–1651, W/E)
- Stan Rice (1942–2002, US)
- Adrienne Rich (1929–2012, US)
- Dorothy Richardson (1873–1957, E)
- John Richardson (1817–1886, E)
- Robert Richardson (1850–1901, A)
- Edgell Rickword (1898–1982, E)
- Elizabeth Riddell (1910–1998, A)
- Lola Ridge (1873–1941, US)
- Laura Riding (1901–1991, US)
- Elijah Ridings (1802–1872)
- Anne Ridler (1912–2001, E)
- Denise Riley (born 1948, E)
- James Whitcomb Riley (1849–1916, US)
- John Riley (1937–1978, E)
- Peter Riley (born 1940, E)
- Mary Roberts Rinehart (1876–1958, US)
- Maurice Riordan (born 1953, Ir)
- Alberto Ríos (born 1952, US)

=== Ro–Ru ===
- E. M. Roach (Merton Maloney, 1915–1974, T)
- Charles G. D. Roberts (1860–1943, C)
- Emma Roberts (1794–1840, E)
- Michael Roberts (1902–1948, E)
- Edith Anne Robertson (1883–1973, S)
- James Robertson (born 1958, S)
- Lisa Robertson (born 1961, C)
- Robin Robertson (born 1955, S)
- Edwin Arlington Robinson (1869–1935, US)
- Lennox Robinson (1886–1958, Ir)
- Mary Robinson (1758–1800, E)
- Matt Robinson (born 1974, C)
- Roland Robinson (1912–1992, A)
- Ajmer Rode (living, C)
- Gordon Rodgers (born 1952, C)
- W. R. Rodgers (1909–1969, NI)
- Carmen Rodríguez (born 1948 Ch/C)
- Judith Rodriguez (1936–2018, A)
- Theodore Roethke (1908–1963, US)
- January Rogers (born 1963, C)
- Linda Rogers (born 1944, C)
- Samuel Rogers (1763–1855, E)
- Isabella Whiteford Rogerson (Isabella Whiteford, 1835–1905, Ir/C)
- Matthew Rohrer (born 1972, US)
- Mary Rolls (1775–1835, E)
- Ethel Rolt Wheeler (1869–1958, E)
- David Romtvedt (living, US)
- Dilys Rose (born 1954, S)
- Peter Rose (born 1955, A)
- Raymond Roseliep (1917–1983, US)
- Franklin Rosemont (1943–2009, US)
- Penelope Rosemont (born 1942, US)
- Isaac Rosenberg (1890–1918, E)
- Joe Rosenblatt (1933–2019, C)
- Gabriel Rosenstock (1949–2026, Ir)
- Laisha Rosnau (born 1972, C)
- Alan Ross (1922–2001, E)
- Bruce Ross (living, C)
- Stuart Ross (born 1959, C)
- W. W. E. Ross (1894–1966, C)
- Christina Rossetti (1830–1894, E)
- Dante Gabriel Rossetti (1828–1882, E)
- Jerome Rothenberg (1931–2024, US)
- Nancy-Gay Rotstein (living, C)
- Anne Rouse (born 1954, US/E)
- David Rowbotham (1924–2010, A)
- Elizabeth Singer Rowe (1674–1737, E)
- Nicholas Rowe (1674–1718, E)
- Noel Rowe (1951–2007, A)
- Stephen Rowe (born 1980, C)
- Graham Rowlands (born 1947, A)
- Richard Rowlands (1565–1630, E/Nt)
- Samuel Rowlands (c. 1573–1630, E)
- Rosemarie Rowley (born 1942, Ir)
- Susanna Rowson (1762–1824, E/US)
- Susanna Roxman (1946–2015, Sw)
- Adam Rudden (born 1983, Ir)
- Ellen Sergeant Rude (1838–1916, US)
- Muriel Rukeyser (1913–1980, US)
- Charlotte Runcie (born 1989, S)
- Jenny Terrill Ruprecht (1839–1916, US)
- George William Russell (1867–1935, Ir/E)
- Nipsey Russell (1918–2005, US)
- Brendan Ryan (born 1963, A)
- Gig Ryan (born 1956, A)
- Kay Ryan (born 1945, US)
- Michael Ryan (born 1946, US)
- Tracy Ryan (born 1964, A)
- Thomas Rymer (c. 1643–1713, E)

== S ==
=== Sa–Si ===
- Charles Sackville (1643–1706, E)
- Thomas Sackville (1536–1608, E)
- Vita Sackville-West (1892–1962, E)
- Benjamin Alire Sáenz (born 1954, US)
- Maria Grace Saffery (1773–1858, E)
- Lake Sagaris (born 1956, C/Ch)
- Nandini Sahu (born 1973, In)
- Albert Saijo (1926–2011, US)
- Arja Salafranca (born 1971, SA)
- Trish Salah (living, C)
- Nina Salaman (1877–1925, E)
- Blanaid Salkeld (1880–1959, Ir)
- Philip Salom (born 1950, A)
- John Salusbury (1567–1612, W/E)
- Thomas Salusbury (1612–1643, W/E)
- Fiona Sampson (born 1963, E)
- Sonia Sanchez (born 1934, US)
- Carl Sandburg (1878–1967, US)
- Peter Sanger (born 1943, C)
- Charles Sangster (1822–1893, C)
- Ann Sansom (living, E)
- Clive Sansom (1910–1981, E/A)
- Andrew Sant (born 1950, A)
- Robyn Sarah (born 1949, C)
- Jaydeep Sarangi (born 1973, India)
- Dipti Saravanamuttu (born 1960, A)
- May Sarton (1912–1995, US)
- Siegfried Sassoon (1886–1967, E)
- K. Satchidanandan (born 1948, In)
- Esther Saunders (1793–1862, US)
- Jen Saunders (born 1962, A)
- Richard Savage (c. 1697–1743, E)
- Jaya Savige (born 1978, A)
- Leslie Scalapino (1944–2010, US)
- Herman George Scheffauer (1876–1927, US)
- Jacob Scheier (born 1980, C)
- Libby Scheier (1946–2000, US/C)
- Bel Schenk (born 1975, A)
- Dennis Schmitz (1937–2019, US)
- Pat Schneider (1934–2020, US)
- Jane Johnston Schoolcraft (1800–1842, US)
- Andreas Schroeder (born 1946, C)
- Philip Schultz (born 1945, US)
- James Schuyler (1923–1991, US)
- Delmore Schwartz (1913–1966, US)
- Stephen Scobie (born 1943, C)
- Gregory Scofield (born 1966, C)
- Alexander Scott (c. 1520 – c. 1583, S)
- Alexander Scott (1920–1989, S)
- Dennis Scott (1939–1991, J)
- Duncan Campbell Scott (1862–1947, C)
- F. R. Scott (1899–1985, C)
- Frederick George Scott (1861–1944, C)
- Geoffrey Scott (1884–1929, E)
- John A. Scott (born 1948, A)
- Margaret Scott (1934–2005, A)
- Peter Dale Scott (born 1929, C)
- Tom Scott (1918–1995, S)
- Sir Walter Scott (1771–1832, S)
- William Bell Scott (1811–1890, S)
- Gil Scott-Heron (1949–2011, US)
- Ann Scott-Moncrieff (1914–1943, S)
- E. J. Scovell (1907–1999, E)
- Maurice Scully (1952–2023, Ir)
- George Bazeley Scurfield (1920–1991, E)
- Peter Seaton (1942–2010, US)
- Charles Sedley (1639–1701, E)
- Frederick Seidel (born 1936, US)
- Hugh Seidman (born 1940, US)
- Rebecca Seiferle (living, US)
- Lasana M. Sekou (born 1959, SM)
- Francis Sempill (c. 1616–1682, S)
- Robert Sempill (c. 1595 – c. 1663, S)
- Olive Senior (born 1941, J/C)
- Sipho Sepamla (1932–2007, SA)
- Mongane Wally Serote (born 1944, SA)
- Nina Serrano (born 1934, US)
- Robert W. Service (1874–1958, S/C)
- Vikram Seth (born 1952, SM)
- Elkanah Settle (1648–1724, E)
- Anna Seward (1742–1809, E)
- Anne Sexton (1928–1974, US)
- John W. Sexton (born 1958, Ir)
- Thomas Shadwell (1642–1692, E)
- Kathy Shaidle (born 1964, C)
- William Shakespeare (1564–1616, E)
- Tupac Shakur (1971–1996, US)
- Otep Shamaya (born 1979, US)
- Eileen Shanahan (1901–1979, Ir)
- Ntozake Shange (1948–2018, US)
- Edward Shanks (1892–1953, E)
- Jo Shapcott (born 1953, E)
- Thomas Shapcott (born 1935, A)
- Karl Shapiro (1913–2000, US)
- Michael Sharkey (born 1946, A)
- William Sharp (awa Fiona MacLeod, 1855–1905, S)
- Brenda Shaughnessy (born 1970, US)
- Luci Shaw (born 1928, E/US)
- Owen Sheers (born 1974, W/E)
- Percy Bysshe Shelley (1792–1822, E)
- William Shenstone (1714–1763, E)
- Nan Shepherd (1893–1981, S)
- Francis Joseph Sherman (1871–1926, C)
- Joseph Sherman (1945–2006, C)
- Kate Brownlee Sherwood (1841–1914, US)
- Carol Shields (1935–2003, US/C)
- Trish Shields (living, C)
- Thomas Shipman (1632–1680, E)
- James Shirley (1596–1666, E)
- Dora Adele Shoemaker (1873–1962, US)
- Fredegond Shove (1889–1949, E)
- Sandy Shreve (living, C)
- Penelope Shuttle (born 1947, E)
- Beau Sia (born 1976, US)
- Mary Sidney (1561–1621, E)
- Philip Sidney (1554–1586, E)
- Melanie Siebert (living, C)
- Eli Siegel (1902–1978, US)
- Robert Siegel (1939–2012, US)
- Jon Silkin (1930–1997, E)
- Hilda Siller (1861–1945, US)
- Ron Silliman (born 1946, US)
- Shel Silverstein (1930–1999, US)
- Charles Simic (1938–2023, US)
- Goran Simić (born 1952, Bo/C)
- Bren Simmers (born 1976, C)
- James Simmons (1933–2001, NI)
- Anne Simpson (born 1956, C)
- Louis Simpson (1923–2012, J/US)
- Matt Simpson (1936–2009, E)
- R. A. Simpson (1929–2002, A)
- Bennie Lee Sinclair (1939–2000, US)
- Iain Sinclair (born 1943, W/E)
- May Sinclair (1863–1946, E)
- Sue Sinclair (living, C)
- Tim Sinclair (born 1972, A)
- Burns Singer (1928–1964, S)
- Marilyn Singer (born 1948, US)
- Sarah Singleton (born 1966, E)
- George Sipos (living, C)
- Peter Sirr (born 1960, Ir)
- Lemn Sissay (born 1967, E)
- C. H. Sisson (1914–2003, E)
- Ari Sitas (born 1952, SA)
- Edith Sitwell (1887–1964, E)
- Osbert Sitwell (1892–1969, E)
- Sacheverell Sitwell (1897–1988, E)

=== Sk–Sq ===
- Sonja Skarstedt (1960–2009, C)
- John Skelton (1460–1529, E)
- Robin Skelton (1925–1997, E/C)
- Douglas Reid Skinner (born 1949, SA)
- Myra Sklarew (born 1934, US)
- Ed Skoog (born 1971, US)
- Zoë Skoulding (born 1967, W)
- Peter Skrzynecki (born 1945, A)
- Kenneth Slessor (1901–1971, A)
- Daniel Sloate (1931–2009, C)
- Edward Slow (1841–1925, E)
- Adam Small (1936–2016, SA)
- Carolyn Smart (born 1952, C)
- Christopher Smart (1722–1771, E)
- Elizabeth Smart (1913–1986, C)
- A. J. M. Smith (1902–1980, C)
- Alexander Smith (1830–1867, S)
- Bruce Smith (born 1946, US)
- Charlotte Turner Smith (1749–1806, E)
- Clara Kathleen Smith (1911–2004, C)
- Clark Ashton Smith (1893–1961, US)
- Douglas Burnet Smith (born 1949, C)
- Iain Crichton Smith (1928–1998, S)
- John Smith (1927–2018, C)
- Malachi Smith (living, J)
- Marc Smith (born 1949, US)
- Margaret Smith (born 1958, US)
- Michael Smith (1942–2014, Ir)
- Michael V. Smith (living, C)
- Patti Smith (born 1946, US)
- Rod Smith (born 1962, US)
- Ron Smith (born 1943, C)
- Steven Ross Smith (born 1945, C)
- Stevie Smith (1902–1971, E)
- Sydney Goodsir Smith (1915–1975, S)
- Tracy K. Smith (born 1972, US)
- Vivian Smith (born 1933, A)
- William Jay Smith (1918–2015, US)
- Tobias Smollett (1721–1771, S)
- W. D. Snodgrass (1925–2009, US)
- Gary Snyder (born 1930, US)
- Karen Solie (born 1966, C)
- David Solway (born 1941, C)
- William Somervile (1675–1742, E)
- Cathy Song (born 1955, US)
- Madeline Sonik (born 1960, C)
- Edward Sorenson (1869–1939, A)
- Charles Sorley (1895–1915, S)
- Gary Soto (born 1952, US)
- Carolyn Marie Souaid (born 1959, C)
- Raymond Souster (1921–2012, C)
- William Soutar (1898–1946, S)
- Caroline Anne Southey (1786–1854, E)
- Robert Southey (1774–1843, E)
- Robert Southwell (1561–1595, E)
- Wole Soyinka (born 1934, Ni)
- Esta Spalding (living, US/C)
- Heather Spears (1934–2021, C/De)
- Alan Spence (living, S)
- Lewis Spence (1874–1955, S)
- Anne Spencer (1882–1975, US)
- Bernard Spencer (1909–1963, E)
- Thomas Edward Spencer (1845–1911, A)
- Stephen Spender (1909–1995, E)
- Edmund Spenser (1552–1599, E)
- Leonora Speyer (1872–1956, US)
- Harriet Elizabeth Prescott Spofford (1835–1921, US)
- Eintou Pearl Springer (born 1944, T)
- Birk Sproxton (1943–2007, C)
- J. C. Squire (1884–1958, E)
- Geoffrey Squires (born 1942, NI)

=== St–Sy ===
- William Stafford (1914–1993, US)
- A. E. Stallings (born 1968, US)
- Jon Stallworthy (1935–2014, E)
- Ann Stanford (1916–1987, US)
- Frank Stanford (1948–1978, US)
- George Stanley (born 1937, US/C)
- George Starbuck (1931–1996, US)
- Carmine Starnino (born 1970, C)
- Nicolette Stasko (born 1950, A)
- C. K. Stead (born 1932, NZ)
- Peter Steele (1939–2012, A)
- Richard Steere (1643–1721, US)
- John Steffler (born 1947, C)
- Gertrude Stein (1874–1946, US)
- Mattie Stepanek (1990–2004, US)
- Ian Stephens (1955–1996, C)
- James Stephens (1880–1950, Ir)
- James Brunton Stephens (1835–1902, S)
- George Stepney (1663–1707, E)
- John Sterling (1806–1844, S)
- Gerald Stern (1925–2022, US)
- Ricardo Sternberg (born 1948, C/US)
- C. J. Stevens (1927–2021, US)
- Wallace Stevens (1880–1955, US)
- Richard Stevenson (born 1952, C)
- Robert Louis Stevenson (1850–1894, S)
- Margo Taft Stever (living, US)
- Amanda Stewart (born 1959, A)
- Douglas Stewart (1913–1985, A)
- Harold Stewart (1916–1995, A)
- Shannon Stewart (living, C)
- W. Gregory Stewart (living, C/US)
- Trumbull Stickney (1874–1904, US)
- John Stiles (living, C/E)
- James Still (1906–2001, US)
- Anne Stone (living, C)
- Donna J. Stone (1933–1994, US)
- Ruth Stone (1915–2011, US)
- Lisa Gluskin Stonestreet (born 1968, US)
- Edward Storer (1880–1944, E)
- Randolph Stow (1935–2010, A)
- Mark Strand (1934–2014, US)
- Jennifer Strauss (born 1933, A)
- Sean Street (born 1946, E)
- Agnes Strickland (1796–1874, E)
- Adelle Stripe (born 1976, E)
- Trumbull Stickney (1874–1904, US)
- Donna J. Stone (1933–1994, US)
- Billy Marshall Stoneking (1947–2016, A)
- Lisa Gluskin Stonestreet (born 1968, US)
- Edward Storer (1880–1944, E)
- Eithne Strong (1923–1999, Ir)
- Joseph Stroud (born 1943, US)
- Betsy Struthers (born 1951, C)
- John Struthers (1776–1853, S)
- Jesse Stuart (1906–1984, US)
- Abhi Subedi (born 1945)
- John Suckling (1609–1642, E)
- Julie Suk (1924–2025, US)
- Andrew Suknaski (1942–2012, C)
- Alan Sullivan (1868–1947, C)
- Aloysius Michael Sullivan (1896–1980, US)
- Rosemary Sullivan (born 1947, C)
- Maud Sulter (1960–2008, S)
- Moez Surani (born 1979, C)
- Kamala Surayya (1934–2009, In)
- Efua Sutherland (1924–1996, Gh)
- John Sutherland (1919–1956, C)
- Robert Swanson (1905–1994, C)
- Robert Sward (1933–2022, US/C)
- George Swede (born 1940, C)
- Matthew Sweeney (1951–2018, Ir)
- Cole Swensen (born 1955, US)
- Karen Swenson (born 1936, US)
- May Swenson (1913–1989, US)
- Jonathan Swift (1667–1745, Ir/E)
- Todd Swift (born 1966, C/E)
- Algernon Charles Swinburne (1837–1909, E)
- Randall Swingler (1909–1967, E)
- Ieuan ap Hywel Swrdwal (c. 1430 – c. 1480, W)
- Bobbi Sykes (1943–2010, A)
- Joshua Sylvester (1563–1618, E)
- Arthur Symons (1865–1945, E)
- John Millington Synge (1871–1909, Ir)
- Arthur Sze (born 1950, US)
- George Szirtes (born 1948, E)
- Anne Szumigalski (1922–1999, E/C)

== T ==
- Eileen Tabios (born 1960, US)
- Proma Tagore (living, C)
- Rabindranath Tagore (1861–1941, In)
- Maria Takolander (born 1973, A)
- Ronald Phillip Tanaka (1944–2007, US)
- Francis W. Tancred (1874–1925, E)
- Robert Tannahill (1774–1810, S)
- Dorothea Tanning (1910–2012, US)
- Allen Tate (1899–1979, US)
- James Tate (1943–2015, US)
- Emma Tatham (1829–1855, E)
- Andrew Taylor (born 1940, A)
- Ann Taylor (1782–1866, E)
- Bruce Taylor (born 1960, C)
- Edward Taylor (1645–1729, E/US)
- Emily Taylor (1795–1872, E)
- Heather Taylor (living, C)
- Henry Taylor (1800–1886, E)
- Henry S. Taylor (born 1942, US)
- Jane Taylor (1783–1824, E)
- Rachel Annand Taylor (1876–1960, S)
- Ruth Taylor (1961–2006, C)
- Sara Teasdale (1883–1933, US)
- Barry Tebb (born 1942, E)
- Fiona Templeton (born 1951, S/E)
- William Tennant (1784–1848, S)
- Alfred, Lord Tennyson (1809–1892, E)
- Frederick Tennyson (1807–1898, E)
- John Terpstra (living, C)
- Elaine Terranova (born 1939, US)
- A. S. J. Tessimond (1902–1962, E)
- Lucy Terry (c. 1730–1821, US)
- Souvankham Thammavongsa (born 1978, C)
- Celia Thaxter (1824–1894, US)
- Ernest Thayer (1863–1940, US)
- John Thelwall (1764–1834, E)
- Sharon Thesen (born 1946, C)
- Colin Thiele (1920–2006, A)
- Kai Cheng Thom (living, C)
- William Thom (1799–1848, S)
- Thomas the Rhymer (Thomas Learmonth, c. 1220 – c. 1298, S)
- Thomas of Hales (13th c., E)
- D. M. Thomas (1935–2023, E)
- Dylan Thomas (1914–1953, W/E)
- Edward Thomas (1878–1917, E)
- Elizabeth Thomas (1675–1731, E)
- Lorenzo Thomas (1944–2005, US)
- R. S. Thomas (1913–2000, W)
- William Thomas (1832–1878, W)
- Francis Thompson (1859–1907, E)
- John Thompson (1938–1976, E/C)
- John Reuben Thompson (1823–1873, US)
- Edward William Thomson (1849–1924, C)
- James Thomson (1700–1748, S)
- James Thomson (awa Bysshe Vanolis, 1834–1882, S)
- Henry David Thoreau (1817–1862, US)
- Tim Thorne (1944–2021, A)
- Russell Thornton (living, C)
- Joseph Thurston (1704–1732, E)
- Anthony Thwaite (1930–2021, E)
- Michael Thwaites (1915–2005, A)
- Chidiock Tichborne (1558–1586, E)
- Thomas Tickell (1685–1740, E)
- Matthew Tierney (born 1970, C)
- Mary Tighe (1772–1810, Ir)
- Lydia H. Tilton (1839–1915, US)
- Richard Tipping (born 1949, A)
- José Tlatelpas (born 1953, Me/C)
- Nick Toczek (born 1950, E)
- Barbara Euphan Todd (1890–1976, E)
- Ruthven Todd (1914–1978, S)
- Mohamud Siad Togane (born 1947, So/C)
- J. R. R. Tolkien (1892–1973, E)
- Beatrix Lucia Catherine Tollemache (1840–1926, E)
- Francis Tolson (died 1745, E)
- Melvin B. Tolson (1898–1966, US)
- Charles Tomlinson (1927–2015, E)
- Jean Toomer (1894–1967, US)
- Charles Tompson (1807–1883, A)
- Angela Topping (born 1954, E)
- Lola Lemire Tostevin (born 1937, C)
- Cyril Tourneur (died 1626, E)
- Ann Townsend (born 1962, US)
- Thomas Traherne (1636/1637–1674, E)
- John Tranter (1943–2023, A)
- Elizabeth Treadwell (born 1967, US)
- Mark Tredinnick (born 1962, A)
- Rhea Tregebov (born 1953, C)
- Raymond D. Tremblay (living, C)
- Roland Michel Tremblay (born 1972, C/E)
- Natasha Trethewey (born 1966, US)
- Tony Trigilio (born 1966, US)
- Calvin Trillin (born 1935, US)
- David Trinidad (born 1953, US)
- John Tripp (1927–1986, W/E)
- Quincy Troupe (born 1939, US)
- Peter Trower (1930–2017, C)
- Mark Truscott (born 1970, US/C)
- Dimitris Tsaloumas (1921–2016, A)
- Charlotte Maria Tucker (A.L.O.E, 1821–1893, E)
- Eliza Dorothea Cobbe, Lady Tuite (c. 1764–1850, Ir)
- George Turberville (c. 1540 – before 1597, E)
- Richard Marggraf Turley (born 1970, E)
- Gael Turnbull (1928–2004, S)
- Charles Tennyson Turner (1808–1879, E)
- Julian Turner (born 1955, E)
- Walter J. Turner (1889–1946, A/E)
- Thomas Tusser (1524–1580, E)
- Emma Rood Tuttle (1839–1916, US)
- Hone Tuwhare (1922–2008, NZ)
- Violet Tweedale (1862–1936, S/E)
- Chase Twichell (born 1950, US)
- Katharine Tynan (1859–1932, Ir/E)
- John Tyndall (born 1951, C)
- Daniel Scott Tysdal (born 1978, C)

== U ==
- Laura Ulewicz (1930–2007, US)
- Jean Starr Untermeyer (1886–1970, US)
- Louis Untermeyer (1885–1977, US)
- John Updike (1932–2009, US)
- Priscila Uppal (1974–2018, C)
- Allen Upward (1863–1926, E)
- Joan Ure (Elizabeth Thoms Clark, 1918–1978, S)
- David UU (David W. Harris, 1948–1994, C)
- Amy Uyematsu (1947–2023, US)

== V ==
- Jean Valentine (1934–2020, US)
- Valentine Vallis (1916–2009, A)
- Cor van den Heuvel (born 1931, US)
- Mona Van Duyn (1921–2004, US)
- Lin Van Hek (born 1944, A)
- Peter van Toorn (1944–2021, C)
- Christopher van Wyk (1957–2014, SA)
- Henry Vaughan (1621–1695, W)
- R. M. Vaughan (born 1965, C)
- Thomas Vaux, 2nd Baron Vaux of Harrowden (1509–1556, E)
- Reetika Vazirani (1962–2003, US)
- Janine Pommy Vega (1942–2010, US)
- Edward Vere, Earl of Oxford (1550–1604, E)
- Helen Vendler (1933–2024, US)
- Jumoke Verissimo (born 1976, Ni)
- Paul Vermeersch (born 1973, C)
- Katherena Vermette (born 1977, C)
- Jones Very (1813–1880, US)
- Vicki Viidikas (1948–1998, A)
- Peter Viereck (1916–2006, US)
- José García Villa (1908–1997, Ph)
- Pamelia Sarah Vining (1826–1897, C)
- Vivian Virtue (1911–1998, J/E)
- Garth Von Buchholz (living, C)
- Brian Vrepont (1882–1955, A)
- Prvoslav Vujcic (Prvoslav Vujčić, born 1960, Se/C)

== W ==
=== Wa–We ===
- Miriam Waddington (1917–2004, C)
- Michael Wade (1944–2004, C)
- Sidney Wade (born 1951, US)
- Fred Wah (born 1939, C)
- John Wain (1925–1994, E)
- A. E. Waite (1857–1942, E)
- Nayyirah Waheed (living, US)
- Diane Wakoski (born 1937, US)
- Derek Walcott (1930–2017, SL)
- Anne Waldman (born 1945, US)
- George Waldron (1690 – c. 1730, E/IoM)
- Keith Waldrop (1932–2023, US)
- Rosmarie Waldrop (born 1935, US)
- Arthur Waley (1889–1966, E)
- Alice Walker (born 1944, US)
- Margaret Walker (1915–1998, US)
- Rob Walker (born 1953, A)
- Bronwen Wallace (1945–1989, C)
- Chris Wallace-Crabbe (1934–2025, A)
- Edmund Waller (1606–1687, E)
- Tom Walmsley (born 1948, C)
- Agnes Walsh (born 1950, C)
- Catherine Walsh (born 1964, Ir)
- Minnie Gow Walsworth (1859–1947, US)
- David Waltner-Toews (born 1948, C)
- Ania Walwicz (1951–2020, A)
- Connie Wanek (born 1952, US)
- John Powell Ward (born 1937, E/W)
- Ned Ward (1667–1731, E)
- Sarah Wardle (born 1969, E)
- Anna Laetitia Waring (1823–1910, W/E)
- Emily Warn (living, US)
- Sylvia Townsend Warner (1893–1978, E)
- Crystal Warren (living, SA)
- John Warren, 3rd Baron de Tabley (1835–1895, E)
- Meralda Warren (born 1959, PI)
- Robert Penn Warren (1905–1989, US)
- Thomas Warton (1728–1790, E)
- Terry Watada (born 1951, C)
- Vernon Watkins (1906–1967, W)
- George Watsky (born 1986, US)
- Rosamund Marriott Watson (Graham R. Tomson, 1860–1911, E)
- Samuel Wagan Watson (born 1972, A)
- Stephen Watson (1954–2011, SA)
- Thomas Watson (1555–1592, E)
- William Watson (1858–1935, E)
- Alison Watt (born 1957, C)
- Barrett Watten (born 1948, US)
- Isaac Watts (1674–1748, E)
- Rebecca Watts (born 1983, E)
- Theodore Watts-Dunton (1832–1914, E)
- Tom Wayman (born 1945, C)
- Alan Wearne (born 1948, A)
- Francis Webb (1925–1973, A)
- Harri Webb (1920–1994, W)
- Phyllis Webb (1927–2021, C)
- John Webster (c. 1580 – c. 1634, E)
- Mary Morison Webster (1894–1980, SA)
- James Wedderburn (c. 1495–1553, S)
- John Wedderburn (c. 1505–1553, S)
- Robert Wedderburn (c. 1510 – c. 1555, S)
- Rebecca Wee (living, US)
- George Weideman (1947–2008, SA)
- John Weier (born 1949, C)
- Hannah Weiner (1928–1997, US)
- Robert Stanley Weir (1856–1926, C)
- Marjorie Welish (born 1944, US)
- Zachariah Wells (born 1976, C)
- Viola S. Wendt (1907–1986, US)
- Marjory Heath Wentworth (born 1958, US)
- William Wentworth (1790–1872, A)
- Darren Wershler (Darren Wershler-Henry, born 1966, C)
- Charles Wesley (1707–1788, E)
- Gilbert West (1703–1756, E)
- Jane West (1758–1852, E)
- David Wevill (born 1935, C/US)

=== Wh–Wy ===
- Philip Whalen (1923–2002, US)
- Dawud Wharnsby (born 1972, C)
- Anne Wharton (1659–1685, E)
- Gordon Wharton (1929–2011, E)
- Herb Wharton (born 1936, A)
- Mary Whateley (1738–1835, E)
- Anne Wheathill (fl. 1584, E)
- David Wheatley (born 1970, Ir/S)
- Phillis Wheatley (1753–1784, US)
- Billy Edd Wheeler (born 1932, US)
- E. B. White (1899–1985, US)
- Henry Kirke White (1785–1806, E)
- James L. White (1936–1981, US)
- Kenneth White (1936–2023, S)
- Laura Rosamond White (1844–1922, US)
- Joshua Whitehead (living, C)
- Bruce Whiteman (born 1952, C)
- Walt Whitman (1819–1892, US)
- Isabella Whitney (c. 1546/1548 – after 1624, E)
- Zoe Whittall (born 1976, C)
- Reed Whittemore (1919–2012, US)
- John Greenleaf Whittier (1807–1892, US)
- Brian Whittingham (1950–2022, S)
- Christopher Whyte (born 1952, S)
- George Whyte-Melville (1821–1878, S/E)
- Anna Wickham (1883–1947, E/A)
- Les Wicks (born 1955, A)
- John Wieners (1934–2002, US)
- Nissanka Wijeyeratne (1924–2007, SLa)
- Richard Wilbur (1921–2017, US)
- Dora Wilcox (1873–1953, A)
- Ella Wheeler Wilcox (1850–1919, US)
- Robert Will (1615–1679, E)
- Jane Wilde (1821–1896, Ir/E)
- Oscar Wilde (1854–1900, Ir/E)
- Amos Wilder (1895–1993, US)
- Charlotte Wilder (1898–1980, US)
- Anne Wilkinson (1910–1961, C)
- John Wilkinson (born 1953, E)
- William of Nassyngton (died 1354, E)
- William of Shoreham (fl. 14th century, E)
- Aeneas Francon Williams (1886–1971, E)
- Alfred Williams (1877–1930, E)
- Anna Williams (1706–1783, W/E)
- Athol Williams (born 1970, SA)
- C. K. Williams (1936–2015, US)
- David Gwyn Williams (1904–1990, W/E)
- Donna Williams (1963–2017, A)
- Emmett Williams (1925–2007, US)
- Heathcote Williams (1941–2017, E)
- Helen Maria Williams (1759/1762–1827, E/F)
- Hugo Williams (born 1942, E)
- Isaac Williams (1802–1865, E)
- Jane Williams (1806–1885, W/E)
- Jonathan Williams (1929–2008, US)
- Miller Williams (1930–2015, US)
- Oscar Williams (1900–1964, US)
- Richard D'Alton Williams (1822–1862, Ir)
- Rowan Williams (born 1950, W/E)
- Saul Williams (born 1972, US)
- Sherley Anne Williams (1944–1999, US)
- William Carlos Williams (1883–1963, US)
- Frank S. Williamson (1865–1936, A)
- Elizabeth Willis (born 1961, US)
- James Wills (1790–1868, Ir)
- Ruth Wills (1826–1908, E)
- Clive Wilmer (1945–2025, E)
- Frank Wilmot (Furnley Maurice, 1881–1942, A)
- John Wilmot, 2nd Earl of Rochester (1647–1680, E)
- Eleanor Wilner (born 1937, US)
- Alan R. Wilson (living, C)
- Anne Elizabeth Wilson (1901–1946, US/C)
- Arthur Wilson (1595–1652, E)
- Dede Wilson (born 1937, US)
- Edwin Wilson (born 1942, A)
- Florence Mary Wilson (c. 1870–1946, Ir/NI)
- Peter Lamborn Wilson (also Hakim Bey, 1945–2022, US)
- Sheri-D Wilson (living, C)
- Christian Wiman (born 1966, US)
- Liz Winfield (born 1964, A)
- Rob Winger (born 1974, C)
- Sheila Wingfield (1906–1992, E/Ir)
- Yvor Winters (1900–1968, US)
- Jane Wiseman (Mrs. Holt, 1673 – after 1717, E)
- George Wither (1588–1667, E)
- Charles Wolfe (1791–1823, Ir)
- Humbert Wolfe (1885–1940, E)
- Thomas Wolfe (1900–1938, US)
- Theresa Wolfwood (living, C)
- Jennifer Wong (living, HK)
- Nellie Wong (born 1934, US)
- Gwyneth Barber Wood (died 2006, J)
- George Woodcock (1912–1995, C)
- Gregory Woods (born 1953, E)
- Joseph Woods (born 1966, Ir/Z)
- Macdara Woods (1942–2018, Ir)
- Lance Woolaver (born 1948, C)
- Dorothy Wordsworth (1771–1855, E)
- William Wordsworth (1770–1850, E)
- Philip Stanhope Worsley (1835–1866, E)
- Sir Henry Wotton (1568–1639, E)
- Carolyn D. Wright (1949–2016, US)
- Carolyne Wright (born 1949, US)
- Charles Wright (born 1935, US)
- David Wright (1920–1994, E)
- David McKee Wright (1869–1928, NZ/A)
- Franz Wright (1953–2015, US)
- James Wright (1927–1980, US)
- Jay Wright (born 1935, US)
- Judith Wright (1915–2000, A)
- Kirby Wright (living, US)
- Luke Wright (born 1982, E)
- Robert Wrigley (born 1951, US)
- Lady Mary Wroth (1587–1651 or 1653)
- Thomas Wyatt (1503–1542, E)
- Elinor Wylie (1885–1928, US)
- Edward Alexander Wyon (1842–1872, E)

== X–Y ==
- Makhosazana Xaba (born 1957, SA)
- Mitsuye Yamada (born 1923, US)
- Leo Yankevich (1961–2018, US)
- Morgan Yasbincek (born 1964, A)
- J. Michael Yates (1938–2021, US/C)
- W. B. Yeats (1865–1939, Ir)
- Jean Yoon (born 1962, C)
- Marly Youmans (born 1953, US)
- Monica Youn (born 1971, US)
- Andrew Young (1885–1971, S)
- Augustus Young (born 1943, Ir)
- d'bi Young (born 1977, J/C)
- Douglas Young (1913–1973, S)
- Edward Young (1683–1765, E)
- Ellen Young (c. 1810–1872, A)
- Ian Young (born 1945, C)
- Kevin Young (born 1970, US)
- Marguerite Young (1908–1995, US)

== Z ==
- Matthew Zapruder (born 1967, US)
- Marya Zaturenska (1902–1982, US)
- Robert Zend (1929–1985, C)
- Benjamin Zephaniah (1958–2023, E)
- Komninos Zervos (born 1950, A)
- David Zieroth (born 1946, C)
- Rachel Zolf (born 1968, C)
- Daniel Zomparelli (living, C)
- Carolyn Zonailo (born 1947, C)
- Louis Zukofsky (1904–1978, US)
- Fay Zwicky (1933–2017, A)
- Jan Zwicky (born 1955, C)

== Lists of English language poets by nationality ==
- List of Australian poets
- List of Canadian poets
- List of Irish poets
- List of English poets from India
- List of Nigerian poets
- List of South African poets
- List of poets from the United States

== See also ==
- English poetry
- List of poets
- List of women poets
