= Edmund Elviden =

- Occupation: Poet
- Writing career
- Period: Tudor period
- Genre: Poetry

Edmund Elviden (fl. 1570), was an English poet.

== Works ==
Elviden was the author of three poetical works of extreme rarity: A Neweyere's gift to the Rebellious Persons in the North partes of England, The Closit of Counsells, conteining the advyse of Divers Wyse Philosophers touchinge sundrye morall matters in Poesies, Preceptes, Prouerbes, and Parables, translated and collected out of divers aucthours into English verse, and The most excellent and pleasant Metaphoricall History of Pesistratus and Catanea. The only known copy of the latter work, which was quoted by Henry Todd in his edition of John Milton, was in the library of the Earl of Ellesmere.

Of Elviden's personal history nothing is known. From the closing lines of his Neweyere's Gift, "This wrote your frende, a wyshynge frende/Unto his natyve soil," it would seem that he was a north-countryman.
