= Dunstan Gale =

English poet

Dunstan Gale (fl. 1596) was an English poet.

Gale was the author of a poem entitled Pyramus and Thisbe, supposed to have been printed for the first time in 1597, as the dedication is addressed "To the Worshipful his verie friend D. B. H. Nov. 25th, 1596". It was published with Greene's History of Arbasto in 1617, in the title of which it is spoken of as "a lovely poem".
