= Badilisha Poetry X-Change =

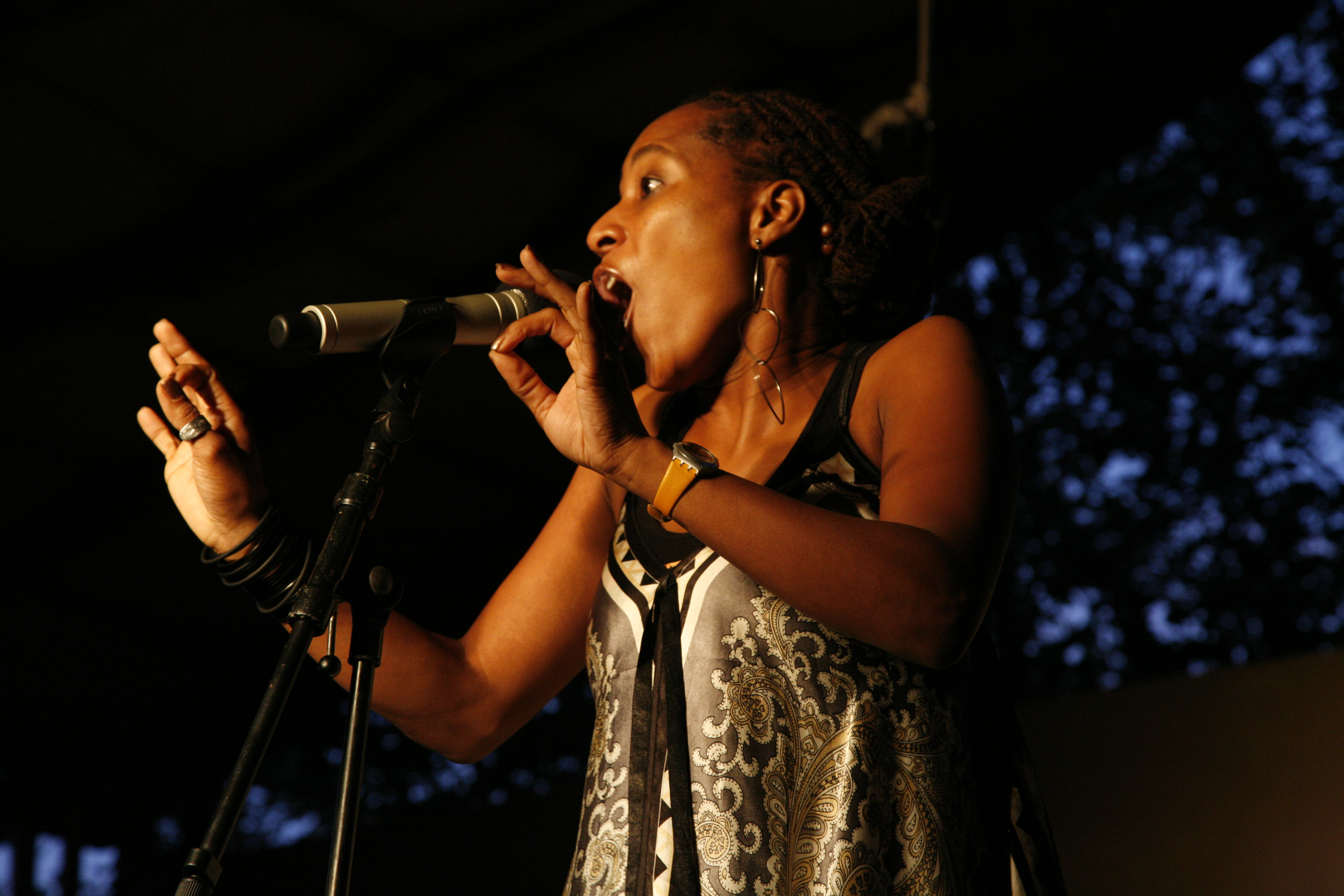
Badilisha Poetry X-Change 2008

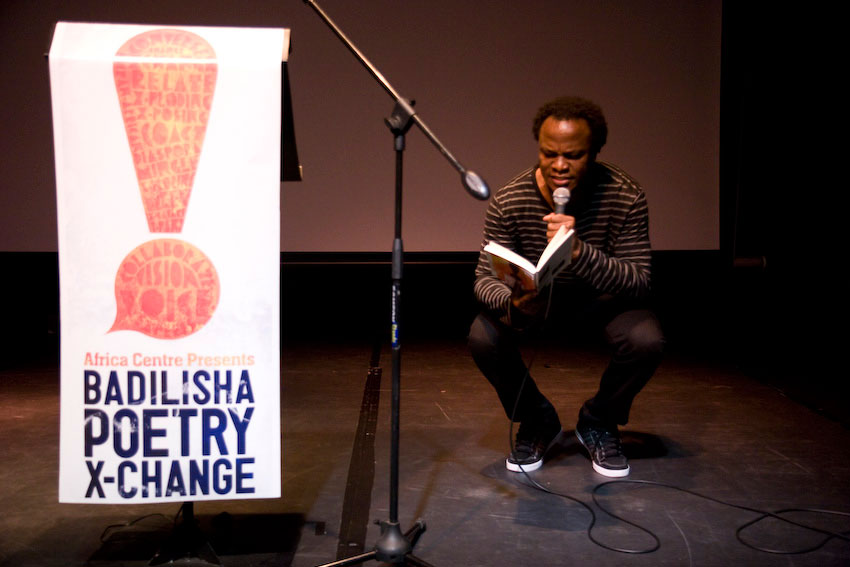
Badilisha Poetry X-Change 2009

Badilisha Poetry X-Change is a platform dedicated to showcasing poetry from Africa and the African Diaspora. The project came out of recognising the lack of documentation of African poets, on the African continent and in the rest of the world. Its aims are to fill this void as well as create a comprehensive global archive of Pan-African poets that can accessed internationally. First launched in 2008 as a poetry festival, the Spier Poetry Exchange. by nonprofit organisation Africa Centre in Cape Town, the festival centred on various aspects of developing, celebrating, archiving and documenting poetry and voices. In 2009, the Spier Poetry Exchange changed to the Badilisha Poetry X-Change (taking its name from the kiSwahili expression "Badilisha", which means to change, exchange and transform). Although different in name, Badilisha Poetry X-Change continues the "exchange" between poets, creating spaces and platforms for programmed poetry interventions, workshops and presentations. Its existence continues to provide new and established Pan-African voices a space of celebration, documentation, proliferation, and self-reflection.

== Badilisha Poetry X-Change Live ==
Based in Cape Town, South Africa, Badilisha Poetry X-Change Live is the physical manifestation of Badilisha. Events in the past have included week-long poetry interventions that showcase poets from the African Continent and its Diaspora. Each live intervention has focused on expanding performance poetry beyond entertainment into a medium for social activism, through workshops, seminars and masterclasses. Badilisha Live has had three poetry festivals, each featuring a line-up of poets from Africa and its Diaspora. Past festivals have featured D'bi Young, Kwame Dawes, Anis Mojgani, Ngoma Hill, Aryan Kaganof, Warsan Shire, Lemn Sissay, Emile Jansen, Phillippa Yaa de Villiers, Megan Hall and Dorothea Smartt.

In 2010, Badilisha Poetry X-Change expanded beyond its geographical boundaries into the online radio platform Badilisha Poetry Radio. Badilisha Poetry Radio is a poetry podcast platform that is dedicated to poets of Africa and the Diaspora. It showcases a range of voices from across the continent. Many artists are activist that use poetry as their art form.

== Badilisha Poetry Radio ==
Badilisha Poetry Radio, which launched on 30 April 2010, presents new voices and poetic genres. Currently there are more than 300 poets featured. This is dedicated to podcasting poets from Africa and the Diaspora. Each week the curator uploads poets of diverse styles, genre and topics from different corners of the globe. Poets can submit their work electronically via the website. The podcasts are available on Badilisha Poetry Radio and iTunes and can be downloaded. Podcast example: Mbali Kgosidintsi

=== Artists ===
List of poets on Badilisha Poetry:

- Afurakan (South Africa)
- Abdourahman A. Waberi (Djibouti)
- African Noise Foundation (South Africa)
- Ameera Patel (South Africa)
- Amir Sulaiman (USA)
- Andrea Nomasebe Dondolo (South Africa)
- Anis Mojgani (USA)
- Christopher Mwashinga (Tanzania)
- Annelie De Wet (South Africa)
- Annie Moyo (Zimbabwe)
- Anthony Joseph (Trinidad & Tobago)
- Antjie Krog (South Africa)
- Ari Sitas (South Africa)
- Aryan Kaganof (South Africa)
- Avaez Mohammad (United Kingdom)
- Bassey Ikpi (USA/Nigeria)
- Ben Caesar (Dominica)
- Bethel C. Simeon (Nigeria)
- Blackheat (Zimbabwe)
- Blaq Pearl (South Africa)
- Boonaa Mohammed (Canada/Ethiopia)
- Breyten Breytenbach (South Africa)
- Bulelwa Basse (South Africa)
- Camille T. Dungy (USA)
- Changa Hickinson (Netherlands Antilles)
- Chantel-Fleur Sandjon (Germany/Cameroon)
- Chenjerai Hove (Zimbabwe)
- Chiedu Ifeozo (Nigeria)
- Cornelius Eady (USA)
- Cosmas Mairosi (Zimbabwe)
- croc E moses (South Africa)
- Dawn Garisch (South Africa)
- d'bi young (Canada/Jamaica)
- DéLana Dameron (USA)
- Diana Ferrus (South Africa)
- Dorothea Smartt (UK/Barbados)
- Epiphanie Mukasano (Rwanda)
- Eric Miyeni (South Africa)
- Ernestine Deane (South Africa)
- Ewok (South Africa)
- Gabeba Baderoon (South Africa)
- Gcina Mhlophe (South Africa)
- Genna Gardini (South Africa)
- Gert Vlok Nel (South Africa)
- Gus Ferguson (South Africa)
- Hale Tsehlana (Lesotho)
- Helen Moffett (South Africa)
- Imani Woomera (Hawaii/Kenya)
- Inua Ellams (UK/Nigeria)
- Isabella Motadinyane (South Africa)
- Jacob Oketch (Kenya)
- Jacqueline "pretty poet" Kibacha (Tanzania)
- Jacques Coetzee (South Africa)
- Jamala Safari (Democratic Republic of Congo)
- James Matthews (South Africa)
- Jessica Mbangeni (South Africa)
- Jethro Louw (South Africa)
- Jimmy Rage (The Netherlands)
- Jitsvinger (South Africa)
- Julian Curry (USA/Bahamas)
- Kai Lossgott (Germany/South Africa)
- Karin Schimke (South Africa)
- Kayo Chingonyi (United Kingdom/Zambia)
- Kelwyn Sole (South Africa)
- Kenneth Ibegwam (Nigeria)
- Khadija Heeger (South Africa)
- Khadijah Ibrahim (United Kingdom/Jamaica)
- kokumo (United Kingdom/Jamaica)
- Kolade Arogundade (Nigeria)
- Kwame Dawes (Ghana)
- Lebogang Mashile(South Africa)
- Lemn Sissay (United Kingdom/Ethiopia)
- Liesl Jobson (South Africa)
- Lloyd Akin Palmer (Jamaica)
- Loftus Marais (South Africa)
- Mariahadessa Ekere Tallie (USA)
- Mark Espin (South Africa)
- Mbali Kgosidintsi (South Africa)
- Mbali Vilakazi (South Africa)
- Megan Hall (South Africa)
- Michael Mabwe (Zimbabwe)
- The Mighty Third Rail (USA)
- Mojisola Adebayo (Nigeria/Danemark)
- Moses Serubiri (Uganda)
- Mpho Ya Badimo (South Africa)
- Muhammad Muwakil (Trinidad & Tobago)
- Mukoma Wa Ngugi (Kenya)
- Musa Okwonga (Uganda)
- Mwalim Morgan Peters (Wampanoag/USA)
- Mwila Mambwe (Democratic Republic of Congo)
- Naima Mclean (South Africa)
- Napo Masheane (South Africa)
- Natalia Molebatsi (South Africa)
- Natasha Tafari (South Africa)
- Ngoma Hill (USA/Nigeria)
- Ngwatilo Mawiyoo (Kenya)
- Olumide Popoola (Germany/Nigeria)
- Org Noxid (Jamaica)
- Rantoloko Molokoane (South Africa)
- Roger Bonair-Agard (USA)
- Patricia Smith (USA)
- Phillippa Yaa de Villiers (South Africa)
- Phyllis Muthoni (Kenya)
- Poetic Pilgrimage(United Kingdom/Jamaica)
- Saaleha Idrees Bamjee (South Africa)
- Sage Hasson (Nigeria)
- Sam Umokoro (Nigeria)
- Samantha Thornhill (Trinidad & Tobago)
- Sandile Dikeni (South Africa)
- Segun Lee French (United Kingdom/Nigeria)
- Seni Seneviratne (Sri Lanka/United Kingdom)
- Shabbir Banoobhai (South Africa)
- Shailja Patel (Kenya)
- Simric Yarrow (South Africa)
- Stephen Derwent Partington (Kenya)
- Tania van Schalkwyk (South Africa)
- Tantra-Zawadi (USA)
- Tinashe Mushakavanhu (Zimbabwe)
- TJ Dema (Botswana)
- Togara Muzanenhamo (Zimbabwe)
- Tracy K. Smith (USA)
- Uche Nduka (USA/Nigeria)
- Warsan Shire (Somalia)
- Winslow Schalkwyk (South Africa)
- Yrsa Daley-Ward (United Kingdom/Nigeria/Jamaica)
- Zeinixx (Senegal)
- Zena Edwards (United Kingdom)
