= Thomas Pringle Award =

South African literary award

The Thomas Pringle Award is an annual award for work published in newspapers, periodicals and journals. They are awarded on a rotation basis for: a book, play, film or TV review; a literary article or substantial book review; an article on English education; a short story or one-act play; one or more poems. It is named in honour of Thomas Pringle and administered by the English Academy of South Africa.

== Award winners ==
- 2020
  - Tevya Turok Shapiro – Reviews
  - Bhekisiwe Petersen – Literary Article
- 2019
  - Reviews – No award
  - Educational article – No award
  - Sue de Groot – Poetry in a journal
- 2018
  - Tymon Smith – Reviews
  - Rosemary Gray & Jacomein Van Niekerk – Literary article
  - Short story/play – No award
- 2017
  - Karina Magdalena Szczurek – Reviews
  - Marshall Maposa – Educational article
  - Peter Anderson – Poetry in a journal
- 2016
  - Geoffrey Haresnape – Reviews
  - Michael Titlestad – Academic article
  - Nick Mulgrew – Short story/short play
- 2015
  - John Bojé – Reviews
  - Suriamurthee – Educational Article
  - Maistry Rethabile Masilo – Poetry in Journals
- 2014
  - Reviews – No award
  - Gareth Cornwell – Literary Article
  - Anthony Akeman – Short Story/One-Act play
- 2013
  - Reviews – No award
  - Elizabeth Pretorius – Educational Article
  - Beverly Rycroft – Poetry in Journals
- 2012
  - Mary Corrigall – Reviews
  - Lara Buxbaum – Literary Article
  - Lauren van Vuuren – Short story
- 2011
  - Mary Corrigall – Reviews
  - Aslam Fataar and Charles van Renen – Educational article
  - Kelwyn Sole – Poetry
- 2010
  - Michiel Heyns – Reviews
  - Leon de Kock – Literary Article
  - Stephen Watson – Short Story
- 2009
  - Denise Newfield and Robert Maungedzo – Educational Article
  - Mxolisi Nyezwa – Poetry
- 2008
  - Mary Corrigall – Reviews
  - Jamie McGregor – Literary Article
  - David Medalie – Short story
- 2007
  - Chris Thurman – Reviews
  - Ambrose Chimbganda – Educational article
  - Chris Mann – Poetry
- 2006
  - Michiel Heyns – Reviews
  - David Schalkwyk – Literary article
  - Ken Barris – Short story
- 2005
  - Barry Ronge – Reviews
  - Bernat Kruger – Poetry
  - Carolyn McKinney – Educational Article
- 2004
  - Khadija Magardie – Reviews
  - Ananda Cersh – Short Story
  - Isabel Hofmeyr – Literary Article
- 2003
  - Keith Clark & Sandra McKay – Literary Article
  - Jane Rosenthal – Short Story
  - Rustum Kozain – Poetry
- 2002
  - Robert Kirby & Felicity Wood – Educational Article
  - Amanda Gersh – Review
  - Dan Wylie – Short Story
- 2001
  - Shaun de Waal – Reviews
  - Nicole Geslin & Roderick Wade – Educational Article
  - Shabbir Banoobhai – Poetry
- 2000
  - Eve Bertelsen – Reviews
  - Peter Merrington – Literary Article
  - Evan Kaplan – Short Story
- 1999
  - Alexander Sudheim – Reviews
  - Christine Mary Boughey – Educational article
  - Brian Walter – Poetry
- 1998
  - Zakes Mda – Reviews
  - Kelwyn Sole – Literary Article
  - Lerothodi La Pula – Short Story
- 1997
  - Shaun de Waal – Reviews
  - Kathy Luckett – Educational articles
  - Don Maclennan – Poetry
- 1996
  - Robert Kirby – Reviews
  - Isabel Hofmeyr – Literary articles
  - Peter Merrington – Short Story
- 1995
  - Bafana Khumalo – Reviews
  - Christa van der Walt – Educational article
  - Leon de Kock – Poetry
- 1994
  - Stephen Gray – Reviews
  - Michiel Heyns – Literary articles
  - Ivan Vladislavic – Short Stories and one-act plays
- 1993
  - Janice Farquharson – Reviews
  - Brenda Leibowitz – English in education
  - Tatamkulu Afrika – Poetry
- 1992
  - Alexander Johnston – Reviews
  - David Schalkwyk – Literary articles
  - Andries Walter Oliphant – Short Story
- 1991
  - Charlotte Bauer – Reviews
  - Gregory Cunningham – English in education
  - Tatumkulu Afrika – Poetry
- 1990
  - No award – Reviews
  - Dorothy Driver – Literary articles
  - Patrick Cullinan – Short stories
- 1989
  - Stephen Gray – Reviews
  - Binkie Marwick – English in education
  - Douglas Livingstone – Poetry
- 1988
  - No award – Reviews
  - John M Coetzee – Literary articles
  - Rose Zwi – Short stories
- 1987
  - David Williams – Reviews
  - No award – English in education
  - Lionel Abrahams & Mark Swift – Poetry
- 1986
  - Gus Silber – Reviews
  - Jan Gorek & Njabulo Ndebele – Literary articles
- 1985
  - Robert Greig – Reviews
  - Karen Learmont-Batley – English in education
  - Patrick Cullinan – Poetry
- 1984
  - John van Zyl – Reviews
  - Graham Pechey – Literary articles
  - Sheila Roberts – Short stories
- 1983
  - Cherry Clayton – Reviews
  - Elwyn Jenkins – English in education
  - Patrick Cullinan – Poetry
- 1982
  - Peter Wilhem – Reviews
  - John Coetzee – Literary articles
  - Greg Latter – Short Stories
- 1981
  - Andre Lemmer – Short stories, one act plays, general essays
  - Mtutuzeli Matshoba – English in education
  - Peter Strauss – Poetry
- 1980
  - W H Bizley – Literary articles
  - Peter Michael – Film review
  - Creative writing – No award
- 1979
  - Brian Cheadle – Literary articles
  - Arthur Maimane – Creative writing (short story)
  - No award – short stories
- 1978
  - Colin Gardner – Literary articles
  - Lynne Bryer – Book reviews
  - Bruce Hewitt – Creative writing (Poetry)
- 1977
  - Brian Cheadle – Literary articles
  - Peter Reynolds – Play review
  - Lionel Abrahams & Sipho Sepamla – Creative writing (Poems)
- 1976
  - Robert Greig – Play review
  - Anthony Delius – Creative writing (Essay)
  - No award – Literary articles
- 1975
  - Pauline Fletcher – Literary article
  - Phyllis Lewsen – Book review
  - Tess Koller – Creative writing (Poetry)
- 1974
  - Peter Horn – Literary articles
  - Percy Baneshik – Play review
  - No award – Creative writing
- 1973
  - Peter Strauss – Literary article
  - Alan Paton – Book review
  - Christopher Hope – Creative Writing (Poetry)
- 1972
  - Jeff Opland – Literary article
  - Peter Hawthorne – Book review
  - Robert Dederick – Creative writing (Poetry)
- 1971
  - Peter Strauss- Literary article
  - Fleur de Villiers – Play review
- 1970
  - Owen Williams – Play review
- 1969
  - Nadine Gordimer – Creative writing (short story)
- 1968
  - J A Berthoud – Literary article
- 1967
  - Allister Sparks – Newspaper article
- 1964
  - Mary Morison Webster – Book Review
- 1963
  - Ramsay Milne – Editorial or newspaper article

== See also ==
- Olive Schreiner Prize
- Percy FitzPatrick Award
- Sol Plaatje Prize for Translation
