= Gus Ferguson =

South African poet and publisher (1940–2020)

- Born: 1 July 1940; Selkirk, Scotland
- Died: 27 December 2020 (aged 80); South Africa
- Occupations: Publisher, poet, pharmacist

Hugh "Gus" Ferguson (1 July 1940 – 27 December 2020) was a South African poet, small publisher, cartoonist, and pharmacist.

== Career ==
Although a pharmacist by profession, Ferguson was best known as a prolific independent publisher of South African poetry, primarily through his imprint Snailpress, based in Cape Town.

Through Snailpress, and sometimes in collaboration with other presses, Ferguson published over 100 collections, many by notable South African poets, including Douglas Livingstone, Tatamkhulu Afrika, Ingrid de Kok, Patrick Cullinan, Don Maclennan, Jonty Driver, Isobel Dixon, Finuala Dowling, and Rustum Kozain.

Ferguson was also the founder and publisher of Slugnews, a literary magazine that ran for 30 issues from 1989 to 1994, and subsequently Carapace, a poetry magazine that ran for 104 issues until 2015. As such, he has been described by Ben Williams, publisher of The Johannesburg Review of Books, as "South Africa's Atlas of poetry".

Ferguson's own cartoons and poetry were published widely, including in more than a dozen books. He won various poetry and publishing prizes, among which were the AA Via Award, the Eleanor Anderson Special Award and the Molteno Medal. In 2009 he was awarded the English Academy of Southern Africa's Gold Medal for distinguished service to English literature.

== Personal life ==
Ferguson was born in 1940 in Selkirk, Scotland, but in 1949 moved with his parents to South Africa, where he was raised in Harrismith, Durban, and finally Cape Town, where he spent his adult life with his wife and three children. He was an avid cyclist, completing over twenty Cape Town Cycle Tours. He died on 27 December 2020.

== Bibliography ==
- Snail Morning: Poems (1979)
- Doggerel Day: Poems and Drawings (1982)
- Carpe Diem: Poems & Drawings (1992)
- Icarus rising: Selected Poems (1994)
- The Herding of the Snail: An Adaptation in Verse, with pictures by Niki Daly (1995)
- Light Verse at the End of the Tunnel: Poems, prose & drawings (1996)
- Love Amongst the Middle-Aged and Other Cartoons (1997)
- Stressed-Unstressed: Selected Poems and Drawings (2000)
- Arse poetica: Musings on Muse Abuse: Prose, oems, drawings, intertextualities (2003)
- Waiting for Gateau (2004)
- Dubious Delights: of Aging and Other Follies (2006)
- Holding Pattern: Poems & drawings (2009)
