= Olive Schreiner Prize =

The Olive Schreiner Prize
- Awarded for: Novice drama, prose, or poetry in English
- Presented by: English Academy of Southern Africa
- Eligibility: Southern Africa
- Established: 1961

The Olive Schreiner Prize has been awarded annually since 1961 to emerging writers in the field of drama, prose, or poetry. It is named after Olive Schreiner, the South African author and activist. It rewards promising novice work, by writers who are not yet regarded as "established" in the genre. It rotates annually among the genres of drama, prose, and poetry. The prize for each genre is therefore triennial, and is open to work published in the three years since it was last awarded.

The Prize was established in 1961 by the Suid-Afrikaanse Akademie vir Wetenskap en Kuns (SAAWK), and was transferred to the English Academy of Southern Africa in 1972. The Prize was previously sponsored by Shell South Africa, and later by FNB, and under SAAWK was open only to works published in South Africa or Rhodesia by a writer from one of those countries. It is now open to works published in southern African countries by citizens of southern African countries generally. It is not highly remunerated – by 1987, it was worth only R500, and in 2010 was worth R5 000 – but is considered prestigious.

As of 2018, the Prize could not be awarded to the same writer more than twice. To date, this disqualifies only two writers: Rustum Kozain, who has won the poetry prize twice, and Zakes Mda, who has won for both drama and prose.

== Prize winners ==
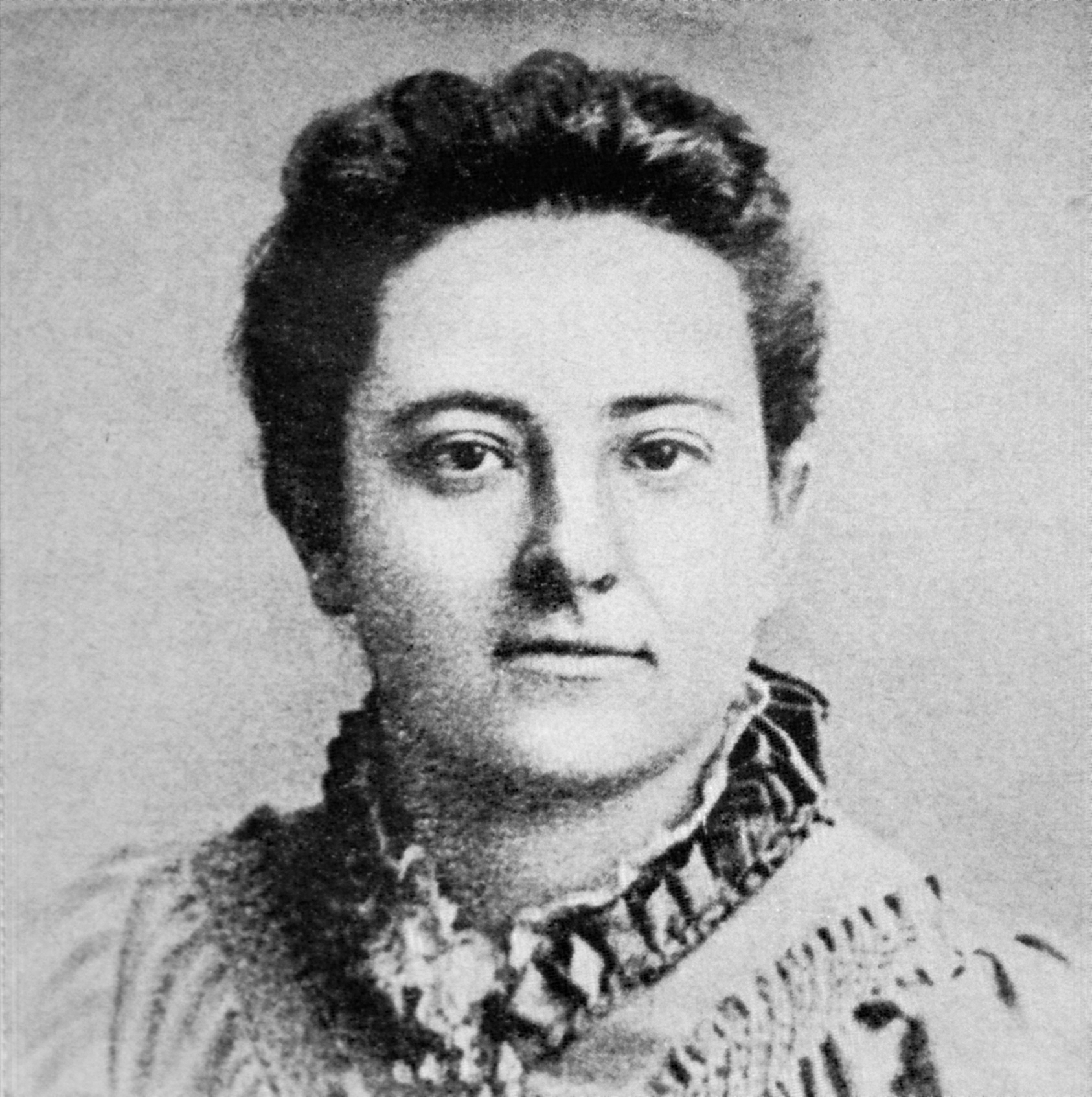
Olive Schreiner in 1889

Winners of the Olive Schreiner Prize (1961–2019)
Year	Form	Winner		Ref.
2025	Poetry	Stephen Symons	The Algebra of Insignificance	
2022	Poetry	Jacques Coetzee	An Illuminated Darkness	
2020	Drama	Nadia Davids	What Remains: A Play in One Act	
2019	Poetry	Allan Kolski Horwitz	The Colours of Our Flag	
2018	Prose	Bronwyn Law-Viljoen	The Printmaker	
2018	Prose	Elleke Boehmer	The Shouting in the Dark	
2017	Drama	Neil Coppen	Tin Bucket Drum	
2016	Poetry	No award		
2015	Prose	Imran Garda	The Thunder that Roars	
2015	Prose	Jill Nudelman	Inheriting the Earth	
2014	Drama	Phillip M. Dikotla	Skierlik	
2013	Poetry	Rustum Kozain	Groundwork	
2012	Prose	Peter Dunseith	The Bird of Heaven	
2011	Drama	Nicholas Spagnoletti	London Road	
2011	Drama	Mike van Graan	Iago's Last Dance	
2010	Poetry	Finuala Dowling	Notes from the Dementia Ward	
2009	Prose	Michael Cawood Green	For The Sake of Silence	
2008	Drama	No award		
2007	Poetry	Rustum Kozain	This Carting Life	
2006	Prose	Jane Taylor	Of Wild Dogs	
2006	Prose	Russel Brownlee	Garden of the Plagues	
2005	Drama	John Kani	Nothing but the Truth	
2004	Poetry	Isobel Dixon	Weather Eye	
2003	Prose	Hugh Lewin	Bandiet out of Jail	
2002	Drama	Xoli Norman	Hallelujah!	
2001	Poetry	Mzi Mahola	When Rains Come	
2000	Prose	Antjie Krog	Country of My Skull	
1999	Drama	Moira Lovell	Bedtime Stories	
1998	Poetry	Dan Wylie	The Road Out	
1997	Prose	Zakes Mda	Ways of Dying	
1996	Drama	Zakes Mda	The Nun's Romantic Story	
1995	Poetry	Allan James	Morning Near Genadendal	
1994	Prose	Deena Padayachee	What's Love Got to Do with It?	
1993	Drama	No award		
1992	Poetry	Tatamkulu Afrika	Nine Lives	
1991	Prose	Ivan Vladislavic	Missing Persons	
1990	Drama	Norman Coombe	A Snake in the Garden	
1989	Poetry	Kelwyn Sole	Blood of Our Silence	
1988	Prose	John Conyngham	The Arrowing of the Cane	
1987	Drama	No award		
1986	Poetry	Lionel Abrahams	Journal of a New Man	
1985	Prose	Menan du Plessis	A State of Fear	
1984	Drama	Junction Avenue Theatre Company	Randlords and Rotgut	
1983	Poetry	Chris Mann	New Shades	
1982	Prose	Rose Zwi	Another Year In Africa	
1981	Drama	No award		
1980	Poetry	Patrick Cullinan	Today Is Not Different	
1980	Poetry	Chris van Wyk	It Is Time to Go Home	
1979	Prose	Ahmed Essop	The Hajji And Other Stories	
1978	Drama	John Cundill	Redundant & Waiting	
1977	Poetry	Robert Greig	Talking Bull	
1976	Prose	Sheila Roberts	Outside Life's Feast	
1975	Drama	Douglas Livingstone	A Rhino For the Boardroom	
1974	Poetry	Oswald Mtshali	The Sounds of a Cowhide Drum	
1973	Prose	Sheila Fugard	The Castaway	
1972	Drama	No award		
1971	Poetry	Elias Pater	In Praise of Night	
1970	Prose	No award		
1969	Drama	No award		
1968	Poetry	Sydney Clouts	One Life	
1967	Prose	M. F. C. Roebuck	Nyitso	
1966	Drama	No award		
1965	Poetry	No award		
1964	Prose	Anna M. Louw	20 Days That Autumn	
1963	Drama	H. W. D. Manson	The Noose-Knot Ballad	
1962	Prose	No award		
1961	Poetry	F. D. Sinclair	His work	
