= Judith Mason =

South African artist (1938–2016)

- Judith Mason and squirrel monkey October 1975
- Born: Judith Seelander Menge; 10 October 1938; Pretoria, South Africa
- Died: 28 December 2016 (aged 78); White River, Mpumalanga
- Education: Pretoria High School for Girls
- Alma mater: University of the Witwatersrand
- Known for: oil, pencil, printmaking and mixed media
- Spouse: Revil Mason

Judith Mason born Judith Seelander Menge (10 October 1938 – 28 December 2016) was a South African artist who worked in oil, pencil, printmaking and mixed media. Her work is rich in symbolism and mythology, displaying a rare technical virtuosity.

== Biography ==
Judith Mason was born in Pretoria; South Africa, in 1938. She matriculated at the Pretoria High School for Girls in 1956. In 1960, she was awarded a BA Degree in Fine Arts at the University of the Witwatersrand. She taught painting at the University of the Witwatersrand, the University of Pretoria, the Michaelis School of Fine Art in Cape Town, Scuola Lorenzo de' Medici in Florence, Italy from 1989 to 1991 and acted as external examiner for under-graduate and post-graduate degrees at Pretoria, Potchefstroom, Natal, Stellenbosch and Cape Town Universities. Several of Mason's works deal with the atrocities uncovered by the Truth and Reconciliation Commission. Mason died in White River 28 December 2016.

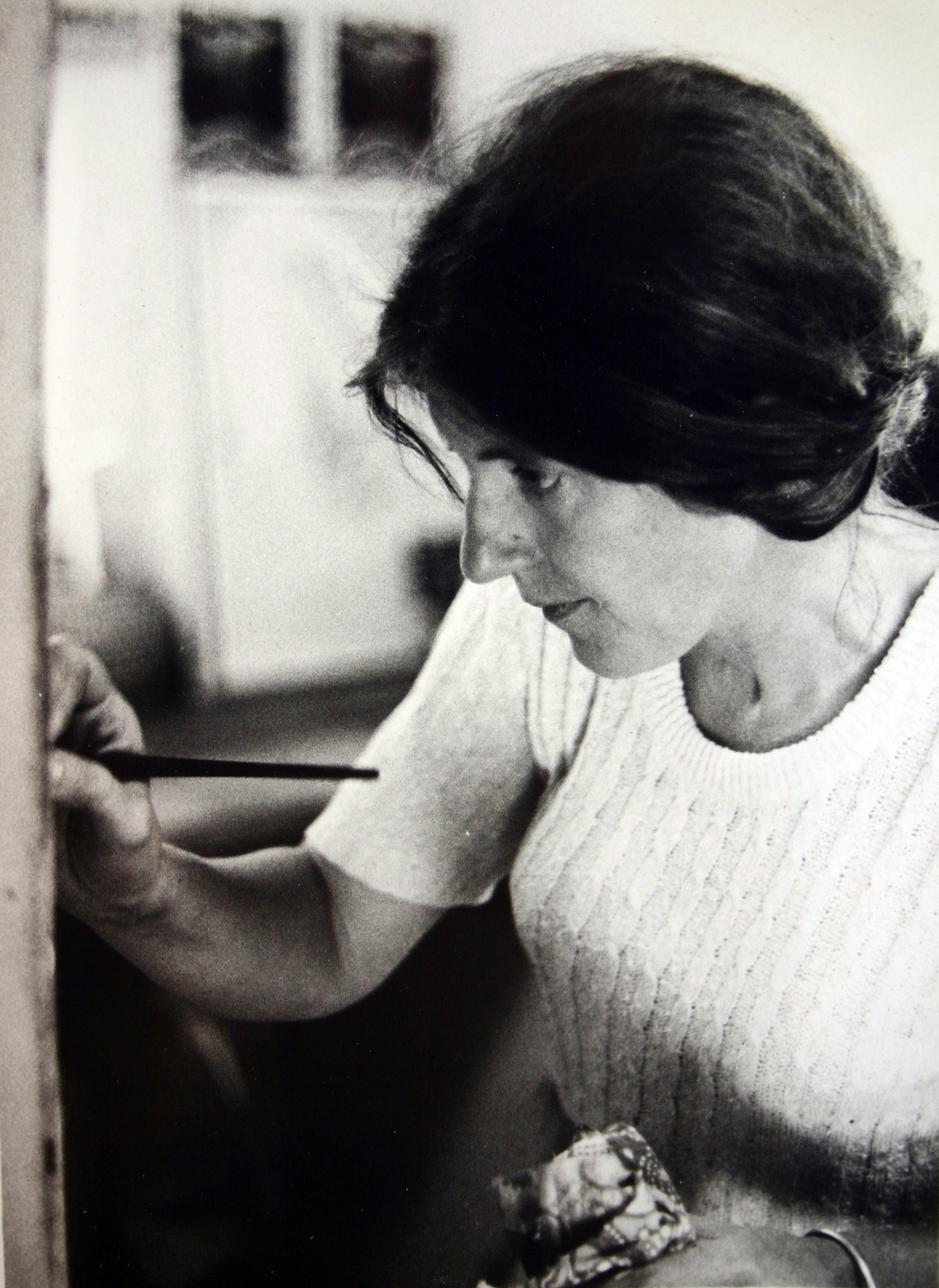

== Exhibitions ==
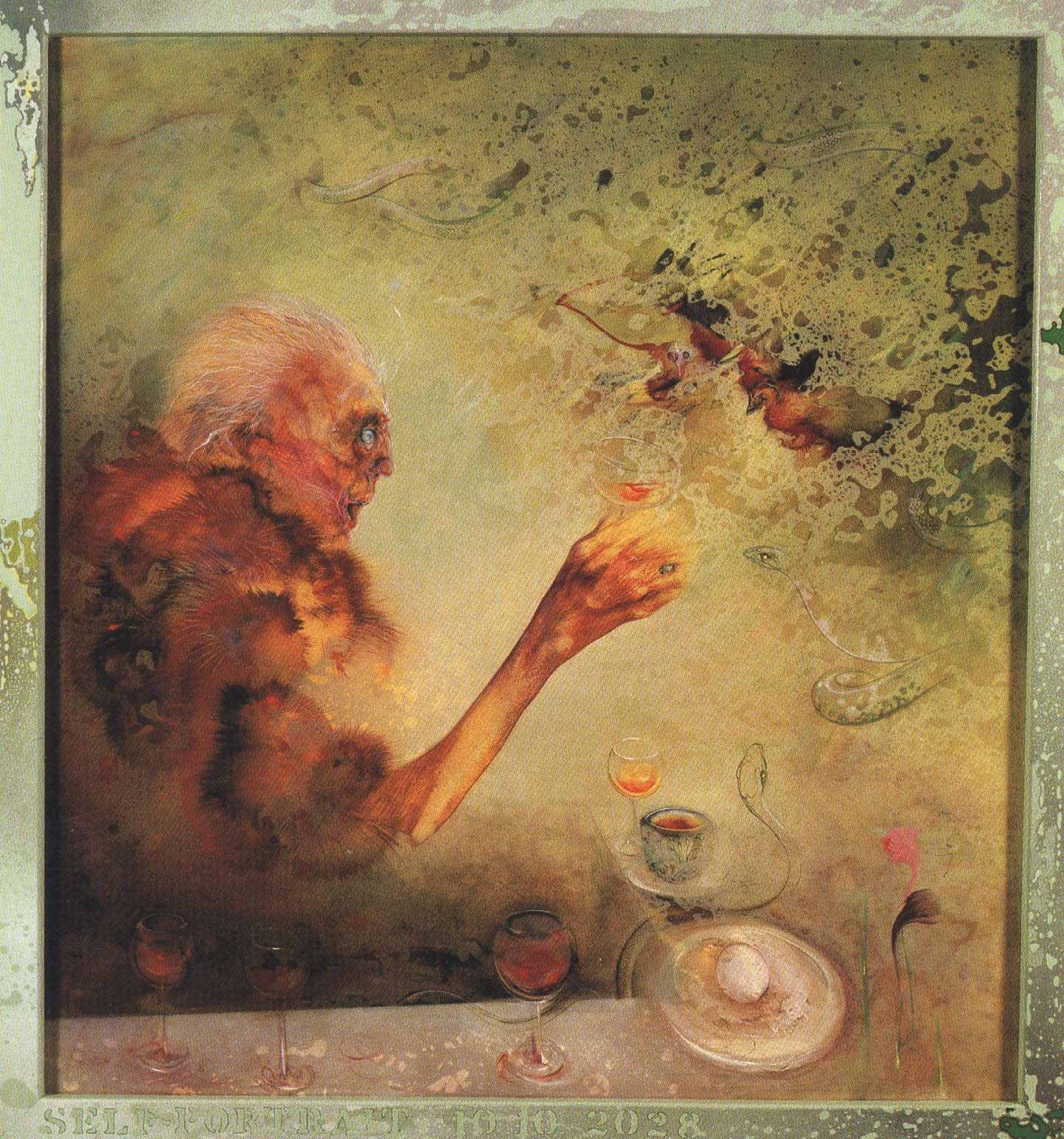
Self-portrait at 90

Major retrospective: Judith Mason 'A Prospect of Icons' Standard Bank Gallery 2 – – 6 October December 2008 and Sasol Art Museum, University of Stellenbosch 14 January to March 2009. Catalogue published in conjunction with the exhibition. Mason's artist's books were showcased in Washington DC at the National Museum for African Art for the 'Artists' Books and Africa' exhibition ended 11 September 2016. 'Undiscovered Animals' June 2016 was her final exhibition.

Mason exhibited frequently in South Africa, with works in all the major South African art collections as well as in private and public collections in Europe and the United States. Exhibitions of her work have been held in Greece, Italy, The Netherlands, Belgium, Chile, Germany, Switzerland, New York and Miami.

Her major public commissions included: The Man Who Sang and The Woman Who Kept Silent aka The Blue Dress at the Constitutional Court in Johannesburg, South Africa. Several large tapestries in collaboration with Marguerite Stephens and stained-glass window designs for the Great Park Synagogue in Johannesburg. In 2008, from 2 October to 6 December 2008, the Standard Bank Gallery in Johannesburg, South Africa hosted a major retrospective of paintings, drawings, assemblage, installations, artists books and essays. Sasol Art Museum at the University of Stellenbosch installed the same retrospective titled: A Prospect of Icons from 14 January to 28 March 2009. Her first solo exhibition was at Gallery 101, Johannesburg, in 1964 after winning second prize in the U.A.T competition in 1963. Mason has exhibited regularly in Johannesburg, Cape Town, Pretoria, Stellenbosch, Mpumalanga and George. Goodman Gallery, Chelsea Gallery, Association of Arts Pretoria, Association of Arts Cape Town, Hout Street Gallery, Strydom Gallery, Dorp Street Gallery, Art on Paper, Abalone Gallery, Sasol Art Museum, University of Stellenbosch, Standard Bank Museum, Karen Mackerron Gallery, as well as lithographs, oil paintings and drawings at Ombondi Gallery in New York in 1990 and more recently, tapestries, paintings and drawings at the Deering Estate, Miami Dade, 2016 and lithographs at Art Basel Miami Beach 2010 and 2015. She represented South Africa at the Venice Biennale, 1986, São Paulo Biennale 1973, Brazil, Valparaiso Biennale 1979, Chile and Houston Arts Festival 1980, USA.

== Publications ==
- The Mind's Eye: An Introduction to Making Images (Books & Books Press USA, 2016, 2017) ISBN 978-0-9913271-5-7
- India's Elephants, Introduction Essay. Photographs by Annette Bonnier Books & Books Press, 2014) ISBN 098-3-9378-8-5
- Walking With and Away From Dante. Artwork and text by Judith Mason. Edited by Johann de Lange Publisher: Ettienne Koekemoer, Cape Town, South Africa 2011. Signed and numbered.
- TAXI-015: Paul Stopforth, Essay. Edited Bronwyn Law-Viljoen, publisher, David Krut, Johannesburg, South Africa, 2010
- Art and Justice: The Art of the Constitutional Court of South Africa. Edited Bronwyn Law-Viljoen David Krut ISBN 9780958497558
- A Prospect of Icons published on the occasion of her retrospective, Judith Mason: A Prospect of Icons. (Standard Bank of South Africa, 2008) ISBN 978-0-620-41289-6
- Dante in South Africa By Stephen Watson. Edited Patrick Cullinan. Publisher Center for Creative Writing, University of Cape Town ISBN 0-620-35549-2
- A Dante Bestiary (Ombondi Editions, NY, 1990) Printed by Bruce Attwood, the Broederstroom Press.
- Skoenlapper Heuwel, Skoenlapper Vrou illustrated poem by Wilma Stockenstrom (Butterfly Hill, Butterfly Woman Publisher: Ombondi Editions, NY. Printed by Bruce Attwood at the Broederstroom Press, 1988.
- Selected Poems by Patrick Cullinan, 1992, Artists' Edition printed by Mark Attwood, The Artists' Press .
- Talking Pictures Essays Printed by Bruce Attwood Broederstroom Press, Publisher Broederstroom Press, Broederstroom, South Africa, 1989.
- Concordant Silence Mixed Media Portfolio including photolithography, lithography, plate sinking, photography and gilding by hand and gold leaf in collaboration with poet Ted Townsend Signed and numbered. Edition of 75.

== Select collections abroad ==
- Museum of Modern Art (MoMA), New York City
- Smithsonian National Museum of African Art, Washington DC
- The Bodleian Library, University of Oxford, UK
- Yale University, USA
