= Sheila Roberts =

Sheila Roberts may refer to:

- Sheila Roberts (South African writer) (1937–2025), South African writer
- Sheila Roberts (American writer) (born 1951), American novelist
