= Country of My Skull =

1998 book by Antjie Krog

- Cover of the first edition
- Author: Antjie Krog
- Language: English
- Publisher: Random House
- Publication date: 1998
- Publication place: South Africa
- Pages: 286

Country of My Skull is a 1998 nonfiction book by Antjie Krog about the South African Truth and Reconciliation Commission (TRC). It is based on Krog's experience as a radio reporter, covering the Commission from 1996 to 1998 for the South African Broadcasting Corporation. The book explores the successes and failures of the Commission, the effects of the proceedings on her personally, and the possibility of genuine reconciliation in post-Apartheid South Africa.

Country of My Skull blends poetry, prose, reporting, and verbatim testimony from the Commission — one critic calls it "a hybrid work, written at the edges of reportage, memoir, and metafiction." It was Krog's first work in English. She drafted it in Afrikaans and translated it for publication. It was edited by Ivan Vladislavic.

It was published in the United States by Times Books in 1999, as Country of My Skull: Guilt, Sorrow, and the Limits of Forgiveness in the New South Africa. In 2004, the book was adapted into the film In My Country, directed by John Boorman and starring Samuel L. Jackson and Juliette Binoche.

== Contents and themes ==
The book centres on the public hearings of the Commission, which Krog and other journalists followed to venues across the country. It collects accounts from the hearings, including testimony from witnesses — some of it vivid and disturbing — and documents the progress of the Commission, including several scandals in the press. At the same time, the book follows Krog's personal experience during this period, including the effects on her personal life and mental health, as she attempts to grapple with the country's bloody history, with the unfolding social and political landscape of democratic South Africa, and with moral questions about complicity, guilt, forgiveness, and responsibility.

These moral questions especially preoccupy Krog because she is a white Afrikaner who retains a strong attachment to Afrikaans culture and history, even as she is horrified by the ravages of Apartheid. (The book is dedicated to "every victim who had an Afrikaner surname on her lips.") Her sense of belonging in the new South Africa depends on the possibility of constructing a new Afrikaner identity. Krog is also occupied by questions about language: about the inadequacy of any language to express the depth of suffering experienced under Apartheid, and particularly about the association of her native tongue, Afrikaans, with Apartheid. She asks, "How do I live with the fact that all the words used to humiliate, all the orders given to kill, belonged to the language of my heart?" In reflecting on these questions, Krog draws on the moral philosophy, and notably the philosophy of ubuntu, of such figures as President Nelson Mandela and Archbishop Desmond Tutu, who was the head of the Commission. She is occasionally deeply moved by exhibitions of these philosophies, and she admires Tutu in particular, calling him "the compass" and the core of the Commission — most importantly, "It is he who finds language for what is happening." For example, as Krog watches Tutu plead personally with Winnie Mandela to testify truthfully, she has an intense emotional reaction:

Ah, the Commission! The deepest heart of my heart. Heart that can only come from this soil — brave — with its teeth firmly in the jugular of the only truth that matters. And that heart is black. I belong to that blinding black African heart. My throat floats up in tears — my pen falls to the floor, I blubber behind my hand, my glasses fog up — for one brief, shimmering moment this country, this country is also truly mine.

She writes of the Commission, "here the marginalised voice speaks to the public ear, the unspeakable is spoken — and translated — the personal story brought from the innermost depths of the individual binds us anew to the collective." However, she also criticises various aspects of the Commission, for example pointing out the inadequacy of the government's approach to reparations and the exploitation of the hearings for political purposes.

Krog ultimately judges herself and other whites to have been complicit in Apartheid's crimes against humanity. Country of My Skull ends with a request in verse:

I am changed forever. I want to say:
forgive me
forgive me
forgive me.
You whom I have wronged, please
Take me

With you.

== Reception ==
Country of My Skull received the Alan Paton Award, the Olive Schreiner Prize, and a Booksellers' Choice Award. It also received an honourable mention in the 1999 Noma Awards for Publishing in Africa, and was named one of "Africa's 100 Best Books" of the twentieth century, by a panel of judges organised by the Zimbabwe International Book Fair in collaboration with the African Publishers Network and the Pan-African Booksellers Association. In 2014, the Library and Information Association of South Africa selected Country of My Skull in its "Librarians' Choice" list of the twenty best South African books written in the twenty years since the first democratic elections.

The book received generally, but not exclusively, favourable reviews, both in South Africa and abroad. Afrikaans writer Rian Malan called it "a great impressionistic splurge of blood and guts and vivid imagery, leavened with swathes of post-modern literary discourse and fragments of brilliant poetry." Another review called it "a work so fine, filled with such passion, that it is difficult to do it justice." Foreign Affairs said, "That such a beautiful book could be written on so ugly a subject inspires confidence in the viability of South Africa's new order." In World Literature Today, Ursula A. Barnett said that it "often reaches the greatness" of Primo Levi's works about the Holocaust.

Several reviewers commented on how difficult it is to read the detailed TRC testimony of victims of human rights abuses, and Nicole Devarenne of the London Review of Books suggested that Krog's personal suffering over the course of the book is supposed to appear "redemptive": when Krog finds unity with her countrymen (especially her non-white countrymen), it is because she suffers alongside them. In this regard, Krog's approach was controversial. Reviews discussed "the danger of appropriation" in respect of the stories of the victims of human rights abuses. Critics debated whether Krog's post-modern "textual and critical highjinks" — which serve to introduce an element of subjectivity into the book, and to blur the boundaries between Krog's dual roles as journalist and poet — are adequate to the gravity and historical importance of the subject matter, and whether they privilege Krog's narrative of personal redemption and personal suffering over the broader narrative of the TRC and the more severe suffering of black South Africans during Apartheid. The incorporation of passages written in the voices of others, especially witnesses at the TRC, has been read both as appropriation and as "the de-centering or remaking of the self."

In Mosaic, Méira Cook noted that a "post-apartheid genre of 'memory writing'" was already entrenched — in "confessional" writings by Njabulo Ndebele, Alex Boraine, and Graham Pechy, among others — by the time that Country of My Skull was published. However, in the Journal of Southern African Studies, Carli Coetzee argues that Krog's book is set apart by her efforts "to speak about whiteness, but not simply to whites." The book, she said, seemed "emblematic of a new way of talking about whiteness."

== Plagiarism allegations ==
In a 2006 edition of the literary review New Contrast, poet Stephen Watson, then head of the English department at the University of Cape Town, alleged that parts of Country of My Skull had been plagiarised from a 1976 essay, "Myth and Education," by Ted Hughes. Krog strongly denied the allegation, saying that she had not been aware of the Hughes essay until after the book's publication.

During the controversy that followed Watson's allegations, the Mail & Guardian published claims that Krog had also lifted, without attribution, parts of Isabel Hofmeyr's non-fiction book, We Spend Our Years as a Story That is Told: Oral Historical Narrative in a South African Chiefdom (1994). Responding to such accusations, Krog wrote:

Country of My Skull is my own, highly personalised version of experiences at the TRC. Country of My Skull is NOT a journalistic or factual report of the Truth Commission. In fact, the problem of truth, the ethical questions around the 'making' of truth, the use of other people's truths, the relation between power and truth, and other factors at play in the execution of truth, all form part of the text itself.

== Awards ==
- Alan Paton Award for Non-Fiction (1999)
- Nielsen Booksellers' Choice Award (1999)
- Olive Schreiner Prize (2000)
