= Mahola =

Mahola is a surname. Notable people with the surname include:

- Mzi Mahola, South African writer
- Zolani Mahola, South African singer
