= Badilisha Poetry Radio =

A project of the Badilisha Poetry X-Change Badilisha Poetry Radio is an online platform created to appreciate, celebrate and discover contemporary Pan-African poetry. Badilisha Poetry Radio focuses on weekly podcasts featuring poets from the African Continent and its Diaspora. It is a space dedicated to the exposure and growth of previously unheard and unknown poetry voices from the continent, and an archive of historical poets from the continent and beyond.

Badilisha Poetry Radio is the only poetry podcast platform exclusively dedicated to voices of Africa and the Diaspora, based and produced on the African continent. Centered in Cape Town, South Africa Badilisha Poetry Radio was launched on 30 April 2010. It presents diverse genres of poetic expression that include performance and multimedia and enables spaces for discussion and debate as a means to explore the poetic form as a tool for social activism.

As of June 2017, Badilisha Poetry Radio features more than 350 poets from different corners of the globe including the Caribbean, United Kingdom, Germany, Ghana, Zimbabwe, Kenya, South Africa and Nigeria.

== Poets ==
=== Africa ===
As the only poetry podcast platform produced in Africa, Badilisha Poetry Radio showcases poets from diverse countries in Africa. These include Tanzania, Kenya, Uganda, South Africa, Mozambique, Lesotho, Nigeria, Rwanda, Zimbabwe, Somalia and the Democratic Republic of the Congo with performances in English, Portuguese, Kiswahili, and Sotho, amongst others. Various genres of poetry are presented on the site with features on readings by page poets as well as Spoken word and Slam poetry.

African Poets on Badilisha Poetry Radio include Tina Mucavele Mozambique, Ngwatilo Mawiyoo Kenya, Togara Muzanenhamo Zimbabwe, Chiedu Ifeozo Nigeria, James Matthews South Africa, prominent poet, academic and writer Antjie Krog[ South Africa, Moses Serubiri Uganda, Chenjerai Hove Zimbabwe, Aryan Kaganof South Africa, and Breyten Breytenbach South Africa.

Badilisha Poetry Radio has a strong presence of poets who use poetry as a form of social activism. Prominent exiled poet, novelist and social commentator Chenjerai Hove of Zimbabwe is committed to bearing witness to Zimbabwe's history and current political climate. A fearless observer and outspoken social and cultural critic, Hove has not shied away from recording the violence of the new Zimbabwe in his fiction, poetry and journalism. Kenyan poet, playwright and activist Shailja Patel is described as the 'face of globalization as a people-centered phenomenon of migration and exchange' and 'the poetic equivalent of Arundhati Roy.

=== Diaspora ===
Badilisha Poetry Radio includes poetry voices from the African Diaspora. Poets from North America, Europe and the Caribbean feature regularly on the platforms weekly podcasts.

==== North America ====
Badilisha Poetry Radio hosts diverse genres and poets from North America including Poetry Slam winners Anis Mojgani and Trinidad and Tobago native Roger Bonair-Agard. Winner of back to back titles in the National Individual Poetry Slam Anis Mojgani features on Badilisha Poetry Radio with his poem 'come closer' and two time National US National Slam Champion Roger Bonair-Agard performs his poem 'how the ghetto loves us back'. Dubbed the 'voice of a generation' Oromo poet Boona Mohamed is a critically acclaimed award-winning writer and performer. He uses his poetry as a voice for minorities and oppressed groups in Canada. His poem 'Green card' articulates the experiences of immigrant children living in the West.
