= Alan James (disambiguation) =

Alan James may refer to:

- Alan James (1890–1952), American film director and screenwriter
- Alan James (poet), South African writer
- Alan James (actor) (fl. 1964–1992), see The Keys of Marinus
