= Menán du Plessis =

South African novelist and linguist

Menán du Plessis (born 1952) is a South African novelist and linguist.

Her debut novel A State of Fear won the 1985 Olive Schreiner Prize, and was a joint winner of the Sanlam Literary Prize in 1986.

== Works ==
- A State of Fear. Cape Town: D. Philip, 1983. Republished by Pandora Press (1987).
- Longlive! Cape Town: D. Philip, 1989. Translated into German by Susanne Köhler as Das Lied der Gemeinschaft Roman.
- A unity hypothesis for the southern African Khoesan languages. PhD thesis, University of Cape Town, 2009.
- Kora: a lost Khoisan language of the early Cape and the Gariep. Pretoria: Unisa Press, 2018.
