= America Martin =

American painter and sculptor

- Born: July 7, 1980 (age 45); Los Angeles, California, United States
- Occupation(s): Painter and Sculptor
- Website: www.americamartin.com

America Martin (born 7 July 1980) is an American painter, sculptor, and self-proclaimed painting anthropologist. Martin's primary subject is the human form. Her style mixes abstract and indigenous motifs and has been compared to mid-century artists. She credits her Colombian roots for her aesthetic and tastes.

== Family and early life ==
America was born in Los Angeles in 1980 to a family of artists. Her uncle is painter Knox Martin; her father is an artist, matador, and author Ernest J. T. Martin; her mother is an academic, and her siblings went on to pursue careers in the arts. She began drawing at age nine after discovering the work of Vincent Van Gogh. Shortly thereafter, she began an eight-year apprenticeship with Vernon Wilson, a professor at the ArtCenter College of Design in Pasadena. Martin also worked briefly as an actress, notably as Patsy in Disney's The Rocketeer, while attending Crossroads School for the Arts and Sciences in Santa Monica, California.

== Fine art ==
Martin has worked in a variety of visual artistic media including painting, drawing, and sculpting in steel and aluminum. She is best known for her large oil and acrylic nude paintings. In addition to her female nudes, Martin's subjects include jazz musicians, boxers, Native Americans, street scenes, landscapes, and still lives.

== Artistic style ==
In terms of process, Martin uses her whole body when painting, using the length of her arms to control the strokes. She has also being complimented for her command of line and color. Her move to a new studio in Silver Lake, Los Angeles, in 2009 allowed her to experiment with a variety of new media. It has and continues to act as a venue to host a variety of cultural events that support the artistic community. She also works in collections, painting and drawing a unique body of work distinct from the exhibition location.

== Career ==
Martin has been shown and collected internationally. In 2002, she had her first solo show in Beverly Hills and has since been exhibited in solo and group shows. In 2009, she received a residency at the Walter Anderson Museum of Art, with a grant from the Mississippi Arts Commission. She has been represented in Austin, Laguna Beach, Los Angeles, New Jersey, New York City, Ontario, Santa Barbara, Taos and Maine. Since 2017, her work has been displayed in American embassies as a part of the US State Department's Art in Embassies (AIE) program.

== Bibliography ==
- Insouciance: Artwork by America Martin. Snail Press. 3 February 2010. p. 140. ISBN 978-0-615-34533-8.
- "Yes" Selected Works From 2009-2012 (First ed.). [Los Angeles, California]: Snail Press Publications. 2013. p. 96. ISBN 978-0615811833.
