= Sheila Roberts (South African writer) =

South African writer (1942–2009)

- Born: 25 May 1942 Johannesburg, South Africa
- Died: 11 August 2009 (aged 67)
- Occupation: Writer, professor
- Genre: Novel, short story, poem
- Notable awards: Olive Schreiner Prize (1976); Thomas Pringle Award

Sheila Roberts (25 May 1942 – 11 August 2009) was a South African novelist, short story writer, and poet, who was a professor of English language at the University of Wisconsin-Milwaukee.

== Life ==
Roberts was born in Johannesburg, South Africa. In an obituary by Mail & Guardian, her date of birth was 25 May 1942 even though there was a speculation of 1937. Her parents were Gideon P. and Claire M. (née Freestone). Roberts married Peter Roberts on 17 January 1963. Peter died on 19 April 1971. She remarried to Professor Philip C. McGuire on 20 June 1980. Roberts studied in the University of South Africa where she got her B.A. in 1967 and M.A. in 1972. In 1977, she received her PhD from the University of Pretoria.

Her first story collection, Outside Life's Feast (1975), won the Olive Schreiner Prize in 1976. Her first poetry collection, Lou's Life and Other Poems, was published in 1977, and her debut novel, He's My Brother, was also published in the same year. In 1980, the novel was published as Johannesburg Requiem in North America, but was banned. Her second novel was The Weekenders (1981). After two years, she published her second collection titled, This Time of Year (1983). She was awarded Thomas Pringle Award by the English Academy of South Africa for her short stories published in the periodical, Contrast. Roberts wrote a critical work entitled Dan Jacobson (1984). It was followed by her poetry collection, Dialogue and Divertimenti (1985), a novel Jacks in Corners (1987), and a short story collection, Coming In and Other Stories (1993).
