= Mzi Mahola =

South African writer, author and poet (born 1949)

Mzi Mahola was a South African writer, author and poet. He was born on 12 February 1949, in Claremont near Durban. He grew up between Lushington near Seymour and Port Elizabeth, living the Eastern Cape as Mzikayise Winston Mahola. He died at home in Zwide on 26 August 2023. Mzi Mahola was his pen name.

== Biography ==
Mzi Mahola was born in Claremont in near Durban in 1949. He started writing in 1969 at Healdtown High School. In the 1970s he joined the Black Consciousness Movement (BCM). (BCM). He later became a member of a non-racial youth group called Isihlobo Youth Group (Friendship) and which had an emblem of a black and white reef-knot indicating friendship. Isihlobo Youth Group was a daughter body of the Institute of Race Relations. Mahola was periodically detained and interrogated for his writings. The Special Branch confiscated his first poetry manuscript in August 1975. Due to persecution as well as the loss of his manuscript he lost interest in writing for fourteen years. He started writing again in 1989 and joined the Congress of South African Writers (COSAW). He submitted his work to various national and international poetry journals, magazines, publications and anthologies. Some of his work was published jointly, with other writers of the world in twenty-eight anthologies. Extracts of his work have been translated into Danish, German, Norwegian, Spanish, Turkish and Malayalam languages. Mahola wrote poetry, drama, novel and script. He translated a selection of his poems into his mother tongue and published his first Xhosa poetry book titled Ezingaqhelekanga, meaning Strange Things in 2021.

Mahola conducted many poetry workshops in various venues around the country. He also adjudicated in many competitions including the works of Port Elizabeth poets who took part in the twinning of the two cities of Goteborg (Sweden) and Port Elizabeth, South Africa. This intercity twinning project resulted in the exchange visits of young writers between the two cities in 2000.

His first poetry volume Strange Things (Snailpress 1994) was selected to represent South Africa in the World Book Fair in Geneva in 1995. His second poetry book of verse, When Rains Come (Carapace 2000) won the Olive Schreiner Literary award for 2000-01 under the auspices of Wits English Academy. In 2004 he represented South African writers in Glasgow in a symposium between writers of the two countries to celebrate South Africa’s tenth anniversary of democracy. In 2006, Mahola took part in the International Africa Poetry Festival. In 2008 he represented the Eastern Cape in a cultural week in Athens.

== Childhood Sports Youth Politics and Activities ==
Mzi Mahola attended school in Lushington until the age of 12. In 1962 he joined his parents in Port Elizabeth, Eastern Cape. At the age of 13 he started boxing and lost one fight in more than 80 amateur fights, training with the Fighting Terrors under the late Mr. Nyami Phemba at T.C. White Hall. In 1979 he was crowned national Flyweight Champion at the South African Amateur Boxing Union championships (SAABU) held at Milner Park in Gauteng. He turned professional and became the Eastern Province Bantamweight Champion. He held the title until 1983, when sport was suspended due to national unrests. He was unbeaten in 12 professional fights. He also served as Treasurer of Boast Pirates Football Club. In 1983 he was recruited to operate underground for the ANC.

In 1984 the commander of his underground unit sent him to Lesotho for political training. Upon his return he formed a worker’s union at the Port Elizabeth Museum where he worked. He recruited a white woman for underground operation in his unit. He successfully went in and out of the former Transkei Homeland to establish underground units.

Mahola was in the executive of Uncwadi Writers Association and a member of Bhala Writers organization. He was also a Chairperson of the Friends of the Zwide Library where he conducted a voluntary project of creative writing until the outbreak of the Covid-19 pandemic. As a member of the Toastmasters International he won first place in the Eastern Cape Division in Humorous Speech Competition in 1990. He came second place in the finals at national level held at UNISA later that year.

Mahola’s poem commemorating fallen heroes of the struggle is scrawled on the monument at Emlotheni Memorial Park in New Brighton in Gqeberha. He was one of the recipients of a book honoring pillars of Korsten and New Brighton compiled by the Wall of Honor committee and their respective communities in 2014. His name is written in the Wall of Honor in the New Brighton library for his contribution in community development.

== Books ==
His first book with poems is titled Strange Things by Snail Press in 1994. Plumstead [South Africa]: ISBN 978-1-874923-16-9. Because of its late submission for publishing, Mr. Stephen Daitsh who was a friend of the publisher, Mr. Gus Ferguson, sponsored the book to be published. It received positive reviewing and was amongst those selected to represent South Africa in Geneva World Book Fair in 1995. There was interest in translating it into German and Danish, but this has not materialized to date.

His second anthology 'When Rains Come' was also sponsored by Mr. Stephen Daitsh to be published in 2000 by Carapace. It won the Olive Schreiner Literary Prize in the Category Poetry for the year 2000. The Wits English Academy voted the volume the Best English Poetry Book in South Africa for the period 2000 and 2001.

In 2006 his third volume Dancing in the Rain was published by UKZN Printers.

In 2014 he published his fourth poetry volume titled The Last Chapter by Imbizo Arts of South Africa, Port Elizabeth. ISBN 978-0-620-61732-1.

== Novel ==
Mahola’s first novel is titled Dancing With Hyenas, 2016 by Ilitha Publishers, Pretoria. ISBN 978-1-919909-54-7. This novel was born after Mahola’s twenty-five years of poetry writing experience. The semi-biographical novel, inspired by his life before he was recruited to operate underground for the ANC, received positive reviewing because of its nature. It is a narrative of personal encounter, detentions, interrogations, torture and loss of material in the hands of the feared and above-the-law members of the Special Branch. Dancing With Hyenas is not researched information. In addition, this book shows the poet’s ability to intertwine and interplay poetry with storytelling.

Mahola produced four plays. One of them was titled Not in My Room. It won first place in a drama festival to celebrate local talent. It was performed at the Barn, a local theatre house.

The second one titled Something Must Break was performed at the National Arts Festival and it received standing ovation. Mahola also wrote plays for schools taking part in the now defunct Delta Schools Drama Festival. In his last years he is edited and finalised his out of stock collection. He completed and submitted for publishing his second autobiography titled Heroes of the Struggle (The Forgotten Bastards) which is a sequel to Dancing With Hyenas.

This novel reveals his deep involvement but clandestine underground activism; his numerous close shaves with death, all told in first place narration. Names of comrades who operated with him are real. The author claims that this is done to honor them for their contribution, selflessness and steadfastness during the struggle years.

He presented papers and given speeches at the National Arts Festival and at other venues for school children. He gave poetry readings for university groups and community projects. Now and then he ran poetry workshops around the Province for interested groups of writers and learners.

He initiated voluntary poetry workshops that catered for learners in his neighboring municipal library in Zwide township. With the support of the Nelson Mandela Metropolitan main library, Mahola (assisted by Yvonne Skinner) managed to publish Umthombo (The Fountain), a magazine for his workshop participants. The project came to a halt after the outbreak of the Covid-19 pandemic. He later ran the project from home. Learners were engaged in writing, reading and public speaking skills.
