= Revil Mason =

South African archaeologist (1929–2020)

- Born: Revil John Mason; 10 February 1929
- Died: 23 August 2020 (aged 91)
- Education: St John's College
- Alma mater: University of the Witwatersrand; University of Cape Town
- Spouse: Judith Mason
- Children: 2
- Scientific career
- Fields: Archaeology
- Institutions: University of Witwatersrand
- Thesis: The prehistory of the Transvaal : a record of human activity (1958)

Revil John Mason (10 February 1929 – 23 August 2020) was a South African archaeologist. He was Professor of Archaeology at the University of the Witwatersrand.

== Early life and career ==
Mason was born in Johannesburg, grew up in Saxonwold and matriculated from St John's College. He attained a B.Comm degree from the University of the Witwatersrand and was awarded the Aitken medal for the best graduate in commerce as well as the Chamber of Industries medal and the Dean’s award. However after attending a lecture presented by the anthropologist Raymond Dart he became fascinated with archaeology and decided to study it at the University of Cape Town. He was awarded his doctorate in archaeology at the age of 28, with a thesis entitled "The prehistory of the Transvaal : a record of human activity."

At the age of 24 he had successfully excavated Makapansgat and in so doing discerned three layers of the Stone Age within the excavation. He returned on occasion to St John's to present talks on new archaeological finds and led the St John's College Archaeology Club to excavate a Boer War site in the Magaliesberg.

In 1954, at the age of 25, Mason climbed the Brandberg Mountain in Namibia searching for rock art created by the indigenous San people. He discovered abstract San rock art that became known as the Brandberg Picasso.

Mason was appointed a professor by Wits as a successor to Clarence van Riet Lowe. In 1976 the university created the Archaeological Research Unit for Mason and his staff and appointed him Director, a post he held until his early retirement in 1989.

During his career Mason excavated several significant sites including Melville Koppies, Linksfield Ridge, Bruma, and Sterkfontein. He discovered prehistoric iron furnaces and Tswana villages in Johannesburg and excavated a site in Broederstroom which dates back to 300 CE. Part of his life's work was the construction of an archaeological map of the North West and Gauteng provinces. This map is a direct contradiction of the myth perpetuated by the Apartheid government in which it was claimed that the southern portion of the African continent was uninhabited until the arrival of the Dutch settlers in 1652, the so-called "empty land" myth.

== Personal life ==
He was married to Judith Mason, artist, and raised two daughters, Tamar (1966) and Petra (1970).

== Awards, recognition and membership ==
- 2019 - Golden Eagle Award.

== Selected publications ==
- Mason, RJ (1969). Prehistory of the Transvaal: a record of human activity. Witwatersrand University Press.
- Mason, RJ (1986). Origins of black people of Johannesburg and the southern western central Transvaal, AD 350-1880. University of the Witwatersrand, Archaeological Research Unit.
- Mason, RJ (1968). "Transvaal and Natal Iron Age settlement revealed by aerial photography and excavation". African Studies. 27 (4): 167–180. doi:10.1080/00020186808707294. hdl:10539/9120.
- Mason, RJ (1 September 1981). "Early Iron Age settlement at Broederstroom 24/73, Transvaal, South Africa" (PDF). South African Journal of Science. 77 (9): 401–416.
- Mason, RJ; Brain, CK (1988). "Cave of Hearths, Makapansgat, Transvaal". Archaeological Research Unit, University of the Witwatersrand.
- Mason, Revil (1974). "Background to the Transvaal Iron Age-new discoveries at Olifantspoort and Broederstroom" (PDF). Journal of the Southern African Institute of Mining and Metallurgy. 74 (6): 211–216.

== See also ==
- Bokoni - archaeological site
- Lucinda Backwell
