= Christopher Hope (novelist) =

South African novelist and poet (born 1944)

Christopher Hope FRSL
- Born: 26 February 1944 (age 82); Johannesburg, South Africa
- Education: University of Witwatersrand; University of Natal
- Occupations: Novelist and poet
- Spouse: Eleanor Marilyn Margaret Klein (m. 1967, divorced)
- Children: Daniel Hope
- Parent(s): Dudley Mitford and Kathleen Margaret Hope
- Writing career
- Period: 1970–
- Subjects: Racism and politics in South Africa
- Notable works: A Separate Development (1977), Kruger's Alp (1985), White Boy Running (1988)
- Notable awards: Thomas Pringle Award; Cholmondeley Award; David Higham Memorial Prize

Christopher Hope, FRSL (born 26 February 1944) is a South African novelist and poet who is known for his controversial works dealing with racism and politics in South Africa. His son is violinist Daniel Hope.

== Life ==
Christopher Hope was born in Johannesburg, South Africa, to Dudley Mitford and Kathleen Margaret Hope. Hope was educated at the University of Witwatersrand and the University of Natal. He served in the South African Navy beginning in 1962. Hope married Eleanor Marilyn Margaret Klein on 18 February 1967. He is the father of the violinist Daniel Hope. The couple would eventually divorce.

Hope was a founder of the literary magazine Bolt, in 1972, and worked part-time as a literary journalists for the Durban-based Sunday Tribune and as an advertising copywriter. He published two collections or poems at this time: Whitewashes (1970) (with Mike Kirkwood) and Cape Drives (1974). His poetry was suppressed by the South African censors in the 1970s and he left South Africa in 1975 for "self-imposed" exile in London, England. His satirical first novel, A Separate Development, was banned on publication in South Africa in 1977 for its acid portrait of life under apartheid. His memoir, White Boy Running, chronicles this time of Hope's life. While living in London, Hope was a contributor to the BBC, and to various newspapers including The Guardian, Les Temps Modernes, The New Yorker and The Independent.

In 2006, Hope founded the Franschhoek Literary Festival in South Africa, and in 2012 he co-founded the Hermanus Fynarts Festival. In 2014, he wrote the libretto for the musical drama A Distant Drum, commissioned and performed at Carnegie Hall.

== Career ==
Hope's poetry was first published in Whitewashes, a poetry book that was released in 1971. In 1974, his poetry was published as Cape Drives, a collection of original prose. Hope's first novel, A Separate Development, was published in 1981. The novel was banned in South Africa for its overt criticisms of the Apartheid government.

Hope's second novel, Kruger's Alp (1985), was considered a stark contrast to his first work. Kruger's Alp was described by the New York Times Book Review as "a novel in the form of a dream allegory". Despite its departure from Hope's earlier writings, Kruger's Alp was greeted with critical acclaim from various journals, including The New Statesman, New Society and the Daily Telegraph.

Hope's other novels include The Hottentot Room, Darkest England, My Mother's Lovers and Jim Fish. Hope's memoir White Boy Running was published in 1988. In 2017, he was a fellow at the Stellenbosch International Academy for Advanced Study. His work includes essays, stories and plays for radio and, most recently, a portrait of the new South Africa in the post-apartheid years, The Cafe de Move-On Blues (2018).

== Awards ==
Over the course of his career, Hope has earned a number of prestigious writing awards. Cape Drives won Hope the Thomas Pringle Award and a Cholmondeley Award. A Separate Development was the recipient of the David Higham Memorial Prize. Hope won the Whitbread Prize in 1984 for Kruger's Alp. Hope has also been awarded the Professor Alexander Petrie Award, PEN International's Silver Pen Award, and the CNA Award for White Boy Running (1989). Serenity House was shortlisted for the 1992 Booker Prize.

He was elected a Fellow of the Royal Society of Literature in 1990.

== Selected bibliography ==
=== Books ===
- Whitewashes, 1970
- Cape Drives, 1974
- A Separate Development, 1977
- Private Parts & Other Tales, 1981
- In the Country of the Black Pig, 1981
- Kruger's Alp, 1985
- The Hottentot Room, 1986
- Black Swan, 1987
- White Boy Running, 1988
- My Chocolate Redeemer, 1989
- Moscow! Moscow!, 1990
- Serenity House, 1992
- The Love Songs of Nathan J. Swirsky, 1993
- Darkest England, 1996
- Me, the Moon and Elvis Presley, 1997
- Signs of the Heart: Love and Death in Languedoc, 1999
- Heaven Forbid, 2001
- Brothers Under the Skin: Travels in Tyranny, 2003
- My Mother's Lovers, 2006
- Shooting Angels, 2011
- Jim Fish, 2015. French translation 2017
- The Café de Move-on Blues, 2018.

=== Book reviews ===
- Review of André Brink, A Fork in the Road (2009), "Traitor to the tribe". The Guardian. 31 January 2009.
