= Sipho Sepamla =

South African poet and novelist (1932–2007)

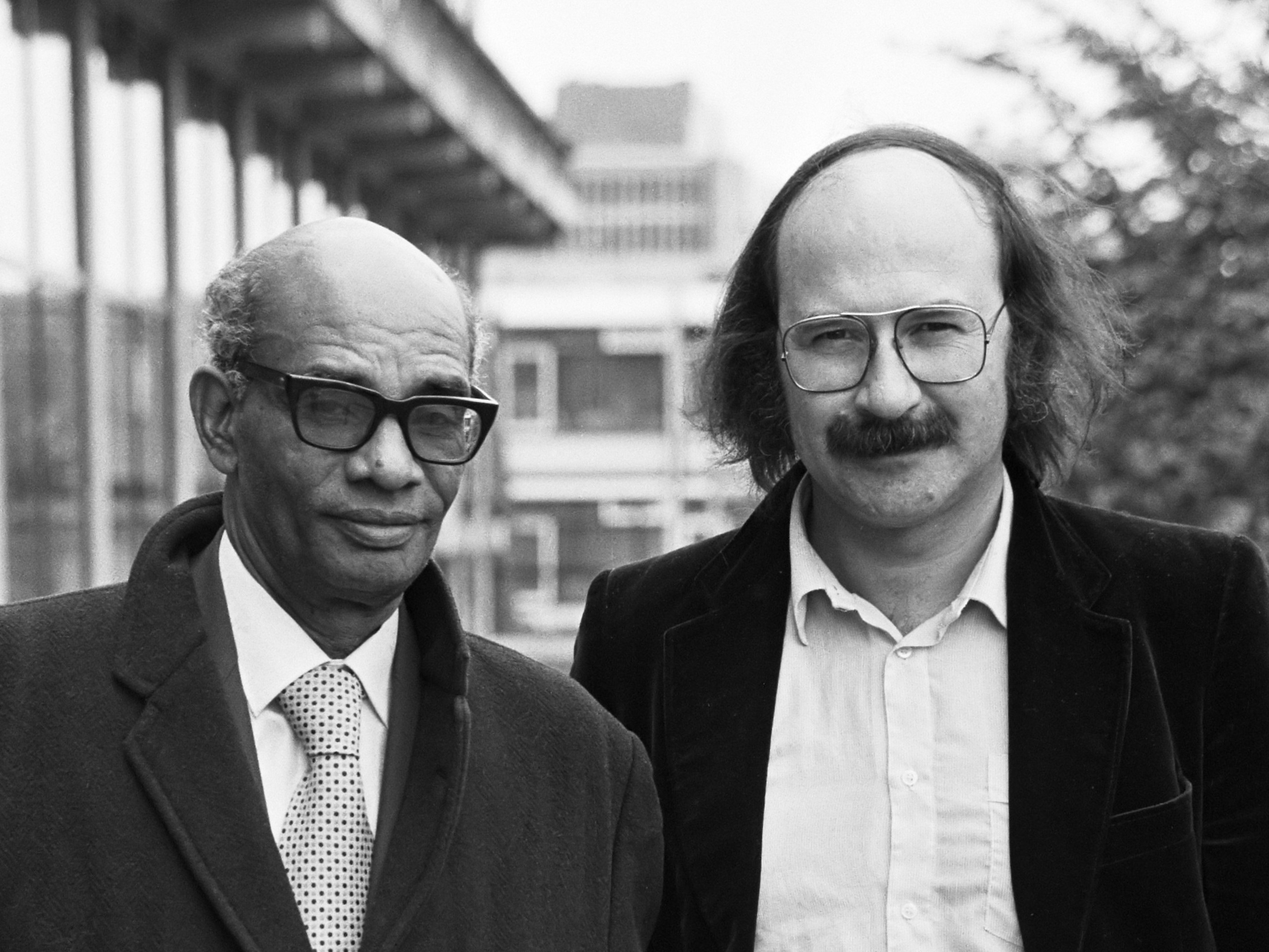
- Sipho Sepamla (l.) and Antonio Skármeta (1981)
- Born: Sydney Sipho Sepamla; 22 September 1932; Krugersdorp, Union of South Africa
- Died: 9 January 2007 (aged 74)
- Occupations: Novelist, poet

Sydney Sipho Sepamla (22 September 1932 – 9 January 2007) was a contemporary South African poet and novelist.

== Biography ==
Born in a township near Krugersdorp, Sipho Sepamla lived most of his life in Soweto. He studied teaching at Pretoria Normal College and published his first volume of poetry, Hurry Up to It!, in 1975. During this period he first joined the Medupe Writers Association, and later was active in the Black Consciousness movement. Here, he wrote his 1977 poetry collectionThe Soweto I Love, partly a response to the Soweto Uprising of 16 June 1976, which was subsequently banned by the apartheid regime. The Soweto I Love often centered around themes of the Black anti-apartheid struggle and the resulting backlash by the apartheid regime. He was a founder of the Federated Union of Black Artists (now the Fuba Academy of Arts) and editor of the literary magazine New Classic and the theatre magazine S'ketsh.

He published several volumes of poetry and novels. He received the Thomas Pringle Award (1977) and the French Ordre des Arts et des Lettres for his writing. More recently in democratic South Africa he was a member of the government's Arts and Culture Task Group.

== Works ==
Poetry

- Hurry Up to It! (Donker, 1975)
- The Soweto I Love (1977)
- Selected poems (Donker, 1984)
- From Gorée to Soweto (1988)

Novels

- The Root is One (1979)
- A Ride on the Whirlwind (1981)
