= Dot Serfontein =

South African writer (1925–2016)

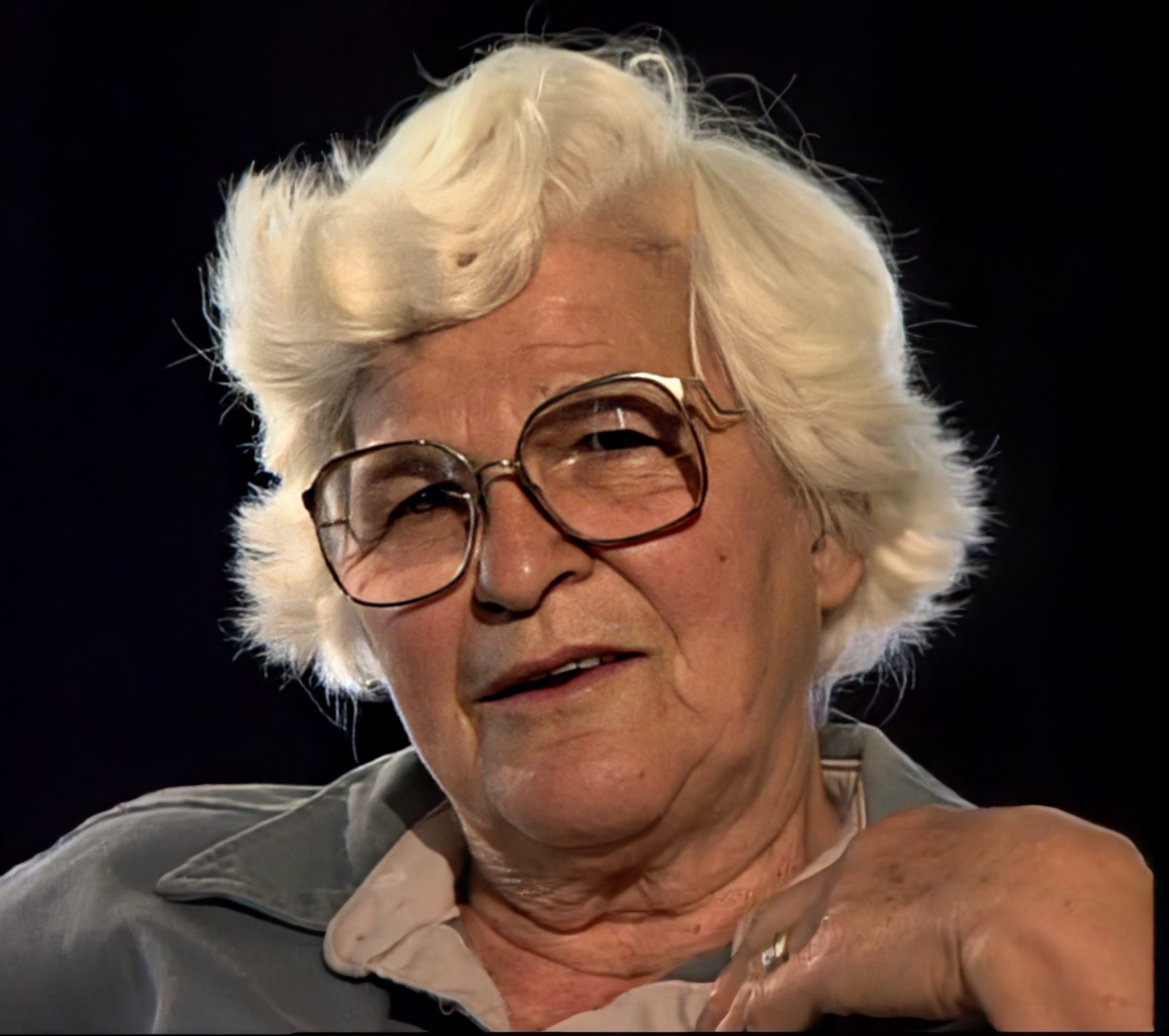
- Born: 30 April 1925 Kroonstad, Orange Free State; Union of South Africa
- Died: 4 November 2016 (aged 91)
- Children: 5, including Antjie Krog

Susanna Jacoba "Dot" Serfontein (30 April 1925 – 4 November 2016) was an Afrikaans writer from Kroonstad in the Free State. She rose to prominence as a short-story and novella writer in the 1960s, particularly publishing in the women's magazine Sarie. She was also a journalist at Die Volksblad. In later years, she published several novels and essay collections, as well as at least two works of non-fiction: Keurskrif vir Kroonstad (1990), a history of Kroonstad, and Vrypas (2009), an autobiography.

== Personal life ==
Serfontein married Willem Krog, a journalist, with whom she had five children. One of her children is author Antjie Krog.
