= Anna M. Louw =

- Born: 31 December 1913
- Died: 12 June 2003 (aged 89)
- Occupation: Novelist
- Writing career
- Language: Afrikaans
- Notable awards: Hertzog Prize; Olive Schreiner Prize

Anna M. Louw (31 December 1913 – 12 June 2003) was a South African author. She was born in Calvinia in a so-called "Nagmaalhuis" (Sunday House, for an outlying family attending church). Her father was a sheep farmer near Calvinia on the farm Soetwater and her mother was a teacher on a farm school in the district.

Louw shares family ties with South African authors NP van Wyk Louw, WEG Louw, George Louw, Peter Louw, Rona Rupert, Charles Fryer, Willem Steenkamp, Johnita le Roux, Nico Louw and Pieter Strauss.

Her undergraduate studies included English, Afrikaans, Dutch, German, French, Psychology and Ethics at the University of Stellenbosch and postgraduate studies were concluded at the University of Cape Town.

Louw married twice. Her children Wendy, Nicholas and Elizabeth were born during her marriage with Lewis Hurst and the twin Christina and Editha were born during her marriage with Gerhard Bassel.

In 1975 Anna accepted her nomination as a member of the Cape committee of the Council on Publications but after the banning of Etienne Leroux's novel Magersfontein, o Magersfontein! in 1977, she resigned as member because she felt anguish about not being able to stop the banning of the publication.

In a discussion with Gary Bowes Taylor in The Star newspaper (6 December 1977) she said: "We have so few works of a really high standard that it breaks one’s heart when one of them is put out of circulation. The directorate were with us all the way in getting Magersfontein through. And then complaints reached the Minister from people who, judging by the samples of their reading matter as given to the Press, read only unknown and slight Afrikaans novels, teenage romance, the most rudimentary fiction. Magersfontein is a closed book, it’s not easily accessible, it’s not easy to understand what Leroux has to say. It moves on a symbolic, satiric, ironic level. (…) Differences of opinion on a book are bound to arise, all the more need for experts to decide on literary matters. What do you do in a so-called democratic society? It is a badly constructed law and it should be completely revised. It is not workable now – there is too much power in the hands of certain people."

She also resigned in 1982 from the panel of literary experts of the Directorate of Publications.

Kroniek van Perdepoort was translated into Dutch by Rob van der Veer.

Anna M. Louw died on 12 June 2003 in her apartment in Rondebosch, Cape Town.

== Awards ==
She won the Olive Schreiner Prize in 1964 and the Hertzog Prize for Kroniek van Perdepoort in 1975. Also received the Scheepers Prize for Youth literature 1968, WA Hofmeyr Prize 1971, CNA Prize 1975 and again the WA Hofmeyr Prize in 1977.

== Bibliography ==
- Die onverdeelde uur, 1956
- Die koms van die komeet, 1957
- Agter my 'n Albatros, ('n reisjoenaal) 1959
- Die voortreflike familie Smit, 1962
- Twenty Days That Autumn; 21st March – 9th April 1960; a novel, 1963
- Die banneling: die lyfwag, 1964
- Oom Kolie gee raad, (drie dramas) 1965
- Díe wat met die fluite loop, 1967
- Die groot gryse, 1968
- Gesëende dag, 1969
- Kroniek van Perdepoort, 1975
- Die derde tempel, 1978
- Op die rug van die tier, 1981
- Die loop van die rivier, 1986
- Wolftyd, 1991
- Die donker kind, 1996
- Vos, 1999

== See also ==
- List of African writers
