= In My Country (2004 film) =

2004 film by John Boorman

- Film poster
- Directed by: John Boorman
- Written by: Antjie Krog; Ann Peacock
- Based on: Country of My Skull by Antjie Krog
- Produced by: John Boorman; Kieran Corrigan; Robert Chartoff; Lynn Hendee; Mike Medavoy
- Starring: Samuel L. Jackson; Juliette Binoche; Brendan Gleeson
- Cinematography: Seamus Deasy
- Edited by: Ron Davis
- Music by: Murray C. Anderson & Warrick Sony
- Production companies: Chartoff/Medavoy Productions; Phoenix Pictures
- Distributed by: Sony Pictures Classics
- Release date: 11 March 2004
- Running time: 103 minutes
- Countries: South Africa; United Kingdom; United States
- Language: English
- Budget: $12 million
- Box office: $1.4 million

In My Country is a 2004 drama film directed by John Boorman, and starring Samuel L. Jackson and Juliette Binoche. It is centred around the story of Afrikaner poet Anna Malan (Binoche) and an American journalist, Langston Whitfield (Jackson), sent to South Africa to report about the South African Truth and Reconciliation Commission hearings.

The screenplay, written by Ann Peacock, was based on Antjie Krog's memoir Country of My Skull. A special screening of the film was held for Nelson Mandela in December 2003 in the presence of John Boorman, Juliette Binoche and Robert Chartoff.

== Plot ==
The film takes place during the South African Truth and Reconciliation Commission (TRC) hearings between 1995 and 1996. The Afrikaner poet, Anna Malan is a South African broadcaster covering the Truth and Reconciliation Commission hearings. While her husband remains supportive, her work causes friction with her parents and younger brother Boetie, who are struggling to come to terms with Black majority rule. Due to increasing crime and cattle rustling, Malan's family are uncertain about their place in post–Apartheid South Africa.

While attending a press conference in Cape Town, Anna meets up with her black colleague, the sound engineer Dumi Mkhalipi. She also encounters the African American journalist Langston Whitfield, who has been sent by The Washington Post to interview the former South African Army Colonel De Jager, who has been accused of human rights violations. While initially hostile towards White South Africans, particularly Afrikaners, Whitfield forges a working relationship with Anna and Dumi.

Anna, Dumi, and Langston travel the country covering the Truth and Reconciliation Commission's hearings. The hearings are predicated around the concepts of restorative justice and Ubuntu; the belief that a universal bond connects all humanity. The TRC involve victims testifying about their experiences and perpetrators confessing to their crimes in return for an offer of amnesty. While most of the perpetrators are white and victims are black, one hearing involves a group of black guerrillas who killed members of a white farming family. Due to the African American experience with racism in the United States and the unrepentant behavior of several perpetrators, Whitfield is initially dismissive of Ubuntu.

During the course of their work, Whitfield befriends Dumi and Anna. When their car breaks down in the gramadeolas, Anna and her colleagues are forced to spend the night together at the home of an Afrikaner farmer. Despite their philosophical differences, Anna and Whitfield come to develop romantic feelings for each other. Besides covering the TRC hearings, Whitfield also interviews De Jager, an unrepentant racist who claims that he was following orders but believes that he has been made a scapegoat by the South African government.

Frustrated with the Washington Post's reluctance to highlight the TRC hearings, Whitfield writes a sensationalist article laden with incendiary rhetoric. While the article is published in the front page of the Washington Post, Anna is furious and argues with Whitfield. The two later reconcile after Anna convinces him that not all whites are guilty of the crimes of the Apartheid regime. Anna later introduces Whitfield to her parents, who help him to reevaluate his views of South African society. While interviewing De Jager, Whitfield convinces him to incriminate his superiors, which he does in return for a possible amnesty offer from the TRC, and to get revenge for their scapegoating of him.

Using De Jager's information, Langston and Anna discover a farm near Anna's family homestead which was used by the South African military to torture and kill African National Congress guerrillas. The two also discover the corpse of a former guerrilla. As a result of this discovery, De Jager is able to incriminate his superiors. However, his application for amnesty is rejected on the grounds that his actions were "disproportionate to the objective sought." Before being led away, De Jager tells Anna to ask her brother about the atrocities.

When Anna confronts Boetie about his complicity in the tortures, Boetie commits suicide. Following the funeral, Anna's mother confesses to an extramarital affair with a Chilean poet. This leads Anna to confess to her romantic affair with Langston to her husband. While initially angry, Anna's husband finds the power to forgive his wife. Anna and Langston depart on friendly terms. While Langston is driving with Dumi to visit his family, Dumi is killed by a gang of men in revenge for his prior actions as an informer who betrayed people who the police arrested and murdered, despite Dumi's claims that he only did so because the police threatened his family. This murder leads Langston to reflect on the importance of forgiveness. Meanwhile, Anna reflects on the sins of her people and pleads for the land to forgive them.

The postscript mentions that 21,800 victims testified to the Truth and Reconciliation Commission and that 1,165 perpetrators received amnesty under the peace process.

== Cast ==
- Juliette Binoche as Anna Malan
- Samuel L. Jackson as Langston Whitfield
- Brendan Gleeson as De Jager
- Menzi Ngubane as Dumi Mkhalipi
- Aletta Bezuidenhout as Elsa
- Lionel Newton as Edward Morgan
- Langley Kirkwood as Boetie
- Owen Sejake as Reverend Mzondo
- Charley Boorman as Adam Hartley
- Connie Chiume as Virginia Tabata

== Production ==
Filming took place in and around Cape Town and the Cape Peninsula. Capetonians and travellers familiar with the city will recognise several well-known land-marks co-opted to represent scenes within the film:

- The South African Museum, The Gardens, Cape Town
- Tuinhuis
- Table Mountain
- The Countryside and surrounds of Paarl and Malmesbury.
- Mount Nelson Hotel
- Locations in Stellenbosch.

== Reception ==
Nelson Mandela liked the film, and provided producers with a quote for promotion of the film:

A beautiful and important film about South Africa's Truth and Reconciliation Commission. It will engage and influence not only South Africans, but people all over the world concerned with the great questions of human reconciliation, forgiveness, and tolerance.

While the film was thought to have its "heart and politics in the right place", the Washington Post described it as a "formula romance", in which Binoche fails at the Afrikaans accent and Jackson's character lacks credibility as a Post reporter. The film received much criticism for the inclusion of a love affair, and its depiction of black South Africans.

== Awards ==
Berlin Film Festival 2004

- Winner of Diamond Cinema for Peace Award 2004.
