= Ahmed Essop =

Indian-born South African author (1931–2019)

- Born: 1 September 1931; Dabhel, India
- Died: 9 June 2019 (aged 87)
- Education: University of South Africa
- Writing career
- Notable awards: Olive Schreiner Prize

Ahmed Essop (1 September 1931 – 9 June 2019) was an Indian-born South African author.

== Biography ==
He attended the University of South Africa, where he obtained a BA in 1956 and later an honours degree.

Employed as a teacher until 1986, Essop gave up teaching to pursue writing full-time. Much of his work focuses on Indians and their roles in South African society, and include racial themes of apartheid.

Ahmed Essop died on 9 June 2019.

== Writings ==
- The Dark Goddess (1959) (as Ahmed Yousuf)
- The Visitation (1979)
- The Emperor (1984)
- The Hajji and Other Stories (1978)
- Noorjehan and Other Stories (1990)
- The King of Hearts and Other Stories (1997)
- The Third Prophecy (2004)
- History and Satire in Salman Rushdie's The Satanic Verses (2009)
- The Universe and Other Essays (2010)
- Exile and Other Poems (2010)
- The Moors in the Plays of Shakespeare (2011)
- The Garden of Shahrazad and Other Poems (2011)
- Charles Dickens and Salman Rushdie: A Comparative Discourse (2014)

== Awards ==
Essop was awarded the Olive Schreiner Prize in 1979 by the English Academy of Southern Africa for The Hajji and Other Stories (1978) and the Literary Lifetime Achievement Award by the South African Ministry of Arts and Culture.
