= Shabbir Banoobhai =

South African poet

Shabbir Banoobhai (born 23 October 1949) is a South African poet.

== Biography ==
He was born in Durban and, after school wanted to study at University. The costs were prohibitive, and instead he studied to become a teacher at Springfield College. He was elected President of the Student's Representative Council in 1970, and became assistant editor of the college newspaper, Aspect, which was occasionally banned for its protests against the apartheid state.

At college, he met Fatima Meer, who, after finding out he wrote poetry, suggested he meet with the prominent poet Douglas Livingstone.

While still at college, he successfully studied for a Bachelor of Commerce Degree through Unisa, the correspondence university, and after a short stint of teaching, he began work as an accountant.

In his own words, his work aims "to promote a vision of a more humane society – a society that not only respects all its members as human beings but which considers them as spiritual beings and essentially divine".

== Poetry ==
- echoes of my other self (1980)
- shadows of a sun-darkened land (1984)
- inward moon - outward sun (2002)
- lightmail (2002)
- book of songs (2004)
- lyrics in paradise (2009)
- dark light - the spirit's secret (2009)
- the drums beat all night (2013)
- all that remains (2020)
- in the last port of call (2022)

== Other works ==
- wisdom in a jug: reflections of love (1999)
- if i could write - Ramadan letters that can be read at Christmas or on any other day (2006)
- water would suffice: reflections of love (2007)
- a mountain is an upside down valley (2008)
- the mirror's memory - reflective essays and thoughts (2009)
- Heretic - a novel (2012)
- Seeing Perfection - meditations for living in peace (2013)
- Leadership as Healing (2017)
- Leadership as Healing Workbook (2018)
- Pathways of Love (2022)
