= Finuala Dowling =

South African poet and writer

- Born: June 1962 (age 64); Cape Town, South Africa
- Occupations: Poet, Writer, Lecturer, Editor

Finuala Dowling (born June 1962) is a South African poet and writer.

== Biography ==
The seventh of eight children born to radio broadcasters Eve van der Byl and Paddy Dowling, Finuala Dowling obtained an MA in English from the University of Cape Town (UCT), and a D.Litt. from the University of South Africa (UNISA), where she lectured in English for eight years.

Her first poetry anthology, I Flying, was published in 2002 and won the Ingrid Jonker Prize. She has also won the Sanlam Award for Poetry and the Olive Schreiner Prize. She won the 2012 M-Net Literary Award (English category) for Homemaking for the Down-at-Heart.

With Tessa and Cara Dowling she has set up an entertainment company, Dowling Sisters Productions.

== Family ==
Dowling lives in Kalk Bay, Cape Town with her daughter Beatrice, who also writes poetry.

== Publications ==
=== Poetry ===
- I Flying, Carapace (2002)
- Doo-Wop Girls of the Universe, Penguin (2006)
- Notes from the Dementia Ward, Kwela Books/Snailpress (2008)
- Pretend You Don't Know Me: New and Selected Poems, Bloodaxe Books (2018)

=== Novels ===
- What Poets Need, Penguin (2005)
- Flyleaf, Penguin (2007)
- Homemaking for the Down-at-Heart, Kwela Books (2011)
- The Fetch, Kwela Books (2015)
- Okay, Okay, Okay, Kwela Books (2019)
- The Man Who Loved Crocodile Tamers (2022) (Featuring the "female fakir" Koringa)

=== Appearances in anthologies ===
- Portraits of African Writers, ed. George Hallett, Wits University Press (2006)
- Lovely Beyond Any Singing: Landscape in South African Literature, Helen Moffett, Double Storey (2006)

== Awards ==
- Ingrid Jonker Prize for I Flying (2004)
- Sanlam Award for Poetry for Doo-Wop Girls of the Universe (2006)
- Olive Schreiner Prize for Notes from the Dementia Ward (2010)
- M-Net Literary Award (English category) for Homemaking for the Down-at-Heart (2012)
- Herman Charles Bosman Award for The Fetch
