= Kelwyn Sole =

South African poet and academic (born 1951)

Kelwayn Sole
- Born: 1951 (age 74–75); Johannesburg, South Africa
- Education: University of the Witwatersrand; School of Oriental and African Studies, University of London
- Occupations: Poet and academic

Kelwyn Sole (born 1951) is a South African poet and academic.

Sole graduated with honours in English from the University of the Witwatersrand and, following that, he was awarded an MA degree by the University of London's School of Oriental and African Studies.

Reluctant to return to apartheid South Africa, Sole initially taught in Kanye, Botswana, before returning to South Africa to co-edit the literary journal Donga. After stints in Windhoek and Johannesburg, where he completed a PhD in on the subject of the South African Black Consciousness Movement of the 1970s, Sole was appointed in 1987 by the University of Cape Town where, as of 2015, he is the chair of English Literature.

He has published numerous poetry anthologies and has won a number of literary awards.

== Poetry ==
- The Blood of Our Silence, Ravan, Johannesburg, 1988
- Projections in the Past Tense, Ravan, Johannesburg, 1992
- Love That is Night, Gecko, Durban, 1998
- Mirror and Water Gazing, Gecko, Durban, 2001
- Land Dreaming, University of Kwazulu-Natal Press, Pietermaritzburg, 2006
- "Absent Tongues", Hands-On Books, Cape Town, 2012
- Walking, Falling, Deep South, 2017

== Awards ==
- 2020: DALRO Award (co-winner) for Poetry
- 2018: South African Literary Award (SALA) for Poetry
- 2012: Thomas Pringle Award for Poetry
- 2001: University of Cape Town (Faculty of Humanities) Merit Award
- 1999: International Merit Award, Poetry 1999 Competition, Atlanta Review
- 1998: Thomas Pringle Award for Best Literary Article, English Academy of Southern Africa
- 1994: Sydney Clouts Prize for Poetry
- 1991: Hugh MacDiarmid Prize
- 1989: Olive Schreiner Prize for Poetry
