= Patrick Cullinan =

South African poet

Patrick Roland Cullinan
- Born: 25 May 1933; Pretoria, South Africa
- Died: 14 April 2011 (aged 77); Cape Town, South Africa
- Education: Magdalen College, University of Oxford
- Occupations: Poet, biographer
- Relatives: Sir Thomas Cullinan (grandfather)

Patrick Roland Cullinan (21 May 1932 – 14 April 2011) was a South African poet and biographer.

== Biography ==
Patrick Cullinan was born in Pretoria into a significant diamond-mining family (his grandfather, Sir Thomas Cullinan, a diamond mine owner, gave his name to the Cullinan Diamond). Patrick attended Charterhouse School and Magdalen College, University of Oxford in England (where he read Italian and Russian).

After his studies, he returned to South Africa, where he worked as a sawmill owner and farmer in the Eastern Transvaal. With Lionel Abrahams, he founded the Bateleur Press in 1974, and the literary journal The Bloody Horse: Writings and the Arts in 1980. Through the journal (the title taken from a poem by Roy Campbell), Cullinan sought to re-establish the standing of poetry in South Africa. His influences included John Betjeman, W. B. Yeats, Eugenio Montale, Rimbaud, and Dante.

== Collections ==
Cullinan's poetry collections include The Horizon Forty Miles Away (1973), Today Is Not Different (1978), The White Hail in the Orchard (1984) and Selected Poems 1961 – 1991 (1992). The volume The White Hail in the Orchard contains what Cullinan called "versions", by which he meant loose translations from the Italian poetry of Eugenio Montale.

Cullinan's poetry, often (in his earlier works) permeated by the Transvaal landscape, is most often concerned with the personal rather than the political; with emotional and metaphysical themes, such as his poem "My Predawn Owl". Exemplified by this poem, his work is carefully crafted, often lyrical, and at one with the tradition of W. B. Yeats. His work draws from the cultural tradition inspired by major figures such as Dante and Eugenio Montale. While he was inspired and informed by such European tradition, Cullinan firmly identified himself as an African writer:

I spent seven years, from the age of 14 to 21 in Europe (mainly, because I had no choice, in England), so I certainly ingested a great deal of European-ness. Therefore, when I came back to South Africa at the age of 21, I had a problem. Was I in fact a European, or an African? I remember sitting in a cottage in the Eastern Transvaal, on the Escarpment, thinking it through one night. When I woke up in the morning, I didn't have to think of it any longer: I was an African, and I always would be."

In addition to volumes of his poetry, Cullinan also published a biography of Robert Jacob Gordon (a Dutch traveller and soldier): Robert Jacob Gordon 1743 – 1795: The Man and His Travels at the Cape (1992), a semi-autobiographical work of prose fiction: Matrix (2002) and, in 2005, a collection of the letters of Bessie Head: The Imaginative Trespasser.

Just before his death, Cullinan published a significant new collection of his works spanning over thirty years, Escarpments.

== Apartheid ==
Cullinan accepted the fact that writers ought to have been involved in the fight against apartheid in South Africa, while acknowledging the fact that is it difficult to produce a satisfactory political poem. Criticism has been levelled at Cullinan — that his work, throughout the Apartheid years in South Africa, did not engage with "the struggle" against apartheid. In the first edition of The Bloody Horse, Cullinan wrote:

To talk of 'literature', of good writing, of art may be obscene or almost obscene in a society as self-destructing, engrossed in conflict as this one is. But the important word is almost. For however cluttered by violence and potential annihilation a society may find itself, it is the writers and the artists who portray the reality of this process... There are multiple ways of telling the truth."

This may be as good an encapsulation as any of the position of Cullinan's poetry in its political context. Cullinan believed that it was "the fanatical belief that politics is more important than art" which was slowing the process of South African poetry becoming "more sophisticated" and "less provincial": a limitation which he hoped the "New South Africa" after the first democratic elections in 1994 would remove.

== Honours ==
Cullinan won significant recognition in South Africa, and enjoys a reputation as arguably the most prominent South African poet alive at the end of the 20th century. Among the prizes he won are the Slug Award, the Olive Schreiner Prize, three Pringle Awards, the Sanlam Literary Award and the Merit Award (Cape Town Historical Society). In April 2003, the Republic of Italy conferred the title of ‘Cavaliere’ on him for his translations of Italian poetry, in particular the work of Eugenio Montale.

== Fellow poets ==
Cullinan maintained close contact with other poets writing in South Africa, notably Gus Ferguson. Before their deaths, he was a friend and fellow writer to Lionel Abrahams, Guy Butler, Douglas Livingstone and Stephen Watson.

Cullinan made a significant contribution to South African poetry through his encouragement of young writers, both through his teaching, and through his willingness to mentor, support and constructively criticise. During his time at Oxford, he was similarly mentored by John Betjeman (who became a significant correspondent,) – and so represented a unique link between a lyrical English verse tradition and following generations of English-speaking South African poets.

Prior to his retirement and his devotion to full-time writing, he lectured for many years at the University of the Western Cape. In retirement, he lived in Cape Town, South Africa.

== Bibliography ==
Poetry

- The Horizon Forty Miles Away. Polygraph (1963)
- Today is not Different. David Philip (1978)
- The White Hail in the Orchard. David Philip (1984)
- I Sing Where I Stand: Versions from the Afrikaans of Phil du Plessis: Poesie 1892–1984. Vooraand (1985)
- Selected Poems, 1961–1991. Artists' Press (1992)
- Selected Poems, 1961–1994. Snailpress (1994)
- Mantis Poets: Guy Butler/Patrick Cullinan. David Phillips Publishers (1998)
- Transformations. Snailpress (1999)
- Escarpments (Poems 1973–2007). Umuzi Random House (2008)

Anthology

- Lionel Abrahams: A Reader. (ed) Ad Donker (1988)
- Dante in South Africa. (ed with Stephen Watson) Centre for Creative Writing, University of Cape Town (2005)

Biography

- Robert Jacob Gordon 1743–1795: The Man and His Travels at the Cape. Winchester Struik (1992)
- Imaginative Trespasser: Letters from Bessie head to Patrick and Wendy Cullinan 1963-1977. Johannesburg: Wits University Press (2005). ISBN 1-86814-413-5

Novel

- Matrix. Snailpress (2002)
