= Bronwyn Law-Viljoen =

South African writer, editor, publisher and professor

- Awards: Fulbright Scholar; Olive Schreiner Prize

Academic background
- Education: Rhodes University (M.A.); New York University (Ph.D.); University of the Witwatersrand (Ph.D.)

Academic work
- Discipline: Literature

Bronwyn Law-Viljoen is a South African writer, editor, publisher and lecturer. She has a doctorate in Literature from New York University and a doctorate in Creative Writing from the University of the Witwatersrand, where she was Associate Professor and Head of the Department of Creative Writing for 12 years. She is now Associate Professor of Creative Writing at Adelaide University. She is co-founder and editor of Fourthwall Books and a former editor of Art South Africa magazine. She has published two novels, several short stories, and essays on art, literature and photography in journals, books and magazines.

== Education ==
Law-Viljoen has an MA degree (1994) from Rhodes University in South Africa, a PhD in Literature (2003) from New York University and a PhD in Creative Writing (2017) from the University of the Witwatersrand in Johannesburg, South Africa.

== Career ==
=== Author ===
Law-Viljoen's first novel, The Printmaker, was published in 2016 (Umuzi/Penguin Random House). It was shortlisted for the premier fiction prize in South Africa, the Sunday Times Barry Ronge Fiction Award, and won the 2018 English Academy of South Africa Olive Schreiner Prize. It appeared in French in 2019 (Editions Zoé). It was published in German with Akono Verlag in 2021. Her second novel, Notes on Falling was published by Umuzi/Penguin-Random House in 2022. She has also published short stories, and essays on art, literature and photography in journals, books and magazines.

=== Academic ===
Law-Viljoen is the former head of the Department of Creative Writing and the deputy head of the School of Literature, Language and Media at the University of the Witwatersrand in Johannesburg, South Africa. She is currently associate professor in Creative Writing at Adelaide University, South Australia.

=== Editor ===
Law-Viljoen was the editor of the arts magazine Art South Africa and editor-in-chief at David Krut Publishing in Johannesburg. Prior to that, she completed an internship at the independent photography publishing company, Aperture, in New York.

She is the editor and co-founder (with Oliver Barstow) of Fourthwall Books, an independent publisher of books on art and photography established in South Africa in 2010. By 2020, the company had published 41 books and won several important awards: the 2010 Jane Jacobs Best Urban Book Award (New York) for Writing the City into Being; the 2011 Antalis Paper Loves You Award for Fire Walker; the 2015 Jan Rabie Rapport Prize for Non-Fiction for Nagmusiek; the 2015 Kyknet Rapport Prize for Fiction for Nagmusiek; the 2016 Eugene Marais Prize for Nagmusiek; and the Sunday Times Alan Paton Award 2019 for Everyone is Present. Through Fourthwall Books, she has been involved in the editing and publishing of a number of authors' works, including Flute by William Kentridge, Light on a Hill with contributions by multiple architects, builders, and court judges that Law-Viljoen helped to compile, and Art and Justice on the history and conception of the constitutional court in South Africa.

She and Oliver Barstow opened an independent bookstore called Edition in Milpark, Johannesburg as an extension of their publishing company.

== Bibliography ==
=== Novels ===
- The Printmaker (2016, Umuzi/Penguin Random House), translated as Le Graveur (2019, Editions Zoé) and as Der Nachlass des Grafikers (2021, Akono Verlag).
- Notes on Falling (2022, Umuzi/Penguin Random House).

=== Books edited ===
- Fire Walker: William Kentridge, Gerhard Marx (with Oliver Barstow, 2011, Fourthwall Books)
- William Kentridge Nose: Thirty Etchings (2010, David Krut Publishing)
- Art and Justice: The Art of the Constitutional Court of South Africa (2008, David Krut Publishing)
- William Kentridge Flute (2007, David Krut Publishing)
- Light on a Hill: Building the Constitutional Court of South Africa (2006, David Krut Publishing)
- William Kentridge Prints (2006, David Krut Publishing)

== Awards and honours ==
- 2018: Olive Schreiner Prize from the English Academy of South Africa, for The Printmaker
- 2017: The Printmaker shortlisted for the Sunday Times Barry Ronge Fiction Award
- 2001: Americanist Molberger Prize for Literature of the Transition
- 1996–1998: Fulbright Scholarship, New York University
