= Rustum Kozain =

South African writer (born 1966)

- Born: 1966 (age 59–60); Paarl, Western Cape, South Africa
- Education: Bowling Green State University, University of Cape Town
- Occupations: poet and writer.

Rustum Kozain (born 1966) is a South African poet and writer.

== Life ==
Kozain was born in Paarl. After he matriculated, he studied at the University of Cape Town. During this time, he focused his PhD research on selected South Africa poetry in English from 1970 to 1990. In 1994 and 1995 he attended Bowling Green State University in Ohio, United States on a Fulbright Scholarship. From 1998 to 2004 he was a lecturer at the University of Cape Town.

In addition to two collections of poetry, he has also published reviews, essays and short fiction. Further writing can be found on his personal web site at Groundwork.

Kozain has won a number of awards for his poetry. These include the Philip Stein Poetry Award in 1997, the Thomas Pringle Award in 2004, the Ingrid Jonker Prize for This Carting Life in 2005 and the Olive Schreiner Prize in 2007 and 2014. Kozain is one of only two writers to have won the Olive Schreiner Prize twice, the other being Zakes Mda. In fact, when he was notified that he had won the prize for a second time, Kozain thought it was a hoax.

== Works ==
- This Carting Life, Kwela Books, 2005
- The Book of Tongues, Kwela Books, 2008
- Groundwork, Kwela Books, 2012
