= Ursula Barnett =

German-South African businesswoman and literary scholar

Ursula A. Barnett (died 2016) was a German-South African businesswoman, literary scholar and political activist.

== Life ==
Ursula Barnett was born in Slovenia to Jewish parents: her father Felix Gross was a writer and journalist, and her mother Elsa Rosenblum a piano teacher and masseuse. She grew up in Berlin until the family escaped Nazism to Cape Town, South Africa. She gained a degree at Rhodes University, an MA from the University of Cape Town and she won a scholarship to study MSc in journalism from Columbia University. When her father died in 1961, she took over his business in Cape Town, the International Press Agency (Inpra).

In 1971 she gained a PhD from the University of Cape Town, on African English-language writing. She published her thesis in 1983, and in 1976 published a biography of the literary scholar Es'kia Mphahlele. In the 1970s she became an observer of youth trials in township courts on behalf of Black Sash. In 1983, with Sue Williamson and others, she helped found the Women's Movement for Peace.

Her husband died in 1986, and she moved to join her children in England in 1989. There she started a literary agency for South African writers. She also joined the ANC and was active in local anti-apartheid politics.

== Works ==
- Ezekiel Mphahlele, 1976
- A Vision of Order: A Study of Black South African Literature in English, 1914–1980, 1983
