= Isobel Dixon =

South African poet

- Born: 1969 (age 56–57); South Africa
- Occupations: Poet, literary agnt
- Awards: Olive Schreiner Prize (2004)
- Website: www.isobeldixon.com

Isobel Dixon (born 1969) is a South African poet. She is also a literary agent based in London.

== Life ==
Born and raised in South Africa and living now in Cambridge, England, Isobel Dixon Dixon is a director of the London literary agency Blake Friedmann..

She has published several poetry collections and contributed to many collaborative works and anthologies. Her poem "Plenty" now features in the CIE GCSE English Language Course as part of the poetry anthology.

In 2000, she won the South African SANLAM Award for Poetry. In 2004, she won the Olive Schreiner Prize and the Oxfam Poems for a Better Future competition. She was commissioned to write poems by the British Film Institute in 2007.

== Collections ==
- Weather Eye (Carapace, 2001)
- A Fold in the Map (Salt Publishing, 2007)
- The Tempest Prognosticator (Salt Publishing, 2011)
- The Debris Field, with Simon Barraclough and Chris McCabe (Sidekick Books, 2013)
