= Tjawangwa Dema =

Motswana poet (born 1981)

- Born: 1981 (age 44–45); Gaborone, Botswana
- Education: Lancaster University
- Occupation: Poet

Tjawangwa "TJ" Dema (born 1981) is a Motswana poet, known for her spoken word and performance poetry. Her work has been published internationally in literary journals and anthologies, and she has performed at festivals and events in over 20 countries. Her debut collection, The Careless Seamstress (2019), won the Sillerman First Book Prize for African Poets.

== Life and career ==
Dema was born in 1981 in Gaborone, Botswana. She has a master's of arts degree from Lancaster University.

Dema's chapbook, Mandible, was published as part of the 2014 boxed set Seven New Generation African Poets (edited by Kwame Dawes and Chris Abani, published by Slapering Hol Press). John Taylor, reviewing the set for The Antioch Review, said Dema's work "is especially touching in moments when intimate feelings are expressed metaphorically". She has also had work published in the Cordite Poetry Review, Elsewhere Lit, the New Orleans Review and in the anthology Read Women (Locked Horn Press, 2014).

As a performance poet she has performed at the Gaborone International Music and Culture Week, and internationally in over 20 countries including Germany, Singapore, Portugal, Sweden, and Scotland. She represented Botswana at the Poetry Parnassus in London in 2012.

In 2018 Dema received the Sillerman First Book Prize for African Poets for her collection The Careless Seamstress. The prize came with US$1,000 and publication of her collection as part of the African Poetry Book Series by the University of Nebraska Press. The collection was a Brittle Paper Notable Book of 2019.

In 2022 Dema published a collection of ecopoetry, an/another pastoral (No Bindings Press), illustrated by Tebogo Cranwell and with a foreword from Chris Abani. The collection was launched on Earth Day. It was a Brittle Paper Notable Book of 2022, described as "[combining] history and race with the climate crisis to create riveting poetry that brings an African ecopoetics perspective to our changing world".

Dema has received fellowships and residencies from the University of Iowa's International Writing Program, the Vermont Studio Center, the Danish Arts Foundation (Danish International Visiting Residence programme, 2014), and the Alice Kaplan Institute for the Humanities at Northwestern University (2016 Artist-in-Residence).
