= Alan James (poet) =

South African writer

Alan James is a South African writer, now living in Australia. A former law lecturer, and the founder of the poetry journal Upstream, he has published seven collections of poetry. In 1995, James received the Olive Schreiner Prize for Morning near Genandendal. He has more recently published two volumes of day-to-day bible readings.

== Works ==
- The Dictator (1972)
- From Bitterfontein (1974)
- At a Rail Halt (1981)
- Producing the Landscape (1987)
- Morning Near Genadendal (1992)
- Ferry to Robben Island (1996)
- The First Bushman's Path: Stories, Songs and Testimonies of the /Xam of the northern Cape: versions with commentary (2001)
- "They will call him Immanuel" (2017)
- "The Messiah must suffer and rise" (2017)
