= Snail Press Publications =

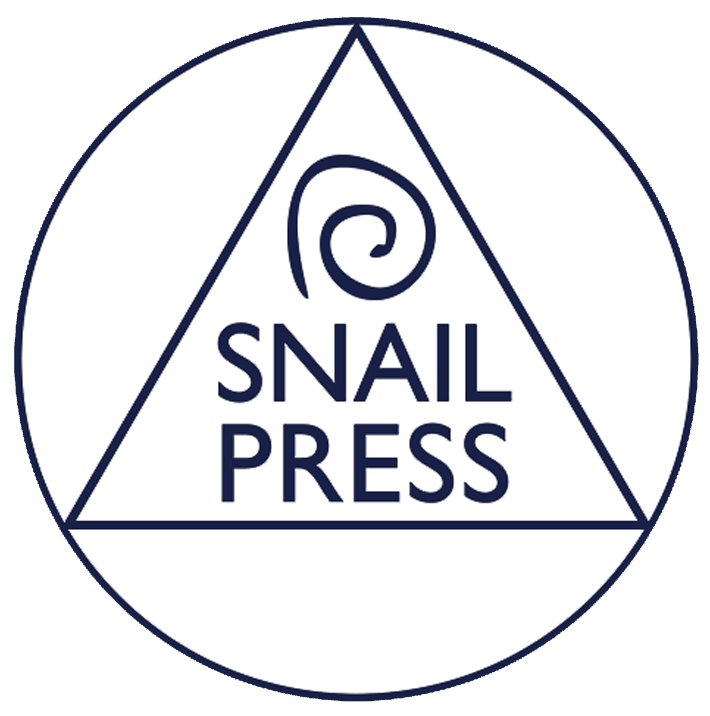
- Founded: 2010
- Founder: Zelda Nader
- Country of origin: United States of America
- Headquarters location: Los Angeles
- Publication types: Books
- Official website: snailpress.com

Snail Press Publications is an independent publishing company based in Los Angeles that specializes in limited edition fine art books, poetry and literature.

Founded in 2010 by Zelda Nader.

In 2010, the first publication was a large hardcover art book entitled “Insouciance,” which featured selected works from fine artist America Martin. The next project, "The Enthusiast," was a double-sided paperback book of poems by author and filmmaker Noah Gershman. In 2013, Snail Press will produce another large hardcover art book from America Martin entitled, "YES," with selected works from 2009 to 2012, and a hardcover slipcase book entitled "Green Candle," a series of essays by playwright Brian Torrey Scott. In 2014, "In the Wake of Sydney Jack" will be released, a non-linear series of short stories of Southern humor and tragedy by Thom Thinn.
