= Don Maclennan =

South African poet and academic (1929–2009)

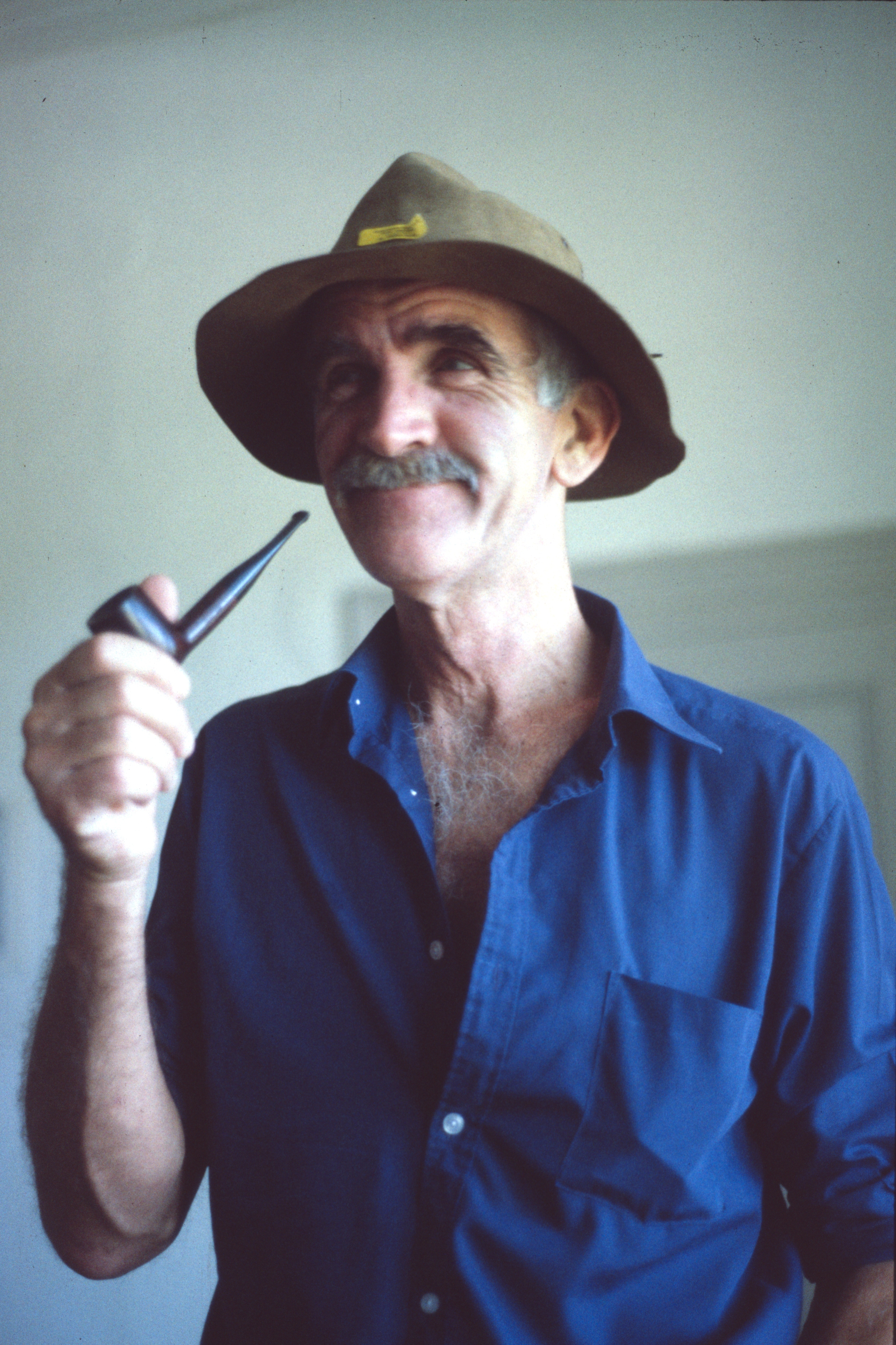
Don Maclennan in 1984

Donald Alasdair Calum Maclennan (9 December 1929 – 9 February 2009) was a South African poet, critic, playwright and English professor.

He published a number of plays, short stories, collections of poems and scholarly works.

Born on 9 December 1929, in London, England, Maclennan came to South Africa as a child in 1938. He was educated at Witwatersrand University and Edinburgh University.

Maclennan's academic career included lecturing at Wits University and the University of Cape Town. He taught in both South Africa and the United States. He began teaching at Rhodes University in 1966, teaching English there for more than 40 years, although he officially retired in 1994. In later years, he continued to teach at the university, giving weekly seminars for another decade.

In his final years, he self-published a number of works of poetry. In his last decade, Maclennan had motor-neuron disease. He suffered a stroke in January 2009, although his mind was not affected by it. He died on 9 February 2009, in Port Elizabeth.

== Bibliography ==
Years link to corresponding "[year] in poetry" article for poetry; for literature, to corresponding "[year] in literature" article:

=== Poetry ===
- 1971: In Memoriam Oskar Wolberheim, A.A. Balkema, combining Maclennan's poetry and the music of Norbert Nowotny
- 1977: Life Songs, Bateleur Press
- Bateleur Poets, ISBN 978-0-620-02281-1
- 1983: Reckonings, New Africa Books, ISBN 978-0-908396-95-5
- 1988: Collecting Darkness, Justified Press, ISBN 978-0-9474510-3-5
- 1992: Letters: New Poems, Carrefour Press, ISBN 978-0-9583178-7-0
- 1995: The Poetry Lesson: New Poems Snailpress, ISBN 978-1-874923-25-1
- 1997: Solstice: Poems, ISBN 978-1-874923-40-4, winner of South Africa's Sanlam Literary Award for 1997
- 1998: Of Women and Some Men with George Coutouvidis, Firfield Poetry Press, ISBN 978-1-875058-16-7
- 2001:
  - Notes from a Rhenish Mission, Firfield Press, ISBN 978-1-875058-17-4
  - A Brief History of Madness in the Eastern Cape, with drawings by Siddis Firfield, Firfield Press, ISBN 978-1-875058-17-4
- 2002: Rock paintings at Salem, self-published, Rhodes University GSU
- 2002: The Road to Kromdraai, Publisher Snailpress, ISBN 978-1-874923-63-3
- 2003: The Dinner Party, self-published, Rhodes University GSU
- 2003: A Letter to William Blake, self-published, Rhodes University GSU
- 2003: Under Compassberg, self-published, Rhodes University GSU
- 2004: Excavations, self-published, Rhodes University GSU
- 2005: Reading the Signs, Carapace
- 2006: The necessary salt, self-published, Rhodes University GSU
- 2006: Selected Poems, Quartz Press
- 2007: The owl of Minerva, self-published, Rhodes University GSU
- 2008: Through a Glass Darkly, self-published, Rhodes University GSU
- 2010: Dress Rehearsal, self-published, Rhodes University GSU
- 2012: Collected Poems, Print Matters Heritage Press (ed. Dan Wylie) ISBN 978-0-987009562

=== Other works ===
- An Enquiry into the Voyage of the Santiago, a play
- Job Mava, a play, written and performed in 1972/3 by The Ikhwezi Players, published 1981/2
- My Childhood, adaptation of Maxim Gorky's play, performed in 1975 by The Ikhwezi Players
- 2004: Editor, with Malcolm Hacksley, A Ruthless Fidelity: Collected Poems of Douglas Livingstone, publisher: Ad Donker, ISBN 978-0-86852-232-6
- Olive Schreiner and After: Essays on Southern African Literature in Honour of Guy Butler Publisher: D. Philip, ISBN 978-0-908396-92-4
- Sarah Christie, Don Maclennan, Geoffrey Hutchings, Perspectives on South African Fiction, Publisher Ad. Donker, ISBN 978-0-949937-74-2
