= Lionel Abrahams =

South African novelist, poet, editor, critic, essayist and publisher (1928–2004)

- Born: 11 April 1928; Pretoria, South Africa
- Died: 31 May 2004 (aged 76)
- Occupation: Poet

Lionel Abrahams (11 April 1928 – 31 May 2004) was a South African novelist, poet, editor, critic, essayist and publisher. He was born in Johannesburg, where he lived his entire life. He was born with cerebral palsy and had to use a wheelchair until 11 years of age.

Best known for his poetry, he was mentored by Herman Charles Bosman, and later edited seven volumes of Bosman's posthumously published works. Abrahams went on to become one of the most influential figures in South African literature in his own right, publishing numerous poems, essays, and two novels. Through Renoster Books, which he started in 1956, he published works by Oswald Mtshali and Mongane Wally Serote heralding the emergence of black poetry during the apartheid era.

An account of his important role in introducing black writers to PEN is given by his close friend, the writer Jillian Becker

In 1986, he married Jane Fox. That year, he was awarded honorary doctorates of literature by the University of the Witwatersrand and the University of Natal.

== Novels ==
- The Celibacy of Felix Greenspan: A novel in 18 stories, published by Bateleur Press, 1977
- The White Life of Felix Greenspan, published by M&G Books, 2002

== Poetry ==
- Journal of a New Man, published by Ad Donker, 1984
- The Writer in Sand, published by Ad Donker, 1988
- A Dead Tree Full of Live Birds, published by Snail Press, 1988
- Chaos Theory of the Heart, published by Jacana Media, 2005
- To Halley's Comet, publishers unknown.

== Works about Lionel Abrahams ==
- Lionel Abrahams: A Reader, ed. Patrick Cullinan, published by Ad Donker, 1988
- A Writer in Stone: South African Writers Celebrate the 70th Birthday of Lionel Abrahams, ed. G. Friedman and Roy Blumenthal, published by David Philip, 1998
