= Douglas Livingstone (poet) =

South African poet (1932–1996)

Douglas Livingstone (5 January 1932 – 19 February 1996) was a South African poet.

He was born in Kuala Lumpur, but his family moved to Natal after his father was taken prisoner during the Japanese invasion of Malaya. He attended Kearsney College and in 1964, he started work as a marine biologist in Durban. He gained two doctorates from the University of Natal; one for his scientific work and an honorary one for his poetry.

== Poetry ==
- The Skull in the Mud (1960)
- Sjambok and Other Poems from Africa (1964)
- Poems (with Thomas Kinsella and Anne Sexton, 1968)
- Eyes Closed Against the Sun (1970)
- A Rosary of Bone (1975)
- The Anvil's Undertone (1978)
- Selected Poems (1984)
- A Littoral Zone (1991)
- Giovanni Jacopo Meditates on the High-IQ Haiku (1995)
- A Ruthless Fidelity—Collected Poems of Douglas Livingstone (2004)
- Lake morning in autumn

== Translations ==
- Eight Shona Poems (with Phillipa Berlyn)
- Wilson Chivaura (with Phillipa Berlyn)
- Gentling a Wildcat

== Plays ==
- The Sea My Winding Sheet (1964)
- A Rhino for the Boardroom (1974)
- The Semblance of the Real (1984)
