= List of South African writers =

This is a list of writers from South Africa.

== A ==
- Lionel Abrahams (1928–2004)
- Peter Abrahams (1919–2017)
- Rehane Abrahams (born 1970)
- Wilna Adriaanse (born 1958)
- Tatamkulu Afrika (1920–2002), born in Egypt
- Lawrence Anthony (1950–2012)
- Hennie Aucamp (1934–2014)
- Diane Awerbuck (born 1974)

== B ==
- C. Johan Bakkes (born 1956)
- Christiaan Bakkes (born 1965)
- Margaret Bakkes (1931–2016)
- Jillian Becker (born 1932)
- Shabbir Banoobhai (born 1949)
- Lady Anne Barnard (1750–1825)
- Lesley Beake (born 1949)
- Mark Behr (born 1963), South Africa/Tanzania
- Dricky Beukes (1918–1999)
- Lauren Beukes (born 1976)
- Steve Biko (1946–1977)
- Troy Blacklaws (born 1965)
- François Bloemhof (born 1962)
- Elleke Boehmer (born 1961)
- Dugmore Boetie (c.1924–1966)
- Stella Blakemore (1906–1991)
- William Bolitho (1891–1930)
- Diphete Bopape (born 1957)
- Herman Charles Bosman (1905–1951)
- Alba Bouwer (1920–2010)
- Johanna Brandt (1876–1964)
- Breyten Breytenbach (1939–2024)
- André Brink (1935–2015)
- Babette Brown (1931–2019)
- Dennis Brutus (1924–2009)
- Guy Butler (1918–2001)

== C–D ==
- Roy Campbell (1901–1957)
- Cecile Cilliers (1933–2018)
- Stuart Cloete (1897–1976)
- J. M. Coetzee (born 1940), awarded 2003 Nobel Prize in Literature
- Bryce Courtenay (1933–2012)
- Jeremy Cronin (born 1949)
- Patrick Cullinan (1932–2011)
- Achmat Dangor (1948–2020)
- Ingrid de Kok (born 1951)
- Phillippa Yaa de Villiers (born 1966)
- Rolfes Robert Reginald Dhlomo (1901–1971)
- Finuala Dowling (born 1962)
- Zebulon Dread (living)
- K. Sello Duiker (1974–2005)

== E–G ==
- Tony Eprile (born 1955), lives in the United States
- Ahmed Essop (1931–2019), born in India, grew up in Johannesburg
- Elisabeth Eybers (1915–2007)
- Mary Faulkner (1903–1973)
- Melinda Ferguson
- Ruth First (1925–1982)
- Sir Percy FitzPatrick (1862–1931)
- Charles J. Fourie (born 1965)
- Neville Frankel (born 1948)
- Lynn Freed (born 1945)
- Dave Freer (born 1959)
- Graeme Friedman
- Stacey Fru (born 2007)
- Athol Fugard (1932–2025)
- Sheila Fugard (born 1932), born in England
- Damon Galgut (born 1963)
- Nadine Gordimer (1923–2014), awarded 1991 Nobel Prize in Literature
- Khaya Gqibitole
- Stephen Gray (1941–2020)
- Michael Cawood Green (born 1954)
- Mafika Gwala (1946–2014)
- Emmanuel Sithole (born 2003)

== H–J ==
- Megan Hall (born 1972)
- Joan Hambidge (born 1956)
- Bessie Head (1937–1986), born in South Africa, mainly in Botswana
- Cat Hellisen (born 1977)
- Manu Herbstein (born 1936)
- Christopher Hope (born 1944)
- Emma Huismans (born 1947)
- Robin Hyde (1906–1939), born in South Africa, living in New Zealand writer
- Mhlobo Jadezweni (born 1954)
- Karen Jennings (author) (born 1982)
- Ingrid Jonker (1933–1965)
- Archibald Campbell Jordan (1906–1968)
- Elsa Joubert (1922–2020)
- Gideon Joubert (1923–2010)
- Amy Jephta (born 1987)

== K–L ==
- Harry Kalmer (1956–2019)
- John Christoffel Kannemeyer (1939–2011)
- Farida Karodia (born 1942)
- Anne Kellas (born 1951), also connected with Australia
- Keorapetse Kgositsile (1938–2018)
- Fred Khumalo (born 1966)
- Robert Kirby (1936–2007)
- Antjie Krog (born 1952)
- Mazisi Kunene (1930–2006)
- Richard Kunzmann (born 1976)
- Ellen Kuzwayo (1914–2006)
- Alex La Guma (1925–1985)
- David Lambkin (born 1947), born in the United Kingdom
- Anne Landsman (born 1959)
- Mandla Langa (born 1950)
- C.J. Langenhoven (1873–1932)
- Greg Lazarus
- Etienne Leroux (1922–1989)
- Christine Barkhuizen le Roux (1959–2020)
- Steve Linde (born 1960), newspaperman
- Douglas Livingstone (1932–1996), born in Malaysia
- Anna M. Louw (1913–2003)

== M ==
- M.E.R. (1875–1975)
- Rozena Maart (born 1962)
- E. S. Madima
- Tenda Madima
- Sindiwe Magona (born 1943)
- Arthur Maimane (1932–2005)
- Caesarina Kona Makhoere (born 1955)
- Angela Makholwa (born 1976)
- Lucas Malan (1946–2010)
- Rian Malan (born 1954)
- JB Malatji
- Nelson Mandela (1918–2013)
- Nozibele Mayaba
- Eugène Marais (1871–1936)
- Mohale Mashigo (born 1983)
- John Mateer (born 1971), also tied to Australia
- Mark Mathabane (born 1960)
- Todd Matshikiza (1921–1968)
- Don Mattera (1935–2022)
- Dalene Matthee (1938–2005)
- James McClure (1939–2006)
- Michelle McGrane (born 1974), born in Zimbabwe
- Zakes Mda (born 1948)
- Joan Metelerkamp (born 1956)
- Deon Meyer (born 1958)
- Thando Mgqolozana (born 1983)
- Niq Mhlongo (born 1973)
- Gcina Mhlophe (born 1959)
- Kirsten Miller
- Amitabh Mitra
- Bloke Modisane (1924–1986)
- Natalia Molebatsi
- Casey Motsisi (1932–1977)
- Phaswane Mpe (1970–2004)
- Es'kia (Ezekiel) Mphahlele (1919–2008)
- Samuel E. K. Mqhayi (1875–1945)
- Lidudumalingani Mqombothi
- Oswald Mtshali (born 1940)
- Ena Murray (1936–2015)
- Vusamazulu Credo Mutwa (1921–2020)

== N–R ==
- Njabulo Ndebele (born 1948)
- Lauretta Ngcobo (1931–2015)
- Christopher Robert Nicholson (born 1945)
- J.J. Ncongwane (born 1961)
- Lisa de Nikolits
- Lewis Nkosi (1936–2010)
- Arthur Nortje (1942–1970)
- Masande Ntshanga (born 1986)
- Sibusiso Nyembezi (1919–2000)
- Joy Packer (1905–1977)
- Raj Patel (born 1972)
- Alan Paton (1903–1988)
- Phumlani Pikoli (1988–2021)
- Sol T. Plaatje (1876–1932)
- Christine Qunta (born 1952)
- Jan Rabie (1920–2001)
- Mary Renault (1905–1983) (immigrated to South Africa 1948)
- Richard Rive (1931–1989)
- Dan Roodt (born 1957)
- Daphne Rooke (1914–2009)
- Henrietta Rose-Innes (born 1971)
- Eric Rosenthal (1905–1983)

== S ==
- Riana Scheepers (born 1957)
- Karel Schoeman (1939–2017)
- Alan Scholefield (1931–2017)
- Patricia Schonstein (born 1952)
- Olive Schreiner (1855–1920)
- Sipho Sepamla (1932–2007)
- Mongane Wally Serote (born 1944)
- Ishtiyaq Shukri (born 1968)
- Barney Simon (1932-1995)
- Gillian Slovo (born 1952)
- Adam Small (1936–2016)
- Russell Smith (born 1963), raised and living in Canada
- Wilbur Smith (1932–2021)
- Jason Staggie (born 1984)
- Willem Steenkamp
- Sylvester Stein (1920–2015)
- Jonny Steinberg (born 1970)
- Cynthia Stockley (1873–1936)
- Harold Strachan (1925–2020)
- Barry Streek (1948–2006)

== T–V ==
- Can Themba (1924–1969)
- Miriam Tlali (1933–2017)
- J. R. R. Tolkien (1892–1973), Orange Free State/England
- John van de Ruit (born 1975)
- Sir Laurens van der Post (1906–1996)
- Etienne van Heerden (born 1956)
- John van Melle (1887–1953), born in the Netherlands
- Marlene van Niekerk (born 1954)
- Charles van Onselen
- Christopher van Wyk (1957–2014)
- F.A. Venter (1916–1997)
- Nicolaas Vergunst (born 1958)
- Benedict Vilakazi (1906–1947)
- Lettie Viljoen (born 1948)
- Anna de Villiers (1900–1979)
- A.G. Visser (1878–1929)
- Wayne Visser (born 1970)
- Ivan Vladislavic (born 1957)
- Gert Vlok Nel (born 1963)
- Eugène Terre'Blanche (1941–2010)

== W–Z ==
- Alf Wannenburgh (1936–2010)
- Zukiswa Wanner (born 1976)
- Lyall Watson (1939–2008)
- Mary Watson (born 1975)
- Stephen Watson (1955–2011)
- Zoë Wicomb (1948–2025)
- Mark Winkler (born 1966)
- David Yudelman
- Rachel Zadok (born 1972), now based in London
- Rose Zwi (1928–2018), born in Mexico

== See also ==
- List of African writers by country
- Amstel Playwright of the Year Award
- South African literature
- South African poetry
- List of poets
- List of South African poets
