= Madima =

Madima is a surname. Notable people with the surname include:

- E. S. Madima, South African writer
- Tenda Madima, South African writer
