= Lambkin =

Lambkin is a dialect term for a young lamb.

Lambkin may refer to:

- Lamkin, Child Ballad
- Lambkin cat, an experimental dwarf cat breed with a curly coat
- The Lambkin (1881–1900), British racehorse
- Lambkin, mascot of Fort Collins High School

== People with the name ==
- David Lambkin, an English novelist
- Deborah Lambkin (born 1970), an Irish botanical artist
- Marcus Lambkin (born 1971), known as Shit Robot, Irish electronic musician and DJ
