= Douglas Fisher (Royal Navy officer) =

Royal Navy Admiral (1890–1963)

Admiral Sir Douglas Fisher KCB KBE
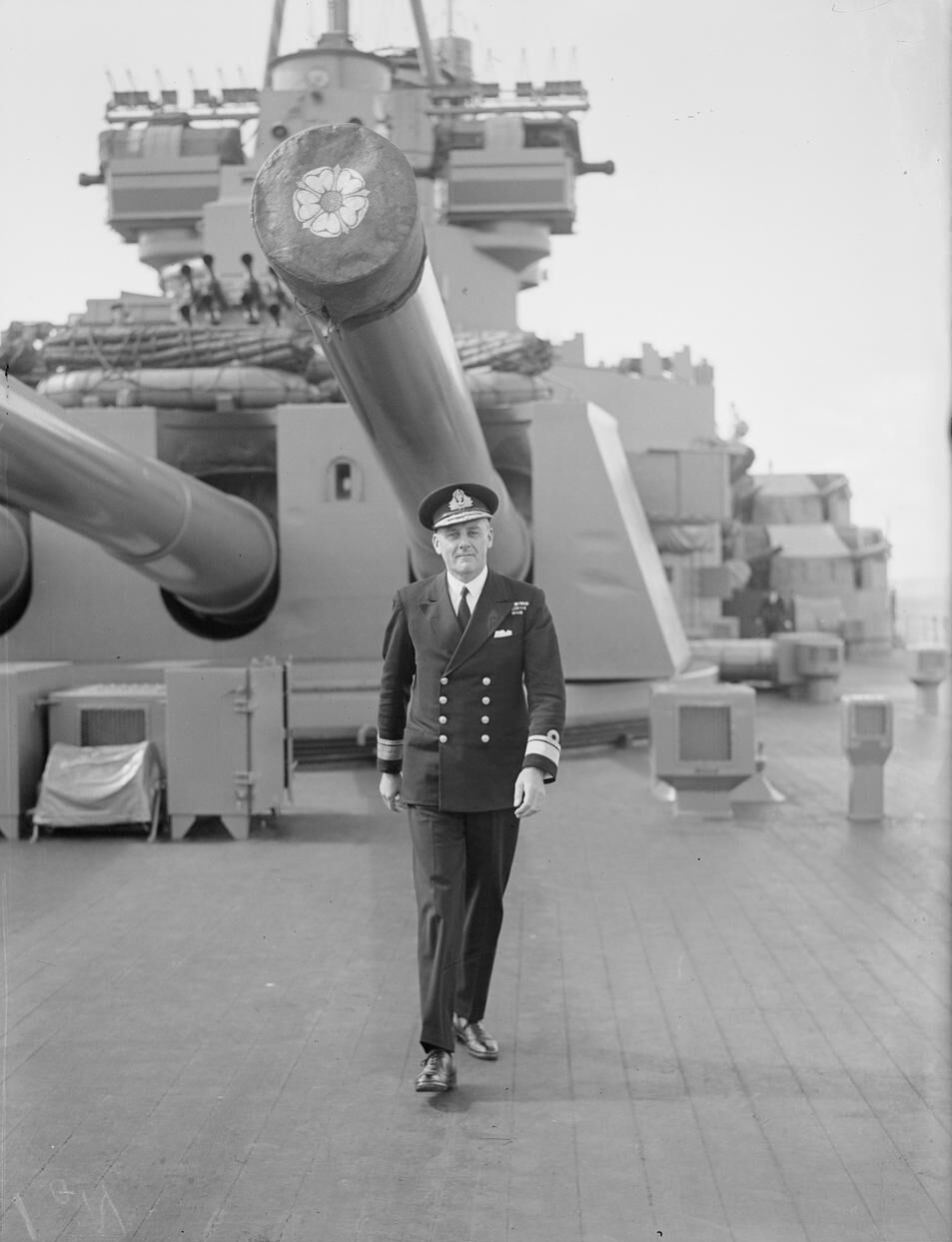
- Rear Admiral Fisher on the quarterdeck of HMS Duke of York, October 1942
- Born: 23 October 1890
- Died: 4 October 1963 (aged 72)
- Military career
- Allegiance: United Kingdom
- Branch: Royal Navy
- Service years: 1907–1949
- Rank: Admiral
- Commands: HMS Warspite
- Conflicts: World War I World War II
- Awards: Knight Commander of the Order of the Bath; Knight Commander of the Order of the British Empire

Admiral Sir Douglas Blake Fisher KCB KBE (23 October 1890 – 4 October 1963) was a Royal Navy officer who went on to be Fourth Sea Lord.

== Naval career ==
Fisher joined the Royal Navy as a Midshipman in 1907, was promoted to lieutenant in 1912, and served in World War I. He was mentioned in despatches in 1919. He was appointed Captain of the Fleet for the Home Fleet in 1938. He also served in World War II commanding the battleship HMS Warspite from 1940 and then taking part in the Arctic Convoys from 1942 before becoming Rear Admiral, Fleet Train for the British Pacific Fleet in 1944 and then Flag Officer, Western Area, British Pacific Fleet in 1945. After the War he became Fourth Sea Lord and Chief of Supplies and Transport and then retired as a full Admiral in 1949.

== Honours ==
Fisher was appointed an Officer of the Order of the British Empire (OBE) in 1919 "For valuable services in HMS Iron Duke, Flagship of the Commander-in-Chief, Grand Fleet, and subsequently in the 1st Battle Squadron". He was promoted to Commander of the Order (CBE) in 1940, in recognition of distinguished service during the war. He was appointed a Companion of the Order of the Bath (CB) in the 1945 New Year Honours, and promoted to Knight Commander of the Order of the British Empire (KBE) in the 1946 New Year Honours, and Knight Commander of the Order of the Bath (KCB) in the 1947 New Year Honours.

Military offices
Preceded by Sir Arthur Palliser	Fourth Sea Lord; 1946–1948	Succeeded by Sir Herbert Packer
