= Herbert Packer (Royal Navy officer) =

Royal Navy admiral (1894–1962)

Admiral Sir Herbert Packer KCB CBE
- Born: 9 October 1894; Cressage, Shropshire, England
- Died: 23 September 1962 (aged 67); Cape Town, South Africa
- Spouse: Joy Packer (m. 1924)
- Military career
- Allegiance: United Kingdom
- Branch: Royal Navy
- Service years: 1907–1953
- Rank: Admiral
- Commands: South Atlantic Station (1950–52); 2nd Cruiser Squadron (1946–48); HMS Warspite (1943); HMS Excellent (1941–43); HMS Manchester (1940–41); HMS Calcutta (1939–40)
- Conflicts: First World War; Battle of the Falkland Islands; Battle of Jutland; Second World War; Battle of the Mediterranean; Battle of Cape Spartivento; Italian campaign; Allied invasion of Sicily; Allied invasion of Italy; Operation Dragoon
- Awards: Knight Commander of the Order of the Bath; Commander of the Order of the British Empire; Mentioned in Despatches; Officer of the Legion of Merit (United States); Commander of the Legion of Honour (France); Croix de Guerre (France)

Admiral Sir Herbert Annesley Packer, KCB, CBE (9 October 1894 – 23 September 1962) was a senior officer in the Royal Navy who served as Commander-in-Chief, South Atlantic from 1950 to 1952.

== Family background ==
The only son of William Packer and musician Edith Mary Rutter, he entered the Royal Naval College, Osborne, as an officer cadet on 15 September 1907.

== Early career ==
Packer joined the Royal Navy in 1907. He left Dartmouth Naval College with the King's dirk and gold medal for outstanding qualities of leadership and joined HMS St. Vincent as a midshipman. In 1913 he invented an uncle in Australia and was chosen from a score of volunteers to sail the new battlecruiser HMAS Australia to Sydney. During the First World War, Packer stayed on HMAS Australia and his first action was off the Falkland Isles as part of a boarding party that captured the German S.S. Elaenor Woermann from Hamburg. His ability to speak fluent German (and French) allowed him to interrogate the crew. The captured ship was scuttled.

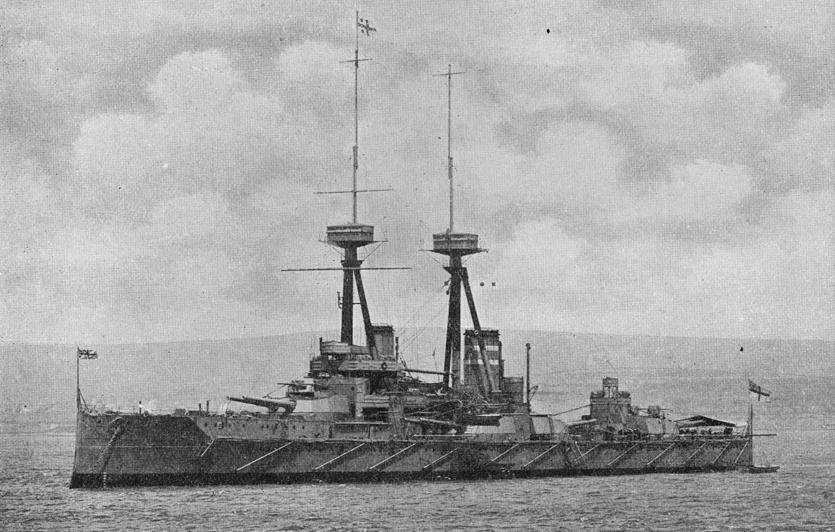
HMS St. Vincent at the Coronation Review off Spithead in 1911

As an acting sub-lieutenant, Bertie Packer joined the new battleship HMS Warspite on 22 February 1915. He was trained as an Assistant gunnery officer. After the Battle of Jutland in 1916, Packer was mentioned in despatches for firing 12 rounds (though all fell short of their target) at the line of German High Seas Fleet battleships under local control. Warspite was heavily damaged and direction and gunnery control was disabled. Packer was also made a lieutenant.

In the years between the wars, Packer served in HMS Dublin, HMS Excellent, married South African author and journalist Joy Petersen in 1924, served in Warspite, Valiant and Queen Elizabeth in the Mediterranean Sea, qualified as a naval interpreter in French, took a course at the Royal Navy Staff College, and then joined the crew of the cruiser HMS Kent as fleet gunnery officer of the China Station in Wei Hai Wei. In 1936 Captain Packer was appointed naval attaché to the embassy in Angora, and to the legations at Belgrade and Athens.

== Second World War ==
On 24 August 1939 Packer was appointed to command the cruiser HMS Calcutta. In February 1940 the Calcutta and the destroyer HMS Cossack chased the German supply-ship Altmark. Captain Philip Vian of the Cossack led a boarding party, in neutral Norwegian waters and freed the 300 captive British sailors on board. As captain of HMS Manchester Captain Packer was involved in the Battle of Cape Spartivento. On 27 November 1940 the 18th Cruiser Squadron attacked and dispersed a superior Italian fleet off the Sardinian coast. Captain Packer, an aggressive commander, suggested in his report that the Admiralty "stow more ammunition for the forward turrets, possibly at the expense of the after turrets" as it was "an experience common to many, if not all, of H.M. ships in action, both in this war and the last, and I am willing to prophesy that it is a situation that is likely to continue, that the foremost turrets fired many more rounds than the after turrets".

Between 1941 and 1943 Captain Packer was commanding officer of HMS Excellent, a shore installation, the Gunnery School on Whale Island, near Portsmouth. In the spring of 1943 Captain Packer was put in command of his first battleship – the veteran Warspite. The battleship was the H.Q. of Rear Admiral Arthur William La Touche Bisset and part of Force H. The 15-inch (381 mm) guns bombarded Catania and supported the Allied landings on Sicily and the Italian mainland. Warspite was shelling Salerno on 15 September 1943 when a new German weapon was deployed. Fritz X wireless guided bombs, controlled by an aircraft at 20,000 ft (6,000 m), crashed through the decks and one of them exploded in the boiler room. Captain Packer managed to bring the crippled ship, under tow, back to Malta and was once again mentioned in despatches. He has the rare honour of having been so honoured for his conduct on the same ship in two world wars.

Rear Admiral Packer spent the rest of the war as a staff officer (Commodore administration) and then Chief of Staff to the Commander-in-Chief Mediterranean Fleet. For planning the amphibious operations in Sicily and landings in Southern France Packer was made a Commander of the Order of the British Empire in January 1945. Later in that year he was made a Companion of the Order of the Bath for his conduct in Italy. The American government made him an Officer in their Legion of Merit, and the French awarded him the Croix de Guerre avec Palme and made him a Commandeur in the Legion d'Honneur.

== Post-war activities ==
Packer hoisted his flag in HMS Superb and commanded the 2nd Cruiser Squadron. In 1948 he became Fourth Sea Lord and Chief of Supplies and Transport. For his services to the United Kingdom he was made a Knight Commander of the Order of the Bath.

Packer's last command was that of Commander-in-Chief, South Atlantic. He was a full admiral now and retired in 1953.

Packer retired in Cape Town and died in September 1962, aged 67. He left a wife and a son, the surgeon Peter Packer who emigrated to Australia. The ashes of Herbert Packer were scattered from the side of the frigate HMSAS Good Hope near Cape Point, where the Indian and Atlantic oceans meet.

== Other activities ==
Packer played a single first-class cricket match in 1920, appearing for a Royal Navy cricket team against Cambridge University; he batted as a tail-ender in the match, scoring 0 and 3, and took two catches as wicketkeeper.

== Literature ==
- Packer, Joy (1976). Deep as the Sea. London: Methuen. ISBN 978-0-413-32690-4.

Military offices
Preceded by Sir Douglas Fisher	Fourth Sea Lord; 1948–1950	Succeeded by Earl Mountbatten
Preceded by Sir Desmond McCarthy	Commander-in-Chief, South Atlantic Station; 1950–1952	Succeeded by Sir Peveril William-Powlett
