= Greg Lazarus =

South African collaborative writing duo

Greg Lazarus is the pen name of South African husband-and-wife writing duo Greg Fried and Lisa Lazarus. Greg Lazarus is the author of the novels Paradise and When in Broad Daylight I Open my Eyes, and the couple have also published the memoir The Book of Jacob about the experience of the first year of raising a child. The couple have also written short stories including This could get messy which won best story at the National Arts Festival.

== Authors ==
Dr. Greg Fried was a philosopher at the University of Cape Town, and holds a PhD from Trinity College, University of Cambridge. He co-wrote the book Business Ethics & other paradoxes, and has written on social choice theory. Greg writes for NGOs, governments and businesses and is the co-founder of a corporate-training platform.

Lisa Lazarus is a psychologist and freelance writer. She has a master's degree in educational psychology and a higher diploma in education. She completed her master's degree in creative writing at the University of Cape Town.

Greg Fried and Lisa Lazarus live in Cape Town, South Africa with their two sons.

== Works ==
- Paradise (Kwela Books, 2014)
- When in Broad Daylight I Open my Eyes (Kwela Books, 2012)
- As Greg Fried and Lisa Lazarus: The Book of Jacob: A Journey into Parenthood (2009)
- Mapping the interior (Burnet Media, 2013)
- This could get messy (National Arts Festival, 2016)

== See also ==
- List of South Africans
- List of South African writers
