= Rachel Zadok =

South African writer

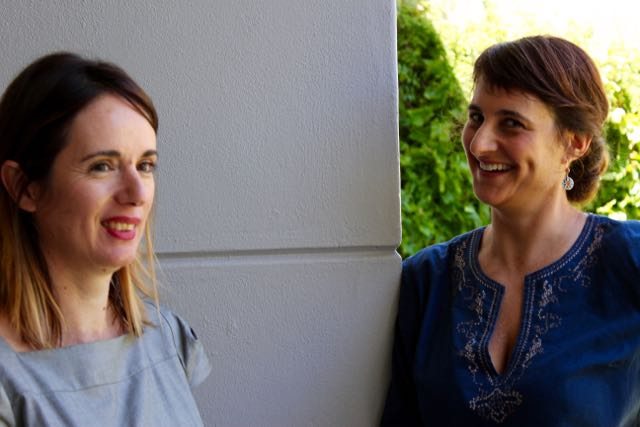
- Rachel Zadok (left) with Diane Awerbuck at the launch of Water in 2016.
- Born: 5 October 1972 (age 53); South Africa
- Occupation: Writer
- Writing career
- Genre: Experimental fiction
- Notable works: Gem Squash Tokoloshe and Sister-Sister
- Website: rachelzadok.com

Rachel Zadok is a South African writer and a Whitbread First Novel Award nominee (2005). She is the author of the novels Gem Squash Tokoloshe and Sister-Sister.

== Life ==
Zadok was born in South Africa in 1972 to a South African mother and an Israeli father and grew up in Kensington, a white middle-class suburb of Johannesburg. She later studied Fine Art and worked as a freelance graphic designer. She moved with her doctor husband to London, England in 2001 where she waitressed for a while and then worked for an orphans' charity. She graduated with a Certificate in Novel Writing from City University, London. It was in London that Zadok began writing Gem Squash Tokoloshe, a first novel set in her native South Africa. "The book is really about belief and the influence society has on children," she said in a November 2005 BBC interview.

In 2004, Zadok entered the 'How to Get Published' competition on Channel 4's Richard & Judy Show, reaching the final five of 46,000 entrants. Pan Macmillan subsequently offered her a publishing contract.

Gem Squash Tokoloshe was shortlisted for the Whitbread Book Awards First Novel award and the John Llewellyn Rhys Prize, and long-listed for the International Dublin Literary Award. The Whitbread Judges announced: "Gem Squash Tokoloshe impressed us with its powerful evocation of a child's-eye view of rural South Africa. Rachel Zadok sets the private drama of a collapsing household against the backdrop of a changing nation and creates a tangible atmosphere of menace".

Zadok returned to South Africa in 2010 and now lives with her husband and daughter in Cape Town. In The Guardian of 18 November 2005 Zadok commented: "I feel like I can't run away from it [South Africa] and live somewhere else. I've got to pay my dues, give back to the country that gave me so much..."

Zadok has spoken of her wish to set up a project for HIV/AIDS orphans in her native South Africa. In 2011, she launched Short Story Day Africa, an initiative to highlight African short fiction.

She published her second novel, Sister-Sister, with South African publisher Kwela Books in 2013.

== Works ==
- Gem Squash Tokoloshe, Pan Macmillan, 2005
- Sister-Sister, Kwela Books, 2013

Short works by Rachel Zadok have also appeared in The Observer, the Jewish Chronicle, The Independent and African Violet, the 2012 Caine Prize Anthology.

== See also ==
- List of South Africans
- List of South African writers
