= Nor the Moon by Night =

1958 film

- Film poster
- Directed by: Ken Annakin
- Written by: Guy Elmes
- Based on: novel by Joy Packer
- Produced by: John Stafford
- Starring: Michael Craig; Belinda Lee; Patrick McGoohan; Anna Gaylor
- Cinematography: Harry Waxman
- Edited by: Alfred Roome
- Music by: James Bernard
- Production company: IFP Limited
- Distributed by: Rank Organisation
- Release date: 1958 (UK)
- Running time: 84 minutes
- Country: United Kingdom
- Language: English

Nor the Moon by Night is a 1958 British drama film directed by Ken Annakin and starring Belinda Lee, Michael Craig and Patrick McGoohan. It was written by Guy Elmes based on the 1957 novel of the same title by Joy Packer and partly filmed in the Kruger National Park, South Africa. The title is a quote from the Old Testament passage (Psalm 121:6), "The sun shall not smite thee by day, nor the moon by night." The film was released in the United States as Elephant Gun. It has several sections in Swahili but is not subtitled.

== Plot summary ==
Two brothers, Rusty and Andrew Miller, are game wardens in Africa. Andrew's fiancée Alice Lang visits from the UK, and falls in love with Rusty.

A broken headlight caused by a crashed Land Rover starts a bush fire, and the humans try to beat it out as the wildlife stampedes to escape. Meanwhile, Andrew has tied himself into a tree to escape the lions but threatens to be burnt in the fire.

== Cast ==
- Belinda Lee as Alice Lang
- Michael Craig as Rusty Miller
- Patrick McGoohan as Andrew Miller
- Anna Gaylor as Thea Boryslawski
- Eric Pohlmann as Boryslawski
- Pamela Stirling as Mrs. Boryslawski
- Lionel Ngakane as Nimrod
- Joan Brickhill as Harriet Carver
- Ben Heydenrych as Sergeant Van Wyck
- Alfred Kumalo as Chief
- Doreen Hlantie as Oasis

US release poster

== Production ==
=== Development ===
Joy Packer's novel Nor the Moon by Night was published in 1957. Film rights were bought by John Davis of the Rank Film Organisation, in part because Davis's wife Dinah Sheridan was a fan of the novel. Packer later wrote she sold the rights via a "contract which reduced me to nothing and made me feel like the man who sold his shadow to the devil".

In the late 1950s, the Rank Organisation made a series of adventure films in colour shot on location which were aimed at the international audience. These included The Black Tent, Robbery Under Arms, Ferry to Hong Kong, Campbell's Kingdom and Nor the Moon by Night.

The film was directed by Ken Annakin who was making it under a two picture contract he had with Rank. He says that he did not really want to do the job. The film he really wanted to make was The Singer Not the Song but when he could not get the casting he wanted for that film he decided to make the second film under his deal, Nor the Moon by Night. He agreed because it gave him the chance to see South Africa. He later wrote "At this period, both Guy and I believed we could turn almost any material into a viable screenplay, and the opportunity to travel again and make a movie with the easygoing John Stafford finally swept away any scruples I had. 'It’s really only just to give us time to hook Brando and make the big movie next', he assured me."

Packer says producer Stafford flew out to South Africa to meet with her and secure her help in making the movie. He showed her the script which she found "amazingly fresh and new. The basic situation and a few names and places were vaguely familiar. I recognised none of the dialogue and only part of the action, but the story sounded exciting."

=== Casting ===
"This should have a strong appeal to the youngsters,” Annakin said in September 1957. “And for that reason I want a predominantly young cast, preferably under 30." Michael Craig was the first actor announced.

Packer felt Belinda Lee was physically miscast to play the role, but Annakin pointed out she was under contract and felt "she'll play Alice very convincingly. She's very intense - is Belinda". FilmInk said "Lee’s part was in the 'sensible girl' realm, a spinster who discovers love on the veldt in between being attacked by wildlife." Annakin later wrote "our great coup was supposed to be Belinda Lee, a very beautiful model, who had been picked up by Rank and was now regarded, at least by John Davis, as their ‘Big Attraction’. Nobody thought of her as a great actress, but she did look great, and I felt with careful direction, she could be adequate."

Packer later wrote "none of the cast bore the faintest resemblance to my characters."

=== Shooting ===
Filming began on 23 November 1957 on location in South Africa. The unit was based at Cato Ridge. The bulk of location shooting took place in the Valley of a Thousand Hills near Durban, with second unit work involving animals near Johannesburg. At one stage the film was known as The Voice of the Lion.

Production was plagued by a number of difficulties. Lee left the unit during the shoot to see her married lover Prince Filippo Orsini in Italy who had been threatening to kill himself; they both attempted suicide. Patrick McGoohan suffered concussion after crashing his car. Anna Gaylor fell ill with dysentery.

Director Annakin had a number of issues with the crew; he later wrote that the electricians sabotaged director of photography Peter Hennessey's rushes with incorrect light filters, forcing him to be replaced by Harry Waxman. The cast and crew consistently fell sick, with snake and spider bites, heat exhaustion, dysentery, rheumatism and chest complaints the chief cause. He wrote "despite the efforts Guy Elmes and I had made, the screenplay had not escaped its ‘women’s magazine' origins. The situations were trite, and the relationships cliché, so that neither I nor the actors were making the dialogue real and convincing." Craig wrote in his memoirs that Annakin was known among the crew "not very lovingly" as "Panickin' Annakin".

Lee returned from Italy on 2 February 1958 to recommence filming. She flew into Johannesburg Airport, then took a flight to Durban. Questions were asked in South African parliament whether Lee was given special treatment to get into the country as a customs and immigration officer went to meet her on the plane at Johannesburg Airport so she could avoid the press. "I regret any harm I have done to anyone in Italy," she said.

One of the cheetahs used in filming savaged its trainer. A bush fire got out of control. Craig, although married, had an affair on set with a woman called Shirley. He also almost drowned crossing a river. At one point, Craig was the only one of the four leads available at work. He later quipped "I'm left alone for three weeks with a film crew and a lot of monkeys." Annakin said "one day there was only me and a snake available to work." However Annakin did meet his future wife Pauline Carter during filming.

The unit returned to London in April 1958 where some additional scenes were shot, including a new ending. "I feel as if I have just come out of prison", said Lee on her return. "I have been watched and questioned all the time. I'm 22 and hope to marry again before I'm 80. Love is the important thing. I believe in letting my heart rule my head." Filming took around a month.

The movie was completed over budget and behind schedule. Rank terminated Lee's contract, and she never worked for the studio again. The job of directing The Singer Not the Song was taken from Annakin and given to Roy Ward Baker.

Rank said the combined cost of the film and three others – Innocent Sinners, The Wind Cannot Read and A Night to Remember – was £1,100,000.

Annakin later said "the picture was a mediocre hotch potch." He elaborated "as I had always suspected, it could never make a great statement about Africa, but after shooting a new ending, the result was passable entertainment. But we had gone so far over budget that my honeymoon with John Davis was over. All the promises of my making The Singer Not the Song were broken." He added "Over the long haul, the movie recouped its budget in Europe, and made some profit in the U.S.... but there were no bonuses or deferments for us — except that I had Pauline, and no bonus could have been greater."

== Reception ==
=== Box office ===
The film managed to recoup its costs in Europe and made a profit after its release in the United States.

=== Critical ===
The Monthly Film Bulletin wrote: "Into this story of love and adventure in the African jungle the Rank Organisation has put a great deal of money and time spent on location work, a highly professional director (Ken Annakin), and two of its most talented young actors, Michael Craig and Patrick McGoohan, both of whom are capable of performances of real quality. It is sad that such resources should have been squandered on material of pulp magazine level, in which neither character nor incident nor theme has any coherence or interest, Given such an assignment, no one concerned can fairly be criticised for the characterless result."

Variety wrote: "The scenery and animal shots of Nor the Moon By Night are great. It's too bad that the cast has to get in front of it all. And the actors have a rough time of it. Apart from competing with the superb colored life of Africa, they are up against an incredibly silly story and stodgy dialog. ... In no way does the finished pic stand up to the undoubted effort that must have gone into production. ... This farrago of nonsense is relieved only by some first class photography of animal life by Harry Waxman and the second unit lenser, Alex Bryce plus some stirringly-directed action scenes. ... Ken Annakin has done a good tongue-in-the-cheek job of direction. But though he has coped admirably with the physical problems of Darkest Africa, he has been defeated by Guy Elmes' screenplay."

FilmInk called it "a mess, with traditional Rank strengths (South African location filming, colour, attractive actors) and weaknesses (story, over reliance on contract players). The film had a troubled production with various cast and crew getting injured, the crew rebelling, and star Belinda Lee attempting suicide because her married lover wouldn’t leave his wife. All of that was more exciting than what’s on screen, although it did result in one of Lee’s best British performances, and the pictures are pretty."

== Bibliography ==
- Annakin, Ken (2001). So you wanna be a director?. Tomahawk Press.
- Packer, Joy (1963). Home from Sea. Eyre & Spotswoode.
