= Walter Yeo =

Royal Navy sailor and plastic surgery recipient

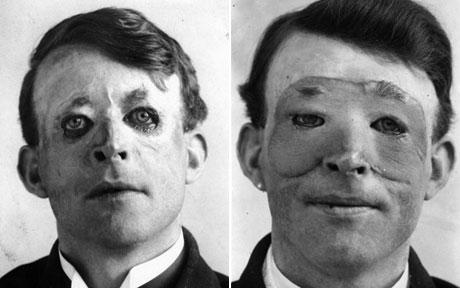
A photograph of Walter Yeo in 1917, showing his face before (right) and after the tube pedicle flap reconstruction of his face (left) fully healed.

Walter Ernest O'Neil Yeo (20th October 1890 – December 1960) was an English sailor in the First World War, who is thought to have been one of the first people to benefit from advanced plastic surgery, namely a skin flap.

== Early life ==
Yeo was born in Plymouth, Devon, to Petty Officer Francis Yeo and his wife Rhoda Sarah Yeo (née Jarman). He had two elder sisters, Adelaide and Elsie. Three weeks after his birth, his father was killed aboard HMS Serpent while on route to Sierra Leone, after hitting rocks off Cape Vilan, Spain. Three of the 176 people on board survived the shipwreck. His mother was later an alemaker at the Royal William Victualling Yard.

=== Navy ===
Yeo entered into the Royal Navy aged 15. As he was under 18, he was rated as a boy, second class. His sub-rating was that of bugler until 1911. His date of formally joining was 1 October 1906. He signed up for 12 years' service, and this period would only start when he turned 18. Thus the date of his adult service, and hence the start of his 12 years' service, started on his 18th birthday in 1908. He had his initial training aboard HMS Ganges (shore establishment), and first went to sea aboard HMS Dido (1896) in 1907, by this time a boy, first class. He was rated ordinary seaman on his 18th birthday and conducted his adult training at HMS Vivid (shore establishment 1890).

He was assigned to HMS Bellerophon (1907) in 1911, and was promoted to leading seaman in 1912. After further training back at HMS Vivid I, he joined HMS Warspite (03) on 1 April 1915, becoming a petty officer whilst aboard on 20 May 1915. He would be promoted to acting warrant officer in June 1917 as a gunner.

=== Injuries ===
Yeo was wounded on 31 May 1916, during the Battle of Jutland, while manning the guns aboard the battleship HMS Warspite. He sustained terrible facial injuries, including the loss of upper and lower eyelids. There is some uncertainty as to where he was first admitted to hospital, due to the poor documentation. However, he is known to have been admitted to Plymouth Hospital while waiting for a place at Queen Mary's Hospital in Sidcup, Kent, which was granted on 8 August 1917. He was treated by Harold Gillies, the first man to transfer skin from undamaged areas on the body. Gillies's notes on this case indicate that the main disfigurement was severe ectropion as well as waxy scar tissue of the forehead and nose. Gillies opened a specialist ward at Queen Mary's Hospital for the treatment of the facially wounded. Yeo is thought to have been one of the first patients to be treated with this newly developed technique, a form of skin transplantation called a 'tubed pedicle' flap.

=== Aftermath ===
During the long process of surgery, a 'mask' of skin was transplanted across Yeo's face and eyes, including new eyelids. The operation to replace the skin of the midface and forehead took place in multiple stages. The first stage was the outlining of the graft as well as placement of a stent to contour for the nasal dorsum on 12 November 1917. On post-operative day five, a serious infection was noted as well as complications with the stent requiring surgical intervention. On 30 November, the second stage of the surgery was performed which consisted of excision of the scar tissue of the face and transfer of the graft. Again, post-operative infection was a major complication. Gillies described the flap as "floating in pus at one point" which required extensive care to salvage most of the tissue. In January 1918, the pedicles were returned to the chest with the surgery deemed a success. Minor revisions were performed in the following months to improve the aesthetics of the graft. By July 1919, he was found to be fit for active service again and was recorded as having completed courses in September 1919. He underwent a further operation in August 1921, after which his disfigurement was recorded as 'improved, but still severe', and he was recommended for medical discharge, which took place on 15 December 1921. Yeo later received further treatment for a corneal ulcer at the Royal Naval Hospital in Plymouth in 1938.

== Personal and later life ==
Yeo married Ada Edwards in 1914, and had two daughters with her: Lilian Evelyn Yeo, born 21 October 1914, and Doreen Y. Yeo, born in 1919. He died in his hometown, Plymouth, where he had spent the majority of his life, in 1960 at the age of seventy.
