= Joy Packer =

South African writer (1905–1977)

Joy Petersen Packer (12 February 1905 – 7 September 1977) was a South African author of autobiography and romantic adventure novels.

== Biography ==
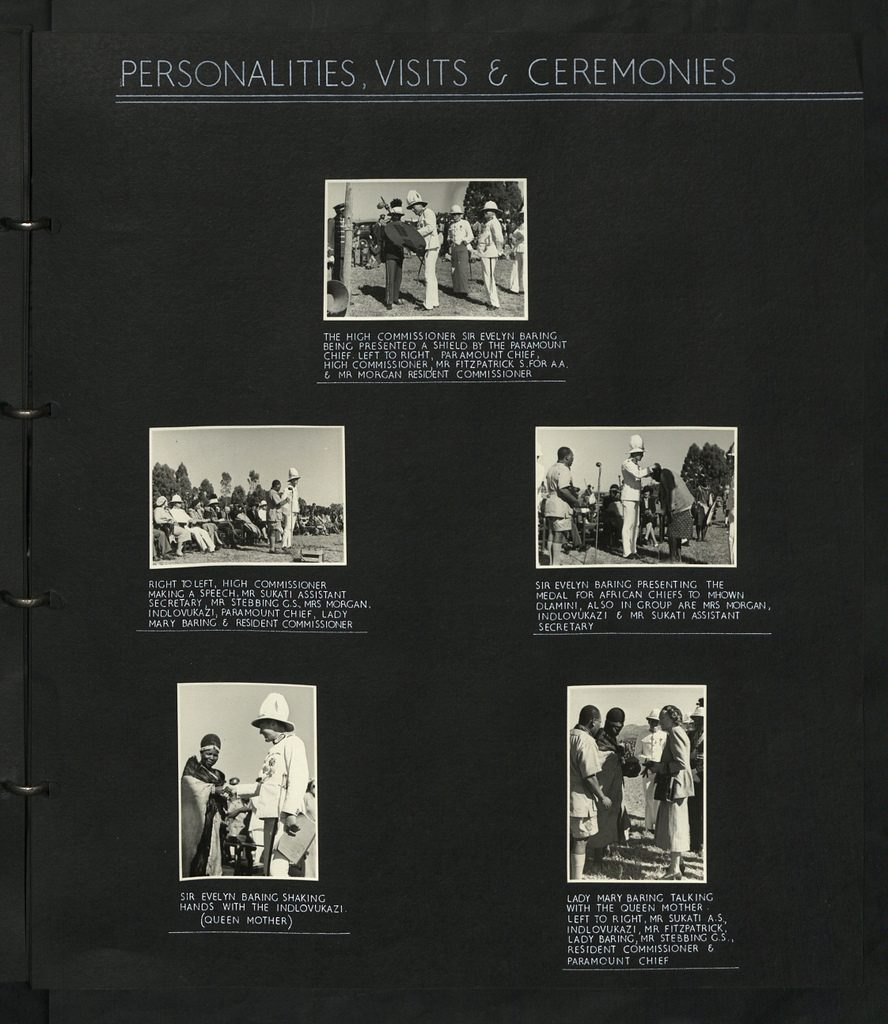
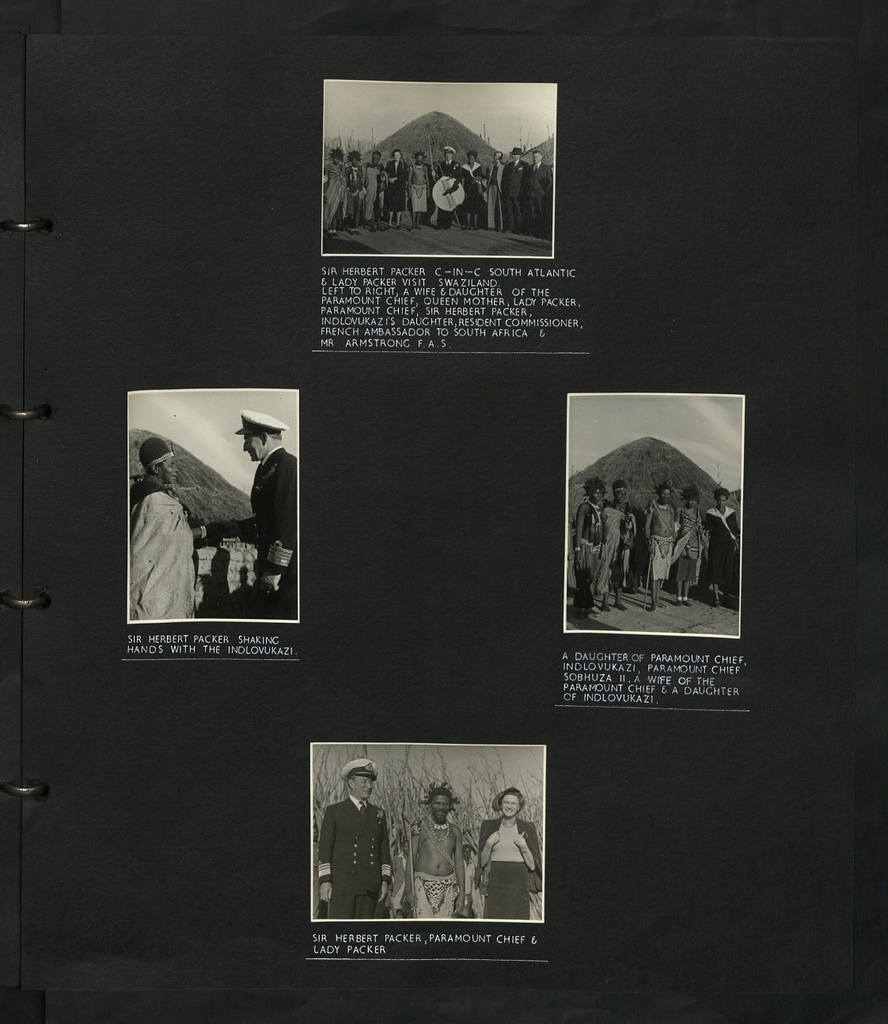
The National Archives pictures of Sir Herbert Packer and "Lady Packer" meeting the Swazi royal family of king Sobhuza II.

Packer was born and educated in Cape Town, graduating as a journalist from the University of Cape Town. She worked initially as a freelance journalist, in 1931 becoming a reporter for London's Daily Express. After this, she spent time on radio in Hong Kong as well as a stint writing for British publications in the Balkans. During World War II she was a broadcaster to South Africa for the BBC, then worked in the Ministry of Information in Egypt, and at Allied Headquarters in Italy. Her travelling was tied up with her marriage to a British admiral, Sir Herbert Packer. When her husband was knighted in the 1950 Birthday Honours list, she automatically became known as "Lady Packer", a courtesy title.

== Works ==
Her first works of note were three volumes of memoirs published from 1945 to 1953, dealing with her travels throughout the world during the period before, during, and just after World War II with her husband. Places visited included Britain, the Mediterranean, the Balkans, and China. In the early 1950s, she went on a substantial tour of Africa, which is included in her later published final three volumes of memoirs.

In the 1950s, she also began publishing novels, starting with Valley of the Vines in 1955, which sold more than 600,000 copies in English, and was translated into at least nine European languages. Although her novels' principal themes were romantic, several sources state them as also important for their sociopolitical commentary on South Africa at the time. Her second novel, Nor the Moon by Night, was made into a British film of the same name. In America, it was released as Elephant Gun.

=== Novels ===
- Valley of the Vines (1955)
- The High Roof (1959)
- Nor the Moon by Night (1957)
- The Glass Barrier (1961)
- The Man in the Mews (1964)
- The Blind Spot (1967)
- Leopard in the Fold (1969)
- Veronica (1970)
- Boomerang (1972)
- Dark Curtain (1977)

=== Memoirs ===
- Pack and Follow (1945)
- Grey Mistress (1949) on HMS Warspite
- Apes and Ivory (1953)
- Home from the Sea (1963)
- The World is a Proud Place (1966)
- Deep as the Sea (1975) A biography of Admiral Sir Bertie Packer
