= Lisa de Nikolits =

Canadian writer and art director

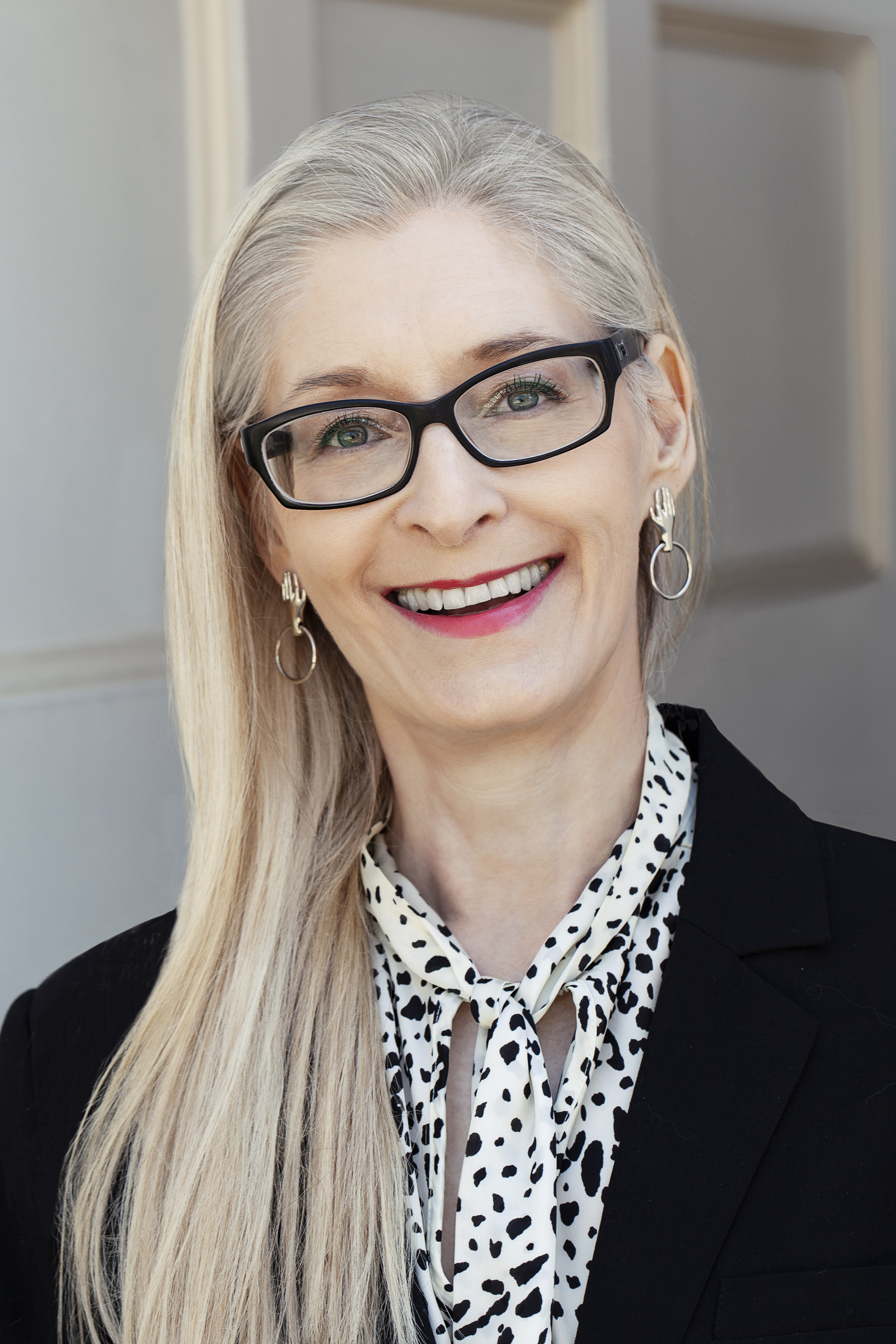
- Lisa de Nikolits in 2020
- Born: Lisa de Nikolits; Johannesburg, South Africa
- Education: University of the Witwatersrand, Johannesburg
- Occupations: Novelist; Art director
- Writing career
- Notable awards: IPPY Awards
- Website: www.lisawriter.com

Lisa de Nikolits is a Canadian writer and art director originally from South Africa, who moved to Canada in 2000. She is known for her novels, short stories, and poetry. Her writing has received attention from Canadian Living magazine and Canadian Literature.

De Nikolits has received an Independent Publisher Book Award. Her novel The Occult Persuasion and the Anarchist's Solution was longlisted for the 2020 Sunburst Award for Excellence in Canadian Literature of the Fantastic. Her book The Rage Room was a finalist in the science fiction category of the International Book Awards (IBA) in 2021.

She is a member of Crime Writers of Canada, the International Thriller Writers, and Sisters in Crime.

== Early life and education ==
De Nikolits was born in South Africa. She grew up in Gauteng. She has a Bachelor of Arts in English literature and philosophy from the University of the Witwatersrand, Johannesburg. In 2000, de Nikolits moved to Canada where she became a Canadian citizen in 2003. She has worked as an art director in the United States, Australia and Britain for Marie Claire, Vogue Australia, and Vogue Living. She has worked on Hello! Canada, Canadian Health & Lifestyle, Canadian Living, Cosmetics and other Canadian magazine titles.

== Writing ==
De Nikolits is the author of thirteen novels and the recipient of several awards and honours. The stories of de Nikolits and three other members of the writer's group Mesdames of Mayhem were presented in CBC Documentary in October 2019, The Mesdames of Mayhem, a CBC GEM documentary. Her books were chosen as a Chatelaine Editor's Pick.

The Occult Persuasion and The Anarchist’s Solution was longlisted for a Sunburst Award for Excellence in Canadian Literature of The Fantastic and The Rage Room was a finalist in the International Book Awards 2021.

Her most recent novel is That Time I Killed You.

Her short fiction and poetry the Crime Writers of Canada’s 40th Anniversary anthology (2022).

== Awards and honors ==
- Judge for the Hamilton Literary Awards 2014, Fiction.
- The Occult Persuasion and the Anarchist's Solution, longlisted for a Sunburst Award for Excellence in Canadian Literature of the Fantastic, 2020
- The Rage Room, finalist International Book Awards (IBA), Science Fiction, 2021

== Selected publications ==
=== Books ===
- De Nikolits, Lisa, 1966- (2010). The hungry mirror : a novel. Toronto: Inanna Publications and Education Inc. ISBN 978-1-926708-00-3. OCLC 441760914.
- De Nikolits, Lisa, 1966- (2011). West of Wawa - a novel. Toronto: Inanna Publications and Education. ISBN 978-1-926708-24-9. OCLC 748088977.
- De Nikolits, Lisa (2013). A glittering chaos : a novel. Toronto. ISBN 978-1-77133-041-1. OCLC 861786925.
- De Nikolits, Lisa, 1966- (2014). The witchdoctor's bones : a novel. Toronto, Canada. ISBN 978-1-77133-126-5. OCLC 871318780.
- De Nikolits, Lisa, 1966- (August 20, 2015). Between the cracks she fell. Toronto, Canada. ISBN 978-1-77133-225-5. OCLC 910530601.
- De Nikolits, Lisa, 1966- (2016). The nearly girl. Toronto, Ontario. ISBN 978-1-77133-313-9. OCLC 953887615.
- De Nikolits, Lisa. No fury like that : a novel. Toronto. ISBN 978-1-77133-416-7. OCLC 1011500992.
- De Nikolits, Lisa (2018). Rotten peaches : a novel. Toronto, Ontario, Canada. ISBN 978-1-77133-530-0. OCLC 1078550109.
- De Nikolits, Lisa (2019). Una furia dell'altro mondo. Edizioni Le Assassine. ISBN 9788894979183.
- De Nikolits, Lisa (September 20, 2019). The occult persuasion and the anarchist's solution : a novel. Toronto, Canada. ISBN 978-1-77133-649-9. OCLC 1096469921.
- De Nikolits, Lisa (2020). The rage room : a novel. Toronto, Canada. ISBN 978-1-77133-777-9. OCLC 1153476672.
- De Nikolits, Lisa (2020). Everything You Dream is Real. Toronto, Canada. ISBN 978-1-77133-930-8. OCLC 1337926815.
- De Nikolits, Lisa (2025). Mad Dog and the Sea Dragon. Toronto, Canada: Inanna Publications and Education Inc. ISBN 183421002X.
- De Nikolits, Lisa, 1966- (2026). The time I killed you. Toronto: Level Best Books. ISBN 979-8898202439. OCLC 441760914.

== Articles ==
- "Women Writing4: Remembering". Inanna Publications.
- "Canadian Woman Studies Volume 38: Visionary Feminisms I". Inanna Publications.
- "She Comforts Me in Canadian Woman Studies Journal". 2015.

== Personal life ==
De Nikolits has lived in Canada since 2000. She has lived in the USA, Australia and Britain.
