= Melinda Ferguson =

South African journalist, publisher and writer

- Born: Johannesburg, South Africa
- Citizenship: South Africa
- Occupations: Writer, publisher

Melinda Ferguson is a South African writer and publisher known for her works in the fields of memoir, non-fiction, and traditional and motoring journalism. Raised in Johannesburg, South Africa, Ferguson's writing explores themes of addiction, recovery, and personal transformation.

== Early life and education ==
Ferguson was born in Ermelo, South Africa. She grew up in Johannesburg. Her early life was marked by struggles with addiction, which would later become a central theme in her writing.

== Career ==
Ferguson became an actress and theatre director. At the age of 24, she became addicted to heroin and crack cocaine which would see her once promising life spectacularly unravel. She got clean in late 1999. Ferguson used these experiences to pen her debut memoir Smacked which would go on to become a bestselling addiction cult classic. She subsequently penned Hooked (2005), Crashed (2015) and Bamboozled (2022).

Her book When Love Kills - the Tragic Tale of AKA and Anele was released in April 2024. It tracked the relationship between slain rapper AKA and his girlfriend Anele Tembe, who allegedly fell to her death from the Pepperclub in Cape Town in April 2021, after a night of heated arguing between the couple. In 2012, Ferguson launched her publishing imprint MFBooksJoburg, a joint venture with Jacana Media. She penned and published The Kelly Khumalo Story in 2012 on the life of musician and singer Kelly Khumalo.

In 2014, she cowrote and published Oscar: An Accident Waiting to Happen on athlete Oscar Pistorious’s relationship with Samantha Taylor before his girlfriend Reeva Steenkamp was shot and killed on Valentines Day in 2013.

In 2015, Ferguson published Rape: A South African Nightmare by Pumla Dineo Gqola which went on to win the Alan Paton Award in 2016. Ferguson and Gqola have also collaborated on Reflecting Rogue, A Renegade called Simphiwe and Female Fear Factory.
