= David Yudelman =

David Yudelman is a South African author and financial writer who resides in Toronto, Ontario, Canada.

== A theory for the emergence of modern South Africa ==
His major work, The Emergence of Modern South Africa: State, Capital, and the Incorporation of Organized Labour on the South African Gold Fields, 1902-1939, published in 1983, examined the labour movement in South Africa and takes into account aspects of Marxism and nationalism and applies it to the country. He examined the history of labour in the South African Gold Fields in the first half of the 20th century, combining philosophy and economic theory to understand this process. One important argument was the uncovering of the English roots of Apartheid in South Africa, moving its origins back from the National Party's victory in 1948.

In it he christened Frederick Johnstone, Harold Wolpe and Martin Legassick as ‘elder statesmen’ of ‘the new school' and criticized their work. It remains the standard in its field as a point of departure for theories about the emergence of Modern South Africa. Hermann Giliomee referred to this work in his book The Afrikaners.

"David Yudelman concluded in his study of the relationship between state, capital, and white labor in the 1920s, continuity in government policies before and after J. C. Smuts’ South African Party (SAP) government was defeated by a coalition led by General J. B. M. Hertzog’s National Party in 1924 generally overshadowed the important differences between the two governments.[10] However, in applying a similar argument to 1948, it is not suggested here that the policy differences before and after 1948 were inconsequential."

== Canada ==
On arrival in Canada he dedicated himself to work on economics. He began in banking and also wrote speeches for Matt Barrett and Bill Mulholland, bank chairmen, and for various Ontario ministers. Subsequently, he was a consultant on the Toronto Stock Exchange. He published a work entitled The Scorpion and the Frog: A Consumer View of Canadian Financial Services and Ways to Transform Them in 2001. Yudelman was critical of the financial services industry's ability to regulate itself in the 150-page report which was funded by the federal government. He felt that at stake were the retirement savings of millions of Canadians, who had made a massive shift of assets from safe traditional savings vehicles to more volatile investments tied to the stock market.

On Thursday 19 August 2004 Yudelman testified before the Standing Committee on Finance and Economic Affairs in Canada. His presentation focused on the overall relationship between consumers and financial services.

His son Jonathan Yudelman is also an author who has been published in Azure and resides in Israel.
