= Diphete Bopape =

South African novelist, playwright and journalist

Heniel Diphete D. Bopape (born 1957) is a South African novelist, playwright and journalist.

== Biography ==
Bopape was born in Transvaal Province, in what today is Limpopo. He graduated with a B.A. in psychology from Unisa in 1987. At the time he was lecturing full-time at Dr. C.N. Phatudi College. He is the owner and editor of Seipone, a vernacular newspaper in Limpopo.

Lenong la Gauta (1982) pioneered the detective novel genre in Sepedi.

== Works ==
Plays

- Makgale, Pretoria: Van Schaik, 1978 ISBN 9780627009815

Novels

- Lenong la Gauta [A Golden Vulture], Pretoria: Van Schaik, 1982
- Dikeledi [Tears], Pretoria: Van Schaik, 1985
- Rena Magomotša, Pretoria: De Jager-HAUM, 1987

Short story collections

- Bogobe bja Tswiitswii [Porridge of Tswiitswii], Pretoria: De Jager-HAUM, 1985 ISBN 9780798615303
