= Diane Awerbuck =

South African novelist

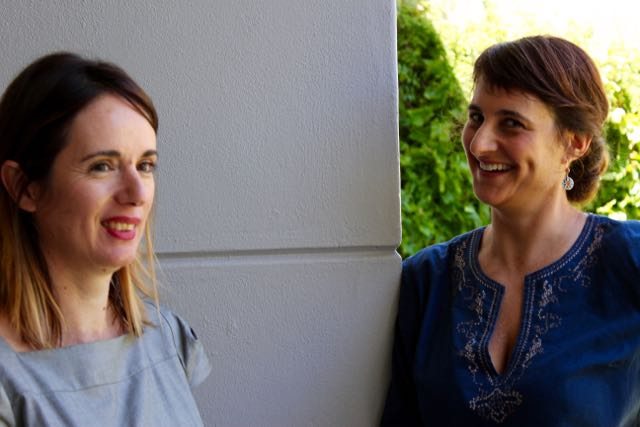
- Rachel Zadok (left) and Diane Awerbuck at the launch of Short Story Day Anthology for 2016 - Water.
- Born: 1 April 1974 (age 52); Kimberley, South Africa
- Occupation: Novelist
- Writing career
- Pen name: Frank Owen
- Language: English
- Genre: Fiction
- Notable works: Gardening at Night (Won the 2004 Commonwealth Writers' Prize, best first book (Africa and the Caribbean), and was shortlisted for the International Dublin Literary Award)

Diane Awerbuck (born 1 April 1974) is a South African novelist. Her most notable novel, Gardening at Night, won the 2004 Commonwealth Writers' Prize, Best First Book (Africa and the Caribbean), and was shortlisted for the International Dublin Literary Award. In 2011, her collection of short stories, Cabin Fever, was published by Random House Struik. Her novel, Home Remedies, was published by Random House Struik in August 2012. She was shortlisted for the Caine Prize in 2014, and won the Short Story Day Africa competition the same year.

She taught at Rustenburg Girls' High School until 2002. Before this, she worked as a teacher of History at Cedar House; and of Narrative and Aesthetics at AFDA, the film school, both in Cape Town. Her non-fiction has appeared in the Mail & Guardian. She reviews fiction for the South African Sunday Times.

Her essays and short stories are published regularly and her work has been translated into German, Swedish, Mandarin and Russian. Her doctorate is in trauma narratives: The Spirit and the Letter: Trauma, Warblogs and the Public Sphere.

Awerbuck also writes as "Frank Owen", a joint pseudonym used when collaborating with co-writer Alex Latimer. Their cowboy-apocalypse novel project South was published in 2016, with a second volume North following in 2018.

== Works ==
=== Novels ===
- Gardening at night, Secker & Warburg, 2003, ISBN 978-0-436-20610-8
- Home Remedies, Umuzi / Random House Struik, 2012, ISBN 978-1-4152-0144-2

=== Short stories ===
- Cabin Fever, Umuzi / Random House Struik, 2011, ISBN 978-1-4152-0111-4

=== As editor ===
- Commissioning Editor of Anthology, The Ghost-Eater and Other Stories, Umuzi Cape Town, 2013, E-Pub 978-1-4152-0568-6

=== Interviews ===
- Aerodrome Interview with Jennifer Malec, Jennifer Malec, (2013).

=== Other ===
Poem in Anthology, African Sun
Terra Incognita: African Speculative Fiction
Twenty in 20: The Best Short Stories of South Africa's 20 Years of Democracy
Ons Klyntji: OK20 The Odyssey
The Gonjon Pin and Other Stories
Sweet Water
Mami Wata
The Sea
Three Poems in Anthology
Atlantis and Colposcopy
The Ghost-Eater and Other Stories
Ons Klyntji: Bewilderbeast
Interview with Jennifer Malec
Duiweltjie – The Root Cellar and Other Stories
Short Story for Short Story Day Africa 2013
Big Issue : Collector's Edition 2
Stick Man
Short story in Anthology
Short story in Anthology
Radio Broadcast on 'Tales to Terrify', USA
Short Story
Home Remedies
Über(w)unden: Art in Troubled Times
Short Story Day Africa Short Story excerpt
Cabin Fever
Heavenly shades of nights are falling, Short story in literary magazine, 'Ons Klyntji'
School photos
Short story in Anthology, Elf
2009 Conference: African mythology: Mami Wata The Book Lounge, Cape Town
2008 Kommst du mit?
Entanglement
The way you look tonight
Muddy Waters, Whisky Blues
Greenland
Der Junge, der Turen offnete
En stereo i Soweto
The boy who opened doors
Gardening at Night
The Dirty Knees of the Mother of GodShort Story, Commonwealth Writers
Everybody Hurts
Gardening at Night
The Portable Pilgrim Online Column, 2003 – 2008 – www.extrange.com

== Magazine contributions ==
- Leadership
- Glamour
- House and Garden
- Design Indaba
- Real simple
- O Magazine
- Ons Klyntji
