= Tenda Madima =

South African writer

- Occupation: Writer

Tenda Madima is a South African writer.

== Biography ==
Madima was born in Venda, Limpopo, and holds a Master's Degree in Public Administration from the University of the Western Cape. He translated the first Venda language novel, A si Ene, written by his father E. S. Madima, into English, and is the author of several novels, poems, short stories and radio scripts, as well as being the founder of the New African Writer's Association. He has been chairperson of the Batsumi Film Script Committee as well as the African Language Practitioner's Forum in the South African Parliament.

His collection of short stories, Ri khou dzedza, won the African Heritage Literature Award in 1997, and A Victim of Circumstances won the South African Translator's Institute Literary Award in 2000.

== Poetry ==
- Mutingati I (1992)

== Novels ==
- A Victim of Circumstances (translated from the original Venda novel by E.S. Madima, 1998)
- The Thrill of a Lifetime (2001)

== Short stories ==
- Ri khou dzedza
