= E. S. Madima =

South African writer

E.S. Madima was a South African writer in the Venda language.

In 1954, Madima wrote the first novel in Venda, A Si Ene. It was later translated into English by his son, Tenda Madima. E.S. Madima was awarded the SALA Literary Lifetime Achievement Award in 2005. He also made a name for himself as a short story writer and columnist. One of his novels Maambwa Ndi One (Rumours are true), have won him several accolades. As a columnist, Madima wrote a regular column in Mungane wa Vhana a journal in which he dealt with pupils questions and concerns.

== Novels ==
- A Si Ene (Not this one) (1954)
- Maduvha Ha Fani (Days Are Not the Same/Similar)
- Hu Na Savhadina (Beware of Savhadina)
- Mmanga Mawelewele, Maambiwa Ndi One (Rumours are True)
