= HMS Warspite (03) =

Queen Elizabeth–class battleship

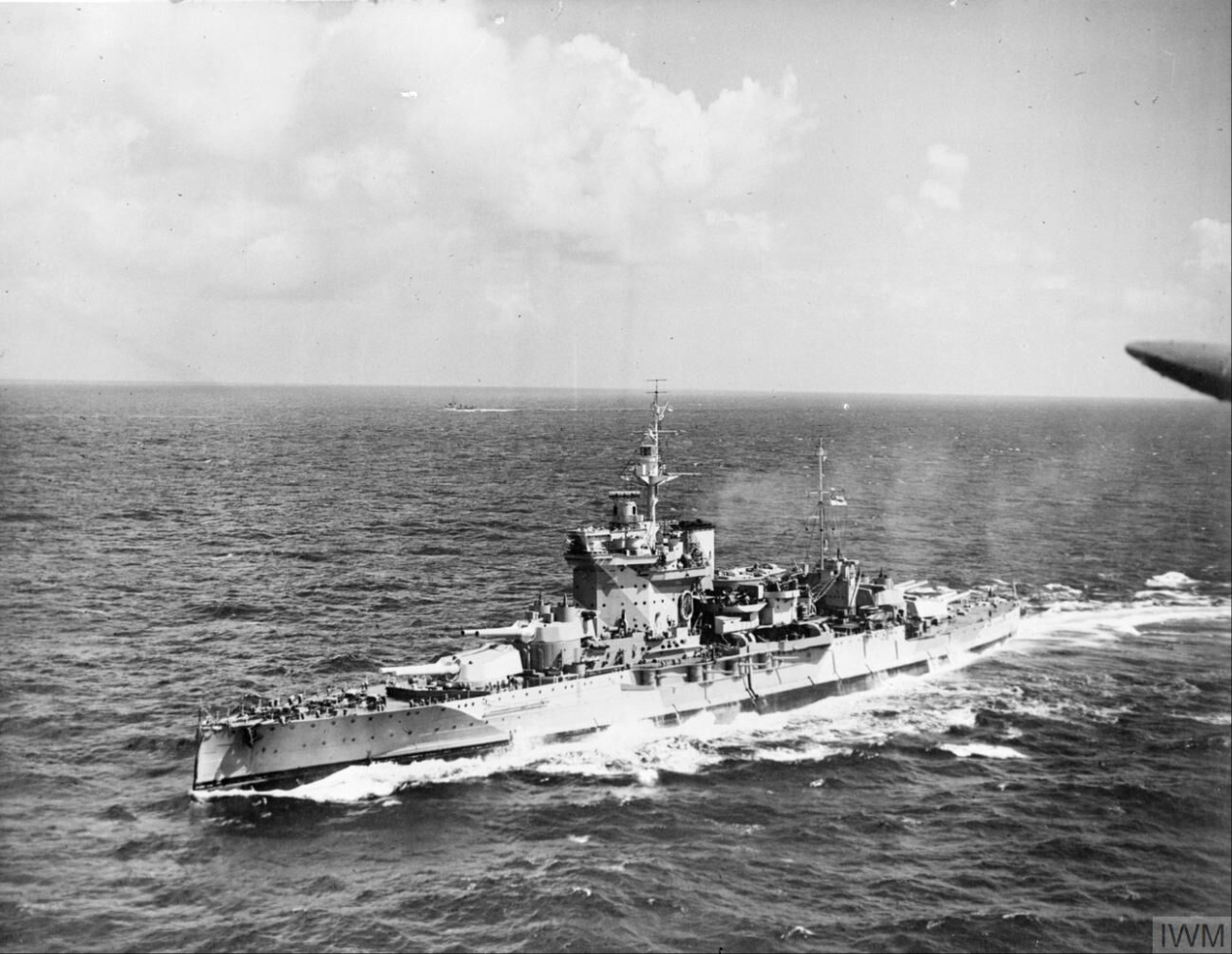
- Warspite under way in the Indian Ocean, 16 July 1942

History

United Kingdom
- Name: Warspite
- Ordered: 1912
- Builder: HM Dockyard, Devonport
- Cost: £2,524,148
- Laid down: 31 October 1912
- Launched: 26 November 1913
- Commissioned: 8 March 1915
- Decommissioned: 1 February 1945
- Stricken: 19 April 1947
- Identification: Pennant number: 57 (1914); A9 (January 18); 12 (April 18); 03 (November 19)
- Motto: Belli dura despicio ("I despise the hardships of war")
- Nickname(s): Grand Old Lady
- Honours and awards: 15 Battle honours (See below)
- Fate: Sold for scrap, 1947

General characteristics (as built)
- Class & type: Queen Elizabeth-class battleship
- Displacement: 32,590 long tons (33,110 t); 33,260 long tons (33,790 t) (Deep load)
- Length: 643 ft 9 in (196.2 m)
- Beam: 90 ft 7 in (27.6 m)
- Draught: 33 ft (10.1 m)
- Installed power: 24 Yarrow boilers; 75,000 shp (56,000 kW)
- Propulsion: 4 shafts; 2 steam turbine sets
- Speed: 24 knots (44 km/h; 28 mph)
- Range: 5,000 nmi (9,300 km; 5,800 mi) at 12 knots (22 km/h; 14 mph)
- Complement: 1,025 (1915); 1,262 (1920, as a flagship)
- Armament: 4 × twin 15 in (381 mm) guns; 14 × single 6 in (152 mm) guns; 2 × single 3 in (76 mm) AA guns; 4 × 21 in (533 mm) torpedo tubes
- Armour: Waterline belt: 13 in (330 mm); Deck: 1–3 in (25–76 mm); Barbettes: 7–10 in (178–254 mm); Gun turrets: 11–13 in (279–330 mm); Conning tower: 13 in (330 mm)

General characteristics (1937 refit, where different)
- Displacement: 31,315 long tons (31,818 t) Standard; 38,450 long tons (39,070 t) (Extra-deep load)
- Beam: 104 ft (31.7 m)
- Draught: 32 ft 4 in (9.9 m)
- Installed power: 6 Admiralty 3-drum boilers; 72,000 shp (54,000 kW)
- Speed: 23 knots (43 km/h; 26 mph)
- Range: 7,579 nmi (14,036 km; 8,722 mi) at 12 kn (22 km/h; 14 mph)
- Armament: 8 × single 6-inch guns; 4 × twin 4 in (102 mm) AA guns; 4 × octuple QF 2-pdr (1.6 in (40 mm)) AA guns; 4 × quadruple Vickers 0.5 in (12.7 mm) AA machineguns
- Armour: Deck: 3.125–5 in (79–127 mm); Conning tower: 2–3 in (51–76 mm)
- Aircraft carried: 4 × amphibious aircraft
- Aviation facilities: 1 × aircraft catapult

HMS Warspite was one of five Queen Elizabeth-class battleships built for the Royal Navy during the early 1910s. Completed during the First World War in 1915, she was assigned to the Grand Fleet and participated in the Battle of Jutland. Other than that battle, and the inconclusive Action of 19 August, her service during the war generally consisted of routine patrols and training in the North Sea. During the interwar period the ship was deployed in the Atlantic Ocean and the Mediterranean Sea, often serving as flagship, and was thoroughly modernised in the mid-1930s.

During the Second World War, Warspite was involved in the Norwegian Campaign in early 1940 and was transferred to the Mediterranean later that year where the ship participated in fleet actions against the Royal Italian Navy (Regia Marina) while also escorting convoys and bombarding Italian troops ashore. She was damaged by German aircraft during the Battle of Crete in mid-1941 and required six months of repairs in the United States. They were completed after the start of the Pacific War in December and the ship sailed across the Pacific to join the Eastern Fleet in the Indian Ocean in early 1942. Warspite returned home in mid-1943 to conduct naval gunfire support as part of Force H during the Italian campaign. She was badly damaged by German radio-controlled glider bombs during the landings at Salerno and spent most of the next year under repair. The ship bombarded German positions during the Normandy landings and on Walcheren Island in 1944, despite not being fully repaired. These actions earned her the most battle honours ever awarded to an individual ship in the Royal Navy. For this and other reasons, Warspite gained the nickname the "Grand Old Lady" after a comment made by Admiral Sir Andrew Cunningham in 1943 while she was his flagship.

When she was launched in 1913, the use of oil as fuel and untried 15-inch guns were revolutionary concepts in the naval arms race between Britain and Germany, a considerable risk for Winston Churchill, then First Lord of the Admiralty, and Admiral of the Fleet Sir Jackie Fisher, who had advocated the design. However, the new "fast battleships" proved to be an outstanding success during the First World War. Decommissioned in 1945, in 1947 Warspite ran aground on rocks near Prussia Cove, Cornwall, while under tow to be scrapped, and was eventually broken up nearby.

Warspite was the sixth Royal Navy ship to bear the name. It likely originated from an archaic word for woodpecker, 'speight'; with the implication that, during the Age of Sail the war-speight would peck holes in her enemies' wooden hulls.

== Design and description ==
The Queen Elizabeth-class ships were designed to form a fast squadron for the fleet that was intended to operate against the leading ships of the opposing battleline. This required maximum offensive power and a speed several knots faster than any other battleship to allow them to defeat any type of ship.

Warspite had a length overall of 643 feet 9 inches (196.2 m), a beam of 90 feet 7 inches (27.6 m) and a deep draught of 33 feet (10.1 m). She had a normal displacement of 32,590 long tons (33,110 t) and displaced 33,260 long tons (33,794 t) at deep load. She was powered by two sets of Parsons steam turbines, each driving two shafts using steam from 24 Yarrow boilers. The turbines were rated at 75,000 shaft horsepower (56,000 kW) and intended to reach a maximum speed of 25 knots (46.3 km/h; 28.8 mph). The ship had a range of 5,000 nautical miles (9,260 km; 5,754 mi) at a cruising speed of 12 knots (22.2 km/h; 13.8 mph). Her crew numbered 1,025 officers and ratings in 1915 and 1,220 in 1920.

The Queen Elizabeth class was equipped with eight breech-loading (BL) 15-inch (381 mm) Mk I guns in four twin-gun turrets, in two superfiring pairs fore and aft of the superstructure, designated 'A', 'B', 'X', and 'Y' from front to rear. Twelve of the fourteen BL 6-inch (152 mm) Mk XII guns were mounted in casemates along the broadside of the vessel amidships; the remaining pair were mounted on the forecastle deck near the aft funnel and were protected by gun shields. The anti-aircraft (AA) armament were composed of two quick-firing (QF) 3-inch (76 mm) 20 cwt Mk I (Note: "Cwt" is the abbreviation for hundredweight, 20 cwt referring to the weight of the gun.) guns. The ships were fitted with four submerged 21-inch (533 mm) torpedo tubes, two on each broadside.

Warspite was completed with two fire-control directors fitted with 15-foot (4.6 m) rangefinders. One was mounted above the conning tower, protected by an armoured hood, and the other was in the spotting top above the tripod mast. Each turret was also fitted with a 15-foot rangefinder. The main armament could be controlled by 'B' turret as well. The secondary armament was primarily controlled by directors mounted on each side of the compass platform on the foremast once they were fitted in July 1917.

The waterline belt of the Queen Elizabeth class consisted of Krupp cemented armour (KC) that was 13 inches (330 mm) thick over the ships' vitals. The gun turrets were protected by 11 to 13 inches (279 to 330 mm) of KC armour and were supported by barbettes 7–10 inches (178–254 mm) thick. The ships had multiple armoured decks that ranged from 1 to 3 inches (25 to 76 mm) in thickness. The main conning tower was protected by 13 inches of armour. After the Battle of Jutland, 1 inch of high-tensile steel was added to the main deck over the magazines and additional anti-flash equipment was added in the magazines.

The ship was fitted with flying-off platforms mounted on the roofs of 'B' and 'X' turrets in 1918, from which fighters and reconnaissance aircraft could launch. Exactly when the platforms were removed is unknown, but no later than Warspite's 1934–1937 reconstruction.

== Construction and career ==
Warspite, the sixth warship of the Royal Navy to carry the name, was laid down on 21 October 1912 at Devonport Royal Dockyard, launched on 26 November 1913, and completed in April 1915 under the command of Captain Edward Phillpotts. Warspite joined the 2nd Battle Squadron of the Grand Fleet following a number of acceptance trials, including gunnery trials, which saw Churchill present when she fired her 15-inch (381 mm) guns. Churchill was suitably impressed with their accuracy and power. In late 1915, Warspite was grounded in the River Forth causing some damage to her hull; she had been led by her escorting destroyers down the small ships channel. After undergoing repairs for two months at Rosyth and Jarrow, she rejoined the Grand Fleet, this time as part of the new 5th Battle Squadron which had been created for Queen Elizabeth-class ships. In early December, Warspite was involved in another incident when, during an exercise, she collided with her sister ship Barham, which caused considerable damage to Warspite's bow. She made it back to Scapa Flow and from there to Devonport for more repair work, rejoining the fleet on Christmas Eve 1915.

=== First World War ===
==== Battle of Jutland (1916) ====
Following the German raid on Lowestoft in April 1916, Warspite and the 5th Battle Squadron were temporarily assigned to Vice-Admiral David Beatty's Battlecruiser Force. On 31 May, Warspite was deployed with the squadron to fight in the Battle of Jutland, the largest naval encounter between Britain and Germany during the war. Following a signalling error, the battleships were left trailing Beatty's fast ships during the battlecruiser action, and the 5th Battle Squadron was exposed to heavy fire from the German High Seas Fleet as the force turned away to the north, although Warspite was able to score her first hit on the battlecruiser Von der Tann.

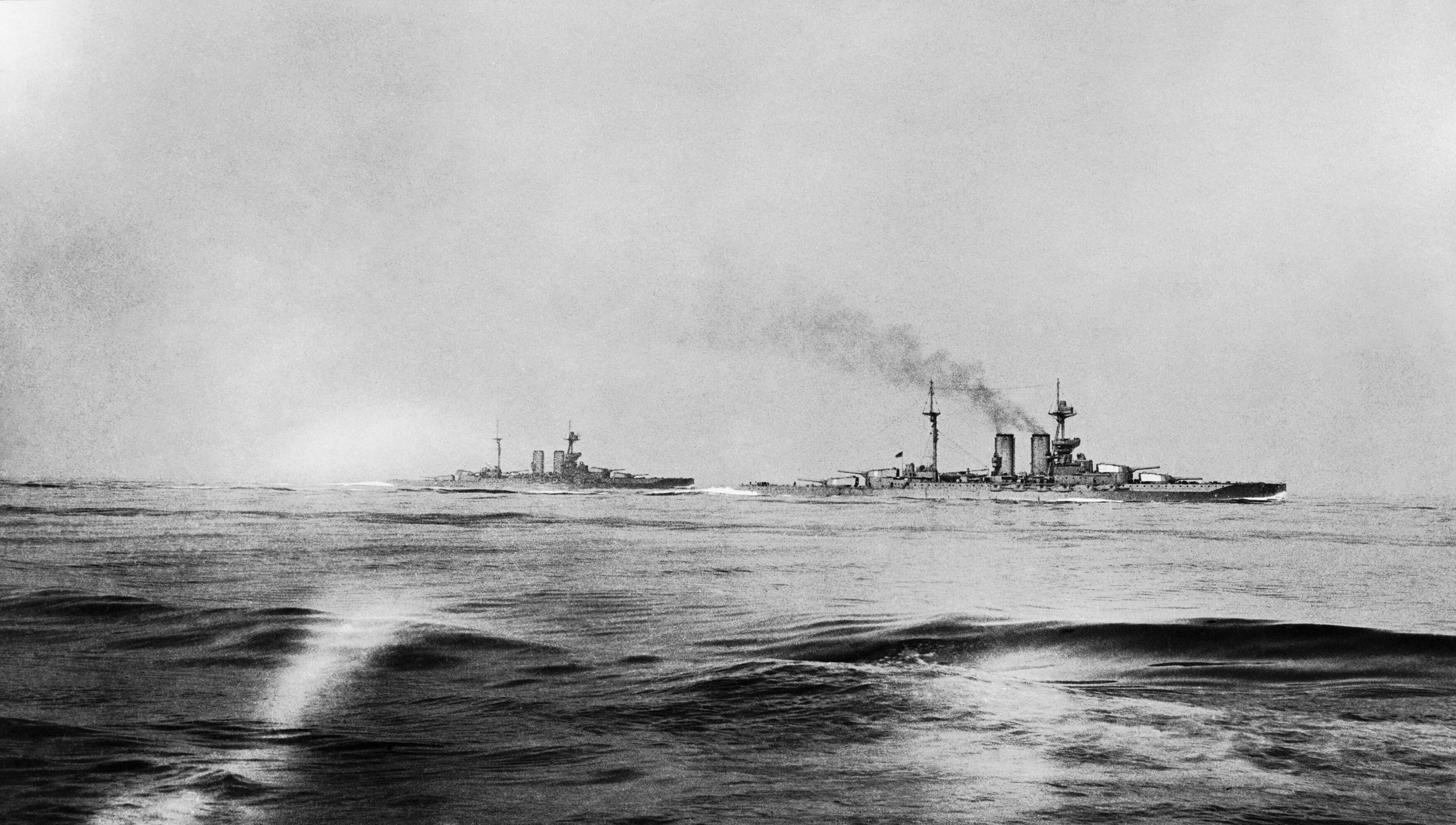
Warspite and Malaya at Jutland

The 5th Battle Squadron then headed north, exchanging fire with both Hipper's battlecruiser force and the leading elements of Scheer's battleships, damaging Markgraf. When the squadron turned to join the Grand Fleet, the damage from a shell hitting the port-wing engine room caused Warspite's steering to jam as she attempted to avoid her sister ships Valiant and Malaya. Captain Phillpotts decided to maintain course, in effect circling, rather than come to a halt and reverse. This decision exposed Warspite and made her a tempting target; she was hit multiple times, but inadvertently diverted attention from the armoured cruiser Warrior, which had been critically damaged whilst attacking the leading elements of the German fleet. This action gained her the admiration of Warrior's surviving crew, who believed that Warspite's movement had been intentional.

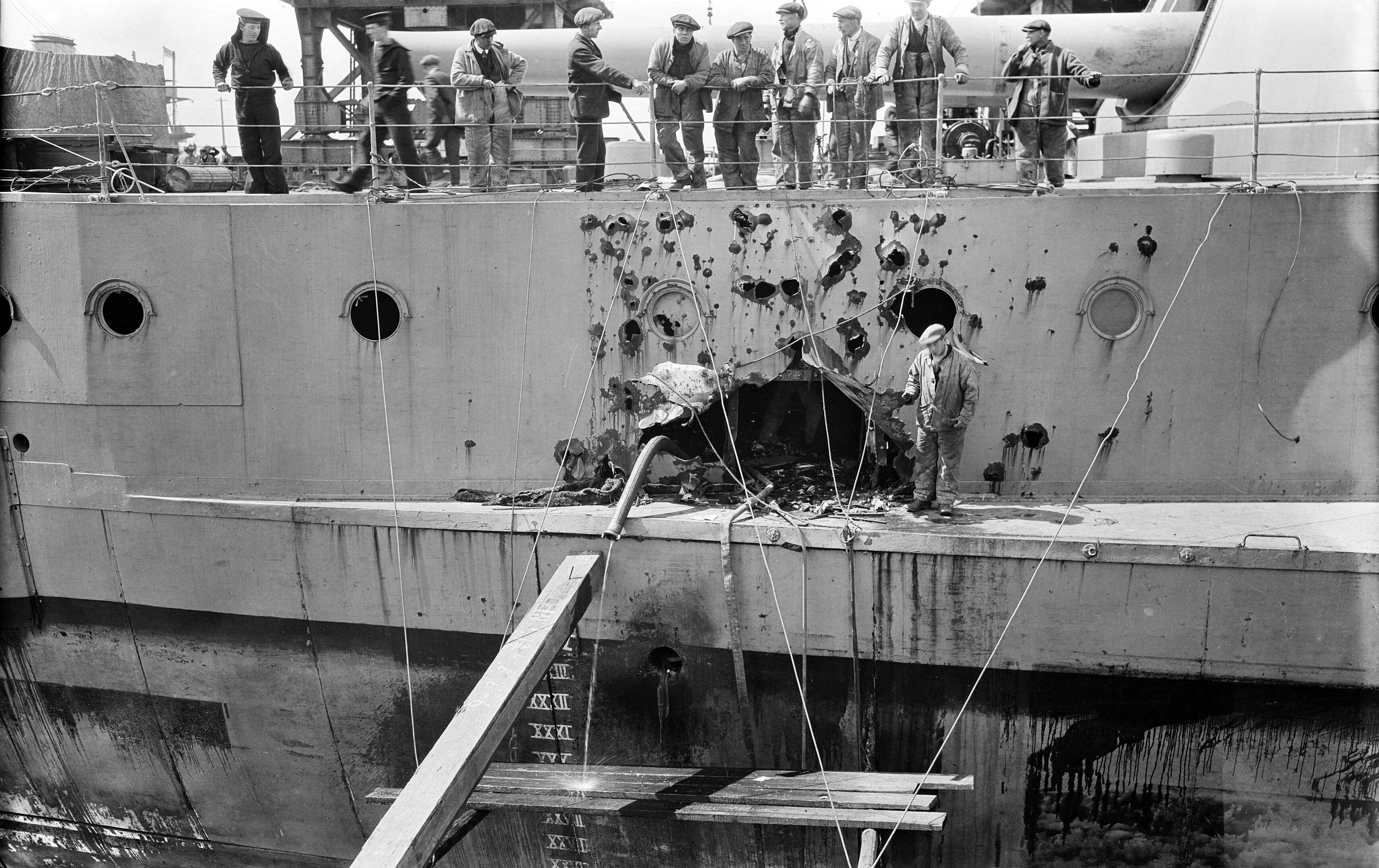
Damage caused by a shell that exploded inside the ship at Jutland

The crew regained control of Warspite after two full circles. Their efforts to end the circular motion placed her on a course which took her towards the German fleet. The rangefinders and the transmission station were non-functional and only "A" turret could fire, albeit under local control with 12 salvos falling short of their target. Sub Lieutenant Herbert Annesley Packer was subsequently promoted for his command of "A" turret. Rather than continue, Warspite was stopped for ten minutes so the crew could make repairs. They succeeded in correcting the problem, but the ship would be plagued with steering irregularities for the rest of her naval career. As the light faded the Grand Fleet crossed ahead of the German battle line and opened fire, forcing the High Seas Fleet to retreat and allowing Warspite to slip away.

Warspite was hit fifteen times during the battle, and had 14 killed and 16 wounded; among the latter warrant officer Walter Yeo, who became one of the first men to receive facial reconstruction via plastic surgery. Although she had been extensively damaged, Warspite could still raise steam and was ordered back to Rosyth during the evening of 31 May by Rear-Admiral Hugh Evan-Thomas, commander of the 5th Battle Squadron. Whilst travelling across the North Sea the ship came under attack from a German U-boat. The U-boat fired three torpedoes, all of which missed their target. Warspite later attempted to ram a surfaced U-boat. She signalled ahead for escorts and a squadron of torpedo boats came out to meet her. They were too slow to screen her effectively, but there were no more encounters with German vessels and she reached Rosyth safely on the morning of 1 June, where it took two months to repair the damage.

==== 1916–1918 ====
Upon the completion of her repairs, Warspite rejoined the 5th Battle Squadron. Further misfortune struck soon afterwards, when she collided with Valiant after a night-shooting exercise, necessitating more repair work at Rosyth. Captain Philpotts avoided reprimand on this occasion, but was moved to a shore-based job as Naval Assistant to the new First Sea Lord, Admiral Jellicoe. He was replaced by Captain de Bartolome in December 1916. In June 1917, Warspite collided with a destroyer, but did not require major repairs. Early in April 1918 she joined the Grand Fleet in a fruitless pursuit of the German High Seas Fleet which had been hunting for a convoy near Norway. In 1918, Warspite had to spend four months being repaired after a boiler room caught fire. Captain Hubert Lynes relieved Captain de Bartolome and on 21 November he took Warspite out to escort the German High Seas Fleet into internment at Scapa Flow following the signing of the Armistice.

=== Interbellum (1919–1939) ===
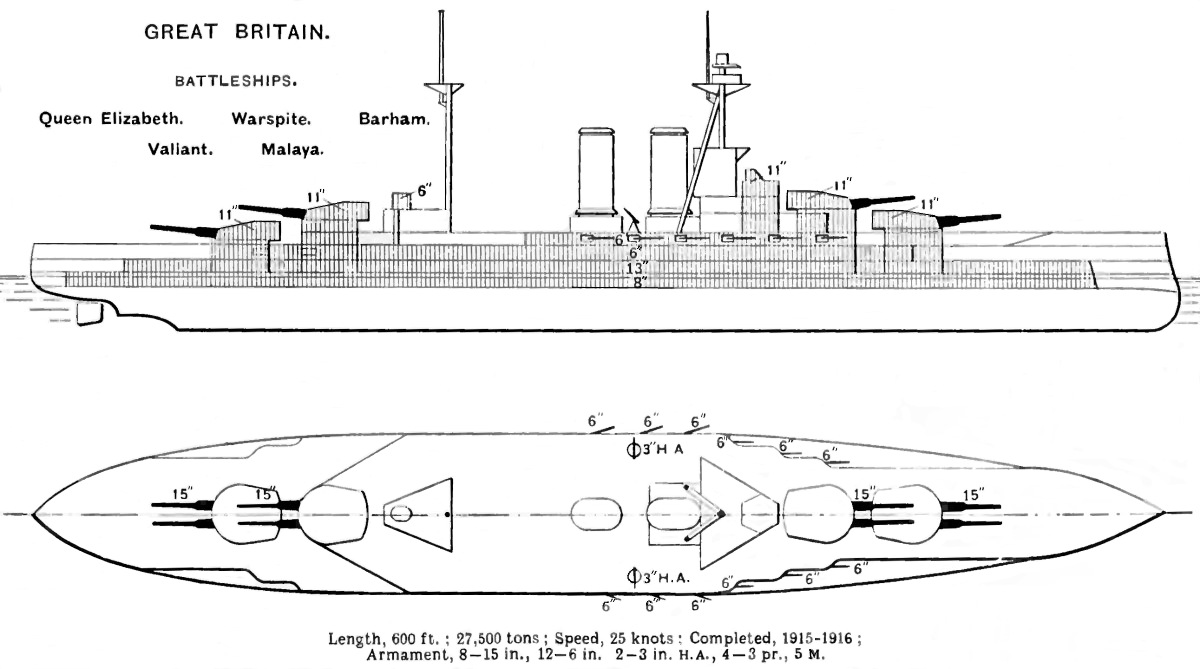
Diagram of the Queen Elizabeth class published by Brassey's Naval Annual in 1923

In 1919, Warspite joined the 2nd Battle Squadron, part of the newly formed Atlantic Fleet, and undertook regular spring cruises to the Mediterranean. In 1924, she attended a Royal Fleet Review at Spithead, presided over by King George V. Later in the year, Warspite underwent a partial modernisation that altered her superstructure by trunking her two funnels into one, enhanced her armour protection with torpedo bulges, swapped the high-angle 3-inch guns with new 4-inch anti-aircraft guns, and removed half her torpedo tubes. After the process finished in 1926, Warspite assumed the role of flagship of the Commander-in-Chief and Second-in-Command, Mediterranean Fleet. In 1927, under the command of Captain James Somerville, she struck an uncharted rock in the Aegean and was ordered to return to Portsmouth for repairs. In 1930, Warspite rejoined the Atlantic Fleet. She was at sea when the crews of a number of warships mutinied at Invergordon in September 1931, although three sailors were later dismissed from the ship. In March 1933, she was rammed in fog by a Romanian passenger ship off Portugal, but did not require major repairs.

Between March 1934 and March 1937, she underwent a major reconstruction in Portsmouth at a cost of £2,363,000. This refit gave the Admiralty a virtually new warship, replacing internal machinery and significantly changing the battleship's appearance and capabilities.

- Propulsion: The reconstruction project replaced her propulsion machinery and installed six individual boiler rooms, with Admiralty three-drum boilers, in place of 24 Yarrow boilers; geared Parsons turbines were fitted in four new engine rooms and gearing rooms. This increased fuel efficiency, reducing fuel consumption from 41 tons per hour to 27 at almost 24 knots, and gave the warship 80,000 shp. The 1,500-long-ton (1,524 t) weight saving on the lighter machinery was used to increase protection and armament.
- Armour: 1,100 long tons (1,118 t) of armour were added, improving coverage forward of A turret and the boiler rooms, as well as an increase to 5 inches over the magazines and 3.5 inches over the machinery. Better sub-division of the engineering rooms strengthened the hull and improved its integrity.
- Armament: The last pair of torpedo tubes were removed and the 6 inch guns had their protection reduced; four guns were removed from the fore and aft ends of the batteries. Eight 4 inch high-angle guns in four twin mountings and two octuple 2 pdr pom-poms were added to her anti-aircraft defences, as well as additional .50 calibre machine guns on two of the main turrets. The original 15-inch turrets were upgraded to increase the elevation of the guns by ten degrees (from 20° to 30°), providing a further 9,000 yards of range to a maximum of 32,300 yd (29.5 km) with a 6crh shell. The fire control was also modernised to include the HACS Mk III* AA fire control system and the Admiralty Fire Control Table Mk VII for surface fire control of the main armament.

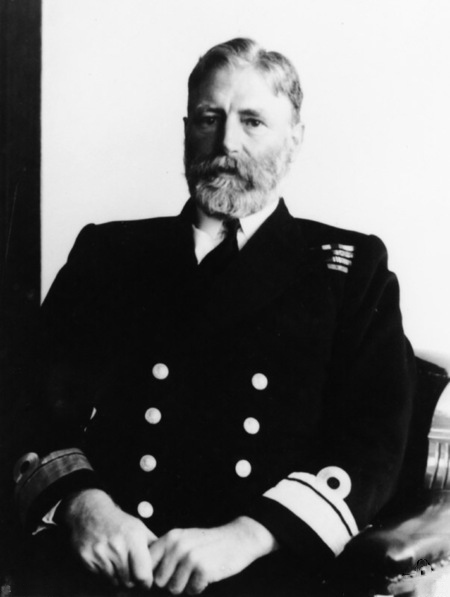
Captain Victor Crutchley VC, pictured as a Rear Admiral

Additionally, her superstructure was radically altered, allowing two cranes and an aircraft hangar to be fitted. This could carry four aircraft, but Warspite typically carried only two: from 1938 to 1941 these were Swordfish floatplanes and from 1942 to 1943 Walrus flying boats. Her tripod mast was removed and a distinctive armoured citadel built up to enclose the bridge and to provide space for her to operate as a flagship.

After completion of the refit, Warspite was recommissioned under the command of Captain Victor Crutchley. The intention was for her to become the flagship of Admiral Dudley Pound's Mediterranean Fleet, but trials revealed problems with propulsion machinery and steering, a legacy of Jutland, which continued to beset Warspite and delayed her departure. These delays and the work required to rectify them also affected the crew's leave arrangements and led to some sailors airing their views in national newspapers, angering Pound. Warspite finally entered Grand Harbour, in Malta, on 14 January 1938 and continued gunnery practice and training. At the end of one anti-aircraft exercise, a junior midshipman independently discharged his pom-pom gun after a towing aircraft flew low overhead to display its attached target to the crew. Warspite had turned towards Valletta on the exercise's conclusion and the shells hurtled towards the city. The shells landed harmlessly at a gunnery range where a platoon of the Green Howards was exercising. For the remainder of the year, she cruised the Aegean, Adriatic and Mediterranean seas, leading an intensive series of fleet exercises in August due to rising international tension. She undertook another cruise of the western Mediterranean in the spring of 1939. In June 1939, Vice Admiral Andrew Cunningham replaced Dudley Pound and took Warspite to Istanbul for talks with the Turkish government. When war was declared in September, the Mediterranean remained quiet and Warspite was recalled to join the Home Fleet following the loss of HMS Royal Oak.

=== Second World War ===
==== Atlantic and Narvik (1939–1940) ====
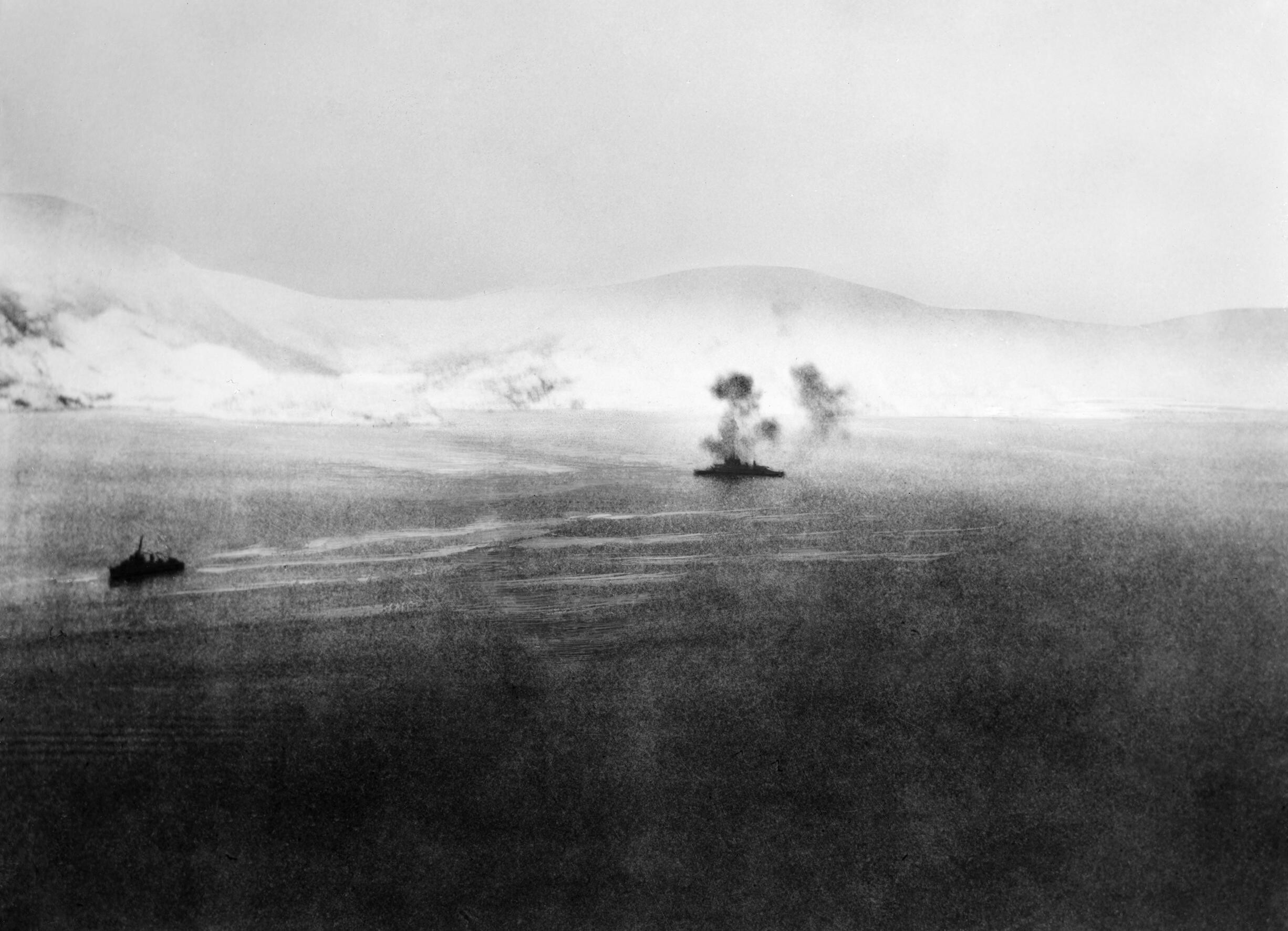
Warspite engaging shore batteries during the Second Battle of Narvik

Warspite's first task was to escort convoy HX 9 carrying fuel from Nova Scotia to the UK. She was diverted northwards in pursuit of the German battleships Scharnhorst and Gneisenau which had sunk the armed merchant cruiser Rawalpindi north of the Faroe Islands, but failed to make contact.

In April 1940, Warspite had started her voyage back to the Mediterranean when the Germans invaded Denmark and Norway; she rejoined the Home Fleet on 10 April and proceeded towards Narvik. On 13 April, Vice-Admiral William Whitworth hoisted his flag in Warspite and led nine destroyers, three sweeping mines and six in an offensive role, into Ofotfjord to neutralise a force of eight German destroyers trapped near the port of Narvik. Her Fairey Swordfish float-plane sank the German U-boat U-64 with 250 lb bombs, becoming the first aircraft to sink a U-boat in the war. The Swordfish continued to provide accurate spotting reports during the early afternoon which were, arguably, more important to the course of the battle than the Warspite's guns. The British destroyers soon opened fire on their counterparts, which had almost exhausted their fuel and ammunition following the First Naval Battle of Narvik. All were sunk during the action. Warspite destroyed the heavily damaged Z13 Erich Koellner with broadsides, while hitting Z17 Diether von Roeder and Z12 Erich Giese. Diether von Roeder had to be scuttled while Erich Giese was sunk in conjunction with destroyers HMS Punjabi and HMS Bedouin. The Second Naval Battle of Narvik was considered a success. She remained in Norwegian waters, participating in several shore bombardments around Narvik on 24 April, but these proved ineffectual and she returned to Scapa Flow prior to being redeployed to the Mediterranean on 28 April.

==== Mediterranean (1940–1941) ====
===== Calabria =====
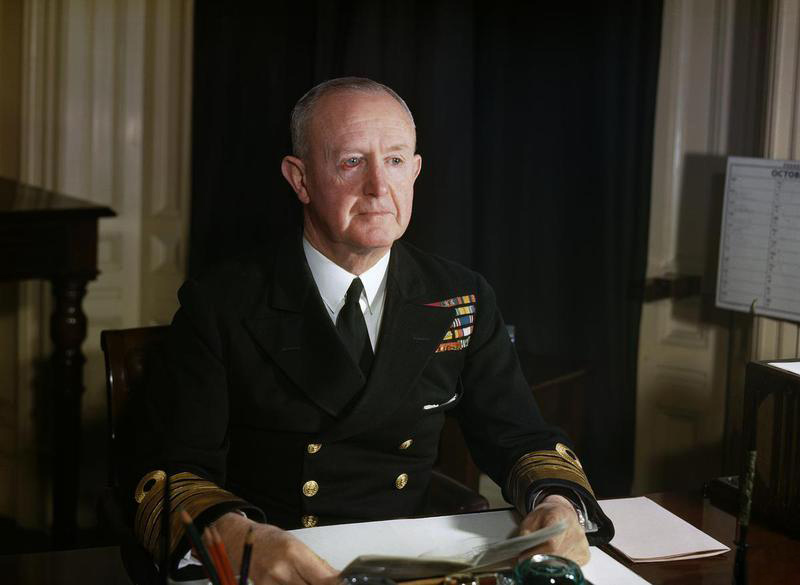
Admiral Sir Andrew Cunningham

Warspite arrived safely in Alexandria before Italy entered the war on 10 June 1940. Admiral Cunningham took the fleet to sea on 7 July to meet two convoys travelling from Malta to Alexandria, knowing that part of the Italian fleet was escorting its own convoy to Tripoli. Cunningham hoped to draw the Regia Marina into battle by sailing towards the "toe" of Italy to cut them off from their base at Taranto. The two fleets eventually met 30 miles from Punta Stilo at the Battle of Calabria on 9 July 1940. Initially, the Allied cruisers, armed with 6-inch guns, were outranged by the 8-inch guns of their heavier Italian counterparts and disengaged. Seeing that they were under pressure, Cunningham took Warspite ahead to assist his cruisers. The Italian cruisers turned away under a smoke screen while the battleships Giulio Cesare and Conte di Cavour closed on Warspite before Malaya and Royal Sovereign could catch up.

During the battle Warspite achieved one of the longest range gunnery hits from a moving ship to a moving target in history, hitting Giulio Cesare at a range of approximately 24 km (26,000 yd), the other being a shot from Scharnhorst which hit Glorious at approximately the same distance in June 1940. The shell pierced Giulio Cesare's rear funnel and detonated inside it, blowing out a hole nearly 6.1 meters (20 ft) across, while fragments started several fires and their smoke was drawn into the boiler rooms, forcing four boilers off-line as their operators could not breathe which reduced the ship's speed to 18 knots (33 km/h; 21 mph). Uncertain how severe the damage was, Campioni ordered his battleships to turn away in the face of superior British numbers and they disengaged behind a smoke screen laid by Italian destroyers. The destroyers and cruisers on both sides continued shooting for half an hour but with Malaya and Royal Sovereign coming into range, the Italian fleet disengaged. Over 125 aircraft of the Regia Aeronautica attacked the ships over the next three hours but caused no damage. Warspite returned to Alexandria on 13 July.

===== Taranto =====
In mid-August, she set out to bombard Bardia and on 6 November she sailed from Alexandria to provide cover for the Battle of Taranto, a torpedo-bomber attack on ships in Taranto harbour. As a result of this attack, Warspite and Valiant were able to bombard the Italian supply base in the Adriatic port of Vlorë in mid-December. On 10 January 1941, Warspite was lightly damaged by a bomb while operating with Force A during Operation Excess.

===== Matapan =====
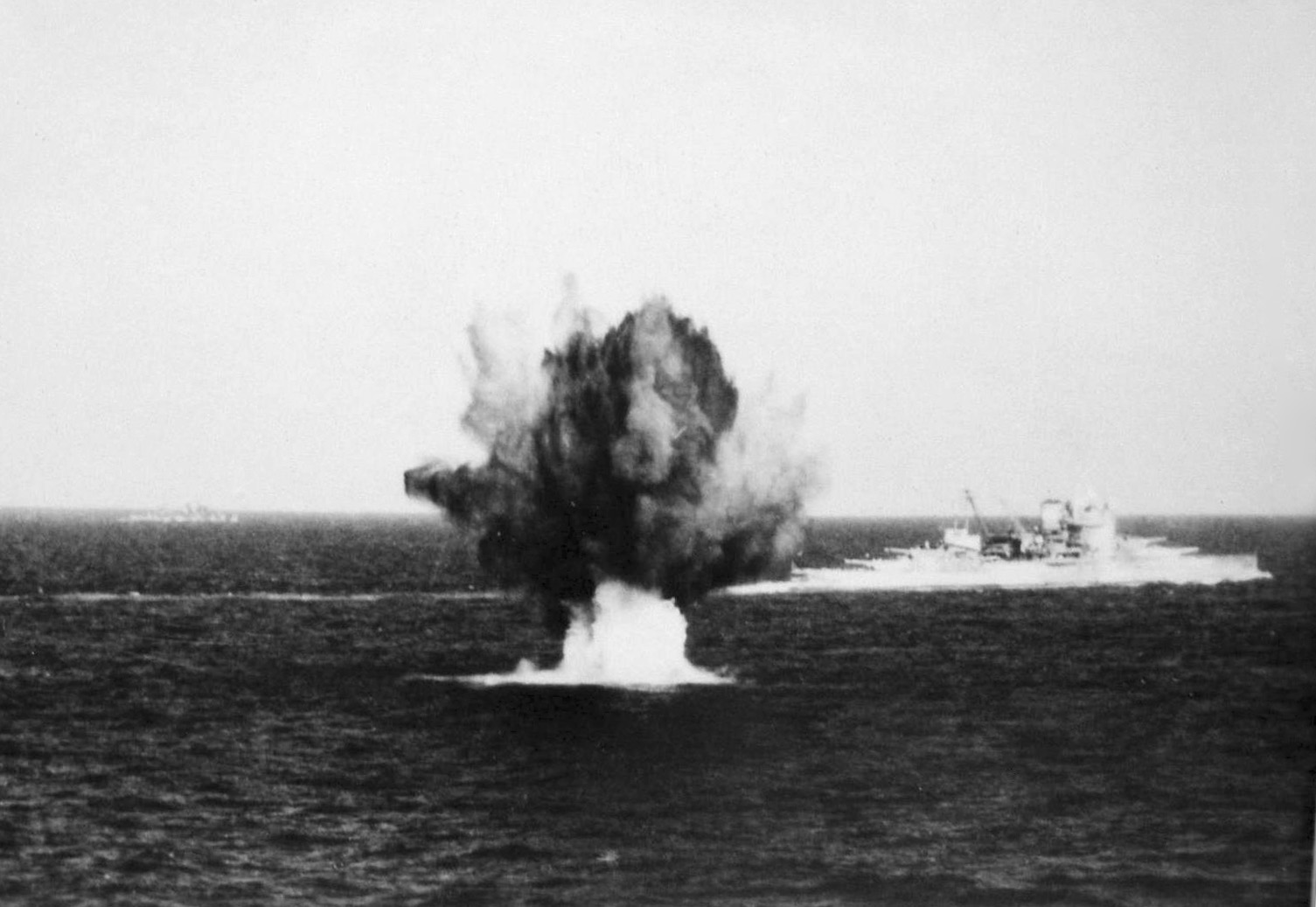
Warspite under attack in the Mediterranean, 1941

In March 1941, to support the planned German invasion of the Balkans, Vice Admiral Angelo Iachino's Italian fleet, led by the battleship Vittorio Veneto, sailed to intercept Allied convoys between Egypt and Greece. Warned of the Italian intentions by intelligence from the Government Code and Cypher School at Bletchley Park, Admiral Cunningham took his fleet to sea on 27 March 1941, flying his flag on Warspite. On 28 March, the British cruisers encountered the Italian fleet and were forced to turn away by the heavy guns of Vittorio Veneto. To save his cruisers Cunningham ordered an air attack, prompting Iachino to retreat. Subsequent air attacks damaged the battleship and the cruiser Pola, slowing the former and crippling the latter. Vittorio Veneto escaped to the west as dusk fell but the British pursued through the night, first detecting Pola on radar and then two of her sister ships. Warspite, Valiant and Barham closed on the unsuspecting Italian ships and aided by searchlights, destroyed the heavy cruisers Fiume and Zara and two destroyers at point blank range. Pola was also sunk once her crew had been taken off. Having established by aerial reconnaissance that the rest of the Italian fleet had escaped, Warspite returned to Alexandria on 29 March, surviving air attacks without suffering casualties.

The Battle of Cape Matapan had a paralysing effect on the Regia Marina, providing the Royal Navy with an opportunity to tighten its grip on the Mediterranean, as evidenced by the unequal Battle of the Tarigo Convoy near the Kerkennah Islands on 16 April. This was not enough and the success of the Afrika Korps in North Africa induced Churchill to order a desperate attack on Tripoli to block the Axis supply route by sinking a battleship in the harbour. Cunningham rejected this plan, but on 21 April he sailed with Warspite to bombard the harbour in company with Barham and Valiant, the cruiser Gloucester and several destroyers. The raid was ineffectual, partly because of poor visibility created by dust from an earlier RAF bombing raid; the fleet returned to Alexandria without damage. The futility of the mission and the exposure of his battleships led to a tense exchange of letters between Cunningham and Churchill.

===== Crete =====
During the Battle of Crete, Warspite was used as a floating anti-aircraft battery and like many other ships, suffered severe damage from German air attacks on 22 May. A 500 lb bomb damaged her starboard 4-inch and 6-inch batteries, ripped open the ship's side and killed 38 men. The attack was carried out by Jagdgeschwader 77 (JG 77—Fighter Wing 77). Oberleutnant Kurt Ubben, a future flying ace with 110 enemy aircraft shot down, claimed a hit on the warship. She was able to make it back to port under her own steam, but the damage could not be repaired in Alexandria and it was decided that she would have to be sent to Bremerton on the west coast of the United States.

==== Repair and refit ====
In June 1941, Warspite departed Alexandria for the Bremerton Naval Shipyard in the United States, arriving there on 11 August, having travelled through the Suez Canal, across the Indian Ocean to Ceylon, stopping at Manila, then Pearl Harbor and finally Esquimalt along the way. Repairs and modifications began in August, including the replacement of her deteriorated 15-inch guns, the addition of more anti-aircraft weapons, improvements to the bridge, and new surface and anti-aircraft radar. Warspite was still at the shipyard when the Japanese Navy attacked Pearl Harbor and went on alert as she would have been one of the few ships in the harbour which could have provided anti-aircraft defence should the Japanese have struck east. She was recommissioned on 28 December and undertook sea trials near Vancouver before sailing down the west coast of the U.S. and Mexico, crossing the equator and arriving in Sydney on 20 February 1942. She joined the Eastern Fleet at Trincomalee in March 1942.

==== Indian Ocean (1942–1943) ====
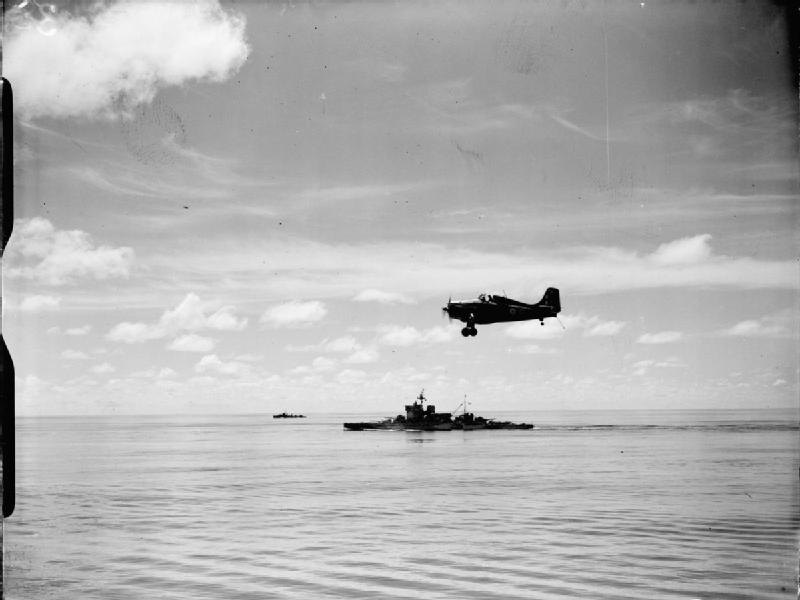
A Grumman Martlet from HMS Formidable flying near HMS Warspite during operations off Madagascar

Warspite joined the Eastern Fleet as flagship of Admiral Sir James Somerville, who had commanded her in 1927. Initially, Warspite was based in Ceylon, forming a fast group with the aircraft carriers Formidable and Indomitable, four cruisers and six destroyers. In March, Somerville received intelligence indicating the Japanese Fast Carrier Strike Force was heading towards the Indian Ocean and he relocated his base to Addu Atoll in the Maldives. Vice Admiral Chuichi Nagumo used five carriers and four battleships in the Indian Ocean raid a naval sortie into the Indian Ocean in April, attacking Allied shipping and bases in the Indian Ocean and the Bay of Bengal. Somerville's fleet was outnumbered and outclassed but he hoped to get close enough to launch a night-time torpedo bomber attack. Warspite's fast group set sail to intercept on 4 April, detecting the Japanese attack on the cruisers Cornwall and Dorsetshire and later, a scouting aircraft from the cruiser Tone. The fleets did not meet; Warspite withdrew to Addu Atoll and then to Kilindini on the East African coast to protect the convoy routes. The Japanese believed that she was still in Sydney and ordered the attack on Sydney Harbour.

During May and June, Warspite continued to act as Somerville's flagship, carrying out exercises with other elements of the fleet and shore-based aircraft in Ceylon. In early June, she was sent to hunt the Japanese auxiliary cruisers Aikoku Maru and Hōkoku Maru near the Chagos Archipelago but failed to find them.

In August, she was involved in Operation Stab, a simulated attack on the Andaman Islands to distract the Japanese from U.S. preparations to attack Guadalcanal. She covered the landings at Mahajanga and Tamatave during the Battle of Madagascar an Allied invasion, in September. Her surface radar was replaced in Durban in October and Captain Packer, her former Assistant Gunnery Officer at Jutland, took command in January 1943. The remainder of Warspite's cruise was uneventful. She underwent a short refit in Durban in April and returned to the UK in May 1943, having sailed approximately 160,000 miles since the war began.

==== Mediterranean (1943–1944) ====
Warspite underwent a short refit in May in another attempt to fix her steering problem, then joined Force H at Scapa Flow, departing on 9 June for Gibraltar in company with five other battleships, two carriers and twelve destroyers. Assigned to Division 2 with Valiant and Formidable, she returned to Alexandria on 5 July in preparation for Operation Husky, the Allied invasion of Sicily. Division One and Two rendezvoused in the Gulf of Sirte on 9 July and covered the assembling convoys. Warspite was detached to refuel at Malta on 12 July, the first visit by a British battleship since December 1940. On 17 July, she bombarded Catania in support of an unsuccessful attack by the 8th Army, although her steering problem temporarily delayed her taking up position. She returned to Malta at high speed on 18 July, avoiding several air attacks during the night. On her return, Admiral Cunningham inadvertently coined the nickname by which she would be known thereafter when he signalled: "Operation well carried out. There is no question when the old lady lifts her skirts she can run."

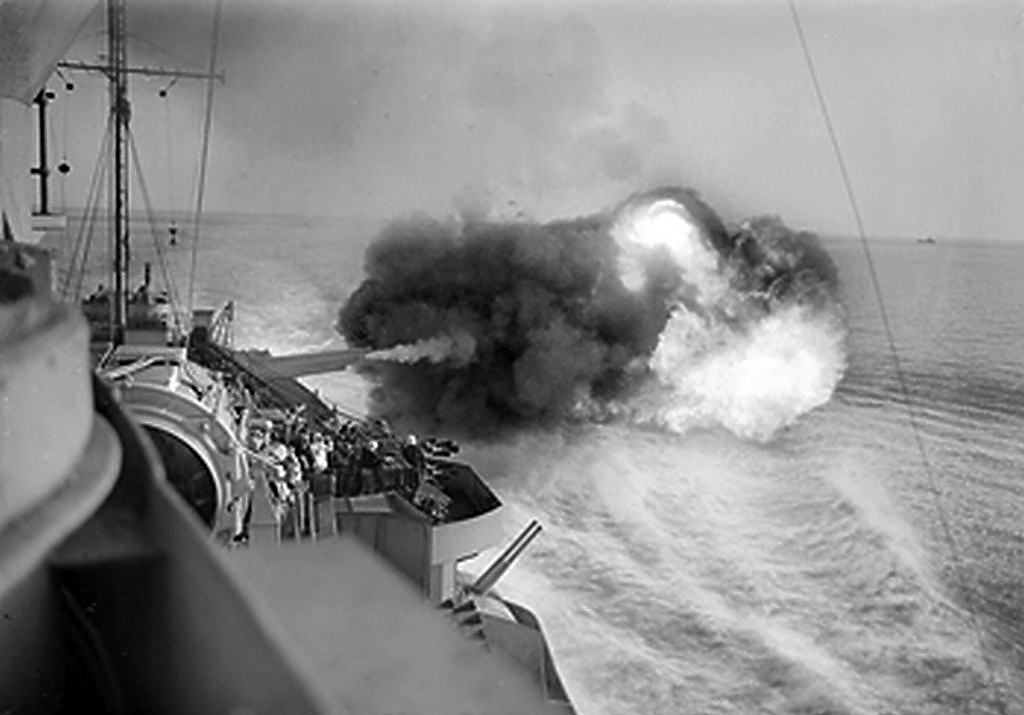
Warspite shelling German positions at Catania, July 1943

Between 2 and 3 September, Warspite and Valiant covered the assault across the Straits of Messina and bombarded the Italian coastal batteries near Reggio. Between 8 and 9 September, Force H, covering the landings at Salerno, came under fierce German air-attack and narrowly avoided being torpedoed. The resolve of the Italian Government had already been wavering by the time of the Allies victory in North Africa; the invasion of Sicily and aerial attacks on mainland Italy encouraged negotiations. They signed an armistice on 3 September, which took effect on 8 September. Anxious to ensure that the Germans did not acquire an additional 200 warships, the Allies insisted that the Regia Marina must sail for Allied ports. Three days later, Warspite met and led elements of the Italian Fleet, including Vittorio Veneto and Italia, into internment at Malta. She repeated this process on 12 September for her opponent from the Battle of Calabria, Giulio Cesare.

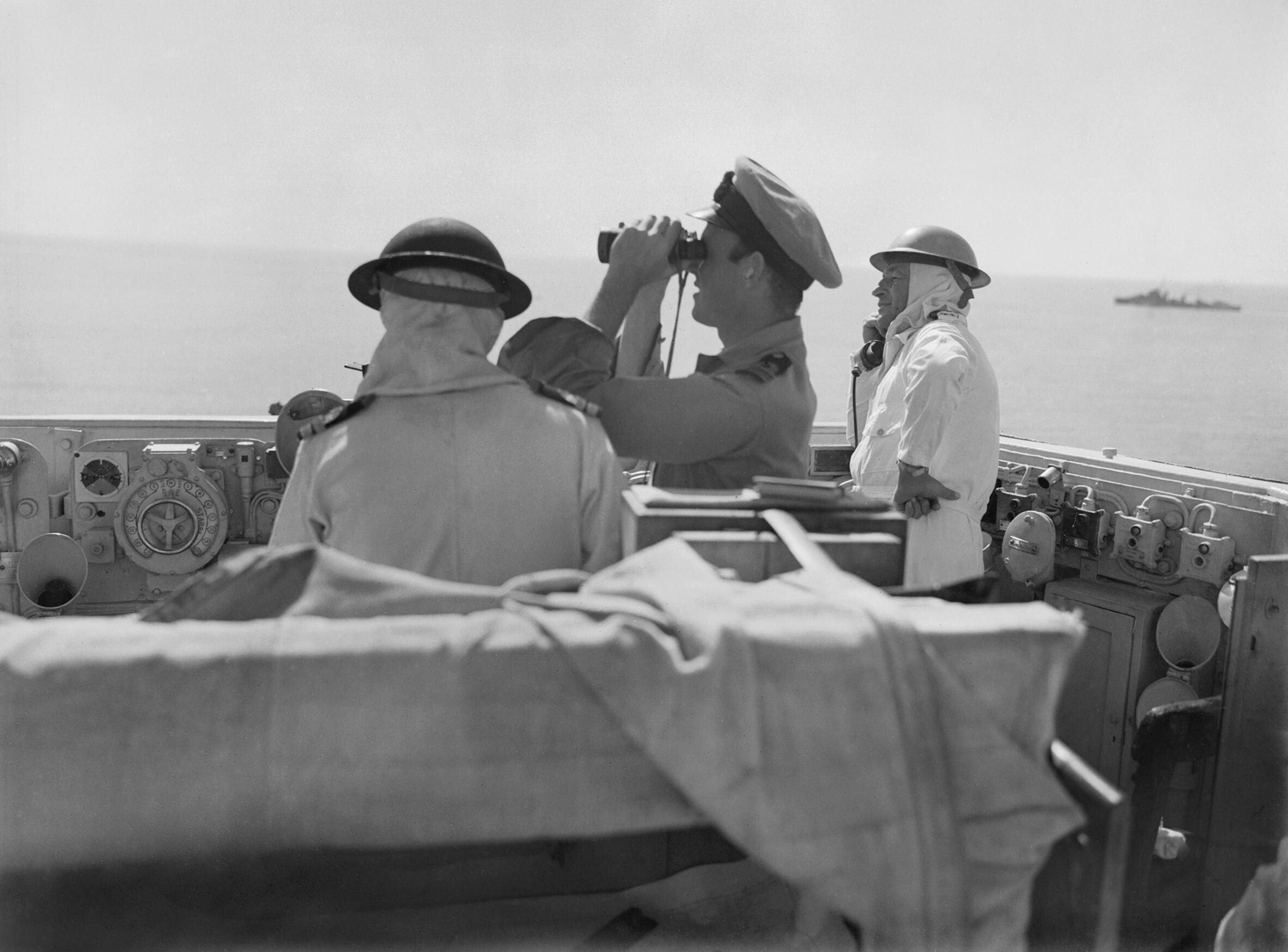
Captain Packer (right) directing the bombardment at Reggio, September 1943

On 14 September, Force H was recalled to the UK to begin preparations for the invasion of France, but Warspite and Valiant were detached to provide support for Allied forces at Salerno. Although the Italians had surrendered, the Germans had anticipated this and moved forces into position to block the Allied landings. The American forces near Battipaglia were in a precarious situation following German counter-attacks. After arriving off Salerno on 15 September, Warspite bombarded an ammunition dump and other positions around Altavilla Silentina, demoralising the German forces and providing time for Allied reinforcements to arrive. Overnight, the fleet came under intense air attack, but she was able to continue bombardment duties the next day. However, early in the afternoon she was attacked by a Luftwaffe squadron of Focke-Wulf Fw 190 fighter bombers and then, from high altitude, by three Dornier Do 217 bombers from KG 100 armed with an early guided bomb, the Fritz X. She was hit directly once; a second near-miss ripped open the torpedo bulges while the third missed altogether. The bomb that did hit her struck near the funnel, cutting through her decks and making a 20-foot hole in the bottom of her hull, crippling her. Although the damage had been considerable, Warspite's casualties amounted to only nine killed and fourteen wounded.

She was soon on the journey to Malta, escorted by the anti-aircraft cruiser Delhi and four destroyers, while being towed by United States Navy tugs. Towing a ship of Warspite's dimensions proved difficult, and at one stage she broke all tow lines and drifted sideways through the Straits of Messina. She reached Malta on 19 September and undertook emergency repairs before being towed to Gibraltar on 12 November. Warspite returned to Britain in March 1944 to continue her repairs at Rosyth. Captain Packer was mentioned in despatches for his actions bringing the ship to Malta, the second time he had limped into port on board a heavily damaged Warspite.

==== North-Western Europe (1944–1945) ====
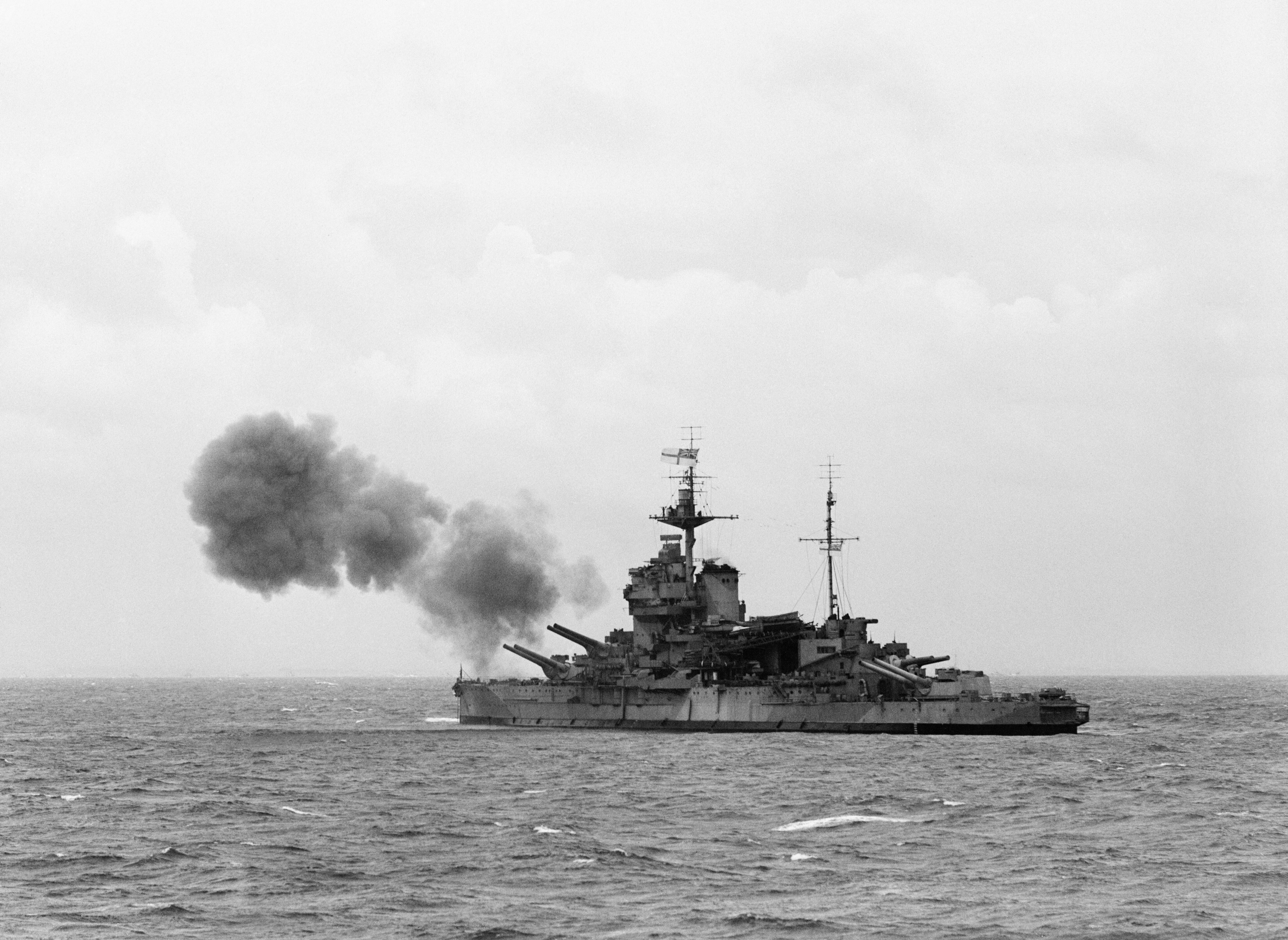
Warspite bombarding defensive positions off Normandy, 6 June 1944. Note the non-operational X (upper rear) turret.

At Rosyth, Warspite's 6-inch guns were removed and plated in, and a concrete caisson covered the hole left by the German bomb. One of her boiler rooms and the X turret could not be repaired, remaining out of action for the remainder of her career. She left Greenock on 2 June 1944 with six 15-inch guns, eight 4-inch anti-aircraft guns and forty pom poms, joining Bombardment Force D of the Eastern Task Force of the Normandy invasion fleet off Plymouth two days later.

At 0500 on 6 June 1944, Warspite was the first ship to open fire, bombarding the German battery at Villerville from a position 26,000 yards offshore, to support landings by the British 3rd Division on Sword Beach. She continued bombardment duties on 7 June, but after firing over 300 shells she had to rearm and crossed the Channel to Portsmouth. She returned to Normandy on 9 June to support American forces at Utah Beach and then, on 11 June, she took up position off Gold Beach to support the British 69th Infantry Brigade near Cristot. On 12 June, she returned to Portsmouth to rearm, but her guns were worn out so she was ordered to sail to Rosyth via the Straits of Dover, the first British battleship to have done so since the war began. She evaded German coastal batteries, partly due to effective radar jamming, but hit a mine 28 miles off Harwich early on 13 June. Repairs to her propeller shafts and the replacement of the guns took until early August; she sailed to Scapa Flow to calibrate the new barrels with only three functional shafts, limiting her top speed to 15 knots, although by now the Admiralty considered her main role was that of a bombardment vessel.

Warspite arrived off Ushant on 25 August 1944 and attacked the coastal batteries at Le Conquet and Pointe Saint-Mathieu during the Battle for Brest. The U.S. VIII Corps eventually captured "Festung Brest" on 19 September, but by then Warspite had moved on to the next port. In company with the monitor Erebus, she carried out a preparatory bombardment of targets around Le Havre prior to Operation Astonia on 10 September, leading to the capture of the town two days later. Her final task was to support an Anglo-Canadian operation to open up the port of Antwerp, which had been captured in September, by clearing the Scheldt Estuary of German strongholds and gun emplacements. With the monitors Erebus and Roberts, she bombarded targets on Walcheren Island on 1 November 1944, returning to Deal the next day, having fired her guns for the last time.

=== Decommissioning ===
During her service career, Warspite had lived up to her motto, enduring shellfire, bombing, ramming, mines and a guided bomb. However, time had taken its toll and more modern ships were required to continue the war in the Far East. Although there were proposals to retain her as a museum ship, the Admiralty approved Warspite's scrapping in July 1946 and she sailed from Spithead into Portsmouth to have her guns removed.

On 19 April 1947, Warspite departed Portsmouth for scrapping at Faslane, on the River Clyde. On the way, she encountered a severe storm and the hawser of the naval tug Bustler parted, whilst the other tug Metinda III slipped her tow. In storm force conditions, Warspite dropped one of her anchors in Mount's Bay, which did not hold, and the storm drove her onto Mount Mopus Ledge near Cudden Point. Later refloating herself she went hard aground a few yards away in Prussia Cove. Her skeleton crew of seven was saved by the Penlee Lifeboat W. & S. There were several attempts to refloat her but the hull was badly damaged.

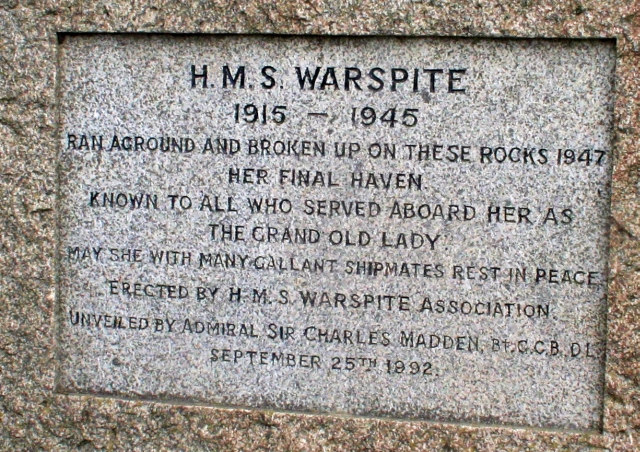
Memorial in Marazion

In 1950, an attempt to re-float her was tried. A large crowd and the media watched on as the salvage crew set to work. Despite the use of 24 compressor tanks pumping air into her tanks, the salvage failed. There was insufficient depth of water to float her clear of the reef in a rising south westerly gale. The salvage boat Barnet, standing guard overnight under the Warspite's bows was holed in the engine room, towed off and eventually drifted ashore at Long Rock, a few miles to the west. However, by August the battleship was finally beached off St Michael's Mount and after further salvage another attempt was made to refloat her in November. The Falmouth tug Masterman spent the night on the Hogus Rocks after failing to tow Warspite; and her sister tug Tradesman had 60 feet (18 m) of wire wrapped around her propeller when trying to haul Masterman off the rocks. Aided by her compressor and two jet engines from an experimental aircraft the hulk was finally moved 130 feet (40 m) closer to shore on Marazion beach, between St Michael's Mount and Hogus rocks. From 1951, Warspite was progressively broken up and scrapped in situ on the beach and by the summer of 1955, on-site scrapping resulted in her disappearance from view. According to the contractors, it remains the largest salvage operation ever carried out in British waters.

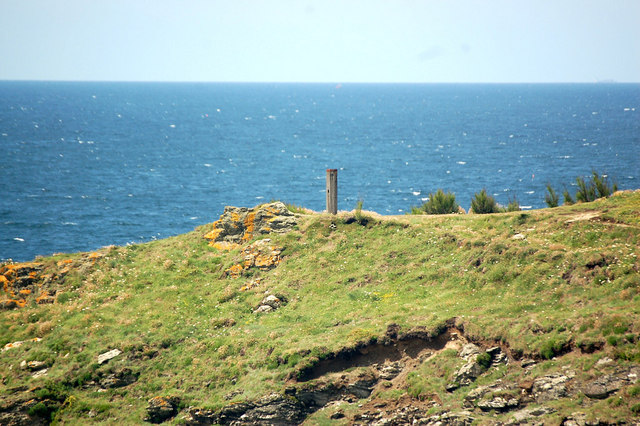
Warspite Memorial, Prussia Cove

A memorial stone was placed near the sea wall at Marazion and later moved a short distance. The stone was unveiled by Admiral Sir Charles Madden and prayers were read by a former crew member. The remains of the masts lie in the yard at Porthenalls House, Prussia Cove and one portion was erected on a headland, overlooking Prussia Cove. One of her 15-inch tompions and her chapel door are held by the National Museum of the Royal Navy in Portsmouth. Her nameplate was held by the pub, The Wink, in Lamorna, Cornwall but has since been sold at auction. Her ship's wheel was given by King George VI to King Haakon VII of Norway in 1947, who later gave it to the City of Narvik. It is kept in the City Hall of Narvik. Her white ensign and other artefacts are held in Marazion Museum. Timbers from the ship would also be used to create commemorative souvenirs of various types, such as ashtrays and letter openers, as well as teak benches, including ones at the Castle on St Michael's Mount and in Morrab Gardens, Penzance.

== Battle honours ==
This Warspite earned 15 of the 25 battle honours awarded to Royal Navy ships of this name.

First World War

- Jutland 1916

Second World War

- Atlantic 1939
- Narvik 1940
- Norway 1940
- Calabria 1940
- Mediterranean 1940–41–43
- Malta Convoys 1941
- Matapan 1941
- Crete 1941
- Sicily 1943
- Salerno 1943
- English Channel 1944
- Normandy 1944
- Biscay 1944
- Walcheren 1944

== Bibliography ==
- Admiralty Historical Section (2002). The Royal Navy and the Mediterranean. Whitehall Histories, Naval Staff Histories. Vol. II: November 1940 – December 1941. London: Whitehall History in association with Frank Cass. ISBN 0-7146-5205-9.
- Angolia, John; Bender, Roger (1981). On the Field of Honor: A History of the Knight's Cross Bearers. Vol. 2. San Jose: R. James Bender Pub. ISBN 978-0-91213821-3.
- Ballantyne, Iain (2013). Warspite, From Jutland Hero to Cold War Warrior. Barnsley, UK: Pen & Sword Maritime. ISBN 978-1-84884-350-9.
- Brooks, John (2005). Dreadnought Gunnery and the Battle of Jutland. London: Routledge. ISBN 978-0-7146-5702-8.
- Brown, David K. (2000). Nelson to Vanguard: Warship Design and Development 1923-1945. London: Chatham Publishing. ISBN 1-55750-492-X.
- Brown, Robert (2017). Battleship Warspite: Detailed in the Original Builders' Plans. Barnsley, UK: Seaforth Publishing. ISBN 978-1-5267-1937-9.
- Burt, R. A. (2012a). British Battleships, 1919–1939 (2nd ed.). Annapolis, Maryland: Naval Institute Press. ISBN 978-1-59114-052-8.
- Burt, R. A. (2012b). British Battleships of World War One (2nd ed.). Annapolis, Maryland: Naval Institute Press. ISBN 978-0-87021-863-7.
- Campbell, John (1972). Queen Elizabeth Class. Warship Monographs. Vol. 2. London: Conway Maritime Press. ISBN 0-85177-052-5.
- Campbell, N. J. M. (1980). "Great Britain". In Chesneau, Roger (ed.). Conway's All the World's Fighting Ships 1922–1946. New York: Mayflower Books. pp. 2–85. ISBN 0-8317-0303-2.
- Campbell, N. J. M. (1985). Jutland: An Analysis of the Fighting. Naval Institute Press. ISBN 0-87021-324-5.
- Churchill, Winston S. (1985). The Gathering Storm: The Second World War Volume I. Houghton Mifflin Harcourt. ISBN 978-0-39541-055-4.
- Churchill, Winston S. (2010). The Grand Alliance: The Second World War Volume III. New York: Rosetta Books. ISBN 978-0-79530-612-9.
- Director of Naval Construction (1952). H.M. Ships Damaged or Sunk by Enemy Action, 1939–1945 (PDF). Britain: Admiralty. Archived from the original (PDF) on 10 June 2016.
- Garzke, William H. & Dulin, Robert O. (1985). Battleships: Axis and Neutral Battleships in World War II. Annapolis, Maryland: Naval Institute Press. ISBN 978-0-87021-101-0.
- Gordon, Andrew (2012). The Rules of the Game: Jutland and British Naval Command. Annapolis, Maryland: Naval Institute Press. ISBN 978-1-59114-336-9.
- Hoyt, Edwin Palmer (2006). Backwater War: The Allied Campaign in Italy, 1943–45. Stackpole Books. ISBN 978-0-81173-382-3.
- Jellicoe, John (1919). The Grand Fleet, 1914–1916: Its Creation, Development, and Work. New York: George H. Doran Company. OCLC 13614571.
- Konstam, Angus (2009). British Battleships, 1939–45 (I): Queen Elizabeth and Royal Sovereign Classes. Osprey Publishing. ISBN 978-1-84603-388-9.
- Marder, Arthur J. (1978). From the Dreadnought to Scapa Flow, The Royal Navy in the Fisher Era, 1904–1919. Vol. III: Jutland and After, May 1916 – December 1916 (Second ed.). London: Oxford University Press. ISBN 0-19-215841-4.
- Massie, Robert K. (2003). Castles of Steel: Britain, Germany, and the Winning of the Great War at Sea. New York: Random House. ISBN 0-679-45671-6.
- Miller, Nathan (1997). War at Sea: A Naval History of World War II. London: Oxford University Press. ISBN 978-0-19511-038-8.
- O'Hara, Vincent P. (2013). The German Fleet at War, 1939–1945. Naval Institute Press. ISBN 978-1-61251-397-3.
- Parkes, Oscar (1990) [1966]. British Battleships, Warrior 1860 to Vanguard 1950: A History of Design, Construction, and Armament (New & rev. ed.). Annapolis, Maryland: Naval Institute Press. ISBN 1-55750-075-4.
- Plevy, Harry (2001). Battleship Sailors: The Fighting Career of HMS Warspite Recalled by Her Men. Chatham Publishing. ISBN 978-1-86176-151-4.
- Preston, Antony (1985). "Great Britain and Empire Forces". In Gray, Randal (ed.). Conway's All the World's Fighting Ships 1906–1921. Annapolis, Maryland: Naval Institute Press. pp. 1–104. ISBN 0-85177-245-5.
- Raven, Alan; Roberts, John A. (1976). British Battleships of World War Two: The Development and Technical History of the Royal Navy's Battleship and Battlecruisers from 1911 to 1946. Naval Institute Press. ISBN 0-87021-817-4.
- Rohwer, Jürgen (2005). Chronology of the War at Sea 1939–1945: The Naval History of World War Two (Third Revised ed.). Annapolis, Maryland: Naval Institute Press. ISBN 1-59114-119-2.
- Roskill, Stephen W. (1997) [1957]. HMS Warspite: The Story of a Famous Battleship. Naval Institute Press. ISBN 978-1-55750-719-8.
- Sandler, Stanley (2001). World War II in the Pacific: An Encyclopedia. Taylor & Francis. ISBN 978-0-81531-883-5.
- Shores, Christopher; Cull, Brian & Malizia, Nicola (1987). Air War for Yugoslavia, Greece, and Crete. London: Grub Street. ISBN 0-948817-07-0.
- Silverstone, Paul H. (1984). Directory of the World's Capital Ships. New York: Hippocrene Books. ISBN 0-88254-979-0.
- Sutherland, Jon; Canwell, Diane (2010). The Battle of Jutland. Pen & Sword Maritime. ISBN 978-1-84415-529-3.
- Tarrant, V. E. (1999) [1995]. Jutland: The German Perspective: A New View of the Great Battle, 31 May 1916. London: Brockhampton Press. ISBN 1-86019-917-8.
- Watton, Ross (1986). The Battleship Warspite. London: Conway Maritime Press. ISBN 1-59114-039-0.
- Whitley, M. J. (1999). Battleships of World War Two: An International Encyclopedia. Annapolis, Maryland: Naval Institute Press. ISBN 1-55750-184-X.
