= David Lambkin =

English novelist

- Born: David Lesley Goatham; October 31, 1947 (age 78)
- Occupation: Novelist
- Writing career
- Pen name: David Lambkin
- Language: English

David Lesley Goatham, better known by his pen name David Lambkin, is an English novelist.

== Background ==
Born in the United Kingdom, he spent many years in South Africa and Kenya. Lambkin divides his time between running his advertising agency in Johannesburg and writing novels and articles (for National Geographic i.a.).

== Writing ==
Lambkin's novels are mainly crime fiction set in Kenya with White protagonists.

Lambkin won the South African Central News Agency Literary Award for best debut work for his first novel, "Plain of Darkness", in 1992. He was voted "Author of the Year" by The Star (South Africa) newspaper in 1995 for his novel "The Hanging Tree" and in 2002 for "Night Jasmine Man". Both "The Hanging Tree" and "Night Jasmine Man" are set in Kenya. His fourth novel, "The Voyeur" is set on Zanzibar. Lambkin is also compiling a cookbook on Swahili cuisine and has written scripts for wildlife documentaries.

His books have been reviewed in Publishers Weekly, Chicago Tribune, World Literature Today, Kirkus Reviews among other places.

== Hobbies ==
Lambkin is an amateur naturalist, clay pigeon shot, fisherman, wine lover, fan of Johann Sebastian Bach and Ludwig van Beethoven, and an enthusiastic albeit untrained cook.

== Publications ==
- Plain of Darkness (1992)
- The Hanging Tree (1995)
- Night Jasmine Man (2002)
- The Voyeur (2005)
