= South African literature =

South African literature is the literature of South Africa, which has 11 national languages: Afrikaans, English, Zulu, Xhosa, Sotho, Pedi, Tswana, Venda, Swazi, Tsonga and Ndebele.

== Overview ==
Elleke Boehmer (cf. Cullhed, 2006: 79) writes: "Nationalism, like patriarchy, favours singleness—one identity, one growth pattern, one birth and blood for all ... [and] will promote specifically unitary or 'one-eyed' forms of consciousness". The first problem any student of South African literature confronts is the diversity of literary systems. Gerrit Olivier notes, "While it is not unusual to hear academics and politicians talk about a 'South African literature', the situation at ground level is characterised by diversity and even fragmentation". Robert Mossman adds that "One of the enduring and saddest legacies of the apartheid system may be that no one – White, Black, Coloured (meaning of mixed-race in South Africa), or Asian – can ever speak as a 'South African'". The problem, however, pre-dates apartheid significantly, as South Africa is a country made up of communities that have always been linguistically and culturally diverse. These cultures have all retained some autonomy, making a compilation such as the controversial Southern African Literatures by Michael Chapman difficult. Chapman raises the question:

[W]hose language, culture, or story can be said to have authority in South Africa when the end of apartheid has raised challenging questions as to what it is to be a South African, what it is to live in, whether South Africa is mlg, and, if so, what its mythos is, what requires to be forgotten and what remembered as we scour the past in order to understand the present and seek a path forward into an unknown future.

South Africa has 11 national languages: Afrikaans, English, Zulu, Xhosa, Sotho, Pedi, Tswana, Venda, SiSwati, Tsonga, and Ndebele. Any definitive literary history of South Africa should, it could be argued, discuss literature produced in all 11 languages. But the only literature ever to adopt characteristics that can be said to be "national" is Afrikaans. Olivier argues: "Of all the literatures in South Africa, Afrikaans literature has been the only one to have become a national literature in the sense that it developed a clear image of itself as a separate entity, and that by way of institutional entrenchment through teaching, distribution, a review culture, journals, etc. it could ensure the continuation of that concept." Part of the problem is that English literature has been seen within the greater context of English writing in the world, and has, because of English's global position as ', not been seen as autonomous or indigenous to South Africa – in Olivier’s words: "English literature in South Africa continues to be a sort of extension of British or international English literature." The African languages, on the other hand, are spoken across the borders of Southern Africa - for example, Tswana is spoken in Botswana, Zimbabwe, and Lesotho. South Africa's borders were drawn by the British Empire and, as with all other colonies, were drawn without regard for the people living within them. Therefore, in the history of South African literature, should we include all Tswana writers, or only those with South African citizenship? Chapman bypasses this problem by including "Southern" African literatures.

The second problem with African languages is accessibility: because they are regional languages, none can claim a national readership comparable to Afrikaans and English. Sotho, for instance, while transgressing the national borders of the RSA, is, on the other hand, mainly spoken in the Free State and bears a strong relationship to the language of, for example, Zulu. Thus, the language cannot claim a national readership while, on the other hand, being "international" in the sense that it transcends national borders.

Olivier argues that "There is no obvious reason why it should be unhealthy or abnormal for different literatures to co-exist in one country, each possessing its own infrastructure and allowing theoreticians to develop impressive theories about polysystems". Yet political idealism proposing a unified "South Africa" (a remnant of the colonial British approach) has seeped into literary discourse and demands a unified national literature, which does not exist and has to be fabricated. It is unrealistic to ever think of South Africa and South African literature as homogeneous, now or in the near or distant future, since the only reason it is a country at all is the interference of European colonial powers. This is not a racial issue but rather concerns culture, heritage, and tradition (and, indeed, the constitution celebrates diversity). Instead, it seems more sensible to discuss South African literature as literature produced within the national borders by the different cultures and language groups inhabiting these borders. Otherwise, the danger is of emphasising one literary system at the expense of another, and, more often than not, the beneficiary is English, with African languages being ignored. The distinction between "black" and "white" literature is a remnant of colonialism that should be replaced by drawing distinctions between literary systems based on language affiliation rather than race.

== Pre Colonial Khoisan Literature of South Africa ==
Pre-colonial Khoisan "literature" primarily existed as oral traditions, including narratives, myths, and stories, which were later transcribed and published by missionaries and scholars like Wilhelm Bleek in the 19th century, such as Reynard the Fox in South Africa. These oral accounts, passed down through generations, formed the basis of Khoisan culture and knowledge, with some examples, such as the story of the sisters and the Mantis, providing cultural and social explanations.

The most significant form of pre-colonial Khoisan literary tradition was the spoken word. This included fables, which often conveyed moral lessons and explained the world around them.

Stories about the Mantis and other mythical figures served to explain the origins of customs, traditions, and the natural world.

Knowledge was passed down orally across generations, with names of geographical features, such as the Camissa River, reflecting the deep connection between the people and their environment.

The earliest surviving written accounts date to the 19th and early 20th centuries, when colonial-era figures such as Bleek collected these oral traditions. These collected works were often subject to colonial biases, which shaped how indigenous narratives were presented and understood.

Bleek's 1864 collection of Khoi narratives is considered the first published collection of indigenous South African literature.

Later researchers, such as Leonhard Schultze, collected tales that contrast with Bleek's work, revealing the extent of censorship and transformation that occurred during the colonial period.

== Afrikaans ==
Afrikaans is a Germanic language closely related to Dutch. It has its origins in the 17th century but was officially recognised only in 1875, when the Genootskap van Regte Afrikaners was established. Afrikaans is spoken throughout South Africa, and is the mother tongue of both whites and coloureds (in the South African sense, meaning a specific independent culture rather than the disparaging European or American use of the term). The literary history is thus short, but surprisingly vibrant. The significant literary histories are H. P. Van Coller's Perspektief en Profiel, J. C. Kannemeyer's Geskiedenis van die Afrikaanse literatuur, and Dekker's Afrikaanse Literatuurgeskiedenis. Lewis Nkosi (cf. Cullhed, 2006: 18) claims that "in South Africa there exists an unhealed—I will not say incurable—split between black and white writing". This split occurs because, Nkosi claims, black writers are "largely impervious for the most part to cultural movements which have exercised great influence in the development of white writing". The Afrikaans literary system, in contrast to the African languages, engages with European artistic movements such as Symbolism, expressionism, modernism, post-modernism, Dadaism and the like, offering literature familiar to a European or American audience.

=== Poetry ===
Some of the early names include Leipoldt and Langenhoven, who wrote the national anthem ("Die Stem"). Early poetry often addressed the Anglo-Boer War, and it is only in the 1930s that poetry attains a significant literary standard. N. P. van Wyk Louw is the vanguard of the new movement, called Dertigers, along with his brother WEG Louw, and Elisabeth Eybers, although they were all to write in future literary periods. Olivier notes Van Wyk Louw's predominance: "It was only in the Thirties that a fully developed theory about Afrikaans as a national literature was launched by the erudite poet, N. P. van Wyk Louw, in his two collections of essays Lojale verset (1939) and Berigte te velde (1939)". Van Wyk Louw introduced international literary theories and movements into the South African literary scene on a much larger scale than any of his predecessors, and his "theory provided the intellectual and philosophical space within which poets and novelists could exercise their craft without fear of transgression; in short, it became the paradigm for Afrikaans literature" (Olivier). D. J. Opperman started writing in the 1940s and was to have a particularly prominent role with his anthology, Groot Verseboek.

The next major paradigm shift came in the 1960s, with T. T. Cloete and Ingrid Jonker, who, after her death, attained cult status. Cloete et al. discuss this literary watershed in Rondom Sestig. Cloete is further noteworthy for his compilation, Literêre Terme en Teorieë (1992), which is one of the most encompassing works on literary theory available on the global market, although written in Afrikaans. Some modern poets of note include Joan Hambidge, Hennie Aucamp, Ernst van Heerden, Antjie Krog and Gert Vlok Nel. Breyten Breytenbach is regarded by many as one of the best, if not the best, Afrikaans poets. He spent many years in prison for his political beliefs during apartheid and later lived in France. Breytenbach's latest work, "Die windvanger", was published in 2007. The major poetry anthologies are DJ Opperman's Groot Verseboek, Foster and Viljoen's Poskaarte, Gerrit Komrij's controversial Die Afrikaanse poësie in 1000 en enkele gedigte, and André P. Brink's Groot Verseboek, a remake or reworking of Opperman's anthology.

=== Prose ===
As a predominantly agricultural society, South Africa has produced a prominent body of plaasroman (farm novels) in both early and later periods. One of the archetypes is C. M. van den Heever's Laat Vrugte, which laid the foundations for parodies in the 1960s and later, such as Etienne Leroux's Sewe dae by die Silbersteins, André P. Brink's Houd-den-bek and Eben Venter's Ek stamel ek sterwe. Another example is Marie Linde's novel Onder bevoorregte mense, published in 1925 and also issued in English as Among Privileged People. Even some English novels, such as J. M. Coetzee's Disgrace, remind one of the plaasroman. As urbanisation became more prominent during the time of the two World Wars, other forms emerged, notably the dorpsroman (town novel) such as Lettie Viljoen's Karolina Ferreira, Etienne van Heerden's Die Swye van Mario Salviati, or Alexander Strachan's Die Werfbobbejaan.

Afrikaans writing tends to be critical of conservative culture, and during the Apartheid regime, critical of politics as well. André P. Brink and Etienne Leroux deserve special mention, Brink not only because he is accessible to English readers (he writes in English and Afrikaans, e.g. Duiwelskloof is available as Devil's Valley), but also because the vast oeuvre he produced (prose and drama) sets him apart as arguably the greatest South African writer. Leroux produced less, but had a profound influence on the literary scene. His characters are often outsiders, and his satirical view of South African issues embodies alchemical, Jungian, and Cabbalistic theories and philosophies, with the novel reading like a palimpsest with multiple layers of meaning. This style had a profound influence on writers such as Ingrid Winterbach (Lettie Viljoen), Alexander Strachan, and Etienne van Heerden's magical realist novels.

With the war in Angola, grensliteratuur (border literature) started playing an important role, such as Dine van Zyl's Slagoffers, Christiaan Bakkes's Skuilplek and Alexander Strachan's 'n Wêreld sonder grense. Following the political changes of 1994, an emphasis on the past has become an essential feature of South Africans' attempts to make sense of their past, exemplified by Dan Sleigh's Eilande and André P. Brink's Duiwelskloof. Triomf by Marlene van Niekerk deals with poor Afrikaners in a legendary suburb of Johannesburg, where the Apartheid regime demolished the old black township Sophiatown, to build houses for the white lower-class. Triomf has been translated into English by Leon de Kock.

Another writer who often regresses to earlier times is André P. Brink, e.g., Anderkant die Stilte (in English available as The Other Side of Silence), which is set during the German occupation of Namibia. André Brink was the first Afrikaner writer to be banned by the government after he released the novel A Dry White Season about a white South African who discovers the truth about a black friend who dies in police custody. In recent years, gay and lesbian writing has also begun to feature, for example, Johann de Lange and Eben Venter's Ek stamel ek sterwe. Political turmoil and the opening of South Africa's borders after the 1994 elections have led many writers to move abroad or to write about their time overseas, e.g., Jaco Fouché's Ryk van die Rawe. Other contemporary issues include crime (Jaco Fouché's Die avonture van Pieter Francken, Etienne van Heerden's In stede van die liefde, and others) and government corruption. In short, Afrikaans prose tends to be critical of the dominant ideologies and the government of the time, the society inhabiting this space, and the people living within this society. From a European perspective, Afrikaans prose produces works of a high standard and is artistically and intellectually capable of engaging with the best European and American writers.

== English literature ==
=== Prose ===
One of the first literary works of note is Olive Schreiner's 1883 The Story of an African Farm, which can be linked to Van den Heever's Laat Vrugte as a plaasroman. The novel was a revelation in Victorian literature; many consider it to have introduced feminism into the novel form. However, Mossman (1990: 41) argues that "The most frequently taught work of South African literature in American classrooms is Cry, the Beloved Country (1948) by Alan Paton". A possible reason for this is that it was made into a film starring James Earl Jones, and it depicts a typical racist situation that fits well with American perceptions of South African society. Paton also produced Too Late the Phalarope, another text criticising Apartheid politics, in particular the Immorality Act that forbade interracial sexual relations. During the 1950s, Drum became a hotbed of political satire, fiction, and essays, giving a voice to urban black culture. Around the same time, future Nobel laureate Nadine Gordimer began publishing her first stories. Her most famous novel, July's People, was published in 1981 and depicts the collapse of white-minority rule. Athol Fugard's Tsotsi was also made into a film, although Fugard is usually better known for his dramas. Several influential black poets emerged in the 1970s, such as Mongane Wally Serote, whose most famous work, No Baby Must Weep, offered insight into the everyday lives of black South Africans under Apartheid. Lewis Nkosi, essentially an essayist, transitioned to novel writing and published three novels: Mating Birds (1986), Underground People (2002), and Mandela's Ego (2006). Another famous black novelist, Zakes Mda, transitioned from poetry and plays to prose. His novel The Heart of Redness won the 2001 Commonwealth Writers Prize and was included in the school curriculum across South Africa. Miriam Tlali was the first black woman to publish a novel in South Africa with Muriel at Metropolitan (1975) (also known as Between Two Worlds). John Maxwell (J. M.) Coetzee was also first published in the 1970s. He became internationally recognised in 1983 with his Booker Prize-winning novel Life & Times of Michael K. His 1999 novel Disgrace won him his second Booker Prize as well as the 2000 Commonwealth Writers' Prize. He is also the recipient of the Nobel Prize for Literature in 2003. South African English writing has produced two Nobel Prize winners: Nadine Gordimer and J. M. Coetzee.

Other prominent texts include Mine Boy by Peter Abrahams, Alex La Guma's Walk in the Night, Breyten Breytenbach's The True Confessions of an Albino Terrorist, Marlene van Niekerk's Triomf, Nadine Gordimer's Burger's Daughter, André Brink's Dry White Season, Richard Rive's Buckingham Palace, District Six, André Brink's Rumours of Rain, Nadine Gordimer's July's People, Sipho Sepamla's Ride on the Whirlwind, and Mongane Serote's To every birth its blood. David Lambkin also deserves mentioning, The Hanging Tree reading like a Leroux novel with various Jungian and alchemistic substrates. Talent Dladla Besides sex, What else? By Sheyn Voetseeg

=== Drama ===
Athol Fugard's Master Harold and the Boys is a drama about race relations, and Boesman and Lena depicts the hardships suffered by South Africa's poor. Athol Fugard's plays have been regularly premiered in fringe theatres in South Africa, London (The Royal Court Theatre) and New York. Another noteworthy drama is Zakes Mda's We shall sing for the fatherland.

Recent plays have addressed the high levels of violent crime, including Lara Foot Newton's Tshepang, Athol Fugard's Victory, and Mpumelelo Paul Grootboom's Relativity.

=== Poetry ===
Tony Ullyatt's The Lonely Art: An Anthology includes South African English poetry. English poetry in South Africa is often considered "good" by whether it criticises Apartheid or depicts life "as it is", rather than the Afrikaans emphasis on literary merit, which derives from Russian Formalism and was introduced by Van Wyk Louw.

Professor Chris Mann is a poet presently associated with Rhodes University and has compiled several anthologies of poetry.

== African languages ==
Although there are nine official African languages in South Africa, most speakers are fluent in Afrikaans and English. Coupled with the small market for writing in African languages, this has led many African writers to write in English and Afrikaans. Missionaries often inspired the first texts produced by black authors, which frequently addressed African history, particularly the history of kings such as King Shaka kaSenzangakhona. Modern South African writing in African languages tends to engage in realistic representation, to provide a mirror to society, and to depict conflicts between rural and urban settings, between traditional and modern norms, racial conflicts, and, most recently, the problem of AIDS.

In the first half of the 20th century, epics largely dominated black male writing: historical novels, such as Sol T. Plaatje's Mhudi: An Epic of South African Native Life a Hundred Years Ago (1930), Thomas Mofolo's Chaka (trans. 1925), and epic plays including those of H. I. E. Dhlomo, or heroic epic poetry such as the work of Mazisi Kunene. These texts "evince black African patriarchy in its traditional form, with men in authority, often as warriors or kings, and women as background figures of dependency, and/or mothers of the nation" (Cullhed, 2006: 21). Female literature in the African languages is severely limited because of the strong influence of patriarchy. Still, over the last decade or two, society has changed much, and it can be expected that more female voices will emerge.

=== Zulu ===
Some of the most prominent Zulu authors are BW Vilakazi, Mazisi Kunene, RRR Dhlomo, HIE Dhlomo, JL Dube, Njabulo Ndebele, Talent Dladla,Nimrod Ndebele, EA Made, and DBZ Ntuli.

=== Xhosa ===
Ityala lamawele (The Lawsuit of the Twins) by S. E. K. Mqhayi is the first extant novel in the Xhosa language. It was published in 1914 by the Lovedale Press, and has been a significant influence on subsequent isiXhosa literature.

Other prominent Xhosa authors are AC Jordan, JJR Jolobe, ZS Qangule, KS Bongela, Godfrey Mzamane, Rubusana, Peter Mtuze and Guybon Sinxo. A notable female writer is Sindiwe Magona. Her 1998 novel, Mother to Mother, deals with violence at the end of apartheid through the killing of an American student Amy Biehl. Magona writes both in English and Xhosa.

=== Sesotho ===
Some of the most prominent Sesotho authors are MKPD Maphala, BM Khaketla, N.S. Puleng, Thomas Mofolo, and Makali Isabella Mokitimi.

=== Pedi ===
Some of the most prominent Pedi authors are OK Matsepe, HDN Bopape, HP Maredi, SR Machaka, MS Nchabeleng,Ramaila and Itumeleng Lebese.

=== Tswana ===
Some of the most prominent Tswana authors are Sol Plaatje, DB Moloto, DPS Monyaise, SA Moroke, Gilbert Modise, MJ Ntsime, Leetile Disang Raditladi (who had a crater on Mercury named after him), MD Mothoagae, JHK Molao.

== Literary festivals ==
The Franschhoek Literary Festival was launched in 2007 and has been taking place once a year since then. Its focus is on English-speaking South African literature that includes fiction, non-fiction, and poetry. Every year, a few distinguished international authors are also invited. The Knysna Literary Festival first took place in 2009 with similar objectives. In contrast, the Open Book Festival in Cape Town wants to be international with authors and audience from around the world. It also sees itself as a place where South African writers can promote themselves. The Open Book Festival was first launched in 2011. All three festivals also aim to draw children and young adults into reading by organizing special events for these audiences and funding projects such as school libraries.

== See also ==
- Siswati literature
- Zulu literature
- Xhosa literature
- List of South African writers
- List of South African poets
- South African poetry
- List of literary awards, South African section
- Media of South Africa
