= South African Literary Awards =

Annual prizes given to South African writers

- Awarded for: Literary excellence
- Country: South Africa
- Reward: R30 000
- First award: 2005; 21 years ago
- Website: sala.org.za

The South African Literary Awards (SALA) have been awarded annually since 2005 to exceptional South African writers. Founded by the wRiteassociates, in partnership with the national Department of Arts and Culture (DAC), the awards "pay tribute to South African writers who have distinguished themselves as ground-breaking producers and creators of literature" and celebrate "literary excellence in the depiction and sharing of South Africa's histories, value systems, philosophies and art". The Awards are open to work in all of South Africa's eleven official languages, and they may include posthumous honours.

Since 2005, the number of awards has multiplied — there are now fourteen categories, recognising a variety of literary forms. There are categories for children's literature, youth literature, literary journalism, novels, poetry, creative non-fiction, debut works, and literary translation; and two named awards, the K. Sello Duiker Memorial Award (for novelists under the age of 40) and the Nadine Gordimer Short Story Award. Lifetime achievement is recognised in the Poet Laureate Prizes and the Lifetime Achievement, Posthumous, and Chairperson's Awards.

SALA was founded by the wRite associates in partnership with the South African Department of Arts and Culture. Since 2012, the awards have been given at the annual Africa Century International Writers Conference. The inaugural conference was hosted by the University of the Free State in 2012, supported by the SABC. As of 2021, the winner in each category received R30 000, and the National Poet Laureate received R100 000.

== Poet Laureate Prizes ==
=== National Poet Laureate Prize ===
- Mazisi Kunene (2005–2006)
- Keorapetse Kgositsile (2006–2018)
- Mongane Wally Serote (2018–present)

=== Regional Poets Laureate Prize ===
- Ronelda Kamfer, Afrikaans (2021)
- Themba Patrick Magaisa, Tsonga (2021)

The Regional Poet Laureate Prize was awarded for the first time in 2021. The prize is intended to guide the selection of future National Poet Laureates.

== K. Sello Duiker Memorial Award ==
The K. Sello Duiker Memorial Award, named for the South African novelist K. Sello Duiker, recognises novels and novellas by authors under the age of 40. The age limitation was not in place in the award's early years.

K. Sello Duiker Award Winners
Year	Winner	Work	Language	Ref.
2024	Sihle Qwabe	The Resurrection	English	
2023	Dimakatso David Mokwena	Here Comes the Gay King	English	
2022	Nick Mulgrew	A Hibiscus Coast	English	
2022	Mzoli Mavimbela	Amazwembezwembe KaGxuluwe	Xhosa	
2021	Karen Jennings	An Island	English	
2021	Lihle Sokapase	Yapatyalaka ibhobhile	Xhosa	
2020	Phumlani Pikoli	Born Free-Loaders	English	
2019	Chase Rhys	Kinnes	Afrikaans	
2018	No award			
2017	Nthikeng Mohlele	Pleasure	English	
2016	Willem Anker	Buys	Afrikaans	
2016	Panashe Chigumadzi	Sweet Medicine	English	
2015	Zukiswa Wanner	London Cape Town Joburg	English	
2014	Jamala Safari	The Great Agony and Pure Laughter of the Gods	English	
2013	Karen Jayes	For the Mercy of Water	English	
2012	Sonja Loots	Sirkusboere	Afrikaans	
2012	Diale Tlholwe	Counting the Coffins	English	
2012	Nhlanhla Maake	Manong a lapile	Southern Sotho	
2011	Dan Sleigh	Afstande	Afrikaans	
2011	E. D. M. Sibiya	Ngiyolibala Ngifile	Zulu	
2010	Motlatlhego Victor Molele	Mmaphefo le Maphefo	Sepedi	
2010	Kgebetli Moele	The Book of the Dead	English	
2009	Chris Marnewick	Shepherds and Butchers	English	
2009	H. R. Tshianane	Vhuanzwo	Venda	
2009	Kabelo D. Kgatea	Monwana wa Bosupa	Tswana	
2009	Siphatheleni Kula	Inkawu idliw’ ilila	Xhosa	
2008	Njabulo Ndebele	Fine Lines from the Box: Further Thoughts about Our Country	English	
2007	Bruce Mikhomazi Ngobeni	Body of work	Tsonga	

== Nadine Gordimer Short Story Award ==
The Nadine Gordimer Short Story Award, named for the South African novelist and short story writer Nadine Gordimer, recognises short story collections by a single author.

Nadine Gordimer Award Winners
Year	Winner	Work	Language	Ref.
2024	Dawn Garisch	What Remains	English	
2023	Terry-Ann Adams	White Chalk	English	
2022	Mzoli Mavimbela	Zigqitywa Kuhlwile Zibonwe Liwuhlabile	Xhosa	
2022	S. J. Naudé	Mad Honey	English	
2021	Nankanjani Sibiya	The Reluctant Storyteller: A Collection of Stories	English	
2021	Madoda Ndlakuse	Mhla Latsh’ibhayi	Xhosa	
2020	Fred Khumalo	Talk of The Town	English	
2019	Niq Mhlongo	Soweto, Under the Apricot Tree	English	
2018	Nick Mulgrew	The First Law of Sadness	English	
2018	Nicole Jaekel Strauss	As in die mond	Afrikaans	
2017	Roela Hattingh	Kamee	Afrikaans	
2016	Sandra Hill	Unsettled and Other Stories	English	
2015	Abraham H. de Vries	Maar wie snoei die rose in die nag?	Afrikaans	
2014	Makhosazana Xaba	Running and Other Stories	English	
2014	Reneilwe Malatji	Love, Interrupted	English	
2013	Etienne van Heerden	Haai Karoo	Afrikaans	
2012	No award			
2011	No award			
2010	Mary Misaveni Mabuza	Khuluka na Ritavi	Tsonga	
2010	BIshop M. T. Makobe	Nkune se, Mphe se!	Sepedi	
2009	J.J. Ncongwane	Tikhatsi Letimatima	Swati	
2008	No award			
2007	Otty E.H.M Nxumalo	Body of work	Zulu	

== Novel Award ==
Novel Award Winners
Year	Winner	Work	Language	Ref.
2024	Barry Gilder	At Fire Hour	English	
2024	Jabulane Johan Ncongwane	Lifa Letilima		
2024	Sithembile Mputa	Unyana Wolahleko		
2024	S. J. Naudé	Van vaders en vlugtelinge	Afrikaans	
2024	Kabelo Duncan Kgatea	Tsamaya sentle 'tata' Mandela		
2023	Thivhusiwi Tshindane Tshivhula	Hone Hu Tshi Tea U Maliwa Ngavhugai		
2022	Damon Galgut	The Promise	English	
2022	Ingrid Winterbach	Voorouer. Pelgrim. Berg	Afrikaans	
2022	Yamkela Ntwalanao	Intlungu Yevezandlebe	Xhosa	
2022	Patrick Khosa	Nhlokonho wa vele	Xitsonga	
2021	Ezra Mcebisi Nkohla	Zajik 'izinto	Xhosa	
2021	Fred Khumalo	Ngenxa yemendi	Xhosa	
2020	Fiona Snyckers	Lacuna	English	
2019	Charl-Pierre Naudé	Die ongelooflike onskuld van Dirkie Verwey	Afrikaans	
2019	Sabata-Mpho Mokae	Moletlo wa Manong	Setswana	
2018	Dan Sleigh	1795	Afrikaans	

== Creative Non-Fiction Award ==
Creative Non-Fiction Award Winners (2012–2021)
Year	Winner	Work	Language	Ref.
2023	Mandla J. Radebe	The Lost Prince of the ANC: The Life and Times of Jabulani Nobleman 'Mzala' Nxumalo	English	
2022	Ebrahim Harvey	The Great Pretenders: Race and Class Under ANC Rule	English	
2022	Nicol Stassen	Van Humpata tot Upingtonia	Afrikaans	
2021	Mzoli Mavimbela	Masibuyel’embo Konakele Phi Na?	Xhosa	
2021	Sabata-Mpho Mokae Brian Willan	Sol Plaatje: A Life in Letters	English	
2020	Toni Strasburg	Holding the Fort	English	
2019	Jonathan Jansen	As by Fire: The End of the South African University	English	
2018	Jürgen Schadenberg	The Way I See It	English	
2017	Dikgang Moseneke	My Own Liberator	English	
2016	Jacob Dlamini	Askari: A Story of Collaboration and Betrayal in the Anti-Apartheid Struggle	English	
2015	Edwin Cameron	Justice: A Personal Account	English	
2014	Sihle Khumalo	Almost Sleeping My Way to Timbuktu	English	
2013	Imraan Coovadia	Transformations: Essays	English	
2012	McIntosh Polela	My Father My Monster	English	
2012	Hannes Haasbroek	'n Seun soos Bram	Afrikaans	

== First-Time Published Author Award ==
The First-Time Published Author Award is open to works of all genres whose authors who have not been published before in any genre.

First-Time Author Award Winners (2009–2021)
Year	Winner	Work	Language	Ref.
2021	Reŝoketŝwe Manenzhe	Scatterlings	English	
2021	Lynthia Julius	Uit die kroes	Afrikaans	
2020	Trevor Sacks	Lucky Packet	English	
2020	Lize Albertyn-du Toit	Die kinders van spookwerwe	Afrikaans	
2019	Bongani Ngqulunga	The Man Who Founded the ANC: A Biography of Pixley Ka Isaka Seme	English	
2018	Malebo Sephodi	Miss Behave	English	
2017	Moses Seletiša	Tšhutšhumakgala	Sepedi	
2016	Francois Smith	Kamphoer	Afrikaans	
2015	Carol Campbell	My Children Have Faces	English	
2014	Claire Robertson	The Spiral House	English	
2013	Ashraf Kagee	Khalil’s Journey	English	
2012	Yewande Omotoso	Bom Boy	English	
2012	S. J. Naudé	Alfabet van die voëls	Afrikaans	
2011	Sifiso Mzobe	Young Blood	English	
2010	Alistair Morgan	Sleeper’s Wake	English	
2009	Diale Tlholwe	Ancient Rites	English	

== Poetry Award ==
Poetry Award Winners (2009-2021)
Year	Winner	Work	Language	Ref.
2024	Fhulufhelo Ntsieni	Rudzani		
2024	Sithembele Isaac Xhegwana	Dark lines of history: poems		
2021	Johann de Lange	Die meeste sterre is lankal dood	Afrikaans	
2021	Ayanda Billie	KwaNobuhle Overcast	English	
2021	Babalwa Fatyi	Hlahl’indlela Nohombile	Xhosa	
2021	Kgwadi Kgwadi	Ithuteng Mogolokwane	Tswana	
2021	Nndanduleni Mulaudzi	Khonadzeo	Venda	
2021	Tshepiso Makgoloane	Tša maAfrika	Sepedi	
2020	Marlise Joubert	Grondwater	Afrikaans	
2020	Musawenkosi Khanyile	All the Places	English	
2019	Tony Ullyattfor	An Unobtrusive Vice	English	
2019	Nathan Trantraal	Alles het niet kom wôd	Afrikaans	
2019	Ayanda Billie	Umhlaba umanzi	Xhosa	
2018	Kelwyn Sole	Walking, Falling	English	
2017	Simphiwe Ali Nolutshungu	Iingcango Zentliziyo	Xhosa	
2017	Helen Moffett	Prunings	English	
2016	Gilbert Gibson	Vry	Afrikaans	
2016	Arja Salafranca	Beyond Touch	English	
2015	Charl-Pierre Naude	Al die lieflike dade	Afrikaans	
2015	Mangaliso Buzani	Ndisabhala Imibongo	Xhosa	
2015	Bishop M. T. Makobe	Tsa Ngweding wa Letopanta	Sepedi	
2014	Thandi Sliepen	The Turtle Dove Told Me	English	
2014	Themba Patrick Magaisa	Mihloti ya Tingana	Tsonga	
2013	Petra Muller	Om die gedagte van geel	Afrikaans	
2012	Ingrid de Kok	Other Signs	English	
2012	Johann Lodewyk Marais	Diorama	Afrikaans	
2011	Phillippa Yaa de Villiers	The Everyday Wife	English	
2010	BIshop M. T. Makobe	Kekeretsane tsa bokgwalwe/Hlaa tsa tokologo	Sepedi	
2010	Danie Marais	Al is die maan ‘n misverstand	Afrikaans	
2010	Kobus Moolman	Separating the Seas	English	
2009	Loftus Marais	Staan in die algemeen nader aan vensters	Afrikaans	
2009	Mxolisi Nyezwa	New Country	English	

== Children's Literature Award ==
The Children's Literature Award recognises works of fiction for children by adult authors.

Children's Literature Award Winners (2018–2020)
Year	Winner	Work	Language	Ref.
2021	Andre Trantaal	Keegan & Samier: die sokkerfiasko	Afrikaans	
2020	Niki Daly	It's Jamela!	English	
2019	Lebohang Masango	Mpumi's Magic Beads	English	
2018	Jaco Jacobs	Daar's nie 'n krokodil in hierdie boek nie Moenie hierdie boek eet nie	Afrikaans	
2018	Marilyn Honikman	There Should Have Been Five	English	

== Youth Literature Award ==
The Youth Literature Award recognises works of fiction written for readers aged 12 to 18.

Youth Literature Award Winners (2019–2021)
Year	Winner	Work	Language	Ref.
2021	Pamela Newham	The Boy and the Poacher’s Moon	English	
2021	Kobate John Sekele	Mararankodi mafelelo	Sepedi	
2021	Sipho R. Kekezwa	Ubomi, ungancama!	Xhosa	
2020	Trevor Noah	Born A Crime: Young Readers Edition	English	
2019	Sally Partridge	Mine	English	

== Literary Journalism Award ==
The Literary Journalism Award recognises those who, through print or electronic media, "have made a significant contribution to the promotion and development of South African literature through writing, commentating, advocating and critiquing." As of 2007, it was sponsored by the Sowetan and the SABC.

Journalism Award Winners (2009-2021)
Year	Winner	Language	Ref.
2021	Jean Meiring	Afrikaans	
2020	Bongani Mavuso	Zulu	
2019	Jennifer Malec	English	
2019	Wamuwi Mbao	English	
2018	Sam Mathe	English	
2017	Don Makatile	English	
2017	Phakama Mbonamb	English	
2016	No award		
2015	Michele Magwood	English	
2014	No award		
2013	No award		
2012	Jenny Crwys-Williams	English	
2011	Sabata-Mpho Mokae	English	
2010	Kevin Bloom	English	
2009	Karabo Kgoleng	English	
2009	Maureen Isaacson	English	
2008	No award		
2007	Victor Dlamini	English	
2007	Bongani Madondo	English	

== Literary Translators Award ==
The Literary Translators Award is open to South African literary works, or literary works translated by a South African, of any genre. It was awarded for the first time in 2008.

Literary Translators Award Winners (2009–2021)
Year	Winner	Work	Language	Ref.
2021	Jeff Opland and Peter T. Mtuze	Iimbali Zamandulo (1838–1910)	Xhosa to English	
2020	Refiloe Moahluli	YHEKE YANGA! Umdlali ka3 Toti uba yintshatsheli yeqakamba	English to Xhosa	
2019	Michiel Heyns	Red Dog (Buys by Willem Anker)	Afrikaans to English	
2018	Peter T. Mtuze and Jeff Opland	Umoya Wembongi: Collected Poems 1922–1935 (by John Solilo) Iziganeko Zesizwe: Occasional Poems 1900–1943 (by S. E. K. Mqhay)	Xhosa to English	
2017	Bridget Theron-Bushell	The Thirstland Trek: 1874–1881 (by Nicol Stassen)	Afrikaans to English	
2017	Jeff Opland, Wandile Kuse and Pamela Maseko	Isizwe Esinembali: Xhosa Histories and Poetry 1873–1888 (by William Wellington Gqoba)	Xhosa to English	
2017	Jeff Opland and Pamela Maseko	Iimbali Zamanyange, Historical Poems (by D. L. P. Yali-Manisi)	Xhosa to English	
2016	Leon de Kock and Karin Schimke	Flame in the Snow: The Love Letters of André Brink and Ingrid Jonker (by André Brink and Ingrid Jonker)	Afrikaans to English	
2015	Karen Press	Synapse (Mede-wete by Antjie Krog)	Afrikaans to English	
2014	Nhlanhla Maake	Malefane	Sesotho to English	
2013	Nhlanhla Maake	Letter to My Sister (Mangolo a nnake)	Sesotho to English	
2012	Francois Smith	David Kramer: ‘n biografie (by Dawid de Villiers and Mathilda Slabbert)	English to Afrikaans	
2011	Leon de Kock	Intimately Absent (Intieme afwesige by Cas Vos)	Afrikaans to English	
2010	No award			
2009	Dirk Winterbach and Ingrid Winterbach	The Book of Happenstance (Die boek van toeval en toeverlaat by Ingrid Winterbach)	Afrikaans to English	
2008	Chris van Wyk	A Place Called Vatmaar (Vatmaar by A. H. M. Scholtz)	Afrikaans to English	

== Posthumous Literary Award ==
The Posthumous Literary Award is awarded on the basis of an author's "overall literary achievement."

Posthumous Award Winners (2006–2021)
Year	Winner	Language	Ref.
2023	Seetsele Modiri Molema , Solomon Tshekisho Plaatje – Morata Baabo		
2022	Gisela Ullyatt, Die waarheid oor duiwe	Afrikaans	
2021	No award		
2020	Makhokolotso Albertina Mokhomo	Sesotho	
2019	Cyril Lincoln Sibusiso Nyembezi	Zulu	
2018	Leon Roussow	Afrikaans	
2018	S.M. Mofokeng	Sotho	
2017	|A!kunta, !Kabbo, ≠Kasin, Dia!kwain and |Han≠kass’o	ǀXam, !Xun	
2016	T. T. Cloete	Afrikaans	
2016	Chris van Wyk	English	
2015	R. R. R. Dhlomo	English, Zulu	
2015	H. I. E. Dhlomo	English	
2014	Mbulelo Vizikhungo Mzamane	English	
2013	No award		
2012	No award		
2011	Jan Rabie	Afrikaans	
2010	Elizabeth Eybers	Afrikaans	
2010	Stephen Bantu Biko	English	
2009	Sol Plaatje	English	
2009	Etienne Leroux	Afrikaans	
2009	W.K. Tamsanqa	Xhosa	
2008	Dora Taylor	English	
2008	A. H. M. Scholtz	Afrikaans	
2008	Sheila Cussons	Afrikaans	
2007	Dalene Matthee	Afrikaans	
2007	Sipho Sepamla	English	
2007	Phaswane Mpe	English	
2006	James Moiloa	Sotho	
2006	Bessie Head	English	
2006	Ingoapele Madingoane	English	

== Chairperson's Literary Award ==
The Chairperson's Literary Award is awarded at the discretion of the Chairperson of the SALA Advisory Board.

Chairperson's Award Winners (2010–2021)
Year	Winner	Language	Ref.
2023	Elinor Sisulu		
2022	Nokuthula Mazibuko Msimang		
2022	Deela Khan		
2022	Lebogang Mashil		
2021	Ntogela Masilela	English	
2020	Recius Melato Malope	Tswana	
2020	Gubudla Aaron Malindzisa	Siswati	
2019	Lindiwe Mabuza	English	
2018	Peter Magubane	English	
2017	Christian Themba Msimang	Zulu	
2016	Gcina Mhlophe	English, Afrikaans, Zulu, Xhosa	
2015	Peter T. Mtuze	English	
2014	Zakes Mda	English	
2013	No award		
2012	B. W. Vilakazi	Zulu	
2011	K. P. D. Maphalla	Sotho	
2011	Nkadimeng Leutsoa	Sotho	
2010	S. E. K. Mqhayi	Xhosa	

== Lifetime Achievement Literary Award ==
The Lifetime Achievement Literary Award is awarded to authors over the age of 60 on the basis of their "overall literary achievement."

Lifetime Achievement Award Winners (2005–2021)
Year	Winner	Language	Ref.
2021	Lefifi Tladi	English	
2020	No award		
2019	Louise Smit	English, Afrikaans	
2019	C. T. D. Marivate	Tsonga	
2018	Hermann Giliomee	English, Afrikaans	
2018	Ronnie Kasrils	English	
2017	Credo Vusamazulu Mutwa	English	
2017	Aletta Matshediso Motimele	Sepedi	
2017	Etienne van Heerden	Afrikaans	
2016	Ingrid Winterbach	Afrikaans	
2016	Johan Lenake	Southern Sotho	
2015	Antjie Krog	Afrikaans	
2015	Achmat Dangor	English	
2014	Nuruddin Farah	English	
2014	Njabulo Ndebele	English	
2013	P. G. du Plessis	Afrikaans	
2012	Ndivhudzannyi Emelina Sigogo	Venda	
2011	Chris Barnard	Afrikaans	
2010	Mary Misaveni Mabuza	Tsonga	
2010	Hennie Aucamp	Afrikaans	
2010	Mandla Langa	English	
2010	Zakes Mda	English	
2010	Peter Horn	English	
2010	Marguerite Poland	English	
2010	David Robbins	English	
2009	Abraham de Vries	Afrikaans	
2009	Matthew J. Mngadi	Zulu	
2008	D. M. Modise	Sotho	
2008	W. M. R. Sigwavhulimu	Venda	
2008	Elsa Joubert	Afrikaans	
2008	Adam Small	Afrikaans	
2008	Wilma Stockenström	Afrikaans	
2008	Luli Callinicos	English	
2008	Miriam Makeba	Swahili, Xhosa, Sotho	
2008	Patrick Cullinan	English	
2007	Mafika Gwala	English	
2007	Max Makisi Marhanele	English	
2007	Felix Thuketana	Tsonga	
2007	Stephen Gray	English	
2007	Gladys Thomas	English	
2007	Ahmed Essop	English	
2007	Mbuyiseni Mtshali	English	
2007	Athol Fugard	English	
2007	Mongane Serote	English	
2007	Sindiwe Magona	Xhosa	
2006	Ephraim Lesoro	Sotho	
2006	Toek Blignaut	Afrikaans	
2006	D. B. Z. Ntuli	Zulu	
2006	Lauretta Ngcobo	Tsonga	
2006	Ronnie Govender	English	
2006	André Brink	English	
2006	Peter Abrahams	English	
2006	Lewis Nkosi	English	
2006	Don Mattera	English	
2006	Karel Schoeman	Afrikaans	
2005	Es'kia Mphahlele	English	
2005	Noni Jabavu	English	
2005	Ellen Kuzwayo	English	
2005	Nadine Gordimer	English	
2005	Denis Brutus	English	
2005	James Matthews	English	
2005	T. N. Maumela	Venda	
2005	Miriam Tlali	English	
2005	E. S. Madima	Venda	
2005	Modikwe Dikobe	English	
