= Media24 Books Literary Awards =

South African literary prizes awarded annually

- Awarded for: Excellent books published under Media25
- Country: South Africa
- Presented by: Media24
- Formerly called: Via Afrika Awards; Nasboek Literary Awards
- Reward: R2 000 000 000

The Media24 Books Literary Awards (known before 2011 as the Via Afrika Awards, and before that as the Nasboek Literary Awards) are a group of five South African literary prizes awarded annually by Media24, the print-media arm of the South African media company Naspers. They are open to authors whose books are published within the Media24 Books stable (previously known as the Via Afrika stable), which includes NB Publishers, Jonathan Ball Publishers, LuxVerbi-BM, NVA, and Van Schaik Publishers. Each award is worth R35 000. The awards comprise:

- The W.A. Hofmeyr Prize, a long-established prize for Afrikaans literature;
- The Herman Charles Bosman Prize for English literature;
- The Recht Malan Prize for non-fiction;
- The MER Prizes for illustrated children’s books and youth literature;
- The Elisabeth Eybers Prize for poetry.

The Jan Rabie Rapport Prize, for debut works in Afrikaans, was awarded annually at the same awards ceremony as the Media24 prizes from 2004 to 2014, but was open to all South African publishers. The M-Net Literary Awards were also awarded at the same ceremony until 2010.

The 2020 awards were heavily criticised for their lack of diversity. The winners included six white males and one white female, while the 18 judges included of only two people of colour.

== W.A. Hofmeyr Prize ==
The W.A. Hofmeyr Prize is awarded annually for literary excellence in drama, poetry and prose that could "shift the boundaries of Afrikaans literature." It was instituted in 1954 by Nasionale Pers in honour of Afrikaans businessman W.A. Hofmeyr, a former chairman of the company. Originally only books published by Nasionale Boekhandel (NB Publishers) were eligible, but it is now open to all presses within the Media24 stable. As of 2020, the award was worth R35 000.

Winners (1954-2021)
Year	Winner	Work	Shortlisted works	Ref.
2020	Zirk van den Berg	Ek wens, ek wens	Kerneels Breytenbach, Hond se gedagte; Etienne van Heerden, Die biblioteek aan die einde van die wêreld	
2019	Lodewyk G. du Plessis	Die dao van Daan van der Walt	Ingrid Winterbach, Die troebel tyd; Charl-Pierre Naudé, Die ongelooflike onskuld van Dirkie Verwey	
2018	Eben Venter	Groen soos die hemel daarbo	Etienne Van Heerden, Die wêreld van Charlie Oeng; Nicole Jaekel Strauss, As in die mond	
2017	Dan Sleigh	1795	Ryk Hattingh, Huilboek; John Miles, Op ’n dag, ’n hond	
2016	Ingrid Winterbach	Vlakwater	Lien Botha, Wonderboom; Alexander Strachan, Brandwaterkom	
2015	Willem Anker	Buys: 'n grensroman	Kerneels Breytenbach, Ester; Harry Kalmer, 'n Duisend stories oor Johannesburg; Francois Smith, Kamphoer	
2014	Etienne van Heerden	Klimtol	Kerneels Breytenbach and Deon Opperman, Donkerland; Eben Venter, Wolf, wolf	
2013	Ingrid Winterbach	Die aanspraak van lewende wesens	Petra Muller, Om die gedagte van geel; Johann de Lange, Vaarwel, my effens bevlekte held	
2012	Dan Sleigh	Wals met Mathilda	T.T. Cloete, Onversadig; Sonja Loots, Sirkusboere	
2011	Alexander Strachan	Dwaalpoort	Ingrid Winterbach, Die benederyk; Marlene van Niekerk, Die sneeuslaper	
2010	Eben Venter	Santa Gamka	Abraham H. de Vries, Verbeel jou dis somer; Louis Krüger, Wederkoms	
2009	Etienne van Heerden	30 Nagte in Amsterdam	Izak de Vries, Byna liefde; Loftus Marais, Staan in die algemeen nader aan vensters	
2008	Breyten Breytenbach	Die windvanger	Etienne van Heerden, Asbesmiddag; Deon Meyer, Onsigbaar	
2007	Ingrid Winterbach	Die boek van toeval en toeverlaat	Eben Venter, Horrelpoot; Marlene van Niekerk, Memorandum	
2006	Etienne van Heerden	In stede van die liefde		
2005	Marlene van Niekerk	Agaat		
2004	Eben Venter	Begeerte		
2003	Dan Sleigh	Eilande		
2002	Karel Schoeman	Armosyn van die Kaap		
2001	Dine van Zyl	Slagoffers		
2000	Ingrid Winterbach	Buller se plan		
1999	André P. Brink	Duiwelskloof		
1998	George Weideman	Die onderskepper		
1997	Eben Venter	Ek stamel, ek sterwe		
1996	Elsa Joubert	Die reise van Isobelle		
1995	Alexander Strachan	Die werfbobbejaan		
1994	Eben Venter	Foxtrot van die vleiseters		
1993				
1992	Chris Barnard	Moerland		
1991	Sheila Cussons	Die knetterende woord		
1990	T.T. Cloete	Driepas		
1989	Elsa Joubert	Missionaris		
1988	Ernst van Heerden	Amulet teen die vuur		
1987	Etienne van Heerden	Toorberg		
1986	T.T. Cloete	Allotroop		
1985	Karel Schoeman	'n Ander land		
1984	Henriette Grové	Die kêrel van die Pêrel, of Anatomie van ’n leuenaar		
1983	Elisabeth Eybers	Bestand		
1982	Sheila Cussons	Die woedende brood		
1981	T.T. Cloete	Angelliera		
1980	D.J. Opperman	Komas uit ’n bamboesstok		
1979	Elsa Joubert	Die swerfjare van Poppie Nongena		
1978				
1977				
1976	Freda Linde	Die singende gras		
1975	Ernst van Heerden	Teenstrydige liedere		
1974	Chris Barnard	Mahala		
1973	P.G. du Plessis	Siener in die suburbs		
1972	Sheila Cussons	Plektrum		
1971				
1970	P.G. du Plessis	Die nag van Legio		
1969				
1968	M.M. Walters	Cabala		
1967	Linda Joubert	Jaarringe		
1966	D.J. Opperman	Dolosse		
1965	Audrey Blignault	Met ligter tred		
1964				
1963				
1962				
1961				
1960				
1959				
1958				
1957				
1956	D.J. Opperman	Blom en baaierd		
1955	Mikro	Die porseleinkat		
1954	G.H. Franz	Rabodutu		
1954	D.J. Opperman	Periandros van Korinthe		

== Herman Charles Bosman Prize ==
The Herman Charles Bosman Prize, named for South African short-story writer Herman Charles Bosman, recognises excellence in English literary writing, including autobiography, in South Africa.

Winners of the Herman Charles Bosman Prize (1997–2020)
Year	Winner	Work	Shortlisted works	Ref.
2020	Trevor Sacks	Lucky Packet	Finuala Dowling, Okay, Okay, Okay; Ekow Duker, Yellowbone	
2019	Niq Mhlongo	Soweto, Under the Apricot Tree	Cynthia Jele, The Ones with Purpose; Kirsten Miller, The Hum of the Sun	
2018	Ken Barris	The Life of Worm and Other Misconceptions	Michiel Heyns, I am Pandarus; Qarnita Loxton, Being Kari	
2017	No award			
2016	Finuala Dowling	The Fetch	Athol Fugard and Paula Fourie, The Shadow of the Hummingbird	
2015	Michiel Heyns	A Sportful Malice	Chris Karsten, Face-Off; Zakes Mda, Rachel’s Blue	
2014	Novuyo Rosa Tshuma	Shadows	Rachel Zadok, Sister-sister; Margie Orford, Water Music	
2013	Rustum Kozain	Groundwork	Ken Barris, Life Underwater; Chris Wadman, The Unlikely Genius of Dr Cuthbert Kambazuma	
2012	Michiel Heyns	Lost Ground	Margie Orford, Gallows Hill; Finuala Dowling, Homemaking for the Down-at-Heart	
2011	Sifiso Mzobe	Young Blood	Cynthia Jele, Happiness is a Four-Letter Word; Zukiswa Wanner, Men of the South	
2010	Sally-Ann Murray	Small Moving Parts	Yvette Christiansë, Imprendehora; Maya Fowler, The Elephant in the Room	
2009	Michiel Heyns	Bodies Politic	Breyten Breytenbach, Veil of Footsteps: Memoir of a Fictional Nomadic Character; Finuala Dowling, Notes from the Dementia Ward	
2008	No award		Gail Dendy, The Lady Missionary (honourable mention); Niq Mhlongo, After Tears (honourable mention); Brent Meersman, Primary Coloured	
2007	Maxine Case	All We Have Left Unsaid	Ken Barris, What Kind of Child	
2007	Kgebetli Moele	Room 207	Ken Barris, What Kind of Child	
2006	Simão Kikamba	Going Home		
2005	Keorapetse Kgositsile	This Way I Salute You: Selected Poems		
2004	Rayda Jacobs	Confessions of a Gambler		
2003	Ingrid Fiske	Terrestrial Things: Poems		
2002	K. Sello Duiker	The Quiet Violence of Dreams		
2001	Willemien Le Roux	Shadow Bird		
2000	Peter Rudolf Gisela Horn	My Voice is Under Control Now		
1999				
1998	Achmat Dangor	Kafka's Curse: A Novella & Three Other Stories		
1997	Rayda Jacobs	Eyes of the Sky		

== Recht Malan Prize ==
The Recht Malan Prize recognises excellent non-fiction or non-literary books in English or Afrikaans, aiming to promote quality of writing, depth of research, and originality of approach. It was first awarded in 1978.

Winners of the Recht Malan Prize (2003–2020)
Year	Winner	Work	Shortlisted works	Ref.
2020	Jonny Steinberg	One Day in Bethlehem	Adam Habib, Rebels and Rage; Michelle le Roux and Dennis Davis, Lawfare	
2019	Rob Rose	Steinheist	Simone Haysom,The Last Words of Rowan du Preez; Nathan Trantraal, Wit issie ’n colour nie	
2018	Jacques Pauw	The President’s Keepers	Crispian Olver, How to Steal a City; Redi Tlhabi, Khwezi	
2017	Sean Christie	Under Nelson Mandela Boulevard	Daniel Browde, The Relatively Public Life of Jules Browde; Kevin Bloom and Richard Poplak, Continental Shift	
2016	Milton Shain	A Perfect Storm	Gavin Evans, Black Brain, White Brain; Charles van Onselen, Showdown at the Red Lion	
2015	Mark Gevisser	Lost and Found in Johannesburg	Edwin Cameron, Justice; Jonny Steinberg, A Man of Good Hope	
2014	Irina Filatova and Apollon Davidson	The Hidden Thread	Graham Linscott, Into the River of Life; Bill Nasson and Albert Grundlingh, The War at Home / Die oorlog kom huis toe	
2013	Stephen Ellis	The External Mission	Xolela Mangcu, Biko: A Biography; Beverley Naidoo, Death of an Idealist	
2012	Anton Harber	Diepsloot	Dawid de Villiers and Mathilda Slabbert, David Kramer: A Biography; Paul Holden and Hennie van Vuuren, The Devil in the Detail	
2011	Bill Nasson	The War for South Africa	Antony Altbeker, Fruit of a Poisoned Tree; Denis Beckett, Radical Middle	
2010	Elsa Joubert	Reisiger	Liz McGregor and Sarah Nuttall (eds.), Load Shedding; André P. Brink, ‘n Vurk in die pad; Alf Kumalo and Tanya Farber, Through my Lens	
2009	Tony Leon	On the Contrary	Julia Martin, A Millimetre of Dust	
2009	Jonny Steinberg	Three-Letter Plague	Julia Martin, A Millimetre of Dust	
2008	Mark Gevisser	Thabo Mbeki: The Dream Deferred	Andrew Feinstein, After the Party; David Robbins, On the Bridge of Goodbye	
2007	Leon Rousseau	Die groot avontuur	Mxolisi Mgxashe, Are You With Us?; Sarah Nuttall (ed.), Beautiful Ugly	
2006	Antony Altbeker	The Dirty Work of Democracy		
2005	Uma Dhupella-Mesthrie	Gandhi’s Prisoner?		
2004	Hermann Giliomee	The Afrikaners		
2003	Karel Schoeman	Die laaste Afrikaanse boek		
2002	Karel Schoeman	Die dogter van Sion		

== Elisabeth Eybers Prize ==
The Elisabeth Eybers Prize, named for Afrikaans poet Elisabeth Eybers, recognises poetry in English and Afrikaans. It aims to reward "excellence and innovation" in poetry, and was awarded for the first time in 2014.

Winners of the Elisabeth Eybers Prize (2014–2020)
Year	Winner	Work	Shortlisted works	Ref.
2020	Loftus Marais	Jan, Piet, Koos and Jakob	Ronelda Kamfer, Chinatown; Hennie Nortjé, Kryt; Mongane Wally Serote, Sikhahlel’ u-OR	
2019	Gabeba Baderoon	The History of Intimacy	Pieter Odendaal, Asof geen berge ooit hier gewoon het nie	
2018	Marlene van Niekerk	In die stille agterkamer	Corné Coetzee, Nou, hier; Jolyn Phillips, Radbraak; Nathan Trantraal, Alles het niet kom wôd	
2017	Bibi Slippers	Fotostaatmajien	Johann de Lange, ’n Hunkering se grein; Ronelda S. Kamfer, Hammie	
2016	Gilbert Gibson	Vry-	Daniel Hugo, Takelwerk; Marlise Joubert, Bladspieël	
2015	Antjie Krog	Mede-wete	T.T. Cloete, Karnaval en Lent; Charl-Pierre Naudé, Al die lieflike dade	
2014	Marlene van Niekerk	Kaar	Nathan Trantraal, Chockers en survivors; Wilma Stockenstrom, Hierdie mens	

== MER Prizes ==
The MER Prizes, named after Afrikaans children's author Mimie E. Rothmann, are longstanding awards which recognise illustrated children's books and youth literature, aimed at (but not exclusively for) ages 0–8 and 8–16 respectively. The prize in the children's category is split between the author and the illustrator.

Winners of the MER Prize for Youth Literature (2003–2020)
Year	Writer	Work	Ref.
2020	Edyth Bulbring	The Choice Between Us	
2019	S.A. Partridge	Mine	
2018	Carin Krahtz	Blou is nie ’n kleur nie	
2017	Edyth Bulbring	Snitch	
2016	Carin Krahtz	Elton amper famous April en juffrou Brom	
2015	Andre Eva Bosch	Alive Again	
2014	S.A. Partridge	Sharp Edges	
2013	Annelie Ferreira	Totsiens, Koning Arthur	
2012	S.A. Partridge	Dark Poppy’s Demise	
2011	Derick van der Walt	Willem Poprok	
2010	Peter Dunseith	The Bird of Heaven	
2009	Derick van der Walt	Lien se lankstaanskoene	
2008	S.A. Partridge	The Goblet Club	
2007	Jenny Robson	Praise Song	
2006	Fanie Viljoen	Breinbliksem	
2005	Anoeschka von Meck	Vaselinetjie	
2004	Willem van der Walt	Ragtime en rocks	
2003	Jackie Nagtegaal	Daar is 'n vis in die punch	

Winners of the MER Prize for Children's Books (2004–2020)
Year	Writer	Illustrator	Work	Ref.
2020	Fanie Viljoen	Theodore Key	Die dag toe die draak kom: ’n Boek vir meisies Die hasie van fluweel	
2019	Dihanna Taute	Theodore Key	Die legendariese Lua Verwey	
2018	Rosamund Haden	Tony Pinchuck	The All Africa Wildlife Express	
2017	Ingrid Mennen	Irene Berg	Ink	
2016	Elizabeth Wasserman	Astrid Castle	Jannus en Kriek en die tydmasjien	
2015	Fiona Moodie	Fiona Moodie	Noko and the Kool Kats	
2014	Linda Rode	Johann Strauss	In die land van pamperlang	
2013	Ingrid Mennen	Irene Berg	Ben en die walvisse	
2012	Alex D’Angelo	Marjorie van Heerden	Goblin Diaries	
2011	Wendy Hartmann	Joan Rankin	Just Sisi / Net Sisi	
2010	Linda Rode	Fiona Moodie	In the Never-Ever Wood	
2009	Mari Grobler	Elizabeth Pulles	Siyolo’s Jersey / Siyolo se trui	
2008	Wendy Hartmann	Marjorie van Heerden	Nina and Little Duck	
2007	Fanie Viljoen	Karl Stephan	Geraamte in die klas	
2006	Marita van der Vyver	Piet Grobler	Mia se Ma	
2005	Wynand Louw	Marjorie van Heerden	Mr Humperdinck’s Wonderful Whatsit	
2004	Martie Preller	Vian Oelofsen	Ek is Simon	

== Jan Rabie Rapport Prize ==
The Jan Rabie Rapport Prize, named for Afrikaans writer Jan Rabie, is awarded to debut or early works "characterised by fresh and innovative Afrikaans prose." It was given for the first time in 2004, and until 2014 was awarded with the Media24 Books awards, although it was open to books from all publishers. Since 2015, it has been awarded with the kykNET-Rapport Book Prizes, a group of Afrikaans literary awards.

Winners of the Jan Rabie Rapport Prize (2004–2021)
Year	Winner	Work	Ref.
2021	Anton Roodt	Weerlose meganika	
2020			
2019			
2018			
2017	Valda Jansen	Hy kom met die skoenlappers	
2016			
2015			
2014	Dominique Botha	Valsrivier	
2013	M.S. Burger	Bloedfamilie	
2012	S.J. Naudé	Alfabet van die voëls	
2011	Deborah Steinmair	Marike se laaste dans	
2010	Bettina Wyngaard	Troos vir die gebrokenes	
2009	Karin Cronje	Alles mooi weer	
2008	Willem Anker	Siegfried	
2007	Johan Engelbrecht	Kaffertjie	
2006	Marlize Hobbs	Flarde	
2005	Anoeschka von Meck	Vaselinetjie	
2004	Kleinboer	Kontrei	
