= Tlokwe Maserumule =

South African politician (born 1955)

Member of the National Assembly
- In office 29 July 2010 – 6 May 2014
- Constituency: Limpopo
- In office June 1999 – May 2009
- Constituency: Limpopo

Personal details
- Born: Frans Tlokwe Maserumule; 6 June 1955 (age 71)
- Citizenship: South Africa
- Party: African National Congress

Frans Tlokwe Maserumule (born 6 June 1955) is a South African politician and former anti-apartheid activist. He represented the African National Congress (ANC) in the National Assembly, serving the Limpopo constituency, from 1999 to 2009 and later from 2010 to 2014.

Moses Seletiša's Sepedi-language biography of Maserumule, Tšhutšhumakgala – Tša Bophelo bja Tlokwe Frans Maserumule, won the 2017 South African Literary Award for best debut work.

== Anti-apartheid activism ==
During apartheid, Maserumule was a member of the outlawed ANC and its military wing, Umkhonto we Sizwe (MK). In 2000, the Truth and Reconciliation Commission granted him amnesty in respect of his actions during an MK attack on a South African Defence Force counter-insurgency base at Tonga in 1982.

== Legislative career ==
Maserumule served two consecutive terms in the National Assembly from 1999 to 2009, gaining election in 1999 and 2004. During this time, there was a minor scandal in 2008 when South African Airways reported that he had been removed from an airplane, apparently after a drunken argument with another passenger.

Though not initially re-elected to his seat in the 2009 general election, Maserumule later returned to the National Assembly for a final term from 2010 to 2014, joining on 29 July 2010 to fill a casual vacancy.
