= Sol Plaatje Prize for Translation =

Biannual award for translation of prose or poetry

- Country: South Africa
- Status: Active
- First award: 2007

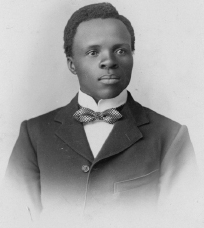
Sol Plaatje, namesake of the award.

The Sol Plaatje Prize for Translation is a bi-annual prize, first awarded in 2007, It is given for excellence in the translation of literary texts (prose or poetry) into English from any of the other South African official languages. The prize is administered by the English Academy of South Africa and is named in honour of the highly respected South African writer, intellectual, and political activist, Sol Plaatje. The award aims to encourage effective mutual understanding in the multilingual country and is granted for a translation of at least 1,000 words. It includes a cash prize (previously valued at around R7,000 South African Rand) in addition to an illuminated certificate. Notable winners include Leon de Kock and Karin Schimke (2018), and more recently, the late Cecil Wele Manona (2024) for his translation of DDT Jabavu's travelogue from isiXhosa into English.

== Award winners ==
- 2024 – Cecil Wele Manona (Posthumous) for In India and East Africa/E-India nase East Africa: A travelogue in isiXhosa and English (by DDT Jabavu), translated from isiXhosa.
- 2023 – Not Awarded.
- 2021 – Not Awarded.
- 2019 - Michiel Heyns for The Shallows (Vlakwater by Lettie Viljoen), from Afrikaans
- 2018 - Leon de Kock and Karin Schimke for Vlam in die Sneeu, from Afrikaans
- 2017 - Held over to 2018
- 2015 - Not awarded.
- 2013 - Daniel Sekepi Matjila and Karen Haire for Lover of His People: A biography of Sol Plaatje, from Setswana (by Seetsele Modiri Molema)
- 2011 - Daniel Kunene for My Child! My Child! by C. L. S. Nyembezi
- 2009 - Award withdrawn (Jeff Opland for Abantu Besizwe: Historical And Biographical Writings (by S.E.K. Mqhayi))
- 2007 - Michiel Heyns for Agaat (by Marlene van Niekerk)
