= University of Johannesburg Prize =

Annual prize for South African writing

The University of Johannesburg Prize
- Awarded for: Best work of creative writing
- Location: Johannesburg, South Africa
- Presented by: University of Johannesburg
- Formerly called: RAU-Prys vir Skeppende Skryfwerk
- Reward: R70 000 / R35 000 / R50 000

The University of Johannesburg Prize for South African Writing, also known as the UJ Prize, is awarded annually by the University of Johannesburg (UJ) for the best creative works in each of five categories: English, Afrikaans, Zulu, Northern Sotho, and Literary Translation. There are usually two prizes, a main prize and a debut prize, in each category. The prizes are not linked to a specific genre, and each year's prize rewards work published in the previous year. The winner of the main prize in each category receives R70 000, the winner of each debut prize receives R35 000, and the winner of the Literary Translation prize receives R50 000.

The Afrikaans prize has been awarded since 2001, but was previously called the RAU-Prys vir Skeppende Skyfwerk (RAU Prize for Creative Writing) and located at Rand Afrikaans University (RAU). In 2005, when RAU was merged with other institutions to establish UJ, the name of the prize was changed and the English category was introduced.

The Zulu, Northern Sotho, and Literary Translation prizes were awarded for the first time in 2021, with any work published between 2018 and 2020 eligible for entry.

Marlene van Niekerk, Willem Anker and S.J. Naudé have each won the Afrikaans prize three times; English translations of novels by Anker and Naudé have also won the UJ Literary Translation Prize, once each; in Naudé's case, he translated his own work.

== Prizes for South African Writing in English ==
Winners of the English prize (2009–2023)
Year	Prize	Winner	Work	Genre	Ref.
2024	Main	Morabo Morojele	Three Egg Dilemma	Fiction	
2024	Debut	Jarred Thompson	The Institute for Creative Dying	Fiction	
2023	Main	C. A. Davids	How to Be a Revolutionary	Fiction	
2023	Debut	Pulane Mlilo Mpondo	Things My Mother Left Me	Fiction	
2022	Main	Mandla Langa	The Lost Language of the Soul	Fiction	
2022	Debut	A’Eysha Kassiem	Suitcase of Memory	Fiction	
2022	Debut	Lisa-Anne Julien	If You Save Me	Fiction	
2021	Main	Jacob Dlamini	Safari Nation	Non-fiction	
2021	Debut	Rešoketšwe Manenzhe	Scatterlings	Fiction	
2021	Debut	Jamil F. Khan	Khamr: The Making of a Waterslams	Memoir	
2020	No prizes awarded				
2019	Main	Gabeba Baderoon	The History of Intimacy	Poetry	
2019	Debut	Mphuthumi Ntabeni	The Broken River Tent	Historical fiction	
2018	Main	Lesego Rampolokeng	Bird-Monk Seding	Fiction	
2018	Debut	Barbara Boswell	Grace	Fiction	
2017	Main	Nthikeng Mohlele	Pleasure	Fiction	
2017	Debut	Mohale Mashigo	The Yearning	Fiction	
2016	Main	Craig Higginson	The Dream House	Fiction	
2016	Debut	Eliza Kentridge	Signs for an Exhibition	Poetry	
2016	Debut	Nkosinathi Sithole	Hunger Eats a Man	Fiction	
2015	Main	Zakes Mda	Rachel's Blue	Fiction	
2015	Debut	Penny Busetto	The Story of Anna P, As Told By Herself	Fiction	
2014	Main	Lauren Beukes	The Shining Girls	Fiction	
2014	Debut	Dominique Botha	False River	Fiction	
2013	Main	Ken Barris	Life Underwater	Fiction	
2013	Debut	Steven Boykey Sidley	Entanglement	Fiction	
2012	Main	Craig Higginson	The Landscape Painter	Fiction	
2012	Debut	Terry Westby-Nunn	The Sea of Wise Insects	Fiction	
2011	Main	Ivan Vladislavic	Double Negative	Fiction	
2011	Debut	Shaida Ali	Not a Fairy Tale	Fiction	
2010	Main	Imraan Coovadia	High Low In-between	Fiction	
2010	Debut	Jacob Dlamini	Native Nostalgia	Non-fiction	
2009	Main	Dalmon Galgut	The Impostor	Fiction	
2009	Debut	Chris Marnewick	Shepherds and Butchers	Fiction	

== Prizes for South African Writing in Afrikaans ==
Winners of the Afrikaans prize
Year	Prize	Winner	Work	Ref.
2025	Main	Ingrid Winterbach	Onrus op Steynshoop	
2025	Debut	Gaireyah Friedericks	Een voet inni kabr	
2024	Main	S.J. Naudé	Van vaders en vlugtelinge	
2023	Main	Antjie Krog	Plunder	
2023	Debut	Carien Smith	BOT	
2022	Main	S.J. Naudé	Dol heuning	
2022	Debut	Ashwin Arendse	Swatland	
2022	Debut	Frederik de Jager	Man op ‘n fiets êrens heen	
2021	Main	Willem Anker	Skepsel	
2021	Debut	Ryan Pedro	Pienk ceramic-hondjies	
2020	Main	Etienne van Heerden	Die biblioteek aan die einde van die wêreld	
2020	Debut	Ruan Kemp	Gedeeltelik Bewolk	
2019	Main	Charl-Pierre Naudé	Die ongelooflike onskuld van Dirkie Verwey	
2019	Debut	Lodewyk G. Du Plessis	Die dao van Daan van der Walt	
2018	Main	S.J. Naudé	Die derde spoel	
2018	Debut	Jolyn Phillips	Radbraak	
2017	Main	John Miles	Op 'n dag, 'n hond	
2017	Debut	Bibi Slippers	Fotostaatmasjien	
2016	Main	Ena Jansen	Soos familie	
2016	Debut	Roela Hattingh	Kamee	
2015	Main	Willem Anker	Buys	
2015	Debut	Stephanus Muller	Nagmusiek	
2014	Main	Marlene van Niekerk	Kaar	
2014	Debut	Dominique Botha	Valsrivier	
2013	Main	Ingrid Winterbach	Die aanspraak van lewede wesens	
2013	Debut	André Kruger	Die twee lewens van Dieter Ondracek	
2012	Main	Dan Sleigh	Wals met Matilda	
2012	Debut	S.J. Naudé	Alfabet van die voëls	
2011	Main	Marlene van Niekerk	Die sneeuslaper	
2011	Debut	Nicole Jaekel Strauss	Maal	
2010	Main	Elsa Joubert	Reisiger	
2010	Debut	Karin Brynard	Plaasmoord	
2009	Main	Etienne van Heerden	30 Nagte in Amsterdam	
2009	Debut	Loftus Marais	Staan in die algemeen nader aan vensters	
2008	Main	Breyten Breytenbach	Die windvanger	
2008	Debut	Willem Anker	Siegfried	
2007	Main	Ingrid Winterbach	Die boek van toeval en toeverlaat	
2007	Debut	Danie Marais	In die buitenste ruimte	
2006	Main	André P. Brink	Bidsprinkaan	
2006	Debut	Marlize Hobbs	Flarde	
2005	Main	Marlene van Niekerk	Agaat	
2004	Main	Abraham H. de Vries	Tot verhaal kom	
2004	Debut	Marius Crous	Brief uit die kolonies	
2003	Main	Dan Sleigh	Eilande	
2003	Debut	Nini Bennett	Stoornis	
2002	Main	Rachelle Greeff	Merke van die nag	
2002	Debut	Nanette van Rooyen	Om te vlerk	
2001	Main	Antjie Krog	Kleur kom nooit alleen nie	

== Prizes for Creative Writing in Zulu ==
Winners of the Zulu prize (2021–2023)
Year	Prize	Winner	Work	Genre	Ref.
2024	Main	Ayanda Mchunu	Angikaze Ngikubone Okunje	Drama	
2024	Debut	Ethekwini writers	Iqoqo lezindatshana	Short stories	
2023	Main	Ndabayakhe William Zulu	Emzileni KaShaka	Historical fiction	
2022	Main	Ntombenhle Protasia Dlamini	Zinoju Zulu	Poetry	
2022	Main	Khanyelihle Mnguni	Kusazoba Mnandi	Short stories	
2022	Debut	Sandile Ngwenya	Imali Yezipoki	YA fiction	
2021	Main	E.D.M. Sibiya	Isibusiso Nezinyembezi	Poetry anthology	
2021	Debut	Mbusiseni Bhenya	UGovana kaGovana	Drama	

== Prizes for Creative Writing in Northern Sotho (Sesotho sa Leboa) ==
Winner of the Northern Sotho prize (2011–2023)
Year	Prize	Winner	Work	Genre	Ref.
2024	Main	Morema Jack Mabotja	Lentšu le a Khorwa	Drama	
2024	Debut	Mashikane W Madigoe	Tšhidi ya Koma	Poetry	
2023	Main	Moses Seletisha	Eto la Mofaladi	Biography	
2023	Debut	Ntloro Charlotte Pebane	Lerato la Lepheko	Fiction	
2022	Main	PM Mashilo & MT Masha	Ditsakauma Tša Marumo	Various	
2022	Debut	Kholofelo Thaba	Sedibeng sa Komelelo	Poetry	
2022	Debut	Mahlatsi Maqwenjo	Bohlale bjo foufetšego	Fiction	
2021	Main	Kobate John Sekele	Madimabe a Lešoko	Fiction	

== Prizes for Literary Translation ==
The translation prize is awarded for the translation of a literary text from any language into any one of the official South African languages. There is no debut prize for literary translation; instead, there is a prize for the translation of a youth text.

Winners of the Literary Translation prize (2021–2023)
Year	Prize	Winner	Work	Language	Ref.
2024	Main	Louise Cilliers	Van Alexandrië na Ithaka (original by Konstantinos Kavafis)	Greek to Afrikaans	
2023	Main	Henrietta Rose-Innes	A Library to Flee (Die biblioteek aan die einde van die wêreld by Etienne van Heerden)	Afrikaans to English	
2022	Main	S. J. Naudé	Mad Honey (Dol heuning by the same author)	Afrikaans to English	
2021	Main	Michiel Heyns	Red Dog (Buys by Willem Anker)	Afrikaans to English	
2021	Youth Text	Nathan Trantraal	Lang pad onnetoe (Long Way Down by Jason Reynolds)	English to Afrikaans	
