= Onke Mazibuko =

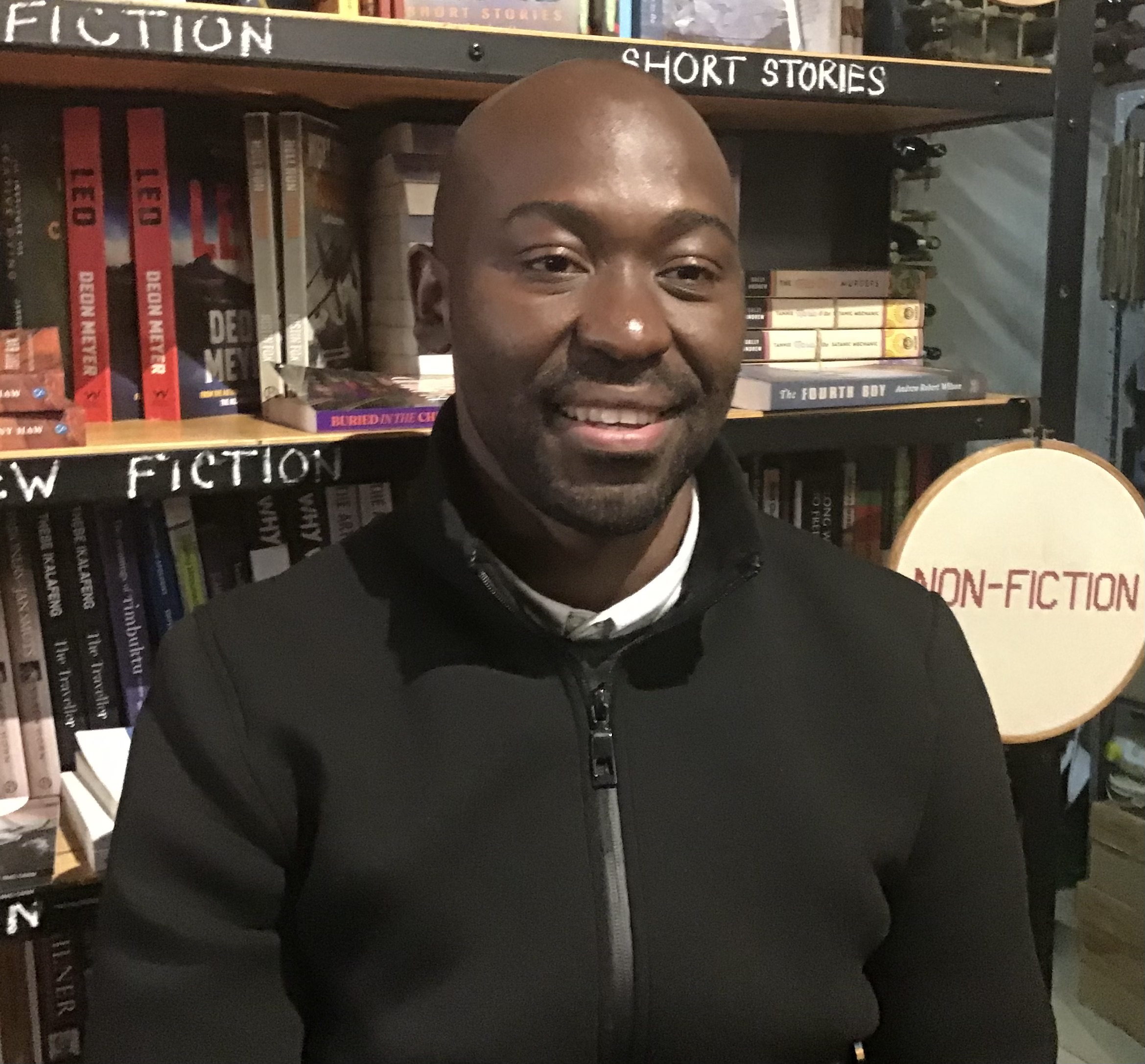
- Occupations: Author, psychologist
- Awards: South African Literary Awards (2023)

Onke Mazibuko is a Johannesburg-based psychologist, author and educator who specializes in working with youth and teachers. Mazibuko has a two master's degrees (Counselling Psychology and Public Health) and a PhD (Creative Writing) from Pretoria University. Mazibuko took responsibility for transformation, diversity & inclusion (TDI) at Kingsmead College, where he enjoyed connecting with young people. Mazibuko is also on a journey to becoming an author, and writes every day. The literary themes found in Mazibuko's books address issues related to coming of age, individual adversity, public and private well-being and personal limits. In 2023, he gained literary recognition when he won the SALA Youth Literature Award for his debut novel.

== Bibliography ==
=== Novels ===
- The Second Verse (2022) published by Penguin Books
- Canary (2025) published by Penguin Books
