= Yvette Christiansë =

South African-born poet and novelist based in New York

- Born: 12 December 1954 (age 71); South Africa
- Occupations: Novelist, poet, professor

Yvette Christiansë (born 12 December 1954) is a South African-born poet and novelist. She currently lives in New York City and teaches at Barnard College. She has also taught at Fordham University, also in New York City.

== Biography ==
Yvette Christiansë was born in South Africa while it was still under Apartheid, and, despite poor access to education, was interested in language and becoming a writer from a young age. At the age of 18, she emigrated with her mother and sister to Mbabane in Swaziland, where she lived until 1973. Following the move to Swaziland, she and her family moved to Australia in order to place further distance between themselves and the South African government. In Australia, Christiansë attended the University of Sydney. She received a PhD in English from the school.

She is friends with filmmaker William Kentridge, a fellow South African.

== Works ==
Christiansë's published work generally deals with South Africa, and contains post-colonial themes such as slavery and displacement.

She is the author of a novel entitled Unconfessed (Other Press, 2006; Kwela Books, 2007; Querido, 2007), and of the poetry collections Castaway (Duke University Press, 1999) and Imprendehora (Kwela Books/Snail Press, 2009). Imprendehora was a finalist for the Via Afrika Herman Charles Bosman Prize in 2010, and Castaway was a finalist in the 2001 PEN International Poetry Prize. Her novel, Unconfessed, was a finalist for the Hemingway Foundation/PEN Award for first fiction, and received a 2007 ForeWord Magazine BEA Award. It was also shortlisted for the University of Johannesburg Prize and the International Dublin Literary Award in 2008, and nominated for the Ama Ata Aidoo Prize 2010. Christiansë is the recipient of The Harri Jones Memorial Prize for poetry (Australia).
