= Niq Mhlongo =

South African journalist, editor, writer and educator

- Born: 1973 (age 52–53); Midway-Chiawelo, Soweto, South Africa
- Education: Malenga High School; University of the Witwatersrand; University of Cape Town
- Occupations: Journalist, editor, writer and educator

Niq Mhlongo (born 1973) is a South African journalist, editor, writer and educator.

== Early life and education ==
Mhlongo was born in Midway-Chiawelo, Soweto, the seventh of nine children, and raised in Soweto. His father, who died when Mhlongo was a teenager, worked as a post-office sweeper. Mhlongo was sent to Limpopo Province, the province his mother came from, to finish high school. Initially failing his matriculation exam in October 1990, Mhlongo completed his matric at Malenga High School in 1991.

He studied African literature and political studies at the University of the Witwatersrand, gaining a BA in 1996. In 1997, he enrolled to study law there, transferring to the University of Cape Town the following year. In 2000, he discontinued university study to write his first novel, Dog Eat Dog.

== Writing ==
Mhlongo was described by Rachel Donadio in The New York Times as "one of the most high-spirited and irreverent new voices of South Africa's post-apartheid literary scene".

Mhlongo has presented his work at the Caine Prize Workshop and the Zanzibar International Film Festival, and was a 2008 International Writing Program fellow at the University of Iowa. His work has been translated into Spanish, German, French, Dutch and Italian.

Mhlongo's writing has a post-apartheid backdrop. He is influenced by his hometown of Soweto; he pens his novels in Soweto, about Soweto and in Soweto dialect. His book Way Back Home was launched in Soweto. Xenophobia is another theme explored in Mhlongo's work.

== Publications ==
- Dog Eat Dog (Kwela, 2004)
- After Tears (Kwela, 2007)
- Way Back Home (Kwela, 2013)
- Affluenza (Kwela, 2016)
- Soweto, Under The Apricot Tree (Kwela, 2018)
- Black Tax (Jonathan Ball, 2019)
- Paradise in Gaza (Kwela, 2020)
- Joburg Noir (Jacana, 2020)
- Hauntings (Jacana, 2021)
- For You, I'd Steal a Goat (Kwela, 2022)
- The City is Mine (Kwela, 2024)

== Awards ==
- 2006 La Mar de Letras (Spanish literary award) for Dog Eat Dog
- 2019 Nadine Gordimer Short Story Award for Soweto, Under the Apricot Tree
- 2019 Media24 Books Literary Prize: Herman Charles Bosman Prize for Soweto, Under the Apricot Tree
- 2021 National Institute for Humanities and Social science Awards (HSS Awards), Best Fiction Edited Volume for Joburg Noir
- 2022 HSS Awards, Best Fiction Edited Volume for Hauntings
