= Sifiso Mzobe =

South African writer

- Born: Sifiso Mzobe; Durban, South Africa
- Education: St Francis College
- Occupation: Novelist

Sifiso Mzobe is a South African author.

== Biography ==
Mzobe is South African and was born and raised in the Durban township of Umlazi. He attended St Francis College in Mariannhill, then studied Journalism at Damelin Business Campus in Durban. He has worked for community newspapers and as a freelance journalist. His debut novel Young Blood (2010) won a number of awards, including the 2012 Wole Soyinka Prize for Literature in Africa, and was also listed in The Sunday Independent′s Top Ten Books of 2010.

== Awards and honours ==
- 2011 Herman Charles Bosman Prize, Young Blood
- 2011 South African Literary Award for a First-Time Published Author, Young Blood
- 2011 Sunday Times CNA Literary Award for Fiction, Young Blood
- 2012 Wole Soyinka Prize for Literature in Africa, Young Blood

== Bibliography ==
- Young Blood, Kwela Books, 2010
- Durban December, Kwela Books, 2015
- Searching for Simphiwe: And Other Stories, Kwela Books, 2020
