= Willem Anker =

South African writer

Willem Anker (born 1979) is a South African writer who writes in the Afrikaans language. He was born in Citrusdal in 1979. He studied at Stellenbosch University, where he now teaches creative writing. His debut novel, Siegfried, was published in 2007. His most noted work to date is Buys (2014) which was translated into English by Michiel Heyns as Red Dog and was longlisted for the 2020 International Booker Prize.

== Awards ==
- 2008 University of Johannesburg Prize, for Siegfried
- 2015 University of Johannesburg Prize, for Buys
- 2015 W.A. Hofmeyr Prize, for Buys
- 2016 Hertzog Prize, for Buys
- 2016 K. Sello Duiker Memorial Award, for Buys
