= Michiel Heyns =

South African author, translator and academic

- Born: 2 December 1943; Stellenbosch, South Africa
- Occupations: Author, Translator, Academic

Michiel Heyns (born 2 December 1943) is a South African author, translator and academic.

He went to school in Thaba 'Nchu, Kimberley and Grahamstown, and later studied at the University of Stellenbosch and Cambridge University before serving as a professor of English at the University of Stellenbosch, from 1983 until 2003.

Since then he has concentrated on his writing full-time, and has won numerous awards for his reviews, translations and novels.

== Novels ==
- The Children’s Day, Jonathan Ball (2002)
- The Reluctant Passenger, Jonathan Ball (2003)
- The Typewriter's Tale, Jonathan Ball (2005)
- Bodies Politic, Jonathan Ball (2008)
- Lost Ground, Jonathan Ball (2011)
- Invisible Furies, Jonathan Ball (2012)
- A Sportful Malice, Jonathan Ball (2014)
- I am Pandarus, Jonathan Ball (2017)
- A Poor Season for Whales, Jonathan Ball (2020)
- Each Mortal Thing, Umuzi (2023)

== Translations ==
- Marlene van Niekerk, Agaat (2006)
- Marlene van Niekerk, Memorandum: A Story with pictures (2006)
- Tom Dreyer, Equatoria (2008)
- Etienne van Heerden, 30 Nights in Amsterdam (2011)
- Chris Barnard, Bundu (2011)
- Eben Venter, Wolf, Wolf (2013)
- Ingrid Winterbach, It Might Get Loud (2015)
- Ingrid Winterbach, The Shallows (2017)
- Ingrid Winterbach, The Troubled Times of Magrieta Prinsloo (2019)
- Elsa Joubert: Cul-de-Sac (2019)
- Willem Anker, Red Dog (2019)
- SJ Naude, Fathers and Fugitives (2023)

== Awards ==
- 2006 Thomas Pringle Award for Reviews in 2006
- 2007 Sol Plaatje Prize for Translation for Agaat
- 2008 South African Translators' Institute Prize for Agaat
- 2009 Herman Charles Bosman Award for Bodies Politic
- 2010 Thomas Pringle Award for Reviews in 2010
- 2012 Herman Charles Bosman Award for Lost Ground
- 2012 The Sunday Times Fiction Prize for Lost Ground
- 2013 Prix de l'Union Interalliee for the French Translation of The Typewriter's Tale
- 2015 Herman Charles Bosman Award for A Sportful Malice
- 2019 SALA Prize for Literary Translation for Red Dog.
- 2020 Sol Plaatje Prize for Translation for The Shallows
- 2021 University of Johannesburg Prize for Literary Translation for Red Dog
