= Ingrid Jonker Prize =

South African literary award

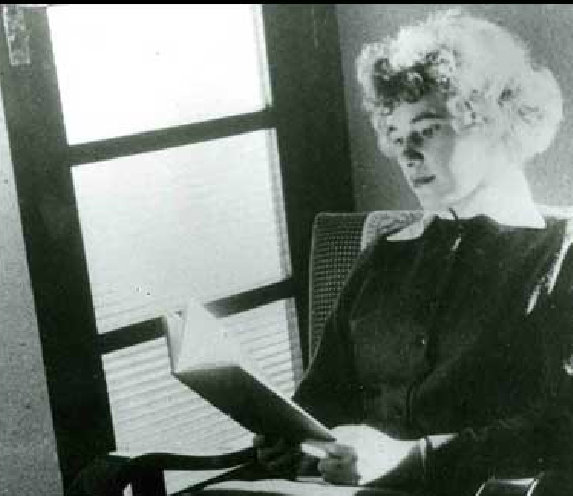
Ingrid Jonker, namesake of the prize, in 1956

The Ingrid Jonker Prize is a literary prize for the best debut work of Afrikaans or English poetry. It was instituted in honour of Ingrid Jonker after her death in 1965.

The yearly prize, consisting of R10,000 and a medal, is awarded alternately to an Afrikaans or English poet who has published a first volume in the previous two years.

== Background ==
The prize was set up after Jonker's death in 1965 by writer Jan Rabie with the money for the prize coming from other writers and friends of the poet. It was initially a prize of R50 and a medal with the works of poetry judged by critics appointed by the Board of Trustees.

== Award winners ==
- 2025 - Jaco Barnard-Naude - om my kastele in Spanje te sloop
- 2024 - Sarah Lubala - A History of Disappearance
- 2023 - Dominique Botha - Donkerberg
- 2022 - Jacques Coetzee - An Illuminated Darkness
- 2021 - Ryan Pedro - Pienk ceramic-hondjies
- 2020 - Saaleha Idrees Bamjee - Zikr
- 2019 - Pieter Odendaal - Asof geen berge ooit hier gewoon het nie
- 2018 - Sindiswa Busuku-Mathese - Loud And Yellow Laughter
- 2017 - Hilda Smits - die bome reusagtig soos ons was
- 2016 - Thabo Jijana - Failing Maths and my other crimes
- 2015 - Nathan Trantraal - Chokers en survivors
- 2014 - Karin Schimke - Bare & Breaking
- 2013 - Hennie Nortjé - In die skadu van soveel bome
- 2012 - Beverly Rycroft - Missing
- 2011 - Melt Myburgh - oewerbestaan
- 2010 - At first there was not to be an award; later it was announced that Tanya van Schalkwyk won for her volume Hyphen
- 2009 - Loftus Marais - Staan in die algemeen nader aan vensters
- 2008 - Megan Hall - Fourth Child
- 2007 - Danie Marais - In die buitenste ruimte
- 2006 - Rustum Kozain - This Carting Life
- 2005 - Ilse van Staden - Watervlerk
- 2004 - Finuala Dowling - i flying
- 2003 - Martjie Bosman - Landelik
- 2002 - Kobus Moolman - Time like stone
- 2001 - Zandra Bezuidenhout - Dansmusieke
- 2000 - Brian Walter - Tracks
- 1999 - Trienke Laurie - Skietspoel
- 1998 - Dan Wylie - The road out
- 1997 - Charl-Pierre Naude - Die nomadiese oomblik
- 1996 - Steve Shapiro - In a borrowed tent
- 1995 - Gert Vlok Nel - Om te lewe is onnatuurlik
- 1995 - Ken Barris - An advertisement for air
- 1994 - No award
- 1993 - P. J. Bosman - Ryp geel kring
- 1992 - Heather Robinson - Under the sun
- 1991 - H. J. Pieterse - Alruin
- 1990 - John Eppel - Spoils of War
- 1989 - Rosa Smit - Krone van die narsing
- 1988 - Graham Walker - The complete Libby Destrudo songbook
- 1987 - Donald W. Riekert - Heuning uit die swarthaak
- 1986 - No award
- 1985 - No award
- 1984 - Johann Lodewyk Marais - Die somer is 'n dag oud
- 1983 - Jeremy Cronin - Inside and out
- 1982 - Johann de Lange - Akwarelle van die dors
- 1981 - T. T. Cloete - Angelliera
- 1980 - No award
- 1979 - Mike Nicol - Among the souvenirs
- 1978 - Marlene van Niekerk - Sprokkelster
- 1977 - Colin Style - Baobab Street
- 1976 - J. C. Steyn - Die grammatika van liefhê
- 1975 - Mark Swift - Treading water
- 1974 - Leon Strydom - Geleentheidsverse
- 1973 - Mongane Wally Serote - Yakhal'Inkomo
- 1972 - Lina Spies - Digby Vergenoeg
- 1971 - No award
- 1970 - Sheila Cussons - Plektrum
- 1969 - Sinclair Beiles - Ashes of experience
- 1968 - M. M. Walters - Apocrypha and Cabala
- 1967 - Sydney Clouts - One life
- 1966 - D. P. M. Botes - Wat is 'n gewone man?
- 1965 - Ruth Miller - Floating island
