= Karin Schimke =

South African journalist and poet (born 1968)

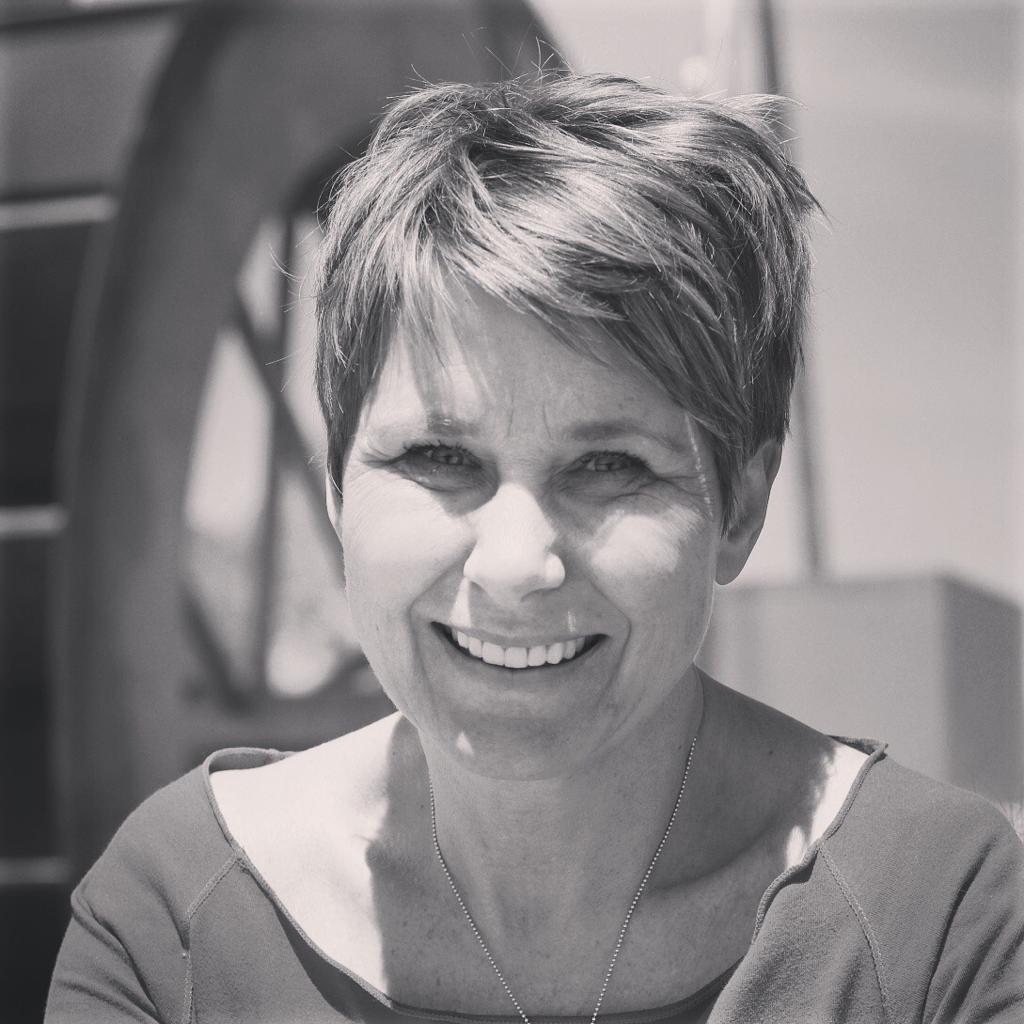
- Born: 1968 (age 57–58)
- Education: University of Pretoria, University of Stellenbosch (1991)
- Occupations: Writer and editor, poet, translator
- Notable work: Bare and Breaking (2012), Navigate (2017), The Karen Book of Rules (2020)
- Children: Oliver Keohane, Julia Keohane
- Awards: Ingrid Jonker Prize; Sol Plaatje Translation Award; SALA

Karin Schimke (born 1968) is a South African writer. She has won awards for her poetry and literary translations. She works as a writer and editor.

== Early life ==
Karin Schimke was born in1968 in Pretoria, South Africa to a German father and Afrikaans mother. She attended Clapham High School in Queenswood before going on to study languages at the University of Pretoria. She obtained a postgraduate degree in Journalism from the University of Stellenbosch and started her writing career in 1991, working as a bilingual news reporter at Die Eikestadnuus, an award-winning community newspaper in Stellenbosch. She started working full-time as a reporter for The Argus the following year. She spent two years working at The Star in Johannesburg but has spent most of her adult life in Cape Town.

== Career ==
=== Writing ===
Schimke worked at some of South Africa's largest newspapers including The Argus, The Star and The Cape Times, as a political reporter, before going freelance in 2000. She returned to The Cape Times for five years as the freelance books page editor from 2010 to 2015.

Schimke has contributed to a broad range of newspapers and magazines including Mail & Guardian, Daily Maverick., The Sunday Times, Marie Claire, Visi, Elle, Financial Mail, Business Day, African Decisions, The Argus, The Star, The Cape Times, Rapport, Fair Lady, Real Simple, High Life and Psychologies. She was a humour columnist for Femina magazine, as well as for Parent24

In 2006, Schimke co-authored the bestselling, Fabulously 40 and beyond: coming into your power and embracing change, with Margie Orford and her latest book, The Karen Book of Rules (NB Publishers) with comedy writer Karen Jeynes, was released in September 2020.

=== Poetry ===
Schimke's debut poetry collection, Bare & Breaking (Modjaji Books), was published in 2012. The collection won the Ingrid Jonker Prize in 2014. Her second volume, Navigate (Modjaji Books), was published in 2017.

She has performed her own poetry at the Woordfees, Badilisha Poetry X-Change, the Klein Karoo Nasionale Kunstefee and poetry-on-the-road in Bremen, Germany, in various podcasts and in radio interviews. Her work has been published in New Coin, New Contrast, Stanzas and Carapace and has been featured in Paris Lit Up magazine, Atlanta Review, Mslexia, as well as a collection of poetry from South Africa translated into German, called Ankunft eines weiteren Tages, published by Afrika Wunderhorn.

=== Translations ===
In 2019, Schimke, together with Leon de Kock, won the 2019 Sol Plaatje Translation Award for Flame in the Snow, the English translation of Vlam in die Sneeu, a collection of love letters written in the 1960s between novelist André Brink and poet Ingrid Jonker. She regularly translates the work of the well-known Afrikaans thriller writer Irma Venter.

=== Editor ===
Schimke edited Open (Oshun, Struik, 2008) a collection of women's erotic writing by some of South Africa's top female writers. She has edited the work of well-known South African authors like Martin Steyn, Chanette Paul, Dov Fedler and Bronwyn Davids

=== Writing coach ===
Schimke is a writing coach, developmental editor, course designer and mentor.

== Awards and honours ==
- Sol Plaatje Translation Award, 2019 for Flame in the Snow, an English translation of Vlam in die Sneeu. With Leon De Kock.
- South African Literary Awards, Translation Award, 2016 for Flame in the Snow: The Love Letters of Andre Brink & Ingrid Jonker.
- Ingrid Jonker Award for Poetry, 2014 for her debut collection, Bare and Breaking.
- Finalist in South African Literary Awards, 2013
- Finalist in Sol Plaatje European Union Poetry Award, 2013
- Winner of the Sylt Foundation Writer's Retreat in Sylt, Germany, 2013

== Selected works ==
=== Poetry ===
- Bare & Breaking (Modjaji Books 2012): ISBN 978-1-920397-97-5
- Navigate (Modjaji Books 2017): ISBN 978-1-928215-26-4.

=== Non-fiction books ===
- Fabulously 40 and Beyond: Coming into Your Power and Embracing Change (With Margie Orford - 30 September 2006). Spearhead P. ISBN 978-0-86486-588-5.
- The Karen Book of Rules with Karen Jeynes, 2020 ISBN 9780624090915
- Contraception and Prevention (Pearson Education 2011) ISBN 9780435074999
- The Internet (Pearson Education 2011) ISBN 0435075039

=== Journalist ===
‘We are all petrified.’ An interview with Robert A. Hamblin. Daily Maverick June 2021

=== Editor ===
- Open: An Erotic Anthology by South African Women Writers (Oshun 2008). ISBN 1770075720

=== Contributor ===
- Difficult to Explain (Modjaji Books 2010) ISBN 978-1-920397-23-4
- Living While Feminist: Our Bodies, Our Truths (NB Publishers). ISBN 9780795709418

=== Translation ===
- Flame in the Snow: The Love Letters of Andre P.Brink and Ingrid Jonker (Penguin Random House 2017) ISBN 9781415208786
