= Mike Nicol =

South African writer & journalist (born 1951)

Mike Nicol (born 1951 in Cape Town) is a South African writer and journalist.

== Biography ==
After completing his studies in Johannesburg, he worked as a journalist for the Leadership magazine.

In 1978, he published Among the Souvenirs, a collection of poems that won the Ingrid Jonker Prize in 1980. Mike Nicol is also one of the major authors of the South African thriller, with Deon Meyer and Roger Smith.

== Bibliography ==
=== Poetry ===
- Among the Souvenirs (1978) Ingrid Jonker Prize 1979
- This Sad Place (1993)

=== Novels ===
- The Powers That Be (1989)
- This Day and Age (1992)
- Horseman (1994)
- The Ibis Tapestry (1998)
- Payback (2008)
- Killer Country (2010)
- Black Heart (2011)
- Out to Score (2006)
- Of Cops & Robbers (2013)
- Power Play (2015)
- Agents of the State (2019)
- The Rabbit Hole (2021)
- Hammerman: A Walking Shadow (2022)

=== Short stories ===
- Bra Henry (1997)

=== Non fiction ===
- A Good-Looking Corpse (1991)
- A Waiting Country. A South African Witness (1994)
- The Invisible Line. The Life and Photography of Ken Oosterbroek (2000)
- Sea-Mountain, Fire City. Living in Cape Town at the Turn of the 20th Century (2001)
- The Firm: a Biography of Webber Wentzel Bowens (2006)
- Mandela. The Authorised Portrait (2006)
- John Lennon – Imagine (2008)
- Monkey Business. The Murder of Anni Dewani – the facts, the fiction, the spin (2011)
- Mandela. Celebrating the Legacy (2013)

=== Books for teens ===
- Africana Animals (1982)
- What Daddy Loves (2003)

== Prize and awards ==
- Ingrid Jonker Prize 1979
