= Siswati literature =

Literature written in the SiSwati language

Siswati literature refers to written works produced in the Siswati language by speakers primarily based in Eswatini and parts of South Africa, especially the Mpumalanga province. The literature includes academic works, novels, short stories, folktales, poetry and drama that reflect Swazi philosophy, history, beliefs, culture and social narratives.

== History ==
Siswati is part of the Nguni languages family and is closely related to Zulu. Prior to the independence of Eswatini from British colonial rule in 1968, written Siswati was not widely taught, and Swazi students often read Zulu literature in schools. Traditional oral forms such as praise poetry (tibongo), clan narratives and ritual songs served as the primary forms of literary expression.

The first efforts to standardize and promote written Siswati began after independence. In 1976, the Government of Eswatini established the Siswati Language Board to oversee orthographic and literary development, bringing in linguists and writers from both Eswatini and South Africa.

In South Africa, the Siswati language was officially introduced in schools in the early 1980s. The first known Siswati-language novel was published in 1986, titled Sandla Semtsetfo ("The Arm of the Law") and written by Dr. Gubudla Aaron Malindzisa.

The first full translation of the Bible into Siswati was completed and published by the Bible Society of South Africa in 1996.

Prior to this period, Siswati was widely spoken but rarely written, with Zulu commonly used as the written language in education, publishing and newspapers. Historian J.S.M. Matsebula also played an influential role in promoting the development of written Siswati.

== See also ==
- Swazi people
- Swazi culture
- Languages of South Africa
- Languages of Eswatini
