= Sydney Clouts =

South African poet

- Born: 1926 Cape Town, South Africa
- Died: August 1982 (aged 55–56)
- Education: University of Cape Town
- Genre: Poetry
- Notable works: One Life
- Notable awards: Ingrid Jonker Prize; Olive Schreiner Prize

Sydney Clouts (1926–1982) was a South African poet. He was born in Cape Town, South Africa, and emigrated to London in the early 1960s. His book One Life gained its own volume in the New Coin Poetry Magazine in 1966. This debut poetry collection, One Life, won him the Ingrid Jonker Prize in 1966 for the best debut of Afrikaans or English poetry. It also won him the Olive Schreiner Prize for new and emergent talent of English Literature.

== Biography ==
Sydney Clouts was born in Cape Town, South Africa, in 1926. As a young boy, Clouts wrote short stories about adventures, as well as poems. He served in the military and was active during World War II. After serving, he later worked as an editor and manager for the International Press Agency. Clouts attended the University of Cape Town, where he earned a BA in 1950. He also attended the South African College Schools. In the early 1960s, Clouts emigrated to the United Kingdom. In August 1982, Sydney Clouts died.

== Works ==
Sydney Clouts is described as a metaphysical poet by Kevin Goddard. Goddard explains that Clouts' writing style illustrates relations to elements of human experience. His poems were being published in magazines like Jewish Affairs, Standpunte, Contrast, and New Coin, and he started gaining popularity. His beginning poems were published in his former school, South African College's, magazine. His debut book, One Life (1966), was a collection of poems. In late 1966, Clouts' volume appeared in the New Coin Poetry Magazine. According to Guy Butler, this confirmed his reputation and gained new readers for Clouts. His other works include Sydney Clouts: Collected Poems (1984), which was a collection of his poems put together by his wife and brother that was published posthumously. It was published by David Philip of Cape Town. After One Life won both the Olive Schreiner Prize and the Ingrid Jonker Prize, Clouts didn't publish books anymore.

== Bibliography ==
- One Life (1966)
- Sydney Clouts: Collected Poems (1984)

== Awards ==
In 1966, Sydney Clouts was awarded the Ingrid Jonker Prize for the best debut of Afrikaans or English poetry, for his book One Life. He was also awarded the Olive Schreiner Prize for English Literature.
