= Ingoapele Madingoane =

South African poet and activist (1950–1998)

Ingoapele Madingoane (1950 - c. 1998) was a South African poet and activist, and a member of the group of Black poets that organized in Soweto during the Black Consciousness Movement. Mbulelo Mzamane called Madingoane one of "the most celebrated, prolific, and representative poets" of that movement, alongside Christopher van Wyk and Fhazel Johennesse.

Madingoane was born in Sophiatown, a suburb of Johannesburg. His best-known poem, "Africa my Beginning, Africa my Ending", was first published in 1979 by Johannesburg's Ravan Press (and a year later by Rex Collings, London) in a volume of the same title, which Mzamane called an epic. The authorities banned it within two months, as they did with many other literary works, mostly from Black South Africans. Madingoane performed the poem widely, backed by flutes and drums from Mihloti Black Theatre. By 2011, when the Index on Censorship dedicated an article to him and reprinted a number of poems from "Black Trial" (the introduction to the volume Africa My Beginning), he was described as a young, leading poet, whose poetry performances "take place at community centres and other venues in black townships, drawing large, responsive audiences: particularly on commemorative occasions, such as those held annually for the June 1976 Soweto uprising." Madingoane, who was primarily an oral poet to begin with, said he was careful about writing and printing his work, since he was subject to regular searches, including on 2 January 1984, when "Special Branch Security police searched his house for books and written material. Then they took 35 books and pamphlets to the police station. After being interrogated about his public readings at mass meetings, he was charged with being in possession of "undesirable publications".

He died, after a long illness, c. 1998.

He was granted a "Posthumous Literary Award" in 2006 (along with Bessie Head and James Moiloa) during the South African Literary Awards.

== Bibliography ==
- Africa My Beginning (Ravan Press, 1979)
