= Dan Sleigh =

South African novelist (born 1938)

- Born: 3 November 1938; Geelbeksfontein, Langebaan
- Died: July 2023 (aged 84)
- Occupation: Writer
- Writing career
- Notable works: Eilande; Afstande

Daniel (Dan) Sleigh was a South African historian, writer and conservationist. Sleigh is widely known for his writing and publications dealing with the history of the Cape in South Africa, which are in Afrikaans (with some works translated into English and Dutch).

His 2002 novel Eilande (Islands) is regarded as one of the quintessential historical novels set in time when the Dutch East India Company established a resupply outpost at the southwestern tip of Africa, now Cape Town.

== Early life ==
He was born on the farm Geelbeksfontein on the West Coast on 3 November 1938. He was born to Francis and Susanna Sleigh, both of whom were descended from ship captains. He matriculated at Vredenburg High School.

== Education & Career ==
Upon finishing high school, Sleigh joined the South African Navy. During his time in the navy, he travelled across Mombasa, Kenya and south of the Prince-Edward Islands along the Indian Ocean. After completing his service in the Navy, he went onto work as a bank clerk at Barclays Bank and a barman at Saldanha Hotel. He also worked as a fisherman and truck driver.

From 1960 until 1962, Sleigh studied to become a Physical Education teacher at the Paarl Training College. He went on to work as a physical education teacher in the early 1960s, teaching at Mariental High School in Namibia and the Marist Brothers College in Rondebosch, Cape Town.

In 1969 he completed his BA Degree in History and English Literature at the University of South Africa (UNISA). Sleigh then completed a MA Degree cum laude, followed by a Doctorate in History in 1987 at the University of Stellenbosch. His research dealt with the Dutch Seaborne Empire (1602 -1795), with a specific focus on the first Dutch colonial period at the Cape and the influence of maritime services on indigenous communities.

He took on several roles within the field of education, including the Head of the Centre for Conservation Education and Provincial Co-ordinator for Conservation Education for the Western Cape Education Department, where he retired in 1996.

Following his official retirement, he worked at the Cape Archives where he transcribed archives of the Dutch East India Company, laying the basis for his historical novels.

== Writing ==
He made his literary debut in 1974 with the volume of poetry entitled Duif oor water. This was followed by a series of novels for youth and adults and works of history throughout the 1970s and 1980s, like Tussen twee vlae and Onder die bittervaan. His 1980 history Jan Kompanjie: Die Wêreld van die Verenigde Oos-Indiese Kompanjie (Jan Compagnie: The World of the Dutch East India Company) formed a key account of the VOC and the Dutch colonial era.

His massive 2002 novel, Eilande (Islands), was published 20 years after Sleigh had begun it. It won many awards, starting with the Sanlam/Insig/Kwela Groot Romanwedstryd before publication. Once it was published, it won the WA Hofmeyer Prize, the RAU prize, the M-Net Prize and the Helgaard Steyn Prize. His later works, Wals met Matilda (2011) and 1795 (2016), would go on to win most of the same prizes, making him one of the most awarded novelists in Afrikaans.

== Death ==
On Friday 28 July 2023, Sleigh was found dead by a family member in his house. The cause of his death was not disclosed.

== Awards ==
- C Louis Leipoldt Prize (1971) – Duif oor water
- Winner of the Sanlam/Insig/Kwela Great Novel Competition (2001) – Eilande
- W.A. Hofmeyr Prize (2003) – Eilande
- RAU Prize for Creative Writing (2003) – Eilande
- M-Net Prize for Creative Writing in Afrikaans (2004) – Eilande
- Helgaard Steyn Prize (2004) – Eilande
- Medal from the Academy for Science and Culture (2007)
- K. Sello Duiker Memorial Literary Award for Afstande (2011)
- University of Johannesburg Prize for Wals met Maltilda (2012)
- SALA Novel Award for 1795 (2018)

== List of published works ==
Poetry
1971 Duif oor water, Tafelberg

Prose: Novels
1972 Die nege-maande-mars, Tafelberg
1973 ’n Man om te hardloop, Tafelberg
1977 Sersant Barodien, Kaapse Korps, Tafelberg
1978 ’n Kanon vir Barbier, Tafelberg
1979 Vryburger Tas, Tafelberg
2002 Eilande, Tafelberg
2010 Afstande, Tafelberg
2011 Wals met Matilda, Tafelberg

Prose: Youth novels
1974 Tussen twee vlae, Tafelberg
1975 Onder die bittervaan, Tafelberg
1976 Anselm en die jut, Van der Walt

Fiction
2016 1795, NB Publishers

Non-fiction
1978 Jan Kompanjie: die wêreld van die Verenigde Oos-Indiese Kompanjie, Tafelberg
1979 Ruiters teen die Ryk, Nasou
1988 The Huguenots (with AJ Grant and Ronald Mayo), Maskew Miller Longman
1993 Die buiteposte, HAUM
1996 The Forts of the Liesbeeck Frontier, Castle Military Museum
1999 The Ride Against an Empire, Castle Military Museum
2022 Retoervloot: Kaapstad en die VOC in 1713, NB Publishers

Translations

Eilande (2002) into English (Islands, 2004) and Dutch (Stemmen uit zee, 2004)
Afstande (2010) into Dutch (De lange tocht, 2011)
