= Moses Seletiša =

South African poet, writer and language activist (born 1986)

- Born: Moses Shimo Seletiša; 1986 (age 39–40); Ga-Matlala ‘a Rakgoadi, Limpopo, South Africa
- Education: University of South Africa
- Occupations: Poet, writer, biographer, translator, language activist

Moses Shimo Seletiša (born 1986) is a South African poet, biographer, translator, and language activist best known for his work in the Sepedi (Sesotho sa Leboa) language. He writes exclusively in his mother tongue and is regarded as one of the leading contemporary voices promoting indigenous-language literature in South Africa.

== Early life and education ==
Seletiša was born on 29 July 1986 and grew up in Ga-Matlala ‘a Rakgoadi near Marble Hall in the Limpopo province of South Africa. He attended his primary schooling at Tsimanyane Primary School and matriculated at Ngwanakwena Secondary School in 2006. Seletiša began writing poetry at the age of fifteen. Seletiša describes himself as a custodian of the Sepedi language, committed to preserving and advancing indigenous linguistic heritage. Seletiša holds a Bachelor of Arts in Environmental Management and BSc honours in Geography from the University of South Africa (UNISA).

== Career ==
Seletiša is active as a poet, performance poet, biographer, editor, translator, and cultural activist. He has been involved in workshops, mentoring programs, and literary development initiatives centred on promoting Sepedi literature and supporting writers working in marginalized languages.

Aside from his literary work, Seletisha has also worked in environmental compliance at the Witbank collieries, ensuring adherence to environmental legislation.

=== Literary contribution ===
His writing blends themes of identity, heritage, memory, and social justice, often highlighting the importance of linguistic and cultural preservation. He is widely recognized for pushing back against the dominance of English and Afrikaans in South African literature by championing Sepedi as a powerful literary medium.

== Works ==
=== Books ===
- Tšhutšhumakgala—a biography of community leader and freedom fighter Tlokwe Maserumule; his debut publication.
- Di a Galaka—a poetry collection published in 2024.
- Chifundo
- Re Batho le Mmino
- Morwaka Ruri!

=== Other writing ===
- Ke Hwa Natso! — drama.
- Ke rata Punky

== Awards ==
Seletisha has received several South African literary honours, including:

- Sol Plaatje European Union Poetry Award (2017) — for his poem Mahlalerwa, the first Sepedi poem ever to win the prize.
- SALA First-Time Published Author Award (2017) for Tšhutšhumakgala.
- PanSALB Multilingualism Award 2022.
- National Institute for the Humanities and Social Sciences for Non-fiction Award 2022.
- University of Johannesburg Creative Writing Prize (Sesotho sa Leboa) for Eto la Mofaladi.
- National Heritage Council Golden Shield Award 2019.
- Mail & Guardian 200 Young South Africans 2021
- AVBOB Poetry Prize (Sepedi category, 2024).
- South African Literary Awards—Best Literary Translators Award 2025.
- Mayoral Excellence Award from Ephraim Mogale Local Municipality 2025

== Themes and influence ==
Seletiša is known for elevating indigenous-language literature within South Africa's multilingual literary landscape. His work has influenced younger poets and writers committed to producing creative work in African languages and has contributed to the revitalization of Sepedi as a contemporary literary language.
