= Kgebetli Moele =

South African writer

- Born: Polokwane, South Africa
- Education: Tshebela High School, UNISA
- Occupation: Novelist
- Writing career
- Language: English
- Notable awards: South African Literary Award, Herman Charles Bosman prize,

Kgebetli Moele is a South African writer born in Polokwane, South Africa, best known for his novels Room 207, UNTITLED and The Book of the Dead.

Moele's first book, Room 207, was published in 2006 and went on to win first prize for both the University of Johannesburg prize and the Herman Charles Bosman Prize. In 2010 he won the South African Literary Award for his second book The Book of the Dead.

In 2011, he participated in the International Writing Program (IWP) Fall Residency at the University of Iowa in Iowa City, IA.

== Bibliography ==
Moele's published work consists of general fiction novels.

- Room 207 (2006) ISBN 0-79-570234-5
- The Book of the Dead (2009) ISBN 0-79-570288-4
- Untitled (2013) ISBN 0-79-570494-1
