= S. J. Naudé =

South African author and lawyer (born 1970)

S.J. Naudé
- Born: Stephanus Jacobus Naudé; 1970 (age 55–56); Pretoria, South Africa
- Notable work: The Alphabet of Birds The Third Reel Mad Honey Fathers and Fugitives

Stephanus Jacobus Naudé (born 1970) is a South African author and lawyer. He has written two novels and two collections of short stories.

Naudé studied at Cambridge University and Columbia Law School. He practiced as a lawyer in New York and London for many years before returning to South Africa.

His debut book, The Alphabet of Birds (2013), was originally written in Afrikaans and has won several prizes including two University of Johannesburg Prizes and a South African Literary Award. He also received the 2014 Jan Rabie and Marjorie Wallace Writing Scholarship, the largest award for creative writing in South Africa. In 2015 Alfabet van die voëls was published in English as The Alphabet of Birds by And Other Stories.

He lives in Cape Town, South Africa.

== Awards ==
- 2012 South African Literary Awards First-time Published Author Award: Afrikaans for Alfabet van die voëls
- 2012 University of Johannesburg Prize for Alfabet van die voëls
- 2014 Jan Rabie and Marjorie Wallace Writing Scholarship
- 2018 University of Johannesburg Prize for Die derde spoel
- 2018 kykNET-Rapport Prize for Fiction for Die derde spoel
- 2019 Hertzog Prize for Die derde spoel
- 2022 University of Johannesburg Prize for Dol Heuning
- 2022 Hertzog Prize for Dol Heuning
- 2022 Nadine Gordimer Short Story Award for Mad Honey
- 2023 CL Engelbrecht Prize for Literature for Dol Heuning
- 2024 South African Literary Awards: Novel Award for Van vaders en vlugtelinge
- 2024 University of Johannesburg Prize for South African Writing in Afrikaans for Van vaders en vlugtelinge

== Works ==
- (2015) The Alphabet of Birds. And Other Stories. (af: Alfabet van die voëls) ISBN 9781908276445
- (2018) The Third Reel (af: Die derde spoel). Salt Publishing Ltd. ISBN 9781784631505
- (2020) Mad Honey (af: Dol heuning). Penguin Random House Publishing. ISBN 9781415210673
- (2024) Fathers and Fugitives (af: Van vaders en vlugtelinge). Europa Editions. ISBN 9781787705432
