= T. T. Cloete =

South African poet and writer

- Born: Theunis Cloete; 31 May 1924; Vredefort, Orange Free State
- Died: 9 July 2015 (aged 91); Potchefstroom, South Africa
- Education: Highschool Monument
- Occupations: Academic, poet
- Writing career
- Language: Afrikaans
- Notable awards: Ingrid Jonker Prize; Hertzog Prize; W.A. Hofmeyr Prize; Andrew Murray Prize
- Website: ttcloete.com

Theunis Theodorus Cloete (31 May 1924 – 9 July 2015) was a South African Afrikaans poet, Bible translator, essayist and academic. In the 1970s he was involved in the revision of the ''Afrikaanse Kerkgesange'' and later in the 1993 translation of the Bible. Cloete was linked to The University of Potchefstroom's (now North-West University) School of Language and Literature. He has won numerous literary awards, including the Ingrid Jonker Prize, W.A. Hofmeyr Prize, Hertzog Prize (twice) and the Andrew Murray Prize. Cloete mostly wrote under the penname T. Jansen van Rensburg (his grandfather's name) and published numerous of his poems in magazines under the penname to test the water before his 1980 debut Angelliera.

== Publications ==
=== Poetry ===
- 1980 Angelliera
- 1982 Jukstaposisie
- 1985 Allotroop
- 1986 Idiolek
- 1989 Driepas
- 1992 Met die aarde praat
- 1998 Uit die hoek van my oog
- 2001 Die baie ryk ure: 100 uitgesoekte gedigte
- 2007 Heilige nuuskierigheid
- 2010 Uit die wit lig van my land gesny. Vir Anna
- 2011 Onversadig
- 2014 Karnaval en Lent

=== Short stories ===
- 1984 Die waarheid gelieg
- 1997 Identikit

=== Plays ===
- 1986 Onderhoud met ’n bobbejaan

=== Academic publications ===
- 1953 Trekkerswee en Joernaal van Jorik : twee gedigte met historiese materiaal uit twee fases van die Afrikaanse letterkunde
- 1957 Beskouings oor poësie: ’n bundel opgedra aan prof. G. Dekker op sy sestigste verjaardag 11 November 1957 (met andere)
- 1961 Die wêreld is ons woning nie: ’n studie van die poësie van Totius met tekste
- 1963 Totius
- 1963 Op die woord af: opstelle oor die poësie van N.P. van Wyk Louw
- 1963 Eugène N. Marais
- 1966 Gids by D.J. Opperman se Senior Verseboek
- 1970 Twee idilles: Martjie en Trekkerswee (Blokboek)
- 1970 Tetralogie van F.A. Venter
- 1970 Kaneel: Opstelle oor die letterkunde
- 1972 Sensuur: prinsipieel en prakties besien
- 1974 Joernaal van Jorik (Blokboek)
- 1974 N.P. van Wyk Louw, 11 Junie 1906 – 18 Junie 1970
- 1978 Totius se organiese beskouing (Langenhovengedenklesing)
- 1980 Die Afrikaanse literatuur sedert sestig
- 1980 Van Wyk Louw se fundamenteel dramatiese instelling (NP van Wyk Louw-gedenklesing)
- 1982 Die verhouding tussen die skrywer en sy volk
- 1982 Hoe om ’n gedig te ontleed (Blokboek)
- 1984 Wat is literatuur?
- 1993 Die literatuur en sy verband met die tyd
- 2004 Van Leopold Tot Achterberg

=== Editor and co-editor ===
- Die Afrikaanse literatuur sedert sestig (together with A.P. Grové, J.P. Smuts and Elize Botha), 1980
- Gids by die literatuurstudie (together with Elize Botha and Charles Malan), 1985
- Literêre terme en teorieë (together with Hein Viljoen, Leon Strydom, Heilnadu Plooy and Anne-Marie Bosschoff), 1992

=== Other ===
- Van Hooft tot Luyken (together with G. Dekker), 1961
- Van Hendrik van Veldeke tot Spieghel, 1963
- Vyfling, 1966
- Faune, 1966
- Poort 1972 (together with P.D. van der Walt and L. Dekker) 1973
- Totius: Vyftig gedigte, 1876
- Lens 78/79 (together with Rudolph Willemse), 1979
- Dit kom van ver af, 2002

=== Translations ===
- Meneer Perrichon gaan op reis – E. Labiche en Ed. Martin, 1962

== Awards ==
- 1976 Gustav Preller medal for Literature and Literary Criticism
- 1980 Ingrid Jonker Prize for Poetry (Angelliera)
- 1981 W.A. Hofmeyr Prize for Poetry (Angelliera)
- 1983 Louis Luyt Prize (Jukstaposisie)
- 1985 CNA Prize (Allotroop)
- 1986 W.A. Hofmeyr Prize (Allotroop)
- 1986 Honorary Doctorate from the University of Potchefstroom
- 1987 Hertzog Prize for Poetry (Allotroop and Idiolek)
- 1990 W.A. Hofmeyr Prize (Driepas)
- 1992 Rapport Prize (Met die aarde praat)
- 1993 Rapportryers Prize for Poetry (Met die aarde praat)
- 1993 Hertzog Prize for Poetry (Met die aarde praat)
- 2002 Andrew Murray Prize
- 2002 N.P. van Wyk Louw medal
- 2007 FAK-erepenning
- 2008 Honorary membership of the Suid-Afrikaanse Akademie vir Wetenskap en Kuns
- 2016 South African Literary Awards Posthumous Literary Award
