= Eben Venter =

- Born: Burgersdorp, South Africa
- Occupation: Novelist
- Writing career
- Notable awards: W.A. Hofmeyr Prize; M-Net Literary Award

Eben Venter is an Afrikaans-speaking writer who was born in Burgersdorp in South Africa and has lived in Australia, Japan and the Netherlands. He published thirteen works of fiction (novels, short story collections and a cookbook). His works have been translated into English, Dutch and German.

He was awarded the M-Net Literary Award in 2010 for his book Santa Gamka.

== Life ==
Venter was raised on a farm in Eastern Cape. He went to Grey College in Bloemfontein before he was conscripted into the air force and served on the Angolan border. He obtained an MA in Philosophy and worked as a journalist in Johannesburg before leaving South Africa in 1986, during the State of Emergency. He went to Australia where he worked as a chef in his sibling's café.

In 2005, Venter taught at Adam Mickiewicz University and Palacky University before becoming a writer-in-residency at the Netherlands Institute for Advanced Study in 2007.

On August 4, 2010, Venter was nominated for the M-Net Literary Award in the Afrikaans category for his book Santa Gamka.

The Nelson Mandela Metropolitan University awarded him as an alumni achiever in November 2011. In 2012, he was writer-in-residence at Rhodes University. In 2018, Venter released his first book created in English instead of Afrikaans titled Green as the sky is blue.

== List of titles ==
- 1986 Witblitz
- 1993 Foxtrot van die vleiseters, translated into German by Stefanie Schäfer (Burenfoxtrott) and Dutch by Riet de Jong-Goossens (Dans aan het einde van de dag)
- 1996 Ek stamel, ek sterwe, translated into English by Luke Stubbs (My Beautiful Death) and Dutch by Riet de Jong-Goossens (Ik stamel ik sterf)
- 1999 My simpatie, Cerise
- 2000 Twaalf
- 2003 Begeerte
- 2006 Horrelpoot, translated into English by Luke Stubbs (Trencherman)
- 2009 Santa Gamka
- 2010 Brouhaha
- 2013 Wolf, Wolf, translated into English by Michiel Heyns
- 2017 Groen soos die hemel daarbo, translated into English (Green as the sky is blue) by the author
- 2023 Decima, translated into Afrikaans by the author

== Awards ==
- 1994 Media24 Books Literary Awards (WA Hofmeyr Prize) – Foxtrot van die vleiseters
- 1996 Media24 Books Literary Awards (WA Hofmeyr Prize) – Ek stamel, ek sterwe
- 2004 Media24 Books Literary Awards (WA Hofmeyr Prize) – Begeerte
- 2010 Media24 Books Literary Awards (WA Hofmeyr Prize) – Santa Gamka
- 2010 M-Net Literary Awards – Santa Gamka
