= Zulu literature =

Overview of literature written in Zulu language

Zulu literature refers to the body of written and oral literary works produced in the Zulu language, a Bantu language spoken primarily in South Africa. The work encompasses traditional oral poetry and storytelling, as well as modern works in prose, poetry, short stories and drama. The literature reflects Zulu culture, history and social dynamics, and has evolved from oral traditions to include influential written texts.

== Origins ==
Zulu literature has its roots in oral traditions, including praise poetry (izibongo), folktales (izinganekwane), and proverbs. Praise poems, often performed to honour chiefs and warriors, played a key role in preserving historical narratives and social values.

The first Zulu texts in print appeared in the 19th century, largely in the form of religious texts and translations by Christian missionaries. One of the earliest writers in Zulu was Magema Magwaza Fuze, author of Abantu Abamnyama Lapa Bavela Ngakona (1922), the first book written by a Zulu author in Zulu. His work is often considered the beginning of modern Zulu literature.

=== Notable authors ===
- Rolfes Robert Reginald Dhlomo, author of uDingiswayo KaJobe and uShaka, historical novels based on Zulu kings.
- Mazisi Kunene, known for Emperor Shaka the Great and other epic poems rooted in Zulu oral traditions.
- Oswald Mtshali, a poet who wrote Sounds of a Cowhide Drum (1971), capturing life under apartheid.
- Benedict Wallet Vilakazi, often considered the father of modern Zulu poetry, blending classical Zulu forms with Western influences.

=== Genres ===
Zulu literature spans various genres, including:

- Historical novels, often dramatizing the lives of Zulu kings like Shaka Zulu, Cetshwayo, and Mpande kaSenzangakhona.
- Poetry, especially politically charged or resistance poetry during apartheid.
- Folktales, typically featuring anthropomorphized animals and moral lessons.
- Drama, with plays performed in Zulu capturing social issues and cultural dynamics.

With the growth of education and publishing, Zulu literature has expanded, with more contemporary authors writing fiction, children's literature, and academic texts in Zulu. The South African Department of Arts and Culture and various universities support the preservation and growth of indigenous language literature.

== See also ==
- Zulu language
- South African literature
- Xhosa literature
