= Sally Partridge =

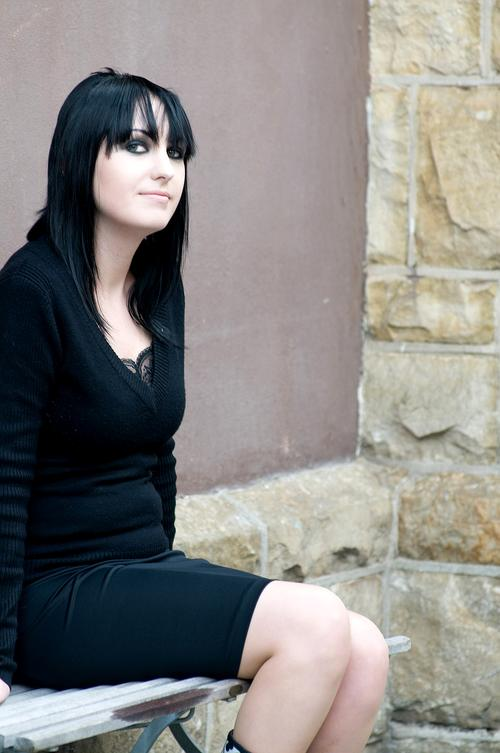
- Born: 17 August 1982 (age 44); Cape Town, South Africa
- Occupation: Novelist
- Writing career
- Genre: Young adult fiction
- Website: sallypartridge.com

Sally Partridge (born 17 August 1982 in Cape Town, South Africa) is an author of young adult fiction novels and short stories. She currently lives in Cape Town. For her contribution to South African literature, Partridge was named one of Mail & Guardian’s 200 Young South Africans, a distinction awarded annually to notable South Africans under the age of 35.

== Books ==
Partridge is the author of Goblet Club, a young-adult fiction novel set in the South African Platteland, published in South Africa by Human and Rousseau Publishers in 2007. The novel won the SABC/You magazine I am a writer Competition in 2007, as well as the MER Prize for Best Youth Novel at the Mnet Via Afrika Awards in 2008.

Her second novel, Fuse, deals with the sensitive subjects of school killings, bullying and runaways, and is set on the streets of Cape Town and Pretoria. The novel was shortlisted for the Percy Fitzpatrick Prize for Youth Fiction awarded by the SA English Academy.

Partridge’s third novel, Dark Poppy’s Demise, tells the story of sixteen-year-old Jenna Brooks who falls prey to an Internet predator on Facebook. The novel was awarded the MER Prize for Best Youth Novel, at the Media24 Literary Awards (previously the Via Afrika Awards).

Her fourth novel, Sharp Edges, was published in August, 2013. In the same year, Partridge was shortlisted for the Commonwealth Short Story Prize.

Her short story, "The Expedition", was published in the Home Away anthology.

She jointly won the 2022 Percy FitzPatrick Award for her novel, Sea Star Summer.

== Bibliography ==
- The Goblet Club (2007, Human and Rousseau)
- Fuse (2009, Human and Rousseau)
- Home Away (2010, Zebra)
- Dark Poppy's Demise (2011, Human and Rousseau)
- Sharp Edges (2013, Human and Rousseau)
- Mine (2018, Human and Rousseau)
- Sea Star Summer (2020, Human and Rousseau)
- The Girl Who Chased Otters (2021, Modjaji Books)
- Leo Jantjies and the Esports World Championship (2023, Human and Rosseau)
- The Witches of Hogsback (2023, LAPA Publishers)
- Slaying in Sedgefield (2025, LAPA Publishers)
- The Ophelias (2026, Kindle exclusive)
- The Bone Sellers (2026, Kindle exclusive)
