= Peter Mtuze =

South African civil servant

The Revd Professor Peter Tshobisa Mtuze was a poet, priest and academic. He worked as an interpreter in the law courts of the old South Africa, a radio announcer, a salesperson for a publishing company, a civil servant in the homeland government structures, a lecturer at Unisa, an Editor in Chief of the Greater Dictionary of isiXhosa at Fort Hare, before joining Rhodes University as Professor and Head of the isiXhosa Department.

== Early life ==
Mtuze was born on a farm in the district of Middelburg, Eastern Cape in 1941.

He grew up in the districts of Middelburg and Cradock where he passed the then Junior Certificate and started working in the South Africa civil service as court interpreter clerk in various towns.

He joined the South African Broadcasting Corporation as an announcer, producer and translator at the King William’s Town studios in 1969.

From 1971 to 1976 he worked for Via Afrika Publishers and from 1976 to 1985 he worked in the Ciskei Government Services in various capacities culminating with the position of Director of Language Services.

== Academic career ==
From 1985 to 1988 he lectured at University of South Africa and took over as Editor in Chief of the Greater Dictionary of isiXhosa at University of Fort Hare, before joining Rhodes University as its first black professor and head of department in 1988 where he worked in various capacities until the end of 2006.

He holds the following qualifications – B.A. (Translation) (Rhodes), Hons B.A., M.A., B.Th. (Unisa), M.Th. (Rhodes) and a Ph.D. from University of Cape Town.

== Literary career ==
Mtuze started writing in the mid-1960s and has written more than 30 books. His writings cover all genres – novels, short stories, essays, poetry, drama and translation. Some of the books were co-authored with either budding or established authors.

=== Publications ===
His works include

- Bishop Doctor S. Dwane and the Rise of Xhosa Spirituality in the Ethiopian Episcopal Church (formerly The Order of Ethiopia). University of South Africa. 2008.
- Sinxo, Guybon Budlwana; et al. (1979). UNomsa. Oxford University Press, South Africa. ISBN 978-0-19-570173-9.
- An alternative struggle: an illustrated autobiography. Vivlia. 2007. ISBN 978-1-77024-000-1.
- Kaschula, R. H.; et al. (1993). Izibongo zomthonyama. Oxford University Press. ISBN 978-0-19-570748-9.
- Hidden Presences in the Spirituality of the AmaXhosa of the Eastern Cape and the Impact of Christianity on Them. 1999.
- An alternative struggle: an illustrated autobiography. Vivlia. 2007. ISBN 978-1-77024-000-1.
- Jeff Opland, ed. (2016). John Solilo: Umoya Wembongi Collected Poems (1922-1935). The Opland Collection of Xhosa Literature. Translated by Peter T. Mtuze. University of KwaZulu-Natal Press. ISBN 978-1869143121.

== Ecclesiastical career ==
He is an Anglican priest, archdeacon and canon in the Diocese of Grahamstown and is the rector (self supporting) of the parish of St. Andrew Ginsberg and St. James Peddie.
