= Marlene van Niekerk =

South African poet, writer, and academic

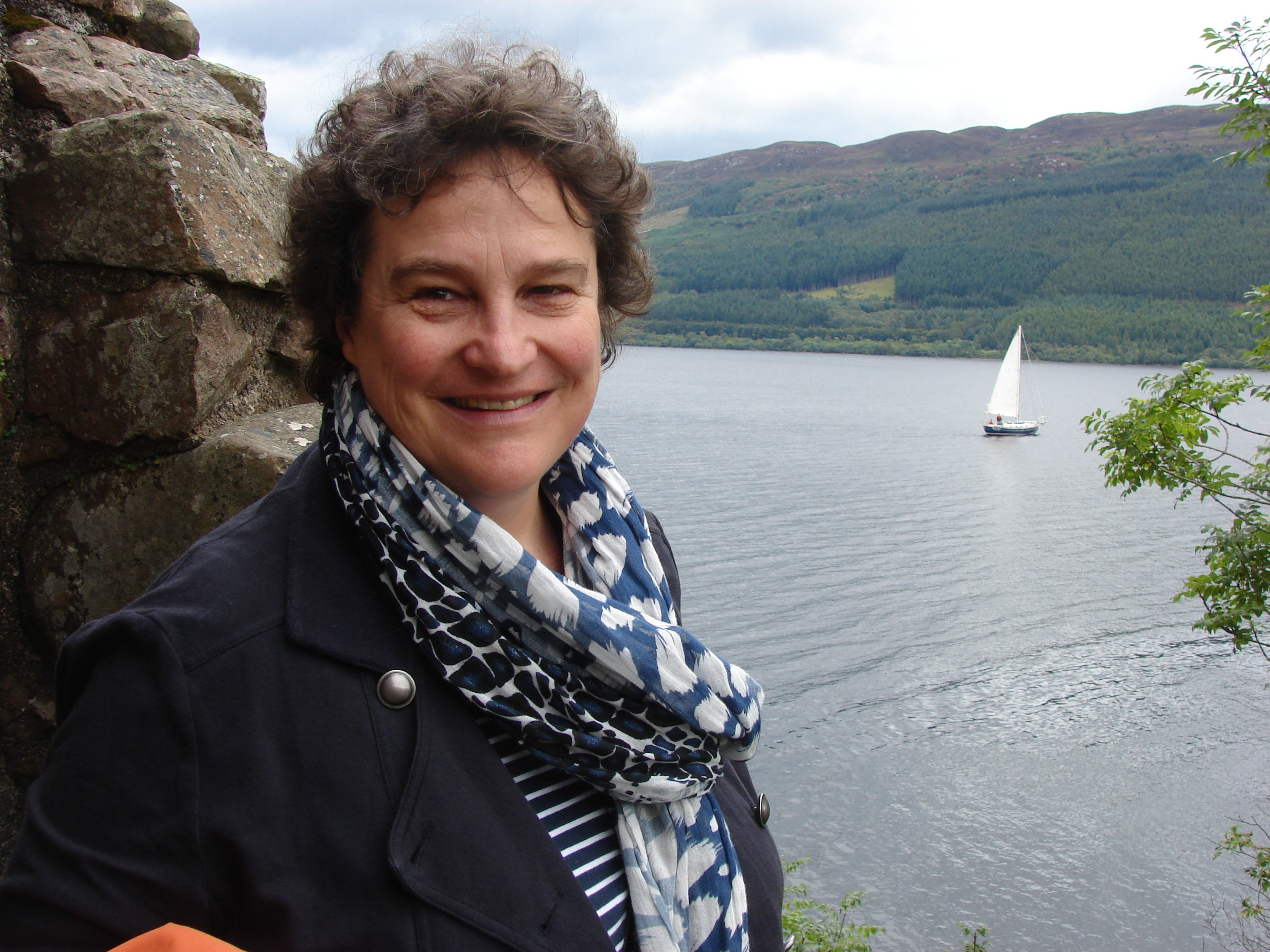
- Van Niekerk (2018)
- Born: 10 November 1954 (age 71) near Caledon, Western Cape, South Africa
- Writing career
- Notable awards: Ingrid Jonker Prize; Noma Award for Publishing in Africa; Hertzog Prize (twice); Order of Ikhamanga

Marlene van Niekerk (born 10 November 1954) is a South African poet, writer, and academic. She is best known for her novels, the satirical tragicomedy Triomf (1994) and the Hertzog-winning Agaat (2004), which explore themes including the family, the change in power dynamics occasioned by the end of Apartheid, and inequalities of race, gender, and class. Van Niekerk is also a poet. She writes in her native tongue, Afrikaans, and teaches at Stellenbosch University.

== Biography ==
Marlene van Niekerk was born on 10 November 1954 on Tygerhoek farm near Caledon in the Western Cape of South Africa. She attended school in Riviersonderend and Stellenbosch, matriculating from Hoërskool Bloemhof.

She studied languages and philosophy at Stellenbosch University. She published her literary debut while still a student – Sprokkelster (1977), a volume of poetry, won the Eugène Marais Prize and the Ingrid Jonker Prize. In 1978, she obtained a Master's degree, with a thesis titled "Die aard en belang van die literêre vormgewing in 'Also sprach Zarathustra'" ("The nature and significance of the literary design in 'Also sprach Zarathustra'"). In 1985, she obtained a Dutch doctorandus in philosophy from the University of Amsterdam. Her thesis was on the works of Claude Lévi-Strauss and Paul Ricoeur, and was titled "Taal en mythe: een structuralistische en een hermeneutische benadering" ("Language and myth: a structuralist and a hermeneutic approach").

Van Niekerk later taught philosophy at the University of Zululand and the University of South Africa, and from 1989 taught Afrikaans and Dutch literature at the University of the Witwatersrand. Currently, she is associate professor at Stellenbosch University's Afrikaans and Dutch department, where she teaches creative writing. She has published two novels, five volumes of poetry, and several short story collections.

Theatre

While an undergraduate, van Niekerk wrote three plays for amateur theatre. In 1979, between her Master's and her doctorate, she moved to Germany to study directing as an apprentice at theatres in Stuttgart and Mainz. In April 2011, her play Die korstondige raklewe van Anastasia W, set in a funeral parlour, was staged in Stellenbosch under the direction of Marthinus Basson. It divided audiences (and provoked several angry letters to the editor in Afrikaans newspapers), with one favourable review calling it "a baroque assault of forms, idioms, wordplay, lyricism, operatic tragic-comic interludes, Brechtian theatrical alienation, and ripping symbolic violence."

== Novels ==
=== Triomf (1994) ===
Triomf (1994) is a tragicomedy about the Benade family: Mol, her brothers Treppie and Pop, and her son Lambert. Unemployed, they live in Triomf (“triumph”), a poor white suburb of Johannesburg, which was built on the ruins of Sophiatown, the famous black township, after the Apartheid government razed it down in the 1950s. The book opens in late 1993, with South Africa’s first democratic elections impending, and chronicles the Benades’ relationships with each other – they reel between hostility and (sometimes incestuous) intimacy – and their difficulties adapting to the new, post-Apartheid South Africa. Among other themes, the novel explores Apartheid's class dimensions and the status of poor whites in South Africa, who, van Niekerk suggests, were ostensibly the beneficiaries of Apartheid, but in fact became downtrodden and disfigured by its ideology.

It received generally, but not exclusively, positive reviews, both in South Africa and abroad. The New York Times called it South Africa's "only world-class tragicomic novel, the kind of book that stabs at your heart while it has you rolling on the floor." Reviewers complimented the effectiveness of van Niekerk's satirical treatment of the Benades' racism and sexism.

Triomf was dramatised in a 2008 film, directed by Michael Raeburn.

=== Agaat (2004) ===
Agaat (2004), van Niekerk's second novel, takes place in 1996, when Kamilla (Milla) de Wet is in the late stages of motor neurone disease, deteriorating daily into complete paralysis and able to communicate only by blinks and glances. Agaat is the name she has given to her longstanding maid, on whom she now relies for her care. In this way, the shift in the power dynamics between Milla and Agaat mirror those occurring on a national level in post-Apartheid South Africa. By way of first-person narrative and extracts from her diaries from the 1950s, Milla reflects on her earlier life, as her relationship with Agaat begins to take on extraordinary significance in her memories, dwarfing her relationships with her son and with other men.

The novel was met with critical acclaim. Liesl Schillinger of the New York Times called its register "more generous and humane" than that of Triomf, and said that it exemplified "the reason people read novels, and the reason authors write them." Writing in Bookforum, Mary Gaitskill said it was "extraordinary." Agaat won seven South African literary awards, and Michiel Heyns won the 2007 Sol Plaatje Prize for Translation for his translation of Agaat into English.

Asked about Agaat's depiction of the separation between men and women, van Niekerk said that she was inspired by gender dynamics in Afrikaner culture, and by her experience of being treated, as a lesbian, as an outsider in the Afrikaner community.

== Bibliography ==
=== Novels ===
- Triomf (1994; English version: Triomf, trans. Leon de Kock, 2000)
- Agaat (2004; English version: Agaat or The Way of the Women, trans. Michiel Heyns, 2007)
- Memorandum: 'n verhaal met skilderye, with pictures by Adriaan van Zyl (2006, English version: Memorandum: A Story with Paintings, trans. Michiel Heyns)

=== Poetry ===
- Sprokkelster, 1977
- Groenstaar, 1983
- Kaar, 2013
- Gesant van die mispels: gedigte by skilderye van Adriaen Coorte ca. 1659-1707 (2017)
- In die stille agterkamer: gedigte by skilderye van Jan Mankes 1889-1920 (2017)

=== Short stories ===
- Die vrou wat haar verkyker vergeet het (1992)
- Die verleiding van Margarethe van Vliet deur die misbruik van die poësie en ander verhale (1999) (erotic stories in Dutch)
- Die sneeuslaper: verhale (2010; English version: The Snow Sleeper, trans. Marius Swart, 2019)
- The Swan Whisperer (2015; trans. van Niekerk and Marius Swart)

Van Niekerk's work has also been translated into French, Danish, Italian, Swedish, and, frequently, Dutch.

== Awards ==
Novels

- M-Net Literary Award (1995) for Triomf
- CNA Prize (1995) for Triomf
- Noma Award for Publishing in Africa (1995) for Triomf
- M-Net Literary Award (2005) for Agaat
- W.A. Hofmeyr Prize (2005) for Agaat
- University of Johannesburg Prize for Afrikaans Creative Writing (2005) for Agaat
- Hertzog Prize (2007) for Agaat
- Suid-Afrikaanse Akademie vir Wetenskap en Kuns C.L. Engelbrecht Prize (2007) for Agaat
- Sunday Times Literary Award (2007) for Agaat
- Helgaard Steyn Prize (2008) for Agaat
- Shortlisted for the Independent Foreign Fiction Prize (2008) for Agaat

Poetry and short stories

- Eugène Marais Prize (1977) for Sprokkelster
- Ingrid Jonker Prize (1978) for Sprokkelster
- University of Johannesburg Prize for Afrikaans Creative Writing (2011) for Die Sneeuslaper
- University of Johannesburg Prize for Afrikaans Creative Writing (2014) for Kaar
- Elisabeth Eybers Prize (2014) for Kaar
- Hertzog Prize (2014) for Kaar

In 2011, the South African president awarded van Niekerk the Order of Ikhamanga (Silver) or her "outstanding intellectual contribution to the literary arts and culture." She was nominated for the 2015 Man Booker International Prize, and has honorary doctorates from Tilburg University and Stellenbosch University.
