= Lettie Viljoen =

- Born: 14 February 1948 (age 78); Johannesburg, South Africa
- Education: University of Stellenbosh
- Occupation: Novelist
- Spouse: Andries Gouws
- Children: 2 daughters
- Writing career
- Language: Afrikaans
- Notable awards: Hertzog prize
- Website: ingridwinterbach.com

Lettie Viljoen was a pseudonym of the South African author Ingrid Winterbach, who primarily writes in Afrikaans. She lives in Jamestown, Stellenbosch.

== Life and education ==
Winterbach was born in Johannesburg in 1948. She got her early education from Florida High School, Johannesburg and studied Afrikaans, Dutch and Fine Arts at the University of the Witwatersrand, and went on to a postgraduate degree in Afrikaans and Dutch at the University of Stellenbosch under D.J. Opperman. She went on to work as a teacher, a journalist, a Fine Arts lecturer at the University of Stellenbosch and a lecturer in Afrikaans and Dutch at the University of Natal. She has been a full-time writer and painter since 2002. Most of her mature novels have been translated into Dutch and English (chiefly by Michiel Heyns).

== List of titles ==
=== As Lettie Viljoen ===
- 1984 Klaaglied vir Koos
- 1986 Erf
- 1990 Belemmering
- 1993 Karolina Ferreira (published in English as The Elusive Moth, 2005)
- 1996 Landskap met vroue en slang

=== As Ingrid Winterbach ===
- 1999 Buller se Plan
- 2002 Niggie (published in English as To Hell with Cronje, 2007)
- 2006 Die Boek van Toeval en Toeverlaat (published in English as The Book of Happenstance, 2008)
- 2010 Die Benederyk (published in English as The Road of Excess, 2014)
- 2012 Die Aanspraak van Lewende Wesens (published in English as It Might Get Loud, 2015)
- 2015 Vlakwater (published in English as The Shallows, 2017)
- 2018 Die Troebel Tyd (published in English as The Troubled Times of Magrieta Prinsloo, 2019)
- 2021 Voorouer. Pelgrim. Berg.
- 2024 Onrus op Steynshoop

== Awards ==
- 1994 M-Net Literary Awards – Karolina Ferreira
- 1994 Old Mutual Literary Award – Karolina Ferreira
- 2000 WA Hofmeyr Prize – Buller se plan
- 2004 Hertzog Prize for Prose – Niggie
- 2007 WA Hofmeyr Prize – Die boek van toeval en toeverlaat
- 2007 M-Net Literary Awards – Die boek van toeval en toeverlaat
- 2007 University of Johannesburg Prize for Creative Writing – Die boek van toeval en toeverlaat
- 2010 South African Literary Award for literary translation for the translation of Die boek van toeval en toeverlaat
- 2012 C.L. Engelbrecht Prize for Literature – Die boek van toeval en toeverlaat
- 2012 NB-Uitgewers Groot Romankompetisie – Die aanspraak van lewende wesens (Human & Rousseau)
- 2013 M-Net Literary Awards - Die aanspraak van lewende wesens
- 2013 Hertzog Prize for Prose – Die aanspraak van lewende wesens
- 2013 WA Hofmeyr Prize (Media24 Books Literary Awards) – Die aanspraak van lewende wesens
- 2024 University of Johannesburg Prize for South African Writing in Afrikaans – Onrus op Steynshoop
