= Etienne van Heerden =

South African author

Etienne van Heerden, born 3 December 1954, is a South African author.

== Biography ==
Van Heerden was born in 1954, six years after the official advent of apartheid. His mother was an English speaking mathematics teacher. His father, an Afrikaans speaking merino stud breeder, farmed the family farm in the Karoo. Van Heerden was reared Afrikaans, with English reserved for use at home on Tuesdays, and learned from comics ordered from London.

Due to being born blind in the right eye, he was not called up for combat duty, but served as a dog handler, playing his alsatian at major festivals.

Van Heerden initially studied law, and was admitted to the South African Side Bar as attorney. He freelanced as deputy sheriff for the Civil Court, and moved about in the townships around Cape Town, dispensing civil summonses and learning a great deal about life in these suppressed communities. As a young practitioner, his clients were mostly from the black and coloured crime-ridden communities around Cape Town.

Van Heerden also lectured Legal Practice at the Peninsula Technikon and spent two years in advertising. At age thirty, with the birth of his eldest daughter, Van Heerden left the routine of a budding Cape Town advertising agency. He and his family relocated to northern Natal where he started out on his academic career in Literature at the University of Zululand. His PhD was a study on engagement and postmodernism.

During the 1980s he was member of a group of Afrikaans writers secretly meeting the banned ANC of Mandela and exiled writers at the (now famous) Victoria Falls Writers’ Conference, held in Zimbabwe.

Van Heerden is seen as member of a generation of Afrikaans artists who contributed significantly to opening up the Afrikaner psyche to change.

He regularly teaches at universities in Europe, and has been Writer in Residence at the University of Leiden in the Netherlands, and the University of Antwerp in Belgium. He was a member of the University of Iowa's prestigious International Writing Program in 1990, and has been back on visits to this university, of which he is an Honorary Fellow in Writing. He has regularly read his fiction at events such as the Edinburgh Festival in Scotland, the Winter Nights Festival in the Hague, Netherlands, the Time of the Writer Festival in Berlin, Germany, the Zimbabwe International Book Fair and other festivals and events internationally.

Despite being at times at odds with the apartheid government, van Heerden never left South Africa permanently, and now teaches at the University of Cape Town, where he is the Hofmeyr Professor in the School of Languages and Literatures, and chairs the Afrikaans and Netherlandic Studies Section. His current activities at the University of Cape Town include the supervision of Creative Writing, where he has led a generation of young Afrikaans authors to published status, and the lecturing of courses in Literary Theory, Media Studies, and South African and Dutch Literature.

Van Heerden is married to Kaia, a practising doctor, and lives in Stellenbosch. The couple has two daughters, Imke and Menán.

Although he lives in the Western Cape, Van Heerden returns, in his writing, to the Karoo of his childhood. He describes this arid and mythological part of South Africa's deep interior is his own "landscape of the mind".

He serves on the board of directors of NB Publishers, which includes, amongst others, Kwela, Tafelberg, Best Books and Human and Rousseau publishers.

== Awards ==
- Toorberg – WA Hofmeyr Award (Via Afrika Awards); ATKV-prys, CNA Literary Award; 1989 Hertzog Prize (Hertzogprys) for prose
- Die Swye van Mario Salviati – 2001 M-Net Literary Awards (Afrikaans category)
- 30 Nagte in Amsterdam – 2009 M-Net Literary Awards (Afrikaans category); 2009 WA Hofmeyr Award (Via Afrika Awards); 2009 UJ Prize; 2010 Hertzog Prize (Hertzogprys) for prose

== Works ==
Van Heerden has published two books of poetry, two books of short stories, a collection of cabaret songs, theoretical and academic work, and novels. His activity spans a wide range – a syndicated columnist in the major three Afrikaans dailies, published countrywide in South Africa, his own program on satellite television, and founder-editorship of one of the few South African internet startups.

=== Creative work ===
- Matoli (1978) Youth novel.
- Obiter Dictum (1983) Poetry.
- My Kubaan (1983) Short stories.
- Om te AWOL (1984)
- Toorberg (English: Ancestral Voices) (1986, 1989)
- Die Laaste Kreef (1987) Poetry.
- Liegfabriek (1988) Short stories.
- Casspirs en Campari's (English: Casspirs and Camparis) (1991, 1993)
- Die Stoetmeester (English: Leap Year) (1993, 1997)
- Kikoejoe (English: Kikuyu) (1996, 1998)
- Lied van die Boeings (1998) Cabaret.
- Die Swye van Mario Salviati (English: The Long Silence of Mario Salviati) (2000, 2002)
- In Stede van die Liefde (English: In Love's Place) (2005, 2011)
- Asbesmiddag (2007)
- Mad Dog and Other Stories (2007) (Collected short stories from My Kubaan (1983) & Liegfabriek (1988))
- 30 Nagte in Amsterdam (English: 30 Nights in Amsterdam) (2008, 2011)
- Klimtol (2013)
- Die Wêreld van Charlie Oeng (2017)
- Die Biblioteek aan die Einde van die Wêreld (2019. Translated in English by Henrietta Rose-Innes and published as A Library to Flee in 2022)
- Gebeente (2023)
