= List of Afrikaans-language poets =

List of poets

This list of Afrikaans language poets includes poets who write, or wrote, in the Afrikaans language.

== A ==
- Hennie Aucamp

== B ==
- Peter Blum
- Breyten Breytenbach

== C ==
- Jan F. E. Celliers
- T.T. Cloete
- Sheila Cussons

== D ==
- Johann de Lange
- I. D. du Plessis
- Phil du Plessis

== E ==
- Elisabeth Eybers

== H ==
- Joan Hambidge
- Daniel Hugo

== J ==
- Theo W. Jandrell
- Ingrid Jonker

== K ==
- Olga Kirsch
- Koos Kombuis
- Uys Krige
- Antjie Krog

== L ==
- C. J. Langenhoven
- C. Louis Leipoldt
- N. P. van Wyk Louw
- W.E.G. Louw

== M ==
- Lucas Malan
- D. F. Malherbe
- Eugene Marais
- Mikro (pseudonym for Christoffel Hermanus Kühn)

== N ==
- Gert Vlok Nel

== O ==
- D. J. Opperman

== P ==
- Mathews Phosa

== S ==
- Adam Small
- Lina Spies

== T ==
- Totius

== V ==
- C. M. van den Heever
- Ernst van Heerden
- N. P. van Wyk Louw

== W ==
- George Weideman

== See also ==
- Afrikaans literature
- List of Afrikaans singers
