= Ballade des seigneurs du temps jadis =

Poem by François Villon

La Ballade des seigneurs du temps jadis (Ballad of the Lords of former times) is one of the poems by François Villon which follows the Ballade des dames du temps jadis and precedes Ballade en vieil langage françoys which constitute the triptych of the ballads at the center of his Testament or Grand Testament, at the opposite of the Small Testament, whose very name appears undue, even according to him (the Lais, "the legacy" in modern French, written well before).

== Date of the poem ==
Doubts remain on the exact date of writing, and the text is potentially composed in several times, but in 1461 a priori in the fall, or even the winter, due in particular to the reference to the deceased King of France mentioned and the fact that we know (even if we do not know why) that imprisoned in Meung-sur-Loire during the summer, he would have been released by the new king amnesting the various common law prisoners during his stay in this city. It is commonly accepted for the whole of the text that it is an evocation of his own supposed and anticipated death (even if his real death, its place, its date and its conditions are totally uncertain), and therefore, the majority of the characters mentioned are famous people and whose death is recent during the writing. This is also to be opposed to the rare characters quoted whose life and death is older (Charlemagne, or Bertrand Du Guesclin), but whose merits would be superior to recent famous deaths ?

The chronology is important for the interpretation of the story, because the description of the Lords is sometimes vague. And to be contrasted with the Ballade des dames du temps jadis directly preceding this one, where the ancient (and sometimes false) or at least older figures are numerous.

The probably voluntary imprecision of a part of the Lords mentioned is therefore compensated, in large part, by the fact that one can consider recent deaths from the point of view of François Villon when writing the text. The mediocrity of the recent figures mentioned compared to the rare historical figures probably gives a view of the relative value that François Villon gave himself.

The date of 1461 (date of the accepted writing of the Testament) and certain precise indications such as the death of Calixtus III at the beginning of the poem probably make it possible to reconstitute some of the lords mentioned.

== Title ==
The Ballade des seigneurs du temps jadis is an opposition to the Ballade des dames du temps jadis which it follows in the Testament, where the opposition is obviously on gender, but also on chronology. Where the first readily refers to figures from the past, even mythological, with some exceptions, the second mainly refers to famous people who died shortly before writing, with some exceptions. The title is not from the author, but from Clément Marot in his 1533 edition which has been the de facto reference ever since.

== Background ==
The accepted hypothesis being that his potentially imminent death due to his recent incarceration, due to the fact that he was subjected there to torture (with water) reminds him of the recent deaths of famous people (ecclesiastical lords or sovereigns) at the by which he judges himself (for example, he no longer even knows the name of the sovereign of Spain), and whom he compares to real lords, in rhyme ending a stanza or in the despatch, with an exclamation ("!") rather than a query ("?"). However, it remains extremely difficult to know if the historical lords or celebrities of the time of writing are the same as those prevailing today, in particular on the two inaccuracies of the dispatch. We can also say that to a very large extent, the setting to music (and song) by Georges Brassens on the Ballade des dames du temps jadis could also have been applied to this specific poem, because of the rhythmic and rhyme structure similar.

== Shape ==
It is a ballad, a frequent form in Villon's work. Using the octosyllable, it obeys the following rules of composition :

- three eighths followed by a quatrain named dispatch;
- three rhymes in A, B and C;
- the rhymes are arranged in ABABBCBC in the eights and in BCBC in the dispatch.

The Parisian language of the time, sometimes colored with Poitevin expressions of the time that François Villon heard a little, as well as the successive editions explain the apparent non-rigor of the respect of these rules for the modern reader.

== Text and transcript ==
Here is the text, its transcription in modern French and in English :

Original	Modern French translation	English Translation
Qui plus ? Où est le tiers Calixte, Dernier decedé de ce nom, Qui quatre ans tint le Papaliste ? Alphonse, le roy d’Aragon, Le gracieux duc de Bourbon, Et Artus, le duc de Bretaigne, Et Charles septiesme, le Bon ?... Mais où est le preux Charlemaigne ! Semblablement, le roy Scotiste, Qui demy-face eut, ce dit-on, Vermeille comme une amathiste Depuys le front jusqu’au menton ? Le roy de Chypre, de renom; Helas ! et le bon roy d’Espaigne, Duquel je ne sçay pas le nom ?... Mais où est le preux Charlemaigne ! D’en plus parler je me desiste; Le monde n'est qu'abusion. Il n’est qui contre mort resiste, Ne qui treuve provision. Encor fais une question : Lancelot, le roy de Behaigne, Où est-il ? Où est son tayon ?... Mais où est le preux Charlemaigne ! ENVOI. Où est Claquin, le bon Breton ? Où le comte Daulphin d’Auvergne, Et le bon feu duc d’Alençon ?... Mais où est le preux Charlemaigne !	Qui d’autre ? Où est Calixte III, Dernier décédé de ce nom, Qui occupa le siège de pape pendant quatre ans ? Alphonse, le roi d’Aragon, Le gracieux duc de Bourbon, Et Arthur, le duc de Bretagne, Et Charles VII, le Bon ?... Mais où est le preux Charlemagne ! De la même manière, le roi d’Écosse, Qui, disait-on, avait un demi-visage, Vermeil comme une améthyste Depuis le front jusqu’au menton ? Le roi de Chypre, de renom; Hélas ! Et le bon roi d’Espagne, Don't je ne sais [même] pas le nom ?... Mais où est le preux Charlemagne ! Je n’en parlerai pas plus longtemps; Ce ne serait qu’un abus. Il n’est [personne] qui résiste contre la mort, Qui ne trouve [moyen] de s’en protéger. J'ai encore une question : Ladislas, le roi de Bohême, Où est-il ? Où est son aïeul ?... Mais où est le preux Charlemagne ! ENVOI Où est Du Guesclin, le bon Breton ? Où est le comte Dauphin d’Auvergne, Et feu le bon duc d’Alençon ?... Mais où est le preux Charlemagne !	Who else ? Where's Calixtes the Third, the last descended of that name, Pope for four years ? And who has heard lately of Aragon's king Alphonse ? The same of Bourbon's gracious Duke ? What's understood of Brittany's Duke Arthur ? What the fate of Charles the Seventh, known as the Good ? And where is Charlemagne the Great ? And what of Scots king, James the Second, the one half of whose face from brow right down to chin, so it is reckoned, was amethyst-red from birth? What now of Cyprus’ famous king and lord ? And woe ! Spain's king whose name and date I can't recall – there's the reward ?! And where is Charlemagne the Great ? Of such matters I speak no more. The world's abuses take us in. No-one is proof against Death's door nor finds effective medicine. However (I'll make this the last !), what was Bohemia's Lancelot's fate – his life, just like his grandad's passed : And where is Charlemagne the Great ? DISPATCH Clacquin, brave Breton knight is – where ? Count Dauphin of the Auvergne's in what state ? And Alençon, both brave and fair ? And where is Charlemagne the Great?
