= Ballade en vieil langage françoys =

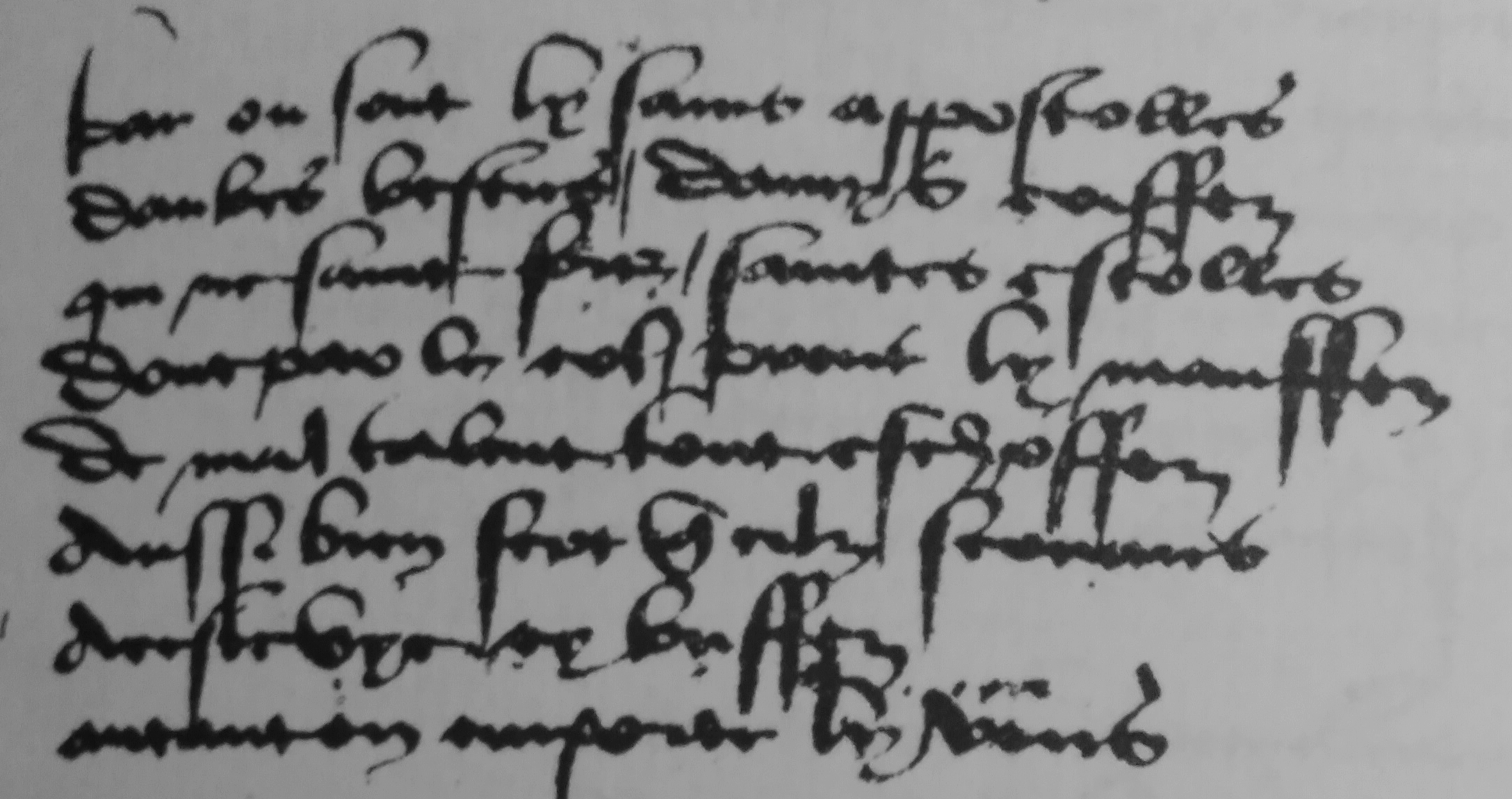

La Ballade en vieil langage françoys is a poem by François Villon. Following on from the Ballade des dames du temps jadis and the Ballade des seigneurs du temps jadis, it closes the triptych of ballads which occupies the beginning of his Testament.

It is written in “vieille langage françoys”, that is to say in old French. But Villon speaks Middle French. He therefore uses a language that his contemporaries no longer practiced, and that he himself knew only poorly (See François Villon, Œuvres, par Louis Thuasne, Tome II: Commentaire et notes, Éditeur: Auguste Picard, 1923, p. 164, "Other ballad" section).

== Title ==
Several editions indicate Autre ballade à ce propos en vieil langage françois, which suggests that it is related to the two preceding ones. The author himself does not indicate a title.

== Theme ==
As in the Ballade des dames du temps jadis and the Ballade des seigneurs du temps jadis, François Villon speaks of the traditional theme, in poetry, of the tempus fugit, that is to say of time which flees, as well as of ubi sunt, that is to say of the question: "Where are they?", evoking the deceased of a distant past.

The translation of the title of the book Gone with the Wind by Margaret Mitchell into Autant en emporte le vent was found by the publisher Jean Paulhan in the refrain of this Ballade en vieil langage françoys.

== Shape ==
It is a ballad, a frequent form in Villon's work. Using the octosyllable, it obeys the following rules of composition :

- three eighths followed by a quatrain named dispatch;
- three rhymes in A, B and C;
- the rhymes are arranged in ABABBCBC in the eights and in BCBC in the dispatch.

== Text and transcript ==
Here is the text, its transcription in modern French and in English :

Original	Modern French translation	English Translation
Car, ou soit ly sains apostolles, D'aubes vestuz, d'amys coeffez, Qui ne saint fors saintes estolles Dont par le col prent ly mauffez, De mal talant tout eschauffez, Aussi bien meurt que cilz servans, De ceste vie cy brassez : Autant en emporte ly vens ! Voire, ou soit de Constantinobles L'emperieres au poing dorez, Ou de France ly roy tres nobles Sur tous autres roys decorez, Qui, pour ly grant Dieux adorez, Batist eglises et couvens, S'en son temps il fut honnorez, Autant en emporte ly vens ! Ou soit de Vienne et de Grenobles Ly Daulphin, ly preux, ly senez, Ou de Digons, Salins et Dolles, Ly sires et ly filz esnez, Ou autant de leurs gens prenez, Heraux, trompectes, poursuivans, Ont ils bien boutez soubz le nez ? Autant en emporte ly vens ! ENVOI Princes à mort sont tous destinez, Et tous autres qui sont vivans; Si sont courcez n'attinez, Autant en emporte ly vens !...	Car, de même, le saint apôtre, De l'aube revêtu, de l'amict coiffé, Qui ne ceint que la sainte étole, Avec laquelle, par le col, il prend le Mauvais, De colère tout échauffé, Au bien meurt que fils, servants, Hors de cette vie-ci soufflé. Autant en emporte le vent ! Et même, à Constantinople L'empereur au poing doré, Ou le très noble roi de France, Plus glorieux que tous les autres rois, Qui, pour honorer la grandeur divine, A fait bâtir églises et couvents, S'il fut honoré à son époque, Autant en emporte le vent ! Ou, à Vienne et Grenoble Le Dauphin, le vaillant, le sage, Ou, à Dijon, Salins et Dole, Le seigneur et le fils aîné, Aussi bien que leurs amis, Hérauts, trompettes, poursuivants, Ont-ils bien rempli leur bouche ? Autant en emporte le vent ! ENVOI Les princes sont tous destinés à la mort, Et tous les autres, qui sont vivants : Qu'ils s'en affligent ou s'en irritent, Autant en emporte le vent !...	For whether they’re apostolic saints, fitted with haloes, loved by all, whose virtues by no evil taints could be dragged out of them, nor fall into whatever kind of sin - like serving lads they have their day, torn from the only life they’re in: they’re carried by the wind away. It no more matters if they be gold-fingered Emperors of Constantinople or of all kings of France the apogee, the one most honoured and most noble, who built, to show his love of Heaven, convent and church in which to pray, so that his age worshipped him even: they’re carried by the wind away. Or be it Dauphins of Vienne or of Grenoble, mighty, venerable, Dijon, Salines and Doles, great men, fathers and elder sons, all able; or it may be their private staff - heralds, flutes, those who trumpets play: haven’t they fed well, had much to quaff ? They’re carried by the wind away. DISPATCH Princes to death, too, are foredoomed: with all things living it holds sway; whether they’re ready, once it’s loomed they’re carried by the wind away.
