= Prins Heinrichfjella =

Coordinates: 78.672°N 12.163°E

Prins Heinrichfjella is a mountain range in Oscar II Land at Spitsbergen, Svalbard. It is named after Prince Henry of Prussia. The mountain range is located between Aavatsmarkbreen and Elisebreen. Among the mountains in the range are Hildtoppen, Prinsen, Brattskarvet, Prinsesseryggen, Bolken, Skarpryggen and Istappane. The summits vary from 344 to 932 m.a.s.l.
