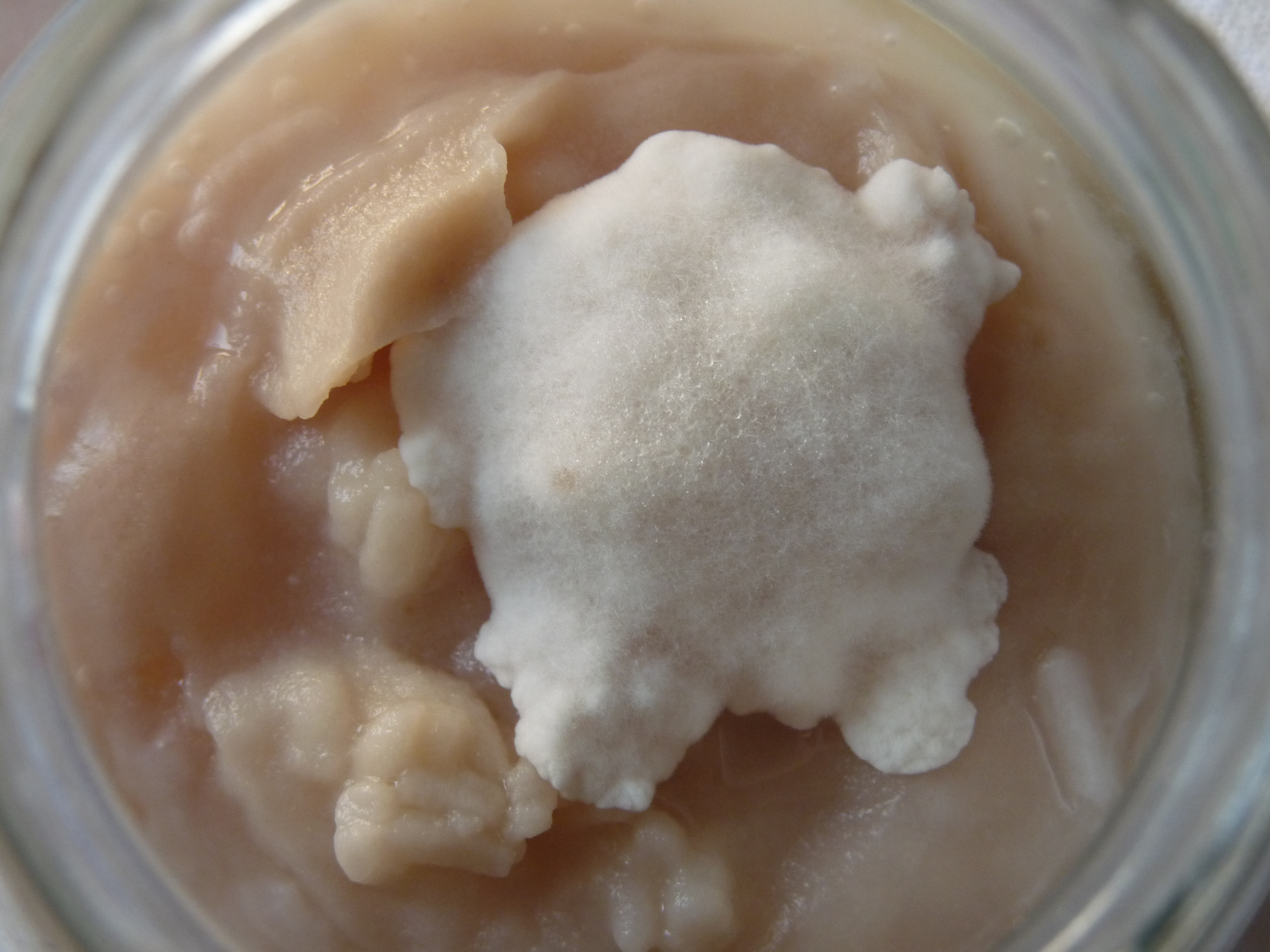

Scientific classification
- Kingdom: Fungi
- Division: Mucoromycota
- Class: Mucoromycetes
- Order: Mucorales
- Family: Mucoraceae
- Genus: Rhizopus
- Species: R. oryzae

Binomial name
- Rhizopus oryzae Went & H.C. Prinsen Geerligs, (1895)

Synonyms
- Rhizopus arrhizus A. Fisch., (1892); Rhizopus stolonifer Vuillemin, (1902); Rhizopus japonicus Vuill. (1902); Rhizopus nodosus Namsyl. (1906); Rhizopus nodosus Hanzawa (1912)

= Rhizopus oryzae =

Species of fungus

Rhizopus oryzae is a filamentous heterothallic microfungus that occurs as a saprotroph in soil, dung, and rotting vegetation. This species is very similar to Rhizopus stolonifer, but it can be distinguished by its smaller sporangia and air-dispersed sporangiospores. It differs from R. oligosporus and R. microsporus by its larger columellae and sporangiospores. The many strains of R. oryzae produce a wide range of enzymes such as carbohydrate digesting enzymes and polymers along with a number of organic acids, ethanol and esters giving it useful properties within the food industries, bio-diesel production, and pharmaceutical industries. It is also an opportunistic pathogen of humans causing mucormycosis.

== History and taxonomy ==
Rhizopus oryzae was discovered by Frits Went and Hendrik Coenraad Prinsen Geerligs in 1895. The genus Rhizopus (family Mucoraceae) was erected in 1821 by the German mycologist, Christian Gottfried Ehrenberg to accommodate Mucor stolonifer and Rhizopus nigricans as distinct from the genus Mucor. The genus Rhizopus is characterized by having stolons, rhizoids, sporangiophores sprouting from the points of which rhizoids were attached, globose sporangia with columellae, striated sporangiospores. In the mid 1960s, researchers divided the genus based on temperature tolerance. Numerical methods were later used in the early 1970s where researchers arrived at similar conclusions. R. oryzae was relegated to a distinct section because it grew well at 37 °C but failed to grow at 45 °C. In the past, strains were identified through isolating active components of the species that were commonly found in food and alcoholic drinks in Indonesia, China, and Japan. There are approximately 30 synonyms, the most common being R. arrhizus. Scholer popularized R. oryzae because he thought R. arrhizus represented an extreme form of R. oryzae.

== Growth and morphology ==
Rhizopus oryzae grows quickly in optimal temperatures, at 1.6 mm per hour (nearly 0.5 μm per second - enough to be able to directly visualize hyphal elongation in real-time under the microscope). R. oryzae can grow in temperature of 7 °C to 44 °C and the optimum growth temperature is 37 °C. There is very poor growth from 10 °C to 15 °C and negligible growth at 45 °C. There is substantial growth in media containing 1% NaCl, very poor growth at 3% NaCl, and none at 5% NaCl. R. oryzae favors slightly acidic media. Good growth is observed at a pH of 6.8; in the range of 7.7-8.1, there is very poor growth. Most amino acids—with the exception of L-valine—promote R. oryzae growth, with L-tryptophan and L-tyrosine being the most effective. It also grows well on mineral nitrogen sources, except nitrate, and can utilize urea.

Rhizopus oryzae has variable sporangiosphores. They can be straight or curved, swollen or branched, and the walls can be smooth or slightly rough. The colour of sporangiosphores range from pale brown to brown. Sporangiosphores grow between 210-2500 μm in length and 5-18 μm in diameter. The sporangia in R. oryzae are globose or subglobose, wall spinous and black when mature, 60-180 μm in diameter. They can be distinguishable from Rhizopus stolonifer as they have smaller sporangia and spores. The optimal conditions for sporangium production are temperatures between 30 °C to 35 °C and low water levels. Sporulation is stimulated by amino acids (except L-valine) when grown in light, while in darkness only L-tryptophan and L-methionine effect stimulation of growth. The columellae are globose, subglobose, or oval in shape. The wall is usually smooth and the colour is pale brown. The average diameter growth ranges from 30-110 μm. Sporangiospores are elliptical, globose, or polygonal, they are striated and grow 5-8 μm in length. Dormant and germinated sporangiospores show deep furrows and prominent ridges with a pattern that makes it distinguishable from that of R. stolonifer. The germination of sporangiospores can be induced by the combined action of L-proline and phosphate ions. L-ornithine, L-arginine, D-glucose and D-mannose are also effective. Optimal germination occurs on media containing D-glucose and mineral salts.R. oryzae has abundant, root-shaped rhizoids. Zygospores are produced by diploid cells when sexual reproduction occurs under nutrient poor conditions. They have colors that range from red to brown, they are spherical or laterally flattened, and ranges from 60-140μm in size. In high nutrient levels, R. oryzae reproduces asexually, producing azygospores. The stolons found in R. oryzae are smooth or slightly rough, almost colorless or pale brown, 5-18 μm in diameter. The chlamydospores are abundant, globose ranging in 10-24 μm in diameter, elliptical, and cylindrical. Colonies of R. oryzae are white initially, becoming brownish with age and can grow to about 1 cm thick.

== Habitat and ecology ==
Rhizopus oryzae can be found in various soils across the world. For example, it has been found in India, Pakistan, New Guinea, Taiwan, Central America, Peru, Argentina, Namibia, South Africa, Iraq, Somalia, Egypt, Libya, Tunisia, Israel, Turkey, Spain, Italy, Hungary, Czech Republic, Slovakia, Germany, Ukraine, British Isles, and the USA. The soils where R. oryzae has been isolated are varied ranging from grassland, cultivated soils under lupin, corn, wheat, groundnuts, other legumes, sugar canes, rice, citrus plantations, steppe type vegetation, alkaline soils, salt-marshes, farm manure soils, to sewage filled soils. The pH of the soils where the species has been isolated typically range from 6.3 to 7.2.

Rhizopus oryzae is often identified as R. arrhizus when isolated from foods. It is found in rotting fruits and vegetables where it is often called R. stolonifer. Unlike the other species such as R. stolonifer, R. oryzae is common in tropical conditions. In East Asia, it is common in peanuts. For instance, there was 21% isolation from peanut kernels from Indonesia. It is present in maize, beans, sorghum, and cowpeas, pecans, hazelnuts, pistachios, wheat, barley, potatoes, sapodillas, and various other tropical foods. Maize meal on which isolates of R. oryzae had been grown was found to be toxic to ducklings and rats, causing growth depression.

== Pathogenicity ==
Rhizopus oryzae is one of the most common causes of a disease known as mucormycosis, characterized by growing hyphae within and surrounding blood vessels. The causal agents of mucormycosis may also produce toxins like agroclavine which is toxic to humans, sheep and cattle. This infection usually occurs in immunocompromised individuals but is rare. Common risk factors associated with primary cutaneous mucormycosis is ketoacidosis, neutropenia, acute lymphobloastic leukemia, lymphomas, systemic steroids, chemotherapy, and dialysis. Treatment includes amphotericin B, posaconazole, itraconazole, and fluconazole. The majority of the cases of infection are rhinocerebral infections. At the same time, it has been found in literature that R. oryzae can produce antibiotic activity on some bacteria.

The pathogenicity towards plants is attributed to the presence of large number of carbohydrate digesting enzymes.

== Physiology and industrial uses ==
Rhizopus oryzae is involved in steroid transformations and it produces 4-desmethyl steroids which has been useful in the fermentation industry. The carbon sources does influence the ratio of polar and neutral lipids. The mycelium found in R. oryzae contains lipids and the highest lipid content occurs when grown on fructose. The highest unsaturated fatty acid content is observed at 30 °C and lowest at 15 °C. Proteolytic properties have been observed well under the conditions of pH 7 at 35 °C. Pyridozine and thiamine prefer proteinase production. R. oryzae can degrade aflatoxin A_{1} to isomeric hydroxy compounds and aflatoxin G_{1} to fluorescent metabolite aflatoxin A_{1}. There are various factors that influence the production of dextro-lactic acids, fumaric acid, and metabolism of R. oryzae. For examples, in 40 °C there is more favorable growth for glucose consumption, however this influenced production of d-lactic acid production negatively. Glucose concentration of 15% is needed for optimal production of d-lactic acid. Fumaric acid production was suppressed in media containing more than 6 grams of NH_{4}NO_{3} per liter and is favorable to d-lactic acid production.

Rhizopus oryzae is considered GRAS by the FDA and thus recognized as safe to use industrially as it can consume a range of carbon sources. During fermentation. R. oryzae produce amylase, lipase, and protease activity to increase nutrient's ability to use many compounds as an energy and carbon source. Historically, it has been used in fermentation, specifically to ferment soybean and create tempeh in Malaysia and Indonesia. Using the same methods to create traditional tempeh, R. oryzae can be inoculated in other cooked legumes such as peas, beans, and fava beans. Similarly in tempeh making, there is an initial bacterial fermentation in legumes when they are soaked for a while before being cooked. Fermentation incubation lasts for 48 hours at 33 °C. After incubation, mycelium can be observed between the legumes creating a larger, uniform product. Overall, fruits, grains, nuts, and legumes mold-fermentation with R. oryzae produces sensory changes in foods such as creating acidity, sweetness and bitterness. R. oryzae can produce lactate from glucose at high levels, which is used as a food additive and can also degrade plastics. In enzyme-modified cheese products, R. oryzae provides microbial enzymes where milk fat and proteins are broken down to create powder and paste forms of cheese. Specifically, it breaks down cheese curds and acid casein.

Among finding cellulases and hemicellulases, other enzymes such as protease, urease, ribonuclease, pectate lyase, and polygalacturonase are found in cultural media of R. oryzae. Besides producing a number of enzymes, it can also produce a number of organic acids, alcohol, and esters. Cellulases in R. oryzae can be applied to biotechnology, in food, brewery and wine, animal feed, textiles and laundry, pulp and paper industries, and agriculture. R. oryzae can convert both glucose and xylose under aerobic conditions into pure L (+)-lactic acids with by-products such as xylitol, glycerol, ethanol, carbon dioxide and fungal biomass. Endo-xylanase is a key enzyme for xylan depolymerization and was produced by R. oryzae fermentation from different xylan-containing agricultural by-products such as wheat straw, wheat stems, cottons bagasse, hazelnut shells, corn cobs, and oat sawdust. Pectinases are required for extraction and clarification of fruit juices and wines, extraction of oils, flavors and pigmentation from plant material, preparation of cellulose fibers for linen, jute and hemp manufacture as well as, coffee and tea fermentations.

R. oryzae can break down starch content in rice plants and therefore shows amylolytic activities. Also, it has been reported to produce extra cellular isoamylase which is used in food industries. Isoamylase was found to saccharify potato starch, arrow root, tamarind kernel, tapioca, and oat. The saccharifying ability of the enzyme is highly applicable in sugar production industries. Proteases, which can be found in R. oryzae are highly useful in commercial industries. For instance, it has increased application in food, pharmaceutical, detergent, leather, tanning industries. It is also involved in silver recovery and peptide synthesis. One strain of R. oryzae was found to secrete alkaline serine protease which shows high pH stability within 3 to 6 and poor thermos-stability. Lipase that is extracted from R. oryzae have been consumed as digestive aids without adverse reactions. Lipases hydrolyze fats and oils with subsequent release of free fatty acids such as diacylglycerols, monoacylglycerols and glycerol. Lipases have been involved in biotechnology applications because of its ability to catalyze synthetic reactions in non-aqueous solutions. One study has reported the expression of a fungal 11 alpha-steroid hydroxylase from R. oryzae which can be used to perform the 11 alpha-hydroxylation of the steroid skeleton which has simplified steroid drug production.R. oryzae can produce intracellular ribonuclease in a metal ion-regulated liquid medium with the addition of calcium and molybdenum stimulating ribonuclease production. R. oryzae strain ENHE isolated from contaminated soil was found to be capable of tolerating and removing pentachlorophenol.

R. oryzae is known to produce L (+)-lactic acid because the fungus cells possess better resistance to high concentration of accumulated lactic acid and lower content of nutrient requirement compared to the commonly used bacterial procedures. Thus, R. oryzae is the most efficient approached to improve lactic acid production process that facilitates multiple reuses of fungal cells for long-term lactic acid production. Ethanol is the main by-product in the fermentation process of R. oryzae during the production of L-lactic acid. R. oryzae can be used as a biocatalyst for ester production in organic solvent. Dry mycelium of four R. oryzae strains proved effective for catalysing the synthesis of different flavor esters. For example, the pineapple flavour or butyl acetate esters was produced by the esterification reactions between acetic acid and butanol by R. oryzae. This flavor compound can be used in food, cosmetic and pharmaceutical industries. Within the biodiesel industry, biodiesel fuel as fatty acid methyl ester is produced by the esterification of plant oil or animal fat with methanol. This is a renewable fuel resource compared to the traditional petroleum-based fuels. Production of biodiesel fuel from plant oils from cells of R. oryzae immobilized within biomass support particles were investigated for the methanolysis of soybean oil. Olive oil or oleic acid was found to be effective for enhancing methanolysis activity which is a promising results within the biodiesel industry.

R. oryzae has been investigated as a bioremediation agent fluoride sequestrant.
