= Prinsen Geerligs =

Prinsen Geerligs is a Dutch surname and may refer to:

- H.C. Prinsen Geerligs (1864–1953), Dutch chemist
- Hugo Prinsen Geerligs (born 1973), Dutch bassist
- Reina Prinsen Geerligs (1922–1943), Dutch resistance fighter
