= Johann de Waal =

- Born: 1958 (age 67–68); Eldoret, Kenya
- Occupations: Journalist, writer
- Writing career
- Notable works: Machadospoor !Sit Oom Paul

Johann de Waal (born 1958) is an Afrikaans writer.

== Life and work ==
Johann de Waal was born in 1958 in Eldoret, Kenya. The author Eduard H. De Waal is his older brother. In 1962 the family moved to South Africa and he went to school in Eshowe and Rustenburg, where he matriculated in 1976. He continued his studies at the University of Pretoria, where he actively contributed to the magazine Vlieg, and Johann de Lange, Johann Lodewyk Marais, Koos Prinsloo, Hans Pienaar and Victor Munnik were among his contemporaries. After university he taught school for two years. On 12 November 1983, he married the author Andrée Bosch, daughter of the famous ceramic artist Esias Bosch, in White River. The couple have two daughters, Leandra and Lisa. After the wedding, he and his wife lived in London for a few years. On their return to South Africa, he worked as a journalist for the Pretoria News for a while before moving to White River, where he first taught English at the Elijah Mango College of Education but later became a furniture maker. In 1989 he founded Johann De Waal Furniture, which successfully markets three brands (De Waal Furniture, African Loom and Mirage) to hotels, clubs and corporate companies in particular. His marriage to his wife broke down towards the end of 1999 and they subsequently divorced.

== Writing Work ==
Initially he wrote poetry and a number of his poems were published in magazines such as Tydskrif vir Letterkunde and Standpunte. He later focused mainly on prose and while in London in 1985 he completed his first novel. However, this novel was not published. "Slaapvraat en Leander" is a book for toddlers in which Leander is protected from dangers and bad dreams by Slaapvraat, a creature smaller than a bear but larger than a cat. The book is also translated into English as "Bedbear and Leander".

“Machadospoor" is a novel for adults about violence on the border, seen from the perspective of Inspector Du Toit, the oppressor but also the victim. The inspector investigates the deaths of the stationmaster and the rough forest worker Steyn's wife, both of whom are found trampled to death on the train tracks. There are no conventional clues, only a thrilling search amidst an exploration of the self caught in the web of personal and social violence. As the investigation continues, the problem deepens. The title refers to the train that steams along its track without the possibility of changing course. This book was nominated for the Rapport Prize in 1990. He himself translated this novel into English, which is published by Penguin as "Machado".

In 1996, "!Sit Oom Paul" was honourably mentioned when the C.N.A. Prize for young people's books was awarded. This book deals with the recent history of the Afrikaner in an innovative way by also including aspects such as teenage sex across the colour divide, prostitution and rebellion against the Protestant faith. The main character Herman Human struggles with the growing up issues of teenage relationships, catcalling, adults’ dishonesty, hypocrisy, discrimination and favouritism towards other pupils and he becomes more and more rebellious. However, his father's example helps him to choose what is right and not simply correct and that one must choose with one's conscience, even if it is to one's immediate disadvantage. The title of the book refers to the student injustice that rebellious students do to the symbol of Afrikanerdom, Oom Paul, by painting footprints for him straight to the Royal Hotel's bar and then snaking back.

Together with his wife, he is also writing a book about her artist father, "Esias Bosch".

== Publications ==
Year	Publications
1987	Slaapvraat en Leander
1988	Esias Bosch (saam met Andrée Bosch)
1991	Machadospoor
1995	!Sit Oom Paul

== Sources ==
=== Books ===
- Kannemeyer, J.C. "Die Afrikaanse literatuur 1652–2004" Human & Rousseau Kaapstad en Pretoria Eerste uitgawe 2005
- Wybenga, Gretel en Snyman, Maritha (reds.) "Van Patrys-hulle tot Hanna Hoekom" Lapa-Uitgewers Eerste uitgawe Tweede druk 2005
- Tydskrifte en koerante
- Krige, Lisel "Skrynwerker van die woord" “De Kat" Mei 1991
- Pretorius, Willem "Vir De Waal tel gevoel, eerder as sêgoed" “Die Burger" 8 Junie 1991

=== Internet ===
- LitNet ATKV-Skrywersalbum 20 Januarie 2012: www.litnet.co.za
- Nieuwoudt, Stephanie Beeld: http://152.111.1.88/argief/berigte/beeld/1995/11/7/999/2.html
- Pretorius, Willem Die Burger: http://152.111.1.87/argief/berigte/dieburger/1991/06/08/7/7.html
- Storiewerf: http://www.storiewerf.co.za/cvs/cv_johandewaal_ph.htm
- Worldcat: http://www.worldcat.org/identities/lccn-n88181792/
