= Nicolaus Copernicus University Polar Station =

- Research station
- Location in Svalbard
- Coordinates: 78°41′10″N 11°51′40″E
- Country: Poland
- Established: 1975
- Named for: Nicolaus Copernicus

Government
  - Type: Scientific institution
  - Body: Nicolaus Copernicus University in Toruń

The Nicolaus Copernicus University Polar Station (Stacja Polarna Uniwersytetu Mikołaja Kopernika na Spitsbergenie) is a Polish research station in north-western Spitsbergen.

It is located in the northern part of the Kaffiøyra close to Aavatsmarkbreen and has operated since 1975. It was opened by the Nicolaus Copernicus University in Toruń and named after Nicolaus Copernicus.

The station has been used by 13 expeditions and 70 people. In its 30-year existence the station has been visited by about 300 people.

The Nicolaus Copernicus University Polar Station is the second northernmost Polish scientific institution.

== See also ==
- List of research stations in the Arctic
