= Peter Blum =

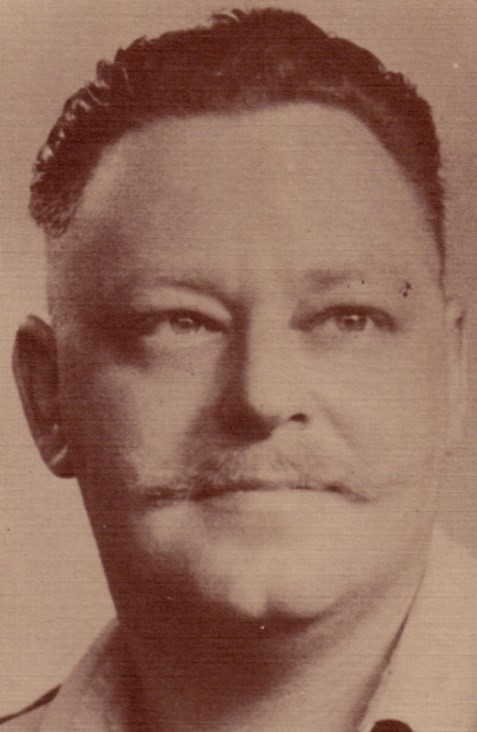
- Born: Peter Emil Julius Blum; 19 August 1926; Trieste, Kingdom of Italy
- Died: 5 December 1990 (aged 65); London, England, UK
- Occupation: Poet
- Writing career
- Period: 1955-1958
- Notable awards: Reina Geerlig Prinsen Prys (1956)

Peter Emil Julius Blum (4 May 1925 – 5 December 1990) was an Afrikaans poet. As a child, he emigrated to the Union of South Africa with his family. From an early age Blum was already able to speak several languages, including German and Italian.

After studying literature at the University of Cape Town and at the University of Stellenbosch, he took up a position as a librarian in Cape Town and, later, in Kroonstad in the Orange Free State. Blum married Henrietta Cecilia Smit (born 3 November 1911, died 2002 in Worthing, Sussex, UK), a South African art teacher, in 1955.

His success as a poet was first affirmed in 1956 when he won the Reina Prinsen Geerligs Prize for his volume Steenbok tot poolsee (the title being a reference to the Tropic of Capricorn and the southern Antarctic Ocean, relating to the geographical location of South and Southern Africa).

Blum was twice denied South African citizenship. Kannemeyer (1993) speculates that citizenship was denied because of Blum's vociferous opposition to the ruling National Party's policy of apartheid.

Frustrated by this turn of events, Blum and his wife left South Africa to resettle in the suburb of Hounslow in London.

During his imprisonment between 1975 and 1982, Breyten Breytenbach wrote the poem, Ballade van ontroue bemindes ("Ballade of Unfaithful Lovers"). Inspired by François Villon's Ballade des Dames du Temps Jadis, Breytenbach compared Afrikaner dissidents Peter Blum, Ingrid Jonker, and himself to unfaithful lovers, who had betrayed Afrikaans poetry by taking leave of it.

Peter Blum died in London on 5 December 1990, aged 65.

== Works ==
- Steenbok tot poolsee (1955) Tafelberg: Cape Town. ISBN 978-0-624-01581-9
- Enklaves van die lig (1958) Human & Rousseau: Cape Town. ISBN 978-0-7981-3478-1

== Works about Peter Blum ==
- Kannemeyer, J.C. (1993) Wat het geword van Peter Blum? Tafelberg: Cape Town. ISBN 978-0-624-03196-3
- Kannemeyer, J.C. (2009) Briewe van Peter Blum Hemel en see Uitgewers: Hermanus. ISBN 978-0-620-42695-4
- Kannemeyer, J.C. (1983) Geskiedenis van die Afrikaanse Literatuur Band 2 H&R-Academica: Pretoria
