= Kaffiøyra =

Coastal plain of Spitsbergen, Norway

- Coastal plain
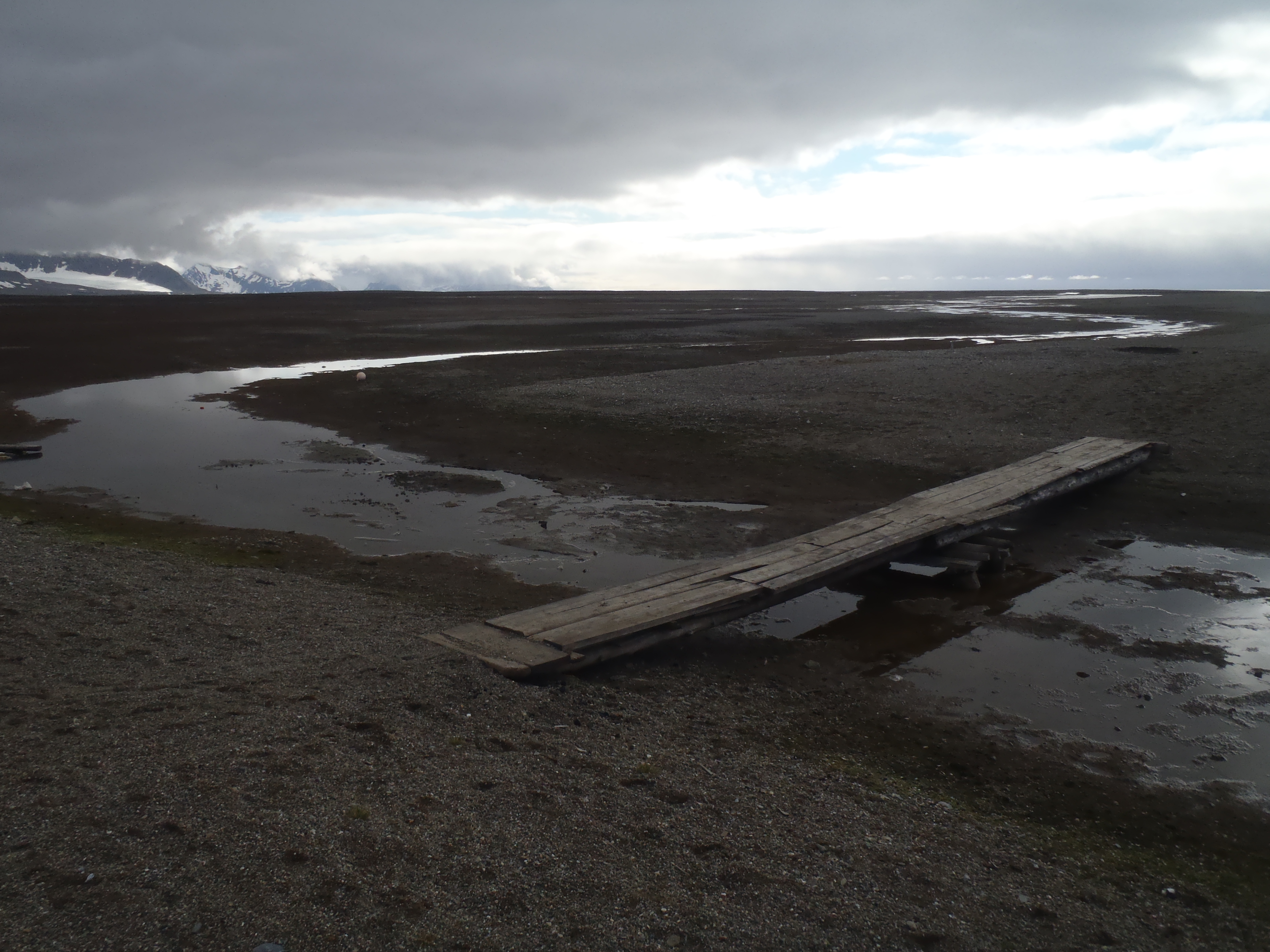
- Kaffiøyra viewed from the Nicolaus Copernicus University Polar Station

- Location in Svalbard
- Coordinates: 78.64°N 11.98°E
- Country: Norway
- Archipelago: Svalbard

Kaffiøyra (Coffee Plain) is a coastal plain in Oscar II Land at Spitsbergen, Svalbard.

The plain has a length of about thirteen kilometers, extending from Aavatsmarkbreen southwards to Oliverbreen. Kaffiøyra is crossed by several brooks originating from glaciers, including Øyrnesbekken which flows from Irenebreen to Øyrnes. Among headlands along the plain are Snipeodden, Øyrnes, Tjørnnes and Snippen.

The Nicolaus Copernicus University Polar Station, a base for research in climatology, glaciology, hydrology and geomorphology, is located in the northern part of the plain.
