= Reina Prinsen Geerligs =

Dutch writer and resistance fighter

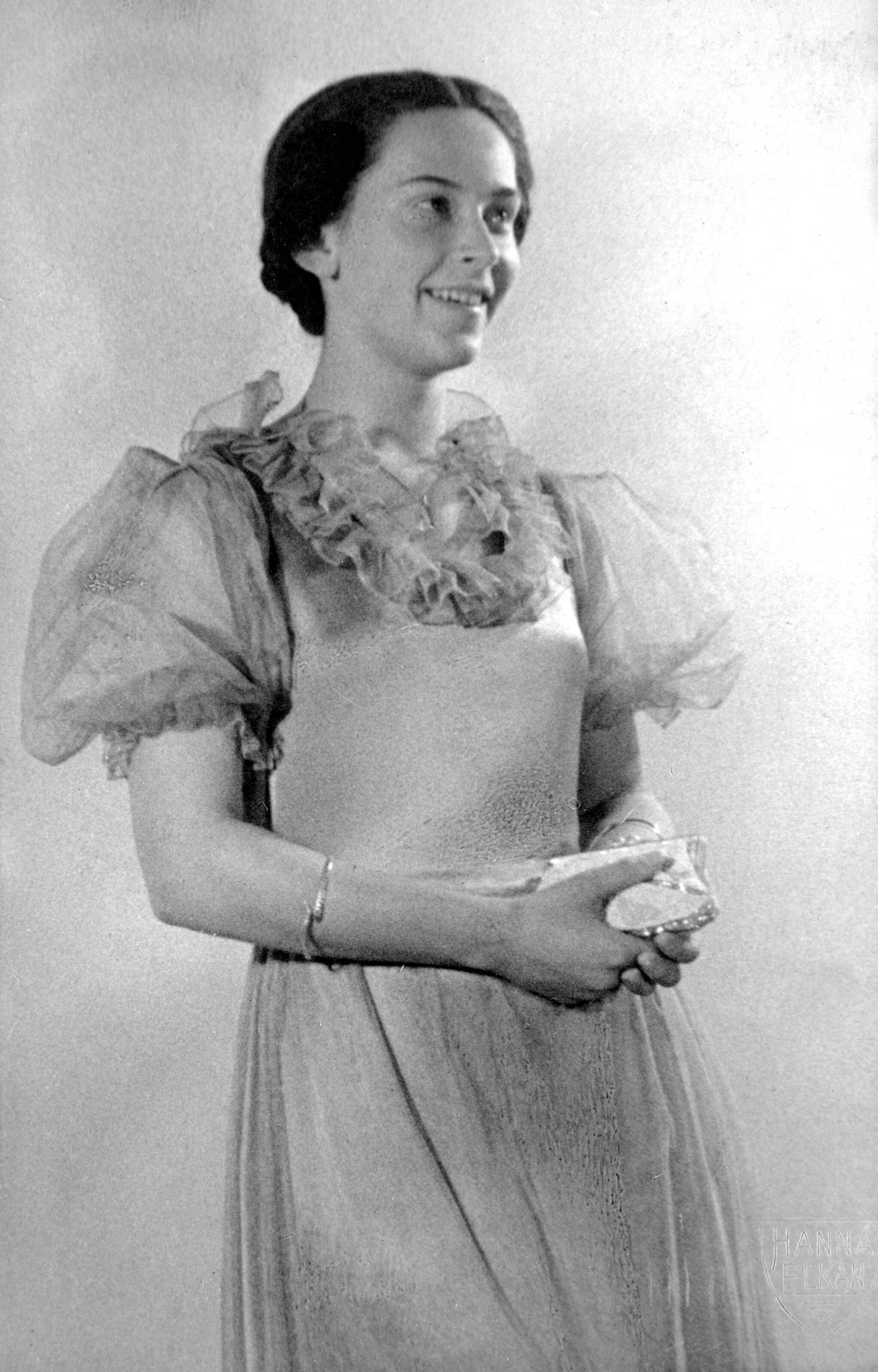
Portrait of Reina Prinsen-Geerligs in her first cocktail dress.

Reina Prinsen Geerligs (7 October 1922 - 24 November 1943) was a member of the Dutch Resistance during World War II. After the war the literary Reina Prinsen Geerligs Award was created in her memory.

== Biography ==
Reina Prinsen Geerligs was born in 1922 in Semarang, Dutch East Indies, the daughter of the chemist Johan Prinsen Geerligs (Note: Johan Prinsen Geerligs was the son of the sugar industry chemist H.C. Prinsen Geerligs) and his wife Helen Carolina Zon. She had a brother who was two years younger. They moved to Amsterdam when she was still very young.

In the Netherlands, Prinsen Geerligs was a member of the Youth Organisation for the Study of Nature, and she started writing poetry and prose. But when the war started, she mostly stopped writing and concentrated on her work with the resistance, initially mainly as a courier. Her house became the meeting place for resistance group CS-6, and Reina Prinsen Geerligs became involved with at least two assassination attempts. In 1943 she and Louis Boissevain tried to kill police officer Pieter Kaay, but stopped the attempt when they saw Kaay seated with a child in his lap. Another group executed him the next day.

Prinsen Geerligs was arrested on 23 July 1943, and confessed to her work as a resistance fighter. In November 1943 she and some other members of the resistance group were transported to Sachsenhausen concentration camp, where they were executed the next day.

=== Reina Prinsen Geerligs Award ===
Prinsen Geerligs' parents only learned of her death in 1946. With the money they had set apart to finance her studies, they created a fund for a literary award in her honour, the Reina Prinsen Geerligs Award. The prize was given to a young writer between the ages of 20 and 30, and was won by some of the most prominent Dutch writers at the start of their career, including Gerard Reve and Harry Mulisch. The initial prize was worth 350 Guilders and was open to Dutch and Flemish writers and in 1953, works in Afrikaans were allowed. It was last awarded in 1979.

- 1947: Gerard Reve
- 1948: Mies Bouhuys
- 1949: Willem Witkampf
- 1950: Jan Blokker
- 1951: Harry Mulisch
- 1952: Kees Stempels
- 1953: Remco Campert
- 1953: Ellen Warmond
- 1954: Henk Meijer
- 1955: W.G. Klooster
- 1956: Winny Pendèl
- 1959: J. Bernlef
- 1960: A.P. van Hoek
- 1961: Peter van Gestel
- 1962: Steven Membrecht
- 1964: Kees Holierhoek
- 1965: Henk van Kerkwijk
- 1967: Eddy van Vliet
- 1968: Hans Vlek
- 1970: Arie van den Berg
- 1972: Willem Jan Otten
- 1973: Frans Kusters
- 1976: Oek de Jong
- 1976: Jotie T'Hooft
- 1979: Leon de Winter

Afrikaans winners included:

- 1954: Ina Rousseau (Die verlate tuin)
- 1956: Peter Blum (Van Steenbok tot Poolsee)
- 1962: A.H. de Vries (Hoog teen die heuningkrans, Verlore erwe Vetkers en Neonlig)
- 1965: Andre Brink (Labola vir die lewe)
- 1968: Breyten Breytenbach (Die huis van die dowe)
- 1971: Fanie Olivier (Gom uit die sipres)
