= Prinsen =

Prinsen is a surname. Notable people with the surname include:

- François Prinsen (1905-?), Belgian sprinter
- Henk Prinsen (born 1951), Dutch racing cyclist
- Joost Prinsen (1942–2025), Dutch actor, television presenter, singer, and writer
- Lesmond Prinsen (born 1973), Dutch football player
- Tim Prinsen (born 1971), Canadian football player and coach
- Tom Prinsen (born 1982), Dutch long track speedskater
- Wim Prinsen (1945–1977), Dutch racing cyclist

== See also ==
- Prinsen Geerligs, another surname
