= John Christoffel Kannemeyer =

South African biographer

- Born: 31 March 1939; Robertson, Western Cape; South Africa
- Died: 25 December 2011 (aged 72); Stellenbosch; South Africa
- Occupations: literary historian, biographer
- Children: Anton Kannemeyer; Mark Kannemeyer

John Christoffel Kannemeyer, better known as J. C. Kannemeyer (31 March 1939 – 25 December 2011) was an authority on Afrikaans literature and a well-known biographer of Afrikaans writers, and published numerous books on the history of Afrikaans literature.

He was born in Robertson, Western Cape, South Africa.

== Bibliography ==
=== Biographies ===
- D. J. Opperman: 'n Biografie, Human & Rousseau, 1986
- Wat het geword van Peter Blum?, Tafelberg, 1993
- Die bonkige Zoeloelander, Tafelberg, 1994
- Opperman se lewe in beeld, Tafelberg, 1994
- Die dienswillige dienaar, Tafelberg, 1995
- Langenhoven: 'n Lewe, Tafelberg, 1995
- Leipoldt: 'n Lewensverhaal, Tafelberg, 1999
- Uit die skatkis van die slampamperman, Tafelberg, 1999
- So blomtuin-vol van kleure: Leipoldt oor Clanwilliam, Tafelberg, 1999
- Die lewe en werk van Uys Krige, Die goue seun, Tafelberg, 2002
- Uit die skatkis van die goue seun, Tafelberg, 2002
- Die naamlose muse (Uys Krige opstelle), Protea Boekhuis, 2002
- Jan Rabie: 'n Biografie, Tafelberg, 2004
- Hutspot (a collection of Rabie's scattered articles), T, 2004
- Die volledige versamelde gedigte van Eugène N. Marais, (editor), 2005
- Hannes Van Der Merwe: Argitek en skrywersvriend, Protea Boekhuis, 2006
- Eugène N. Marais, Die siel van die mier, Protea Boekhuis, 2007
- Leroux: 'n Lewe, Protea Boekhuis, 2008
- Briewe van Peter Blum, (Geredigeer en ingelei deur J C Kannemeyer), 2009
- J. M. Coetzee: 'n Geskryfde, Lewe Jonathan Ball Publishers SA, 2011

=== Literary Essays ===
- Opstelle oor die Afrikaanse drama, Academica, 1970
- Konfrontasies, Academica, 1977
- Getuigskrifte, Jutalit, 1989
- Die bevestigende vlam, Jutalit, 1990
- Ontsyferde stene, Inset, 1996
- Uit puur verstrooiing, 2007

== Awards ==
- 1979: Recht Malan Prize for Geskiedenis van die Afrikaanse literatuur I
- 1987: Old Mutual Prize for Non fiction for D. J. Opperman
- 1988: Gustav Preller Prize for Literêre Kritiek
- 1996: Recht Malan Prize for Langenhoven: 'n Lewe
- 2000: Recht Malan Prize and Helgaard Steyn Prize for Leipoldt: 'n Lewensverhaal
- C. Louis Leipoldt Prize of the Maatschappij der Nederlandse letterkunde for Uys Krige en die Suid-Afrikaanse politiek
- 2003: N.P. van Wyk Louw Medal
- 2009 Dr. honoris causa, Stellenbosch University
