= Johann de Lange =

South African poet and author (1959–2025)

- Born: Daniël Johannes de Lange; 22 December 1959; Pretoria, South Africa
- Died: 27 March 2025 (aged 65)
- Occupations: Poet, writer, critic

Johann de Lange (22 December 1959 – 27 March 2025) was a South African Afrikaans poet, short story writer and critic.

== Life and career ==
De Lange debuted in 1982 with a collection of poetry titled Akwarelle van die dors ("Aquarelles of thirst") for which he was awarded the Ingrid Jonker prize in 1983. This was followed by Waterwoestyn ("Water desert") in 1984, Snel grys fantoom ("Quick grey phantom") in 1986, Wordende naak ("Changing") in 1988 which was awarded the Rapport Prize for Poetry, Nagsweet ("Nightsweat") in 1990, Vleiswond ("Flesh wound") in 1993 and Wat sag is vergaan ("That which is soft perishes") in 1995.

After a silence of 13 years, he published a new volume of poetry Die algebra van nood ("The algebra of need") in 2009, which was awarded the Hertzog Prize for Poetry in 2011. In 2010, a selection from his poetry was published under the title Judasoog ("Judas eye").

In 1996, he published his first collection of short stories titled Vreemder as fiksie ("Stranger than fiction"), followed by Tweede natuur ("Second nature") in 2000 in which he explores the drug subculture.

In 1997, he edited an anthology of short stories titled Soort soek soort ("Birds of a feather"), covering 100 years of gay fiction in Afrikaans, and in 1998 an anthology of Afrikaans erotic poetry in collaboration with Antjie Krog titled Die dye trek die dye aan ("Thighs attracting thighs"). In 2010, he compiled a selection of poems by Afrikaans poet Lina Spies, titled Die skyn van tuiskoms ("Semblance of a homecoming"), and in 2011 a selection from the poetry of Wilhelm Knobel titled As die woorde begin droom ("When the words start dreaming").

De Lange was also awarded the Pankrator prize for his poem Skerpskutter in an international poetry competition organised by UNESCO, as well as an Avanti award for his documentary script on the life of Ingrid Jonker Verdrinkte hande ("Drowning hands”). He was one of six poets to win the 2021 South African Literary Award for Poetry, but he declined the award.

He had translated poetry by Wilma Stockenström, Sheila Cussons, Antjie Krog, Lucas Malan & Ernst van Heerden amongst others into English. A great number of these translations has since been published in local and overseas collections and anthologies like The Penguin book of Southern African Verse (1989), Breaking the silence – a century of South African women’s poetry (1990), Soho Square: a collection of new writing from Africa (1992), The heart in exile: South African poetry in English 1990-1995 (1996) and The lava of this land: South African Poetry 1960-1996 (1997).

De Lange died on 27 March 2025, at the age of 65.

== Volumes of poetry ==
- Akwarelle van die dors (1982) ("Aquarelles of thirst")
- Waterwoestyn (1984) ("Water desert")
- Snel grys fantoom (1986) ("Quick grey phantom")
- Wordende naak (1990) ("Changing")
- Nagsweet (1991) ("Night sweat")
- Vleiswond (1993) ("Flesh wound")
- Wat sag is vergaan (1995) ("That which is soft perishes")
- Die algebra van nood (2009) ("The algebra of need")
- Judasoog: 'n seleksie (2010) ("Judas eye: Selected poems")
- Weerlig van die ongeloof (2011) ("Lightning of disbelief")
- Vaarwel my effens bevlekte held (2012) ("Farewell, my slightly tarnished hero")
- Stil punt van die aarde (2014) ("Still point of the earth")
- 'n Hunkering se grein (2016) ("The grain of longing")
- Die meeste sterre is lankal dood (2020) ("Most stars are already dead")
- Duimnaelsketse (2020) ("Thumbnail sketches")

== Short fiction ==
- Vreemder as fiksie (1996) ("Stranger than fiction")
- Tweede natuur (2000) ("Second nature", a graphic exploration of the drug culture)

== Anthologies ==
- Soort soek soort (1997) ("Birds of a feather", an anthology of gay short fiction in Afrikaans covering 100 years)
- Die dye trek die dye aan (1998) ("Thighs attract thighs", anthology of erotic poetry in Afrikaans, compiled in collaboration with well-known author Antjie Krog)
- Die skyn van tuiskoms: 'n keur uit die poësie van Lina Spies (2010)
- As die woorde begin droom: 'n keur uit die poësie van Wilhelm Knobel (2011)
- Oopkardoes: boertige ryme van Hennie Aucamp (2020)

== Translations ==
- The wisdom of water (2007) (A selection of translations from the oeuvre of Wilma Stockenström, one of Afrikaans' foremost poets)

== Autobiographical ==
- Gulp (2017) ("Fly" - Diaries 1993-1999)
