= Hennie Aucamp =

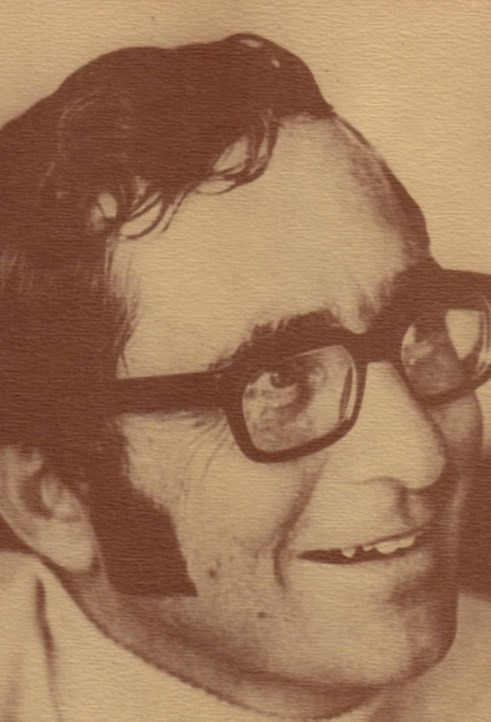
- Born: 20 January 1934; Dordrecht, Eastern Cape, South Africa
- Died: 20 March 2014 (aged 80); Cape Town, Western Cape, South Africa
- Education: University of Stellenbosch
- Occupations: Academic, poet, playwright

Hennie Aucamp (20 January 1934 – 20 March 2014) was a South African Afrikaans poet, short story writer, cabaretist and academic. He grew up on a farm in the Stormberg highlands and matriculated at Jamestown, Eastern Cape before continuing his higher education at the University of Stellenbosch. He died in Cape Town at age 80 on 20 March 2014 after suffering a stroke.

== Works ==
=== Short stories ===
- Een somermiddag (1963)
- Die hartseerwals: verhale en sketse (1965)
- Spitsuur (1967)
- ’n Bruidsbed vir Tant Nonnie (1970)
- Hongerblom: vyf elegieë (1972)
- Wolwedans: 'n soort revue (1973)
- Dooierus (1976)
- Enkelvlug (1978)
- Volmink (1981)
- Vir vier stemme (1981) (Limited Edition of 25 copies)
- Wat bly oor van soene? (1986)
- Dalk gaan niks verlore nie en ander tekste (1992)
- Gewis is alles net ’n grap en ander stories (1994)
- Ook skaduwees laat spore (2000)
- 'n Vreemdeling op deurtog (2007)
- Die huis van die digter (2009)
- Proses (2009)

=== Poetry ===
- Die lewe is ’n grenshotel: ryme vir pop en kabaret (1977)
- Die blou uur: 50 cocktail-kwatryne (1984)
- Rampe in die ruigte: fabels vir almal (1996)
- Koerier: 69 opdrag- en ander kwatryne (1999)
- Lyflied: ’n keur uit sy liedtekste (1999)
- Hittegolf: wulpse sonnette met ’n nawoord (2002)
- Dryfhout: 40 verse (2005)
- Vlamsalmander (2008)
- Skulp: kwatryne (2014)

=== Cabaret texts and plays ===
- Papawerwyn en ander verbeeldings vir die verhoog (1980)
- Met permissie gesê: ’n kabaret (1980)
- Slegs vir almal: ’n kabaret oor selfsug (1986)
- By Felix en Madame en ander eenbedrywe (1987)
- Teen latenstyd: verdere lirieke 1980-1986 (1987)
- Sjampanje vir ontbyt: drie verwante eenbedrywe (1988)
- Punt in die wind: ’n komedie met drie bedrywe en ’n nadraai (1989)
- Brommer in die boord (1990)
- Dubbeldop: kabarettekste en –opstelle (1994)

=== Critique ===
- Kort voor lank: opstelle oor kortprosatekste (1978)
- Woorde wat wond: geleentheidstukke oor randkultuur (1984)
- Die blote storie: ’n werkboek vir kortverhaalskrywers (1986)
- Dagblad (1987)
- Die blote storie 2: ’n werkboek vir kortverhaalskrywers (1994)
- Windperd: opstelle oor kreatiewe skryf (1992)
- Beeltenis verbode: bespiegelinge oor egodokumente en biografieë (1998)

=== Travel writing ===
- Karnaatjie: reissketse en essays (1968)
- In lande ver vandaan: China – Tibet – Nepal: ’n toerjoernaal (2001)

=== Diaries ===
- Gekaapte tyd: ’n kladboek September 1994 – Maart 1995 (1996)
- Allersiele: ’n dagboek Mei 1995 – Februarie 1996 (1997)
- Skuinslig: ’n dagboek Maart 1996 – April 1997) (2003)
- In die vroegte: herinneringe en refleksies (2003)

=== Selections from own work ===
- In een kraal: ’n keuse uit die prosa van Hennie Aucamp (1978)
- Brandglas: ’n keuse uit sy verhale (1987)

=== Compilations ===
- ’n Baksel in die More: boerestories uit die Stormberge (1973)
- Hoorspelkeur; radiodramas deur Hennie Aucamp et al. (1983)
- Van hoogmoed tot traagheid, of, Die sewe doodsondes (1996)

=== Commemorative ===
- M.E.R. 100 (1975)
- ’n Boekreis ver (1991)
- Bly te kenne: ’n bundel portrette (2001)
- ’n Skrywer by sonsopkoms: Hennie Aucamp 70 (compiled by Lina Spies and Lucas Malan).

=== In translation ===
- House visits: a collection of short stories; translated by Ian Ferguson (2005)
- Brecht sing Afrikaans (1983) (with Arnold Blumer & ander)

=== Wit ===
- Kommerkrale: ’n AB-jap vir akoliete (1983)
- Pluk die dag: aforismes en ander puntighede (1994)

== Awards ==
- 1970 – Tafelbergprys
- 1974 – W.A. Hofmeyrprys
- 1980 – ATKV-prys vir Drama
- 1996 – Recht Malan Prize
- 1982 – Hertzogprys
- 1987 – Fleur du Cap-toneelprys
- 2004 – ATKV-Prestigetoekenning
- 2004 – Fleur du Cap-teaterprys vir lewenswerk en bydrae tot teater
- 2004 – Afrikaans Onbeperk Kanna vir Lewensbydrae
- 2004 – LitNet se Mont du Toit Kelder-wyngedigtekompetisie
- 2006 – Gustav Preller-prys vir Literatuurwetenskap
