= Theo W. Jandrell =

South African educator, poet, and songwriter

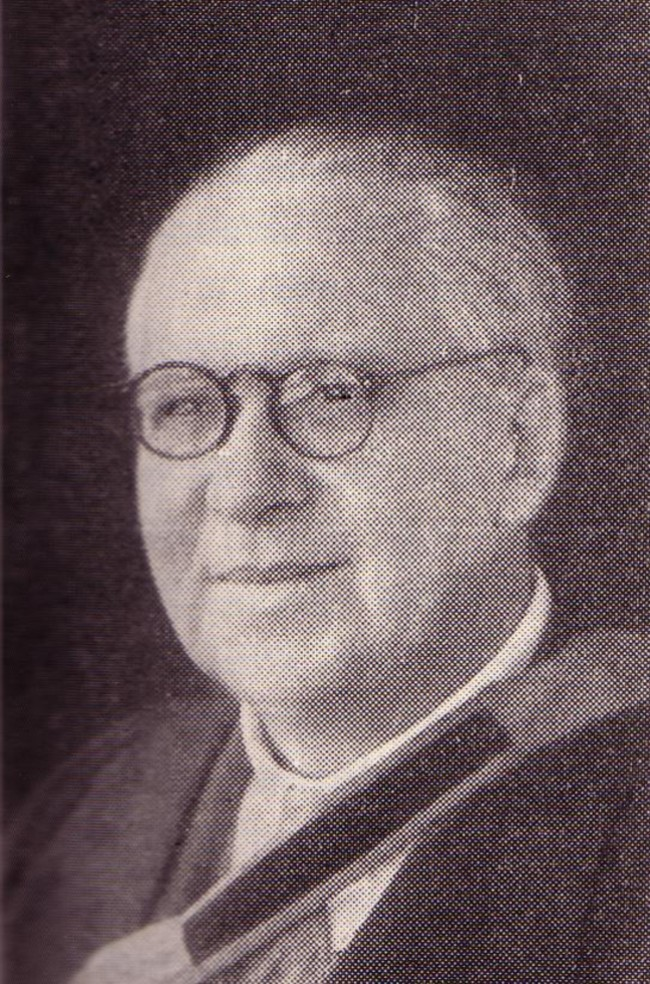
- Born: Theodore Walter Jandrell; August 1888; Richmond, Northern Cape
- Died: 1968 (79 or 80 years old)
- Occupation(s): Educationalist; Writer
- Notable work: FAK Volksangbundel

Theodore Walter Jandrell (also known as Theo W. Jandrell) (19 August 1888 in Richmond Northern Cape – 1968) was a South African teacher, principal of the Volksrust Primary School, educationist, schools inspector, and prolific Afrikaans poet and folksong writer.

Jandrell was a major contributor to the FAK Volksangbundel, a compendium of Afrikaans songs with music first published in 1937. His lyrics drew inspiration from songwriters such as Stephen Foster and traditional European and American melodies. His "Bolandse Nooi'ntjie" was based on Foster's "Beautiful Dreamer".

Bolandse nooi'ntjie, stil is die nag,
soet is jou rus na die lang, lange dag!
Saans in my drome kom ek na jou,
smagtend na lonkies uit oë so blou.
Berge en dale kan ons nooit skei,
want in die droomland ontmoet jy vir my.

== Publications ==
- "Kinders van die lig" Arranged and translated by Theo. W. Jandrell and Amy Catherine Walton (1956)
- "Moeder en Kind, en ander gediggies" - Theo W. Jandrell (1924)
- "Die Ou Murasie, en ander gediggies" - Theo W. Jandrell (1924)
- "Die dageraad liederbundel vir laerskole (standerds IV tot VI)" : 63 songs for piano - Hugo Gutsche, Theo W Jandrell
