= Lina Spies =

South African poet

- Born: 6 March 1939; Harrismith, North-Eastern Free State
- Occupations: Poet; Literary Critic; Academic; Translator

Carellina Pieternella (Lina) Spies (born 6 March 1939 in Harrismith, in North-Eastern Free State South Africa) is an Afrikaans poet and academic.

She received both the 1972 Eugène Marais Prize and 1972 Ingrid Jonker Prize, for her first volume of poetry, Digby vergenoeg. Her translation of Anne Frank's diaries was awarded the translation prize by the Suid-Afrikaanse Akademie vir Wetenskap en Kuns (South African Academy of Arts and Sciences).

Spies studied philosophy, languages and literature at Stellenbosch University, the Free University of Amsterdam and the University of Pretoria. She spent most of her career as a university lecturer, variously at the University of Port Elizabeth (now Nelson Mandela Metropolitan University), the University of Pretoria and Stellenbosch University. An authority on the work of Elisabeth Eybers, Martinus Nijhoff, D.J. Opperman and Hennie Aucamp, Spies was Professor of Afrikaans and Dutch Literature at Stellenbosch University between 1987 and her retirement in 1999. She still lives in the town of Stellenbosch.

On the occasion of her 75th birthday in 2013, the Stellenbosch Woordfees commissioned composer Hendrik Hofmeyr to write a song cycle on six of her poems. The resultant work, Die skaduwee van die son (The shadow of the sun) was first performed at the Woordfees by mezzo-soprano Minette du Toit-Pearce and Hendrik Hofmeyr on 10 March 2014. It has since been published in Germany by Edition Kemel and issued on CD in South Africa, performed by du Toit-Pearce and pianist Esthea Kruger.

== Volumes of poetry ==
- Digby Vergenoeg (1971)
- Winterhawe (1973)
- Dagreis (1976)
- Oorstaanson (1982)
- Van sjofar tot sjalom (1987)
- Hiermaals (1992)
- Die skaduwee van die son (1998)
- Duskant die einders (2004)
- Die skyn van tuiskoms (2010) - a selection from the poet's first 8 volumes of poetry, made by the poet Johann de Lange.
- Tydelose gety (2010)
- Sulamiet (2016)

== Non-Fiction ==
- Ontmoetings (1979)
- Kolonnade: ’n Studie van D.J. Opperman se bundels Heilige Beeste, Negester oor Ninevé en Komas uit ’n Bamboesstok binne verband van sy oeuvre (1992)
- Die enkel taak: Die merkwaardige verwantskap tussen Elisabeth Eybers en Emily Dickinson (1995)

== As translator ==
- Agterhuis: Die dagboek van Anne Frank (2008) (Translation into Afrikaans of Anne Frank's diaries.)
- Tirza (2014) (Translation into Afrikaans of Arnon Grunberg's novel.)

== As editor or compiler ==
- Majesteit, die kat: Verhale en gedigte oor katte (1998)
- Sy sien webbe roer: 'n Keuse uit die werk van Afrikaanse digteresse (1999)
- (with Lucas Malan) 'n Skrywer by sonsopkoms: Hennie Aucamp 70 (2004)

== Sources ==
- Bosman, M.E. (1989) 'Op Hom die Groot Hosannas: Enkele Aspekte van die Moderne Christelike Poësie in Afrikaans' PhD Thesis, Rhodes University.
- Britz, E.C. (1999) 'Lina Spies', in H.P. van Coller (ed.), Perspektief en Profiel: 'n Afrikaanse Literatuurgeskiedenis, Deel 2 Pretoria: J.L. van Schaik
- Britz, E.C. & van Niekerk, A. (2016) 'Lina Spies', in H.P. van Coller (ed.), Perspektief en Profiel: 'n Afrikaanse Literatuurgeskiedenis, Deel 3 Pretoria: J.L. van Schaik
- Eloff, L. (1984) 'Die Poësie van Lina Spies: 'n Oeuvrestudie' MA Thesis, Potchefstroom University
- Engelbrecht, G.C. (2012) 'Bybelse Intertekste in Resente Afrikaanse Gedigte en Lirieke, met Spesifieke Verwysing na Identiteitsformasies in die (Post-)Postmoderniteit' PhD Thesis, Stellenbosch University
- Kannemeyer, J.C. (1983) Geskiedenis van die Afrikaanse Literatuur, Band 2 Pretoria: H&R-Academica
- Spies, C.M. (2010) 'Die Agterhuis - Lina Spies se Vertaling van Anne Frank se Dagboek, Het Achterhuis, in Afrikaans: Besluite, Benaderings en Strategieë' MPhil Thesis, Stellenbosch University
