= Aavatsmarkbreen =

Glacier in Svalbard

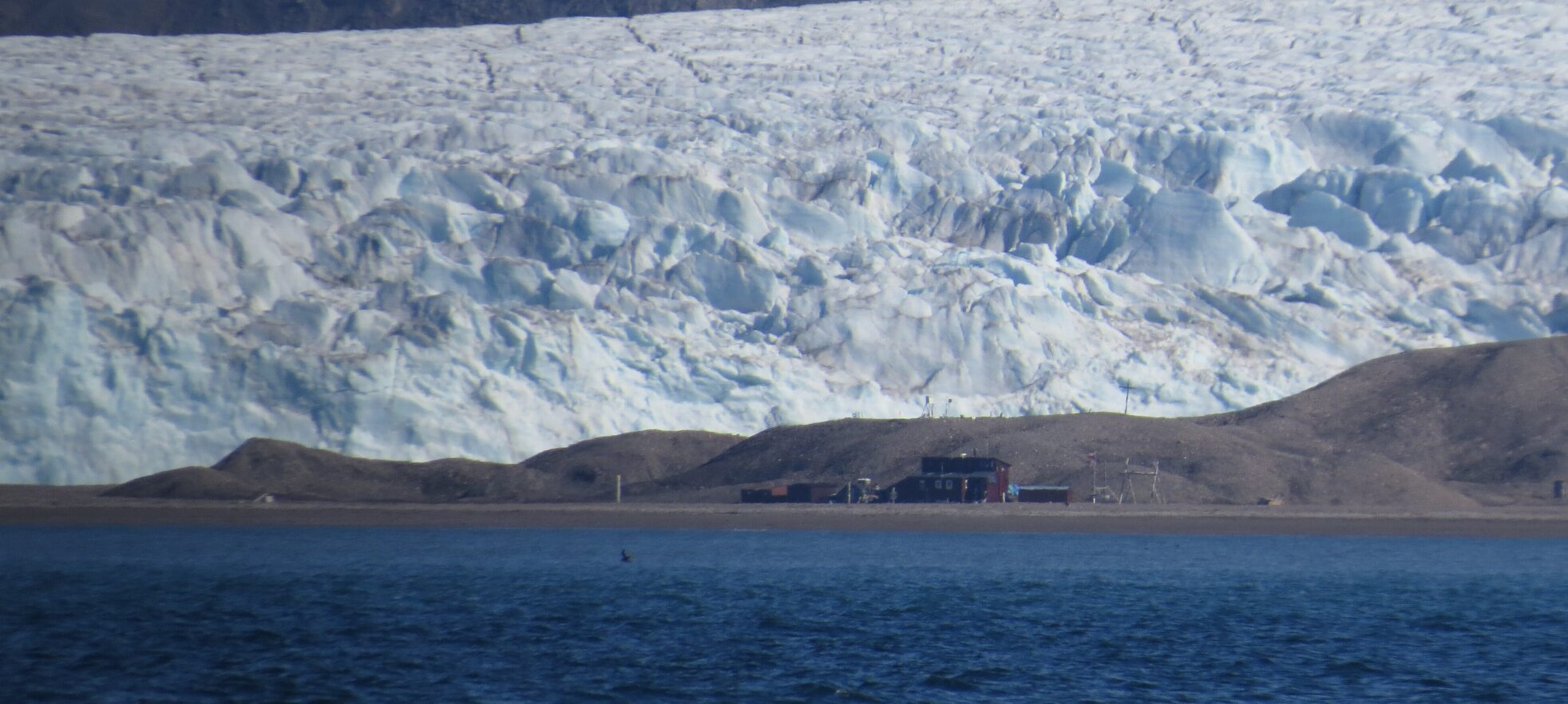

- Location within Svalbard
- Type: Glacier
- Location: Oscar II Land; Spitsbergen, Svalbard
- Coordinates: 78.70°N 12.16°E

Aavatsmarkbreen is a glacier in Oscar II Land at Spitsbergen, Svalbard. It is named after politician and military officer Ivar Aavatsmark. The glacier debouches into Forlandsundet, in the bay of Hornbækbukta. At the southern side of the glacier, between Aavatsmarkbreen and Kaffiøyra, is the mountain range of Prins Heinrichfjella.
