= Lucas Malan =

South African Afrikaans poet and academic (1946–2010)

Lucas C Malan
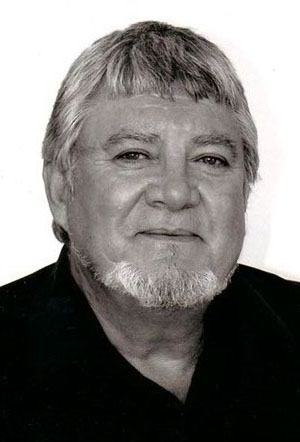
- Born: 19 July 1946; Modimolle
- Died: 15 April 2010 (aged 63); Cape Town, Western Cape
- Education: University of Johannesburg
- Occupations: Academic, poet, writer

Lucas Cornelis Malan (19 July 1946 – 15 April 2010) was a South African academic and writer of poetry, prose, plays, text books, literary reviews and other articles, principally in Afrikaans.

== Biography ==
=== Early life and academia ===
Lucas Malan was born in Nylstroom, where he also started school before matriculating at Pietersburg Hoërskool in 1963. Starting in 1964 he majored in Afrikaans and Art History at Normaal Kollege, Pretoria (now part of University of Pretoria), completing his B.A. degree in 1966 and Higher Education Diploma in 1967. From 1968 he taught Afrikaans at the Hoër Seunskool Helpmekaar in Johannesburg for five years, before taking some time out to complete a B.A. Honours degree in Afrikaans and Dutch at the Rand Afrikaans University (now University of Johannesburg) in 1974. It is during this time that his first poem is published, by the Izwi/Stem/Voice, an underground zine that offered a voice to many politically active writers of that time, including Karel Schoeman and Wilma Stockenström.

From 1975 he studies under Prof. Ernst van Heerden at the University of the Witwatersrand and is awarded an M.A. degree in 1978. After another Honours degree, in Applied Linguistics (1984), he is awarded his Doctorate in 1988 by the University of Pretoria, with a thesis entitled Paradox and Parabola: A Study of Ernst van Heerden's Later Poetry.

=== Career ===
Malan spent most of his career in service of Afrikaans education and literature. Besides his period teaching at Helpmekaar, he also taught at Jeppe High School for Boys in Johannesburg, before becoming a lecturer at the Technikon Witwatersrand. In 1987 he became head of the Department of Afrikaans at the Johannesburg College of Education (JCE) (since 2001 part of the Wits School of Education).

=== Poetry ===
According to well-known Afrikaans biographer and critic, J.C. Kannemeyer, Malan's poetry stands in contrast to the "often amorphous poetry of many of his contemporaries", as he tends to write in a conventional style, typified by traditional features such as fixed stanzas, well-defined rhyme schemes and metre. While his word selection is also reflective of extreme precision and sensitivity, he does on occasion allow his verse greater freedom, but always takes care to retain the overall "unit-forming integrity" through the inspired use of image and sound.

Hennie Aucamp agrees with Kannemeyer's assessment, whilst adding that Malan's life, work and career are typified by how much he gave of himself to his friends, fellow writers, students and to Afrikaans literature in general. Even when he was getting older and suffering from ill health, he still found ways to bring a sense of self-irony into his poetry foreshadowing his own demise.

=== Retirement and death ===
In 1997 Malan retired to the rural town of Darling, Western Cape, but remained actively writing and publishing until his death in April 2010, due to complications arising after a heart valve operation. Notable publications during this period were the poetry volumes Afstande (2002) and Vermanings (2008), as well as co-editing with Lina Spies an anthology of essays and poems called ’n Skrywer by Sonsopkoms, on the occasion of Hennie Aucamp's 70th birthday in 2004.

== Bibliography ==
=== Youth literature ===
- Die Skat in die Kelder, Tiener-publikasies (1980)

=== Poetry ===
- ’n Bark vir die Ontheemdes, Tafelberg, Cape Town (1981)
- Tydspoor, Tafelberg, Cape Town (1985)
- Edenboom, HAUM-Literêr, Pretoria (1987)
- Kaartehuis, HAUM-Literêr, Pretoria (1990)
- Hongergrond, Human & Rousseau, Cape Town (1994)
- Afstande, Protea Boekhuis, Pretoria (2002)
- Vermanings, Protea Boekhuis, Pretoria (2008)

=== Academic ===
- Barnard Gilliland se bydrae tot die Afrikaanse letterkunde (MA Thesis), University of the Witwatersrand, Johannesburg (1977)
- Afrikaans vir Andertaliges (1988)
- Paradoks en Parabool: ’n Studie oor Ernst van Heerden se Latere Poësie, HAUM-Literêr, Pretoria (1992)
- Afrikaans is piekfyn, Tafelberg, Cape Town (2006)
- Versjoernaal: nuwe Benadering tot Poësie, Pharos, Cape Town (2008)

=== Radio drama ===
- Die Jaar van die Yskaste, Radio Suid-Afrika (1986)

=== As editor ===
- Verse vir Ernst, Tafelberg, Cape Town (1991)
- Bladsak, Human & Rousseau (1996)
- ’n Skrywer by Sonsopkoms: Hennie Aucamp 70, Sun Press, Stellenbosch (2004)
