= Phil du Plessis =

Phil du Plessis (22 March 1944 – 28 November 2011) Afrikaans poet, musician and medical doctor, was born as Johannes du Plessis at Fouriesburg, in the Orange Free State, South Africa. Following the appearance of his first anthology, he was hailed by Andre Brink as the spokesman for an underground 'Sixties' group in Afrikaans poetry. Something of a Renaissance man, a leader of an Afrikaans avant-garde, his work was experimental, latterly integrating poetry and art.

== Early life and family background ==
Du Plessis' father Karel Erasmus du Plessis was a teacher at Fouriesburg at the time of Phil's birth on 22 March 1944. The family lived on a farm outside the town and Karel would ride to work on horseback every morning. His Mother, Hester Petronella, née Janse van Rensburg, was a grand niece of Commander General Hans van Rensburg of the Ossewa Brandwag.

Du Plessis was educated at Viljoenskroon and at Shannon outside Bloemfontein. He completed his high school career at Grey College in Bloemfontein. His parents having relocated to Kroonstad, where his father was appointed school inspector, he boarded in Bloemfontein with his violin teacher, Victor Pohl, who was also well known as an adventure writer. Du Plessis matriculated in 1961. His interest in writing had begun whilst he was in Standard 9, in 1958.

== Medical studies and musical career ==
Du Plessis enrolled as a medical student at the University of Pretoria where he qualified as a doctor in 1968.

Alongside his medical studies he continued to receive tuition as a violinist, from Alan Solomon, and played in the orchestra of the Toonkunsakademie as well as in the orchestra of the Collegium Musicum and in chamber groups in Pretoria. He took part in a number of radio broadcasts. His instrument, from the Tyrolean School of violin makers, dated 1693, was restored by Kotie van Soelen.

== Medical practice ==
From 1969 to 1972 Du Plessis practised as medical doctor at Stilfontein and Crown Mines, and from 1972 to 1974 at Luderitzbucht in what was still South West Africa (Namibia).

Thereafter he moved to the Cape and settled at Kalk Bay, initially renting but, in 1978, purchasing the historic house Liscard, which he restored in 1983 through the services of architects Revel Fox, John Rennie and Pat Riley. The house was declared a national monument.

Having worked for a time at Valkenberg Hospital as a clinical assistant, Du Plessis developed an interest in psychoanalysis; and his general practice at Kalkbay came to be augmented by his role in psychiatry.

Near the end of his life he was in general practice and had his surgery at home. He was well known in the village and treated the residents at the Haven Night Shelter free of charge.

== Poet ==
From 1964, when Du Plessis met the young poet Wilhelm Knobel, he began himself to write poetry, joining in a group from 1966 that met monthly to submit and discuss one another's work. His first poems were published in Sestiger, while he was becoming involved in the literary magazines Wurm and Ophir. His local circle included De Waal Venter, Casper Schmidt and D.P.M. Botha and the poets Peter Horn and Walter Saunders. International correspondents included Netherlanders, Belgians, Englishmen, Czechs and a South American, together with a group of Americans from Greece, who published letters, poems and opinion pieces in Wurm. Working closely with Marie Blomerus, Du Plessis served as editor of Wurm, Izwi and New Nation, as well as a Flemish periodical, Argo. In the Netherlands and Flanders he worked with the journals Yang, Argo and Labris. Locally he published literary and musical reviews in all the important Afrikaans papers.

It was at this period and apparently on account of some of this activity that Du Plessis was held overnight for interrogation by the Security Police at the notorious apartheid-era John Vorster Square police station in Johannesburg.

From 1971 Du Plessis published his work in a succession of anthologies:

- Geskrifte on ’n houtgesig, 1965–1970 (Tafelberg 1971)
- Die diep soet afgeronde stem van my dooies: gedigte 1970–1974 (Tafelberg 1975)
- Lyksang: gedigte 1974–1980 (Perskor 1980)
- Gebed vir Wilhelm (Kalkbaai: Phil du Plessis 1984)
- Ek sing waar ek staan = I sing where I stand: poësie 1982–1984 – versions from Afrikaans (English translations by Patrick Cullinan) (Kalkbaai: Vooraand Uitgewers 1985)
- Ek sing waar ek staan: gedigte 1982–1986 (Tafelberg 1986)
- Dae voor winter (Tafelberg 1989)
- Openbaringe van Johannes (Carrefour Press 1992)
- Op Koueberg: vrye verwerking van 40 verse deur Han-Sjan (Snailpress 1993)
- Engel uit die Paradys (Hond 1994)
- Nagjoernaal: gedigte 1994–1996 (Lindlife 1996)
- Herakles van Valsbaai: gedigte 1996–1999 (Kalliope 1999)
- Woordweer: gedigte uit die twintigste eeu (Protea Boekhuis 2004)

Working with alternative publishers from the 1990s, he had a greater involvement in the making of each book, in the choice of type and of paper. A significant new element in these later anthologies was the integration of illustrations in collaboration with a range artists: with Braam Kruger in Openbaringe van Johannes; Hugo Slabber in Engel uit die paradys; Judith Mason in Nagjoernaal; Jan Visser in Herakles by Valsbaai; and Gus Ferguson in Op Koueberg, in which du Plessis makes translations of Chinese verse. Antjie Krog referred to the hazards of combining poetry and visual art but felt that "a perfect unity" had been achieved particularly in the drawings of Ferguson "with the clear vivid and playful poetry" in Op Koueberg. Judith Mason promised, in a review of Openbaringe van Johannes, that "for the price of a good cabernet," one would be holding in one's hands "a book which is brutal and charming, outrageous and compassionate, sensual and sore, angry and immeasurably humane. Like the man himself.”

== At home ==
Du Plessis hosted legendary Sunday luncheon gatherings at "Liscard", his Kalk Bay home. Amongst regular guests at one period were Robert Ardrey (until his death in 1980) and his actress wife (and widow) Berdine Grünewald, who had retired to nearby St James. Longer-term guests invited to recuperate from illness under his roof and his care were Wopko Jensma and Sheila Cussons. Guests have recalled his playing his violin on Sunday afternoons.

Du Plessis married Catherine Lauga, a lecturer in French at the University of Cape Town. She is the translator of a number of well-known South-African novelists writing in English, amongst them J.M. Coetzee, Nobel Prize Laureate.

He died on 28 November 2011 after a long battle with various health issues. A very well attended service was held in the Holy Trinity Church Kalk Bay following his death, and his ashes were scattered from a small fishing boat in front of his beloved "Liscard". At the service musical tributes were paid to du Plessis by well-known classical musicians, many of whom shared his love of music.
