= Ernst van Heerden =

South African poet (1916–1997)

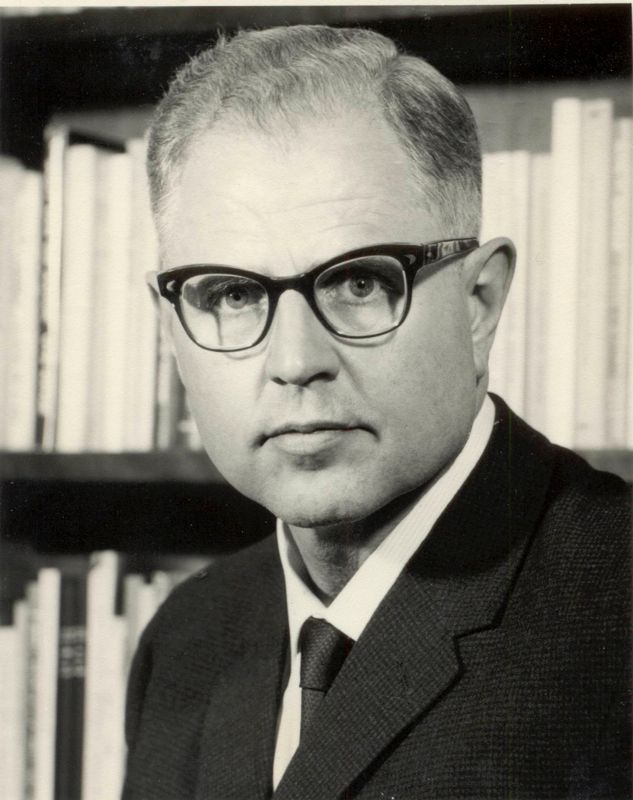
- Born: 20 March 1916; Pearston
- Died: 30 September 1997 (aged 81); Johannesburg
- Education: University of Stellenbosch
- Occupations: Academic, poet, writer

Ernst van Heerden (20 March 1916 – 30 September 1997) was a prominent South African poet, literary critic, and academic who wrote primarily in Afrikaans. Over his prolific career, he published fifteen volumes of poetry and was honored with numerous awards, including the prestigious Hertzog Prize.

== Early life and education ==
Van Heerden was born in the town of Pearston in the Eastern Cape, South Africa, to Pieter, a shopkeeper, and Elsie van Heerden, a teacher who first introduced him to poetry. He attended school in Pearston before completing his schooling at Grey High School in Port Elizabeth. After achieving first place in South Africa in the Taalbond exam in 1931, he matriculated in 1932.

He continued his tertiary education at Stellenbosch University, earning a B.A. degree in 1935 and an M.A. in 1936. In 1938 and 1939, he followed a doctoral course at the University of Amsterdam, though his studies were cut short by the outbreak of the Second World War. He later attained his D.Litt. et Phil. with the highest distinction from Ghent University in Belgium in 1951, submitting a thesis on the poetic imagery of N. P. van Wyk Louw.

== Academic career ==
Van Heerden's academic career began in 1942 with a temporary lecturing post at the University College of Natal, followed by positions lecturing in English and Afrikaans at Stellenbosch University. In 1960, supported by N.P. van Wyk Louw, he accepted a lectureship at the University of the Witwatersrand (Wits) in Johannesburg as a professor of Afrikaans and Nederlands in 1967. Following Louw's death in 1970, Van Heerden succeeded him as the head of the department, where he served in this role until his retirement in 1981.

== Literary contributions ==
Van Heerden made his literary debut in 1942 with the poetry collection Weerlose Uur. His work is known for its technical mastery, evolving over time from rigid forms to more open, conversational, and philosophically introspective verse. In 1962, he was awarded the Hertzog Prize for his collection Die Klop (1961), with the prize committee praising his introduction of new motifs and innovative imagery into Afrikaans poetry. Other notable award-winning collections include Teenstrydige Liedere (1972) and Amulet teen die Vuur (1987), both of which won the W.A. Hofmeyr Prize, with the latter also taking the CNA Prize.

Beyond poetry, Van Heerden was highly regarded as a literary critic. In 1991, the Suid-Afrikaanse Akademie vir Wetenskap en Kuns awarded him the Gustav Preller Prize for literature science and literary criticism.

== Sporting achievements ==
Unusual for an academic of his stature, Van Heerden was an elite athlete and a South African weightlifting champion. He founded the Western Province Weightlifting Union and the weightlifting club at Stellenbosch University, and he frequently assisted rugby legend Danie Craven with weight-training rehabilitation for injured players. His sporting passions heavily influenced his writing; during the 1948 Summer Olympics in London, a collection of his sports poems was awarded a silver medal. He also attended the 1952 Summer Olympics in Helsinki as a judge and manager of the South African weightlifting team.

== Personal life and death ==
Between late 1973 and 1974, Van Heerden suffered a severe medical trauma when thrombosis led to the amputation of both his legs above the knees. He adapted to this life-altering physical disability by finding freedom in swimming and returning to his academic work using a modified vehicle. This period of intense physical suffering profoundly impacted his later poetry, bringing a new vulnerability, compassion, and realism to his work.

Throughout his life, Van Heerden was recognized with honorary doctorates from the University of the Witwatersrand (1982), Rhodes University (1985), the University of the Free State (1991), and Stellenbosch University (1995). He was also granted honorary citizenship of his hometown of Pearston in 1983.

Ernst van Heerden passed away on 30 September 1997 at the Olivedale Clinic in Johannesburg due to physical deterioration. His extensive poetry collection was bequeathed to his friend and fellow poet, Lucas Malan, who decided to donate it to the Poëziecentrum in Ghent, Belgium.
