= Le Testament =

Book by François Villon

Le Testament is a collection of poetry composed in 1461 by François Villon. Le Testament, comprising over twenty essentially independent poems in octosyllabic verse, consists of a series of fixed-form poems, namely 16 ballades and three rondeaux, and is recognized as a gem of medieval literature.

== Analysis ==
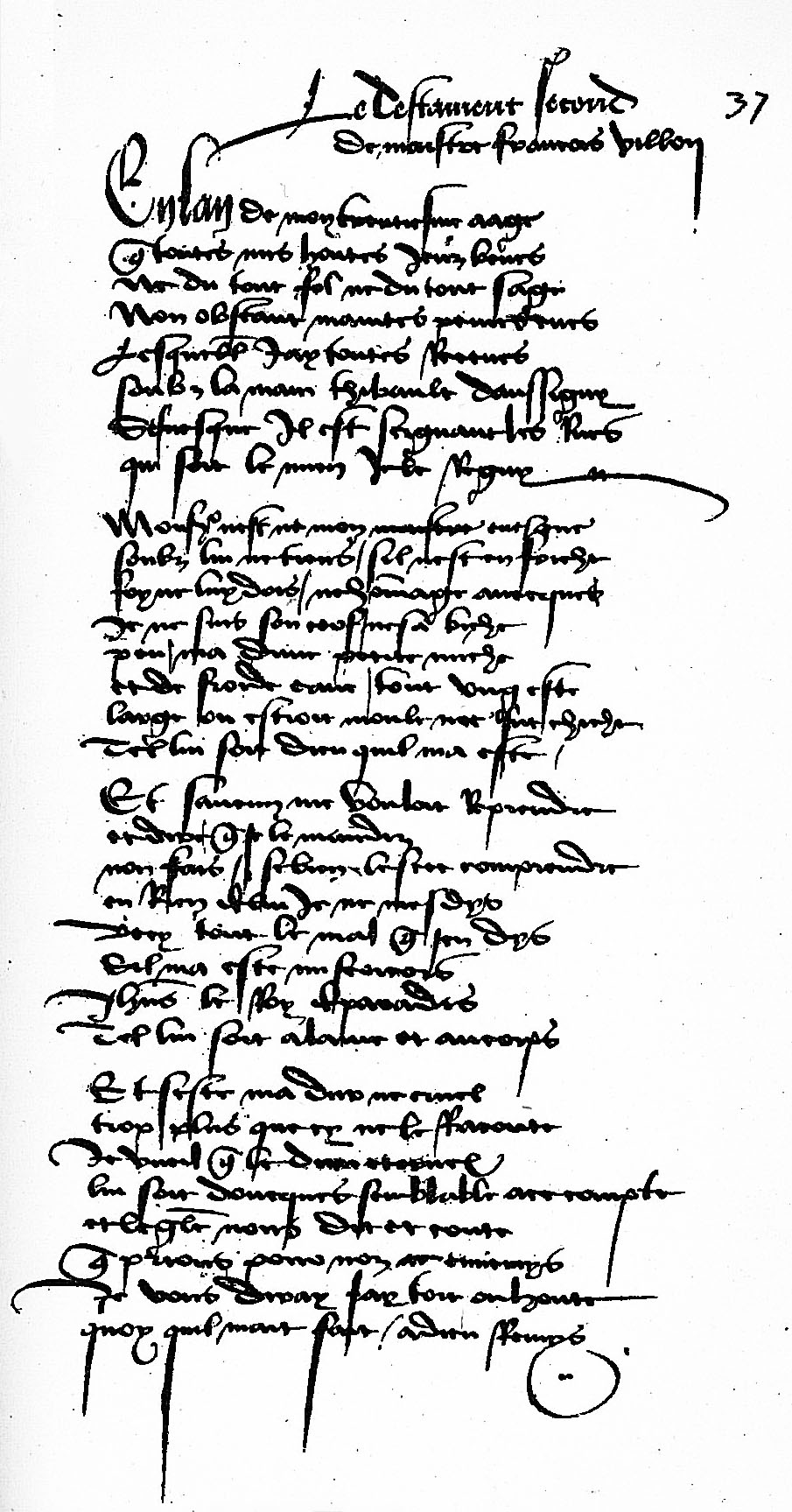
A page from Villon's Le grand testament. Kungliga biblioteket in Stockholm, Sweden.

The 2,023 lines of the Testament are marked by the immediate prospect of death by hanging and frequently describe other forms of misery and death. It mixes reflections on the passing of time, bitter derision, invective, and religious fervor. This mixed tone of tragic sincerity stands in contrast to the other poets of the time.

In one of these poems, Ballade des dames du temps jadis ("Ballad of the Ladies of Times Past"), each stanza and the concluding envoi asks after the fate of various celebrated women, including Héloise and Joan of Arc, and ends with the same semi-ironic question:

Dictes moy ou n'en quel pays
Est Flora le belle Romaine
Archipiades, ne Thaïs,
Qui fut sa cousine germaine,
Echo parlant quant bruyt on maine
Dessus riviere ou sus estan,
Qui beaulté ot trop plus qu'humaine.
Mais ou sont les neiges d'antan?

Tell me where, in which country
Is Flora, the beautiful Roman;
Archipiada (Alcibiades?), and Thaïs
Who was her cousin;
Echo, speaking when one makes noise
Over river or on pond,
Who had a beauty too much more than human?
Oh, where are the snows of yesteryear!

—Anthony Weir

This same "Ballade des dames du temps jadis" was famously translated into English in 1870 by Dante Gabriel Rossetti as "Ballade of Dead Ladies". Rossetti translated the refrain as "But where are the snows of yester-year?"

== Poems ==
Poems included in Le Testament are:

- Ballade des dames du temps jadis (1458–59) (see also main article: Ballade des dames du temps jadis)
- Ballade des seigneurs du temps jadis
- Ballade en vieux language françois
- Les regrets de la belle Heaulmiere
- Ballade de la Belle Heaulmière aux filles de joie
- Double ballade sur le mesme propos
- Ballade pour prier Nostre Dame
- Ballade à s'amie
- Lay ou rondeau
- Ballade pour Jean Cotart
- Ballade pour Robert d'Estouteville
- Ballade des langues ennuieuses
- Les Contredits de Franc Gontier
- Ballade des femmes de Paris
- Ballade de la Grosse Margot
- Belle leçon aux enfants perdus
- Ballade de bonne doctrine
- Rondeau ou bergeronnette
- Épitaphe
- Rondeau
- Ballade de conclusion

== See also ==
- Ballade des pendus
- Poetical testament
- Neuss Testament
- Karl Anton Klammer
- Paul Zech
