= Ballade des dames du temps jadis =

Poem by François Villon

- by François Villon
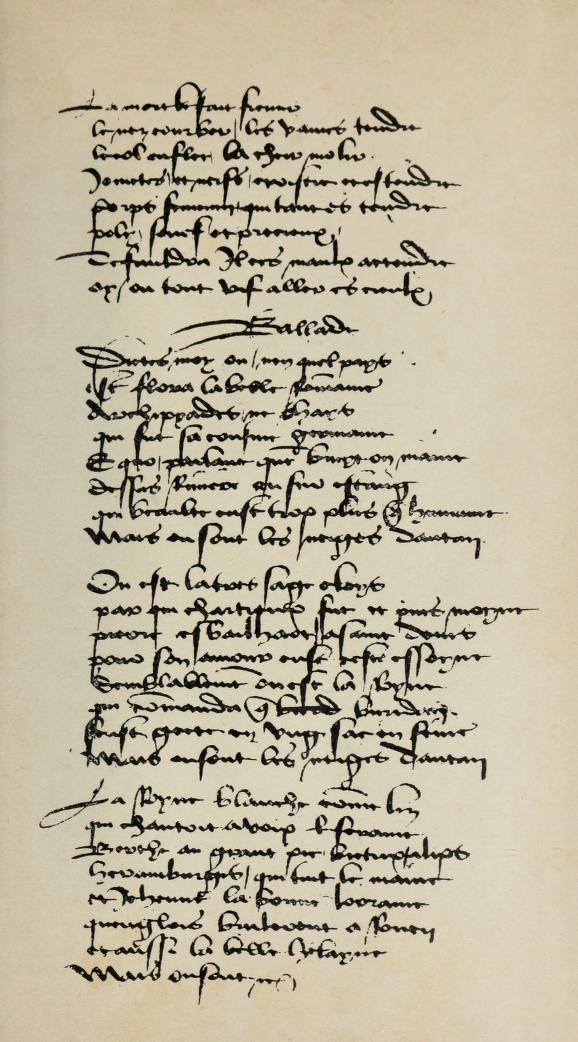
- The poem in the Stockholm manuscript, late 15th century
- Original title: Ballade des dames du temps jadis
- Written: 1461
- Country: France
- Language: Middle French
- Subject: Lives of illustrious women
- Form: Ballade
- Meter: iambic tetrameter
- Rhyme scheme: ababbcbC ababbcbC ababbcbC bcbC
- Media type: Manuscript
- Lines: 28
- Le_Grand_Testament#Ballade_des_dames_du_temps_jadis at French Wikisource

The "Ballade des dames du temps jadis" ("Ballade of Ladies of Time Gone By") is a Middle French poem by François Villon that celebrates famous women in history and mythology, and a prominent example of the ubi sunt? genre. It is written in the fixed-form ballade format, and forms part of his collection Le Testament in which it is followed by the Ballade des seigneurs du temps jadis.

The section is simply labelled Ballade by Villon; the title des dames du temps jadis was added by Clément Marot in his 1533 edition of Villon's poems.

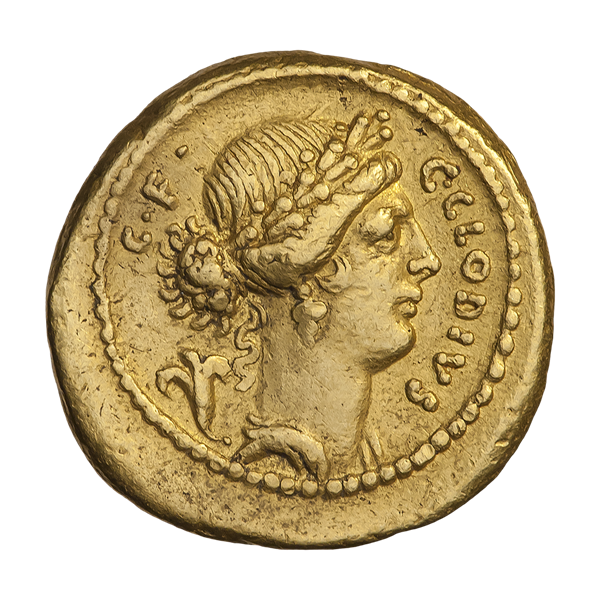
Flora

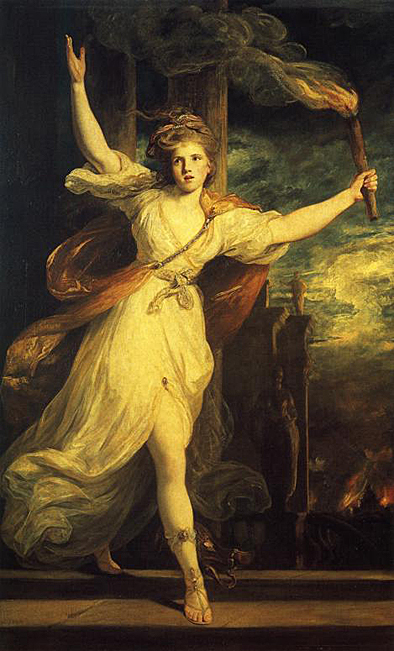
Thaïs

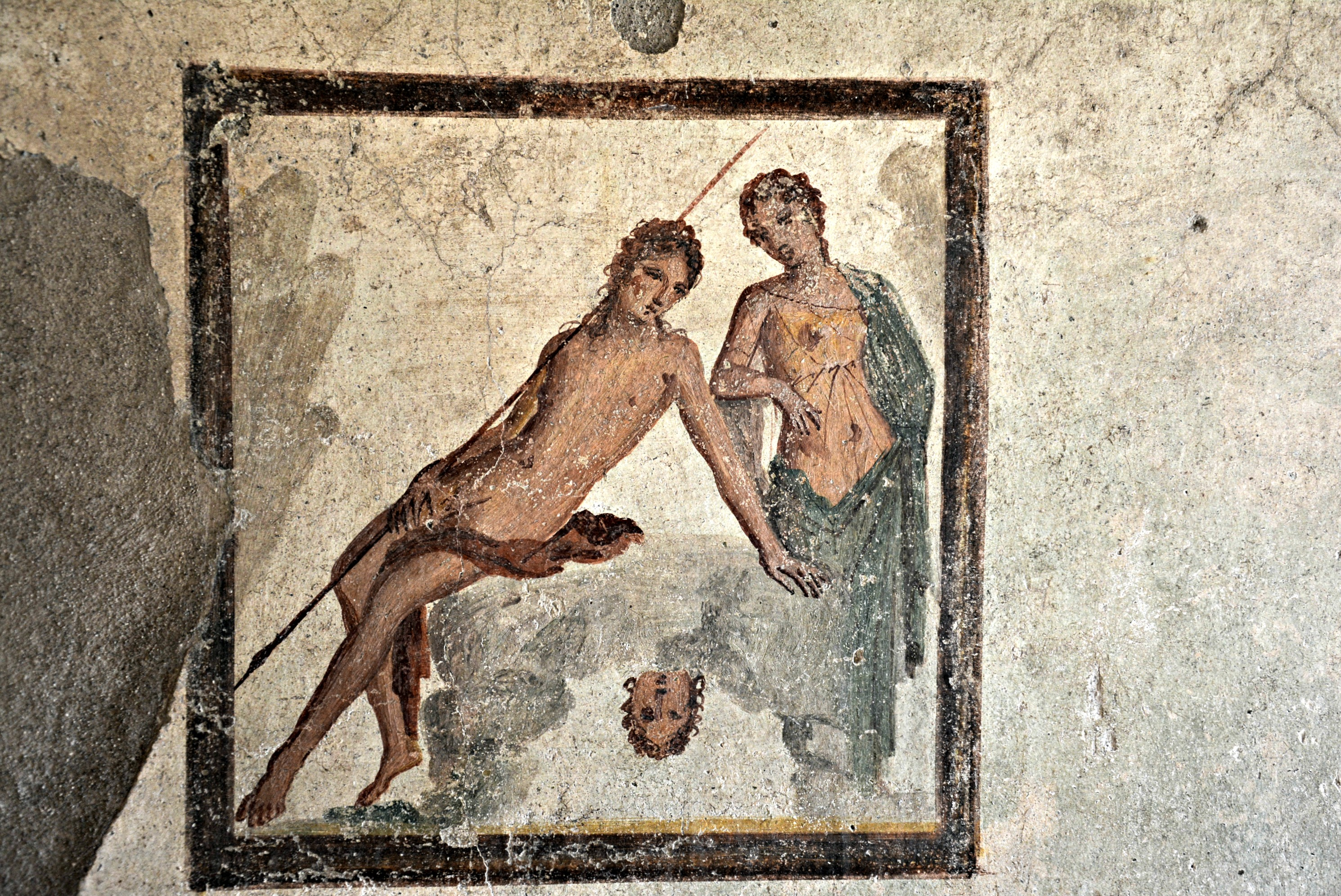
Echo (right)

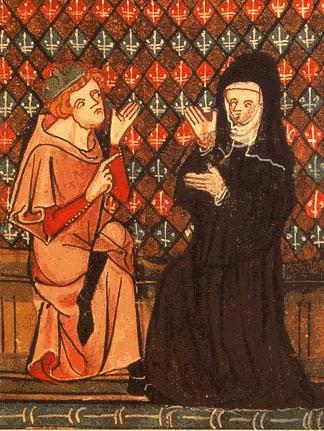
Héloïse (right)

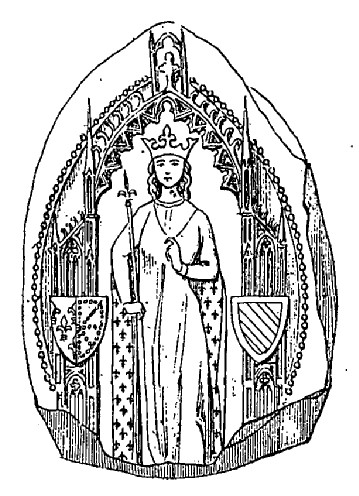
Margaret of Burgundy

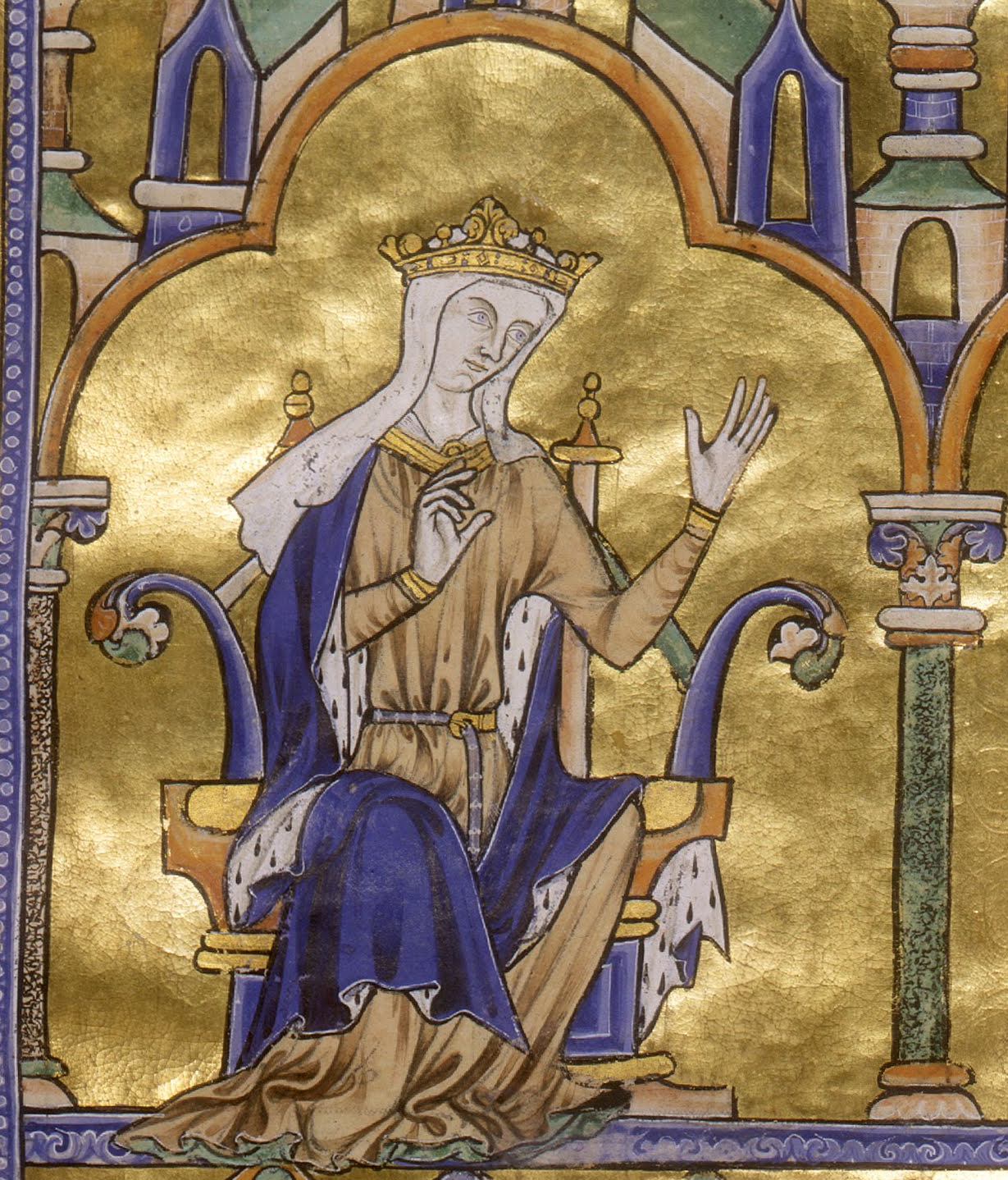
Blanche of Castile

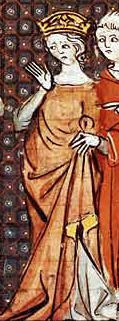
Aélis

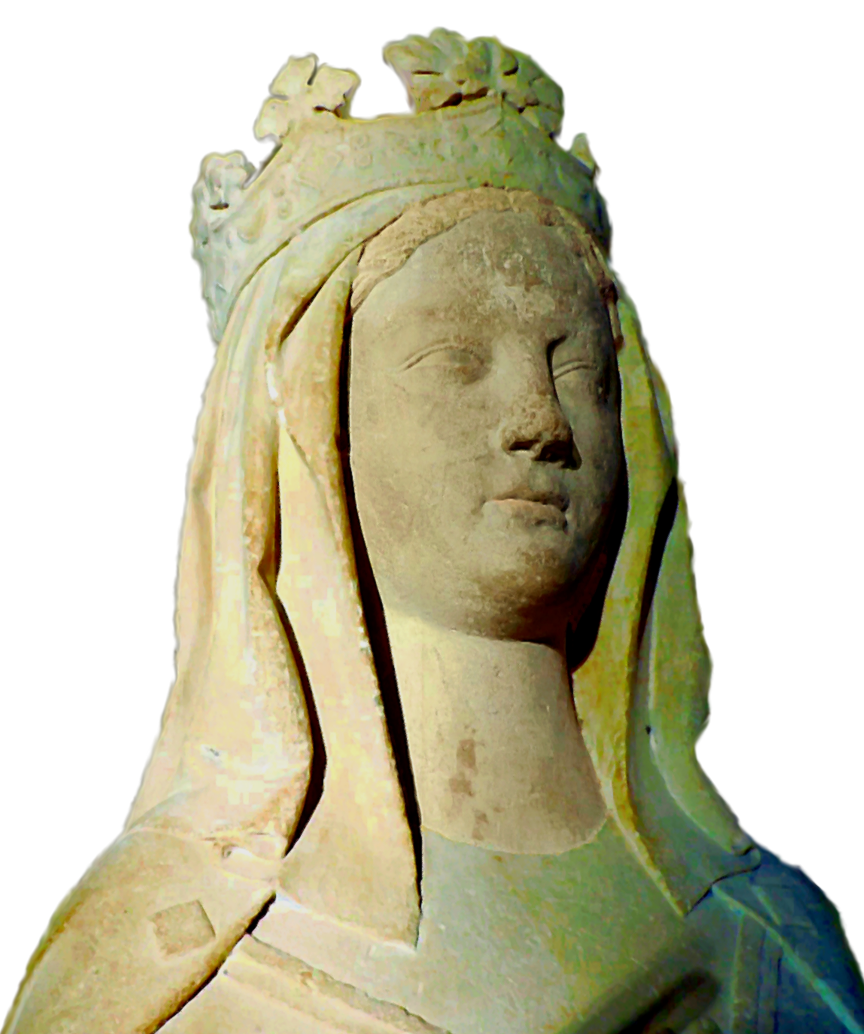
Bertha Broadfoot

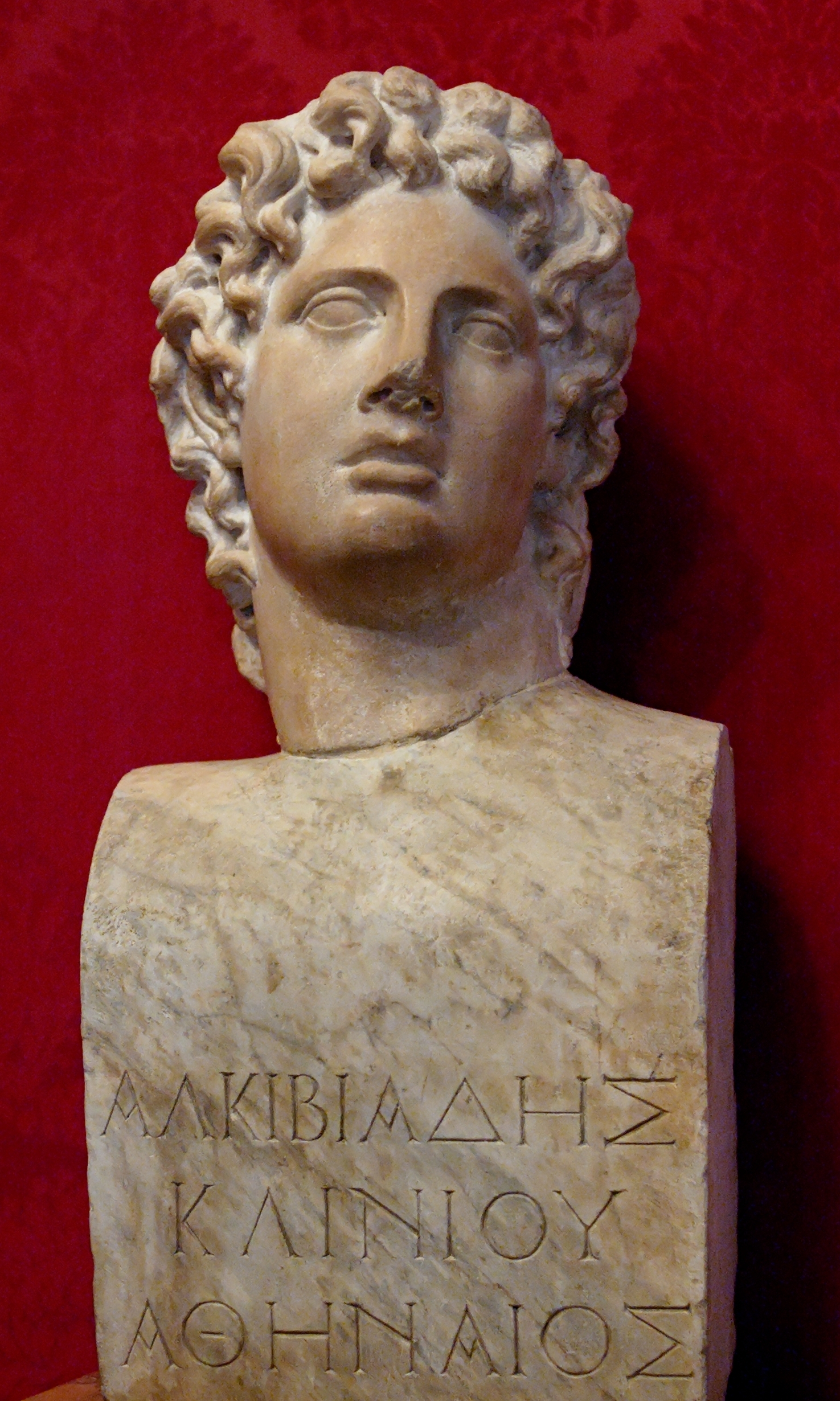
Alcibiades ("Archipiada")

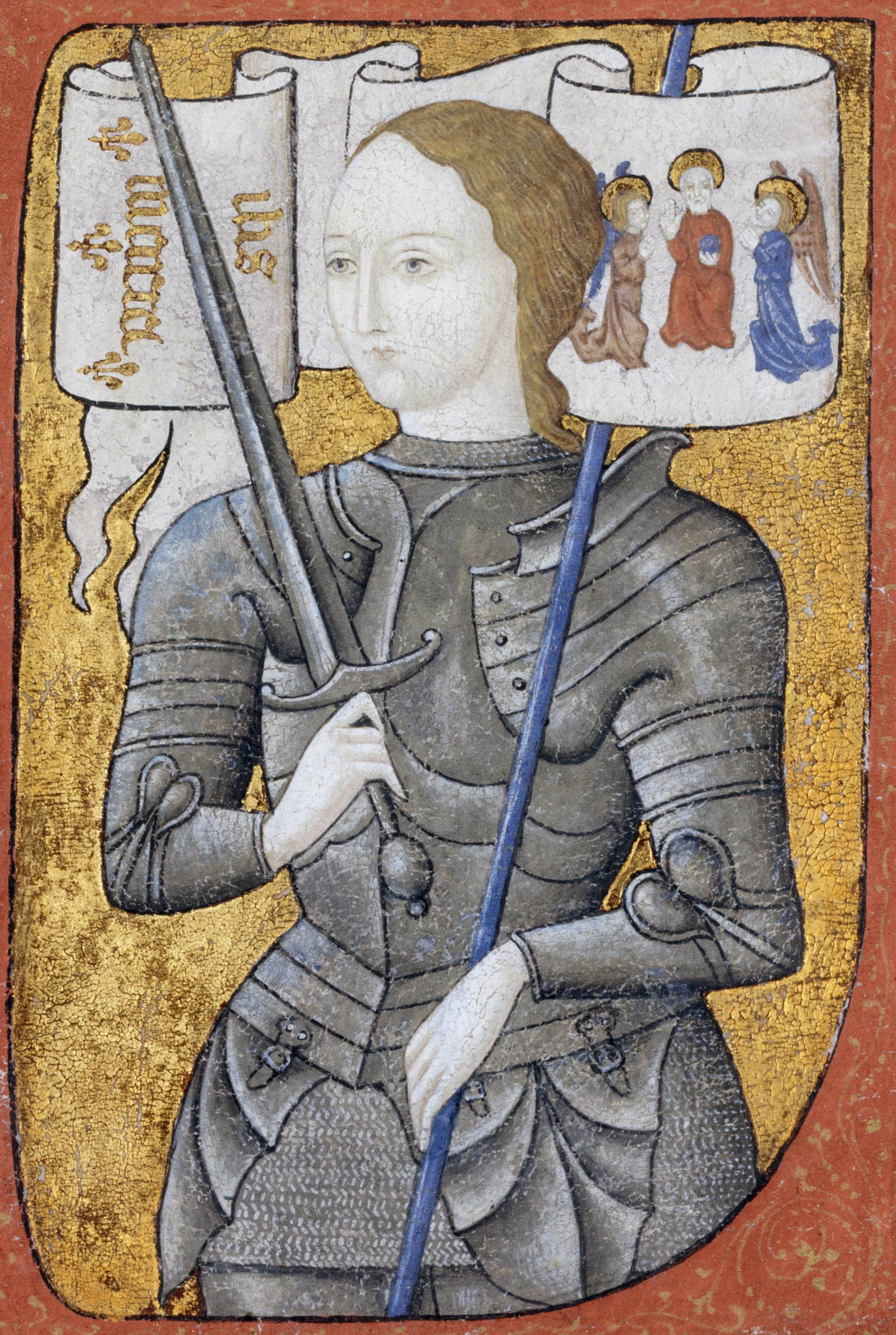
Joan of Arc

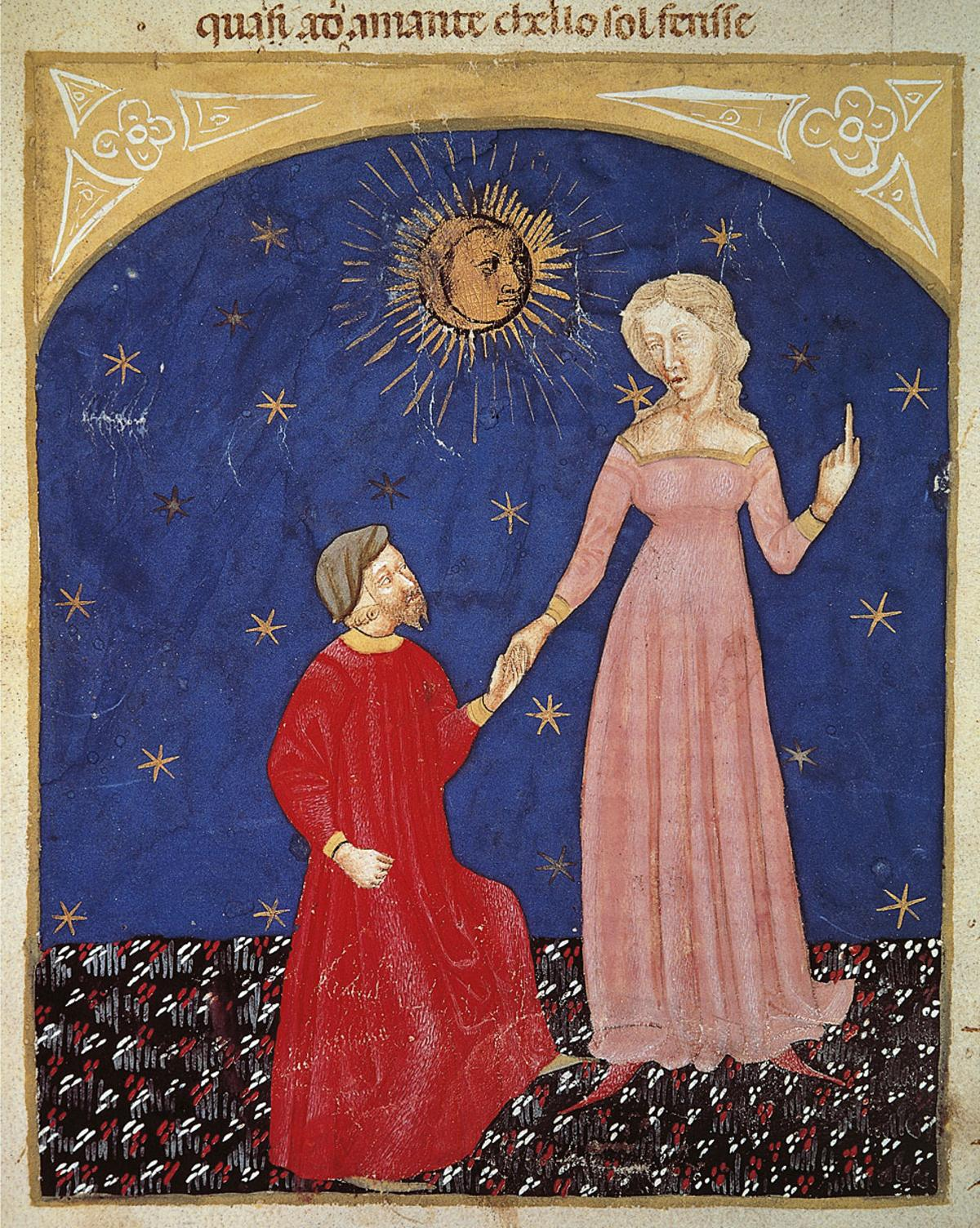
Beatrice (right)

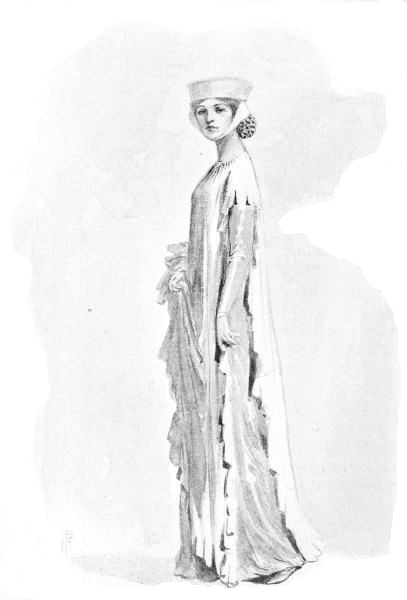
Eremburga of Maine (drawing of 12th-century lady's costume)

The women (and man) mentioned in the Ballad

== Translations and adaptations ==
Particularly famous is its interrogative refrain, Mais où sont les neiges d'antan?, an example of the ubi sunt motif, which was common in medieval poetry and particularly in Villon's ballads.

This was translated into English by Dante Gabriel Rossetti as "Where are the snows of yesteryear?", for which he popularized the word "yesteryear" to translate Villon's antan. The French word was used in its original sense of "last year", although both antan and the English yesteryear have now taken on a wider meaning of "years gone by". The phrase has also been translated as "But where are last year's snows?".

The ballade has been made into a song (using the original Middle French text) by French songwriter Georges Brassens, and by the Czech composer Petr Eben, in the cycle Šestero piesní milostných (1951).

== Text of the ballade, with literal translation ==
The text is from Clement Marot's Œuvres complètes de François Villon of 1533, in the Le Grand Testament pages 34 to 35.

Dictes moy où, n'en quel pays,
Est Flora, la belle Romaine;
Archipiada, ne Thaïs,
Qui fut sa cousine germaine;
Echo, parlant quand bruyt on maine
Dessus rivière ou sus estan,
Qui beauté eut trop plus qu'humaine?
Mais où sont les neiges d'antan!

Où est la très sage Heloïs,
Pour qui fut chastré et puis moyne
Pierre Esbaillart à Sainct-Denys?
Pour son amour eut cest essoyne.
Semblablement, où est la royne
Qui commanda que Buridan
Fust jetté en ung sac en Seine?
Mais où sont les neiges d'antan!

La royne Blanche comme ung lys,
Qui chantoit à voix de sereine;
Berthe au grand pied, Bietris, Allys;
Harembourges qui tint le Mayne,
Et Jehanne, la bonne Lorraine,
Qu'Anglois bruslerent à Rouen;
Où sont-ilz, Vierge souveraine ?
Mais où sont les neiges d'antan!

Prince, n'enquerez de sepmaine
Où elles sont, ne de cest an,
Qu'à ce refrain ne vous remaine:
Mais où sont les neiges d'antan!

Translation:

Tell me where, in which country
Is Flora, the beautiful Roman;
Archipiada, (Note: "Archipiada" is thought to be Villon's misremembering of Alcibiades, a friend of Socrates who was reputed to be a model of beauty, and who in the Middle Ages was therefore assumed to be a woman.) or Thaïs
Who was her first cousin;
Echo, speaking when one makes noise
Over river or on pond,
Who had a beauty too much more than human?
Oh, where are the snows of yesteryear!

Where is the very wise Héloïse,
For whom was castrated, and then made a monk,
Peter Abelard in Saint-Denis?
For his love he suffered this sentence.
Similarly, where is the Queen
Who ordered that Buridan
Be thrown in a sack into the Seine?
Oh, where are the snows of yesteryear!

The queen white as a lily
Who sang with a Siren's voice;
Bertha Broadfoot, Beatrice, Aélis;
Eremburga who ruled over the Maine,
And Joan, the good woman from Lorraine
Whom the English burned in Rouen;
Where are they, oh sovereign Virgin?
Oh, where are the snows of yesteryear!

Prince, do not ask me in the whole week
Where they are — neither in this whole year,
Lest I bring you back to this refrain:
Oh, where are the snows of yesteryear!

== Cultural references ==
The refrain Mais où sont les neiges d'antan? has been quoted or alluded to in numerous works.

- In Der Rosenkavalier (1911), the opera by Richard Strauss to an original German libretto by Hugo von Hofmannsthal, the Marschallin asks, in her monologue toward the end of Act 1 as she considers her own, younger self: "Wo ist die jetzt? Ja, such' dir den Schnee vom vergangenen Jahr!" ("Where is she now? Yes, look for the snow of yesteryear.")
- In Ezra Pound's 1926 collections of poems Personae, the line is alluded to in the poem "Villonaud for this Yule". The line "Wineing the ghosts of yester-year." ends every stanza of the poem.
- In Bertolt Brecht's 1936 play Die Rundköpfe und die Spitzköpfe (Round Heads and Pointed Heads), the line is quoted as "Wo sind die Tränen von gestern abend? / Wo is die Schnee vom vergangenen Jahr?" ("Where are the tears of yester evening? / Where are the snows of yesteryear?") in "Lied eines Freudenmädchens" (Nannas Lied) ("Song of a joy-maiden [prostitute]" (Nanna's song)); music originally by Hanns Eisler, alternative arrangement by Kurt Weill.
- The original 1945 manuscript of the play, "The Glass Menagerie" by Tennessee Williams, contains optional stage directions for projecting the legend "Où sont les neiges d'antan?" on a screen during Amanda's monologue in Scene One where she recounts her (likely exaggerated) past life as a popular Southern belle.
- The poem was alluded to in Joseph Heller's 1961 novel Catch-22, when Yossarian asks "Where are the Snowdens of yesteryear?" in both French and English, Snowden being the name of a character who dies despite the efforts of Yossarian to save him.
- Umberto Eco quotes the line "Where are the snows of yesteryear?" in the final chapter "Last Page" of The Name of the Rose.
- James O'Barr wrote "Oú? sont les neiges d'antan Villon" in his 1981 graphic novel The Crow under an image of The Crow lying broken hearted and empty.
- In S2:E9 of Downton Abbey, the Dowager Countess of Grantham, played by Dame Maggie Smith, quotes the refrain "Mais où sont les neiges d'antan?" in its original French, when referring to the father of the present Lord "Jinks" Hepworth, whom she knew in the 1860s.
- In Inglorious Basterds, lieutenant Archie Hicox, played by Michael Fassbender, paraphrases this poem by quoting "...and like the snows of yesteryear, gone from this earth" when talking to General Ed Fenech, played by Mike Myers.

== See also ==
- Le Testament
- François Villon
- Ballade des pendus
