= H.C. Prinsen Geerligs =

Dutch chemist

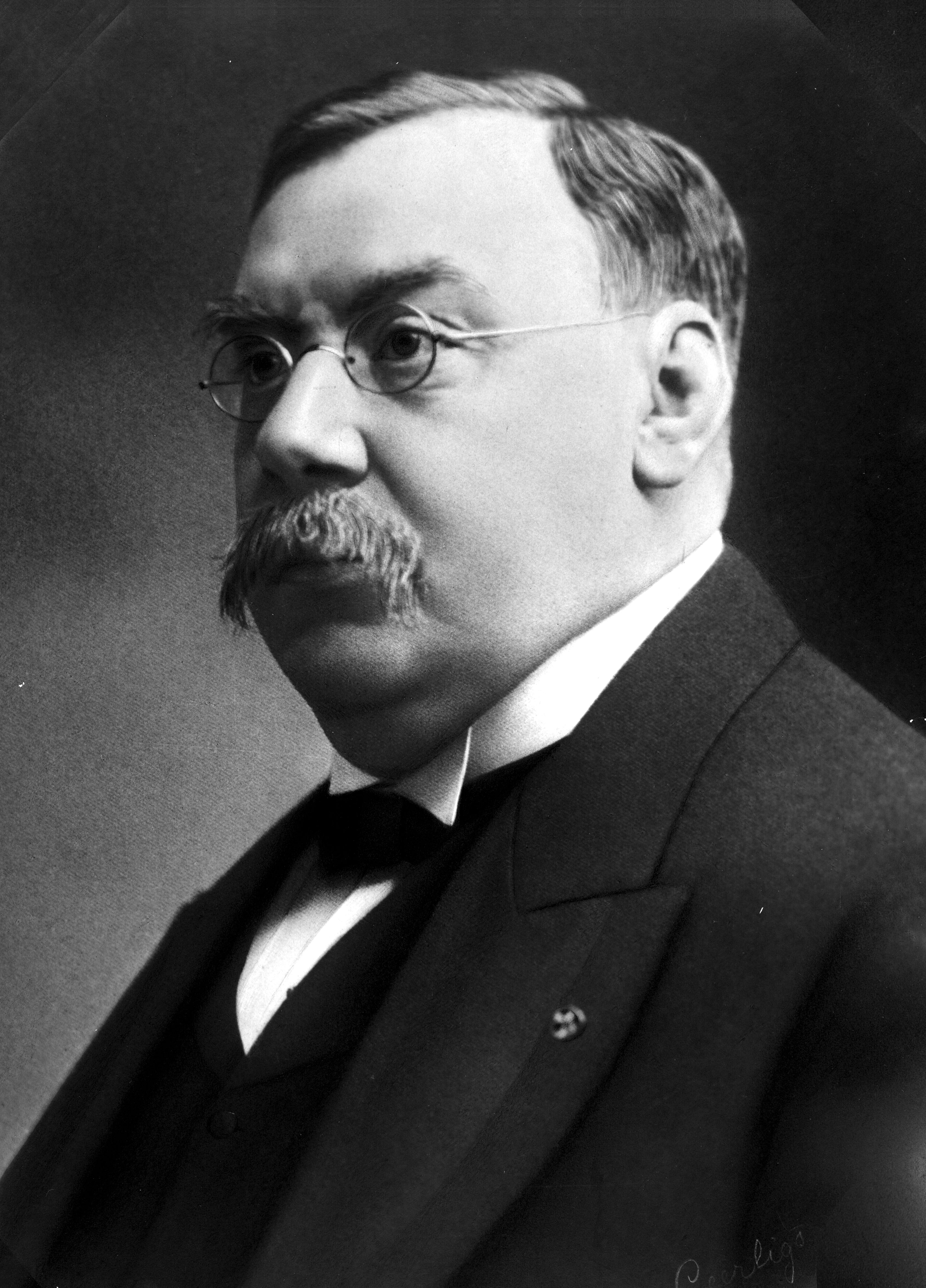
Dr H.C. Prinsen Geerlings, c. 1920

Hendrik Coenraad Prinsen Geerligs (24 November 1864 – 31 July 1953) was a Dutch chemist and sugar technologist active in Java in the early part of the 20th century.

== Biography ==
Prinsen Geerligs was born in Haarlem, Netherlands on 24 November 1864. He was the son of a schoolmaster and did his primary and high schooling in Haarlem and later at the public Handelsschool in Amsterdam he wrote the final examinations there in 1883. He then studied chemistry at the University of Amsterdam. He worked in the chemical/technical office of the firm Wijnhoff en van Gulpen until 1891. After which he went to Java to work as an assistant chemist at the Kagok Sugar Research Station.

He wrote a number of books on sugar manufacturing.

He was a member of the Royal Dutch Academy of Science and their correspondent for the Natural Sciences section from 9 May 1899 to 1 October 1909. He was elected a member of the German Academy of Natural Scientists Leopoldina in 1907.

== Works ==
- On cane sugar and the process of its manufacture in Java. Altrincham (Manchester): Office of the "Sugar Cane". 1902.
- Cane sugar and its manufacture. Altrincham (Manchester): Norman Rodger. 1909.
- The world's cane sugar industry, past and present. Altrincham (Manchester): Norman Rodger. 1912.
- Practical white sugar manufacture: or The manufacture of plantation white sugar directly from the sugar cane. London: Norman Rodger. 1915.
- Chemical control in cane sugar factories. London: Norman Rodger. 1917.
