= South African poetry =

Poetry of South Africa

The poetry of South Africa covers a broad range of themes, forms and styles. This article discusses the context that contemporary poets have come from and identifies the major poets of South Africa, their works and influence.

The South African literary landscape from the 19th century to the present day has been fundamentally shaped by the social and political evolution of the country, particularly the trajectory from a colonial trading station to an apartheid state and finally toward a democracy. Primary forces of population growth and economic change, which have propelled urban development, have also impacted on the themes, forms and styles of literature and poetry. South Africa has a rich literary history. Fiction, and poetry specifically, has been written in all of South Africa's 11 official languages.

== Poets in the colonial era ==
While it has been recorded that literature by black South Africans only emerged in the 20th century, this is only a reflection of published works at the time, not of the reality that black South Africans were writing and reciting in oral forms. The first generation of mission-educated African writers sought to restore dignity to Africans by invoking and reconstructing a heroic African past.

Herbert Isaac Ernest Dhlomo's iconic works preached a "return to the Talita source" or the wisdom of finding traditional ways of dealing with modern problems. His works included several plays and the long poem The Valley of a Thousand Hills (1941). Poets such as B. W. Vilakazi gave new literary life to their aboriginal languages, combining the traditional influence of Zulu oral praise poetry (izibongo) with that of the influence of English poets such as Keats, Shelley, Dunbar, Cotter, Gray and Goldsmith (some of whose poetry he translated into Zulu). Herman Charles Bosman, is best known for his Unto Dust and In the Withaak's Shade, capturing a portrait of Afrikaner storytelling skills and social attitudes. Bosman also wrote poetry, with a predominantly satirical tone.

== Post-colonial writing ==
Alan Paton's world-renowned and highly poetic novel Cry, The Beloved Country was published just four months after the separatist National Party came to power in South Africa. Although Paton was most prolific in other literary genres, poetry was a form that interested him throughout his life, as documented in Peter Alexander's biography of him.

Some of the best-known poets of this violently oppressive and politically turbulent period of South African history from 1948 to 1990 include Dennis Brutus, Ingrid Jonker, Mazisi Kunene, Nicolaas Petrus van Wyk Louw, William Ewart Gladstone (W. E. G.) Louw, James Matthews, Mzwakhe Mbuli, Oswald Mbuyiseni Mtshali, Sydney Vernon Petersen and Diederik Johannes Opperman.

Antjie Krog's first volume of poetry Dogter van Jefta, published in 1970 when she was just 17 years old, caused a stir in the Afrikaans community specifically for her then controversial poem My mooi land ("My beautiful land"). To date she has published ten volumes of poetry as well as three volumes of children's verse in Afrikaans, with her later works becoming increasingly politicised and gender–sensitising.

Among Black female authors of the time, the late Bessie Head and Sindiwe Magona (who went into exile in Botswana and USA respectively) are better known as novelists but did write poetry too. Women Writing Africa: The Southern Region by Margaret J. Daymond embodies the poetry and writing of several black South African women poets who were writing and performing poetry during this era of struggle but like many others were only published outside the country or in grassroots South African literary magazines, COSAW (Congress of South African Writers) publications and the journal Staffrider.

Many of these poets, particularly the anti-apartheid writers, suffered personally in forms ranging from exile, house arrest, detention and torture to the banning of their literature or their right to public speaking. This was because they questioned and opposed apartheid law, as well as raised national and international awareness of the injustices committed in the country during a long period of media censorship, state propaganda, cultural boycott, mass detentions, and the killing of freedom struggle activists as well as ordinary black citizens.

The "Drum writers" of the 1950s reflected a new generation of black writers talking about the conditions of their lives, using the popular Drum magazine as their forum to depict a vibrant urban black culture for the first time. Notable poets of the period associated with Drum were Peter Clarke, Richard Rive and James Matthews, an incendiary poet who fittingly entitled his first collection of poetry Cry Rage, published in 1972, co-authored with Gladys Thomas, which was banned by the Apartheid authorities.

The Afrikaans literary scene in the 1960s also flourished with the emergence of Jan Rabie, Etienne Leroux, Andre Brink and the highly acclaimed exiled author and poet Breyten Breytenbach. All publishing first in Afrikaans, these writers were increasingly politicised by the situation in South Africa and their contrasting experiences overseas, with Breytenbach beginning as one of the most linguistically radical new poets in Afrikaans. A new generation of white South African poets writing in English in the 1960s included greats such as Douglas Livingstone, Sidney Clouts, Ruth Miller, Lionel Abrahams and Stephen Gray.

With the rise of the Black Consciousness (BC) movement, led by martyred Bantu Steve Biko, and the 1976 Soweto uprising, political and protest poetry became a vehicle used for its immediacy of impact. South African protest poets took the platform at underground rallies, political, religious and other cultural events across the country. The most notable writers from this period are Keorapetse William Kgositsile, Mongane Wally Serote, Sipho Sepamla, James Matthews, Oswald Joseph Mbuyiseni Mtshali, Christopher van Wyk, Mafika Gwala and Don Mattera. These rousing works, embedded with resistance slogans and ideals, were intended to mobilise the masses into action against the oppressive regime. Popular orators such as Mzwakhe Mbuli achieved celebrity status at this time even though some felt the need for "a move away from rhetoric and toward the depiction of ordinary" in order to reflect a more well-rounded view of humanity, as expressed by academic and poet Njabulo Ndebele, in his 1986 essay "The Rediscovery of the Ordinary". Simon Lewis, in his review of Ten South African Poets highlights that some of the strongest voices of the 1980s were also "worker poets", the innovative trade union praise-songs of the poets of Black Mamba Rising.

== Post-apartheid ==
With the demise of apartheid and the release of Nelson Mandela in 1990, many observed that South African writers were confronted with the challenge of what was now most pertinent to write about, even though the after-effects of this history evidently still live on in the society. The "new South African" democratic era was characterised by what literary critic Stephane Serge Ibinga in her article "Post-Apartheid Literature Beyond Race" describes as "honeymoon literature" or "the literature of celebration", epitomised by Zakes Mda, who was active as a playwright and poet long before publishing his first novel in 1995. Poets of this relatively stable transition period in South African history also include more irreverent voices such as Lesego Rampolokeng, Sandile Dikeni and Lefifi Tladi, founder of the Dashiki performance poetry movement in the late 1960s. Another prevalent theme of post-apartheid poetry is the focus on nation-building, with many poets and other writers re-evaluating past identities and embracing notions of reconciliation in order to reflect authentically an inclusive concept of South Africa as a nation, a diverse people united in a commitment to heal the past and collectively address imbalances.

== Contemporary poetry ==
The genre of performance poetry in present-day South Africa, encompassing the "pop culture" form of the spoken word, evidently has its roots in the indigenous praise poetry traditions of izibongo or lithoko as well as the combined influence of protest poets of the 1970s through to the 1990s, who often collaborated with or were musicians themselves, and American hip-hop culture and rap music coming to popularity across the country in the 1980s. Poets such as Lesego Rampolokeng, Lebogang Mashile, Kgafela oa Magogodi, Blaq Pearl, Jessica Mbangeni and Mak Manaka are household names in the genre. A number of performance poetry collectives have come to the fore over the past decade such as WEAVE (Women's Education & Artistic Voice Expression), And The Word Was Woman Ensemble (initiated by performance poet Malika Ndlovu), Basadzi Voices and poetry quartet Feelah Sista. The staging of professional performances, exposure via national and international poetry and spoken word festivals such as Urban Voices, Poetry Africa, Badilisha Poetry X-Change and more recently the Badalisha Poetry website, a podcast platform and pan-African poetry database, have cultivated an appreciation of South African and African poetry within the country and around the world.

The emergence of several independent publishers and self-publishing avenues, along with new literary magazines, e-zines, arts–related blogs and websites such as Poetry International - SA, Book SA, and Litnet via the internet, have all dramatically impacted on South Africa's literary landscape. Established mainstream publishers, local and international university presses have also opened channels for new and diverse South African poetic voices, notably Random Struik's Umuzi, NB Publishers' Kwela Books, Jacana Media, new feminist press Modjaji Books (whose authors include Phillippa Yaa de Villiers, winner of the 2011 South African Literary Prize for poetry) and South Africa's oldest literary journal New Contrast.

== Some poets ==
The following are some poets in South Africa. The list is incomplete and inadequately captures the breadth and vibrancy of the poetry landscape in the country. For a more comprehensive listing, see List of South African poets.

=== Chris van Wyk ===
Chris van Wyk (1957 – 2014) was a South African children's book author, novelist and poet. Van Wyk is famous for his poem "In Detention" on the suspicious deaths that befell South African political prisoners during Apartheid. In 1976 he published a volume of poetry, It Is Time to Go Home (1979), that won the 1980 Olive Schreiner Prize. The book is characterized by the preoccupations of other Soweto poets such as Mongane Serote, Sipho Sepamla, and Mafika Gwala and employs the language of defiance and assertion in poetry that reveals at all times the Black Consciousness of the era.

=== Gert Vlok Nel ===
Gert Vlok Nel (born 1963) is a poet, singer, songwriter, troubadour. He has published one collection of poems, Om te lewe is onnatuurlik (To live is unnatural), for which he received the Ingrid Jonker Prize.

=== Lionel Abrahams ===
Lionel Abrahams (1928-2004) was a poet, novelist, editor, essayist, and publisher. Abrahams's work is largely philosophical, praising integrity and compassion. His poems are characterised by free verse with emotional strength.

=== Tatamkhulu Afrika ===
Although born in Egypt, Tatamkhulu Afrika (1920-2002) went to South Africa at an early age. His first volume of poetry, Nine Lives was published in 1991. Afrika's poetry is rich in natural imagery, and the mood of his poems differ, from simple and innocent to lonely and frightened.

=== Gabeba Baderoon ===
Gabeba Baderoon is the 2005 recipient of the DaimlerChrysler Award for South African Poetry. She was born in Port Elizabeth, South Africa, on 21 February 1969. She currently lives and works in Cape Town, South Africa, and Pennsylvania, US. In 1989 she received her Bachelor of Arts in English and psychology from the University of Cape Town. In 1991 she received her BA honours degree in English (First Class) from the University of Cape Town. She attained her Master of Arts in English with distinction at the University of Cape Town in Postmodernist Television (Media Studies) and in 2004 completed her doctoral studies in media studies at the University of Cape Town, the same year spending time at the University of Sheffield, UK, as a visiting scholar. She also completed her dissertation entitled, "Oblique Figures: Representations of Islam in South African Media and Culture."

=== Michael Cope ===
The son of writer Jack Cope, Michael Cope (born 1952) is a jeweller and novelist as well as a poet. His first volume of poetry, Scenes and Visions, was published in 1990. His works detail people, their stories, and environmental imagery. Much of his poetry also quietly offers Cope's views on world-wide issues, such as business and poverty. Cope's second volume, GHAAP: Sonnets from the Northern Cape (Kwela and Snailpress) deals with human origins. His poetry is available online at Also by Michael Cope: Goldin: A Tale (iUniverse, 2005), a literary novel dealing with the mythic; and Intricacy: A Meditation on Memory (Double Storey, 2005), a memoir investigating memory.

=== Patrick Cullinan ===
Patrick Cullinan (born 1932) has published 50,000 volumes of poetry, an anthology on the work of Lionel Abrahams, a biography of Robert Jacob Gordon, and a novel, Matrix. Born in Pretoria, he was educated in Johannesburg and Europe. Cullinan's poetic style is dreamy and full of imagery, with a recurring theme of love. He was given the title cavaliere in 2003 by the government of Italy for his work translating much of his poetry into Italian.

=== Mzi Mahola ===
Mzi Mahola was born on 12 February 1949 as Mzikayise Winston Mahola. Mzi Mahola is his nom de plume. He started writing while he was at school. The Special Branch confiscated his first poetry manuscript in 1976 and he lost interest in writing for twelve years. After this period he started writing again, submitting work successfully to national and international journals, magazines and publications. His work has been published in more than eight anthologies.

=== Patricia Schonstein ===
Patricia Schonstein, also published as Patricia Schonstein Pinnock (born 1952), is a novelist as well as a poet. She is the curator of the Poetry in McGregor anthologies and the Africa! anthologies. She attained a Master of Arts in Creative Writing from the University of Cape Town under supervision of the Nobel laureate JM Coetzee. Her collection, The Unknown Child has been endorsed by both JM Coetzee and Archbishop Emeritus Desmond Tutu.

== See also ==
- Dertigers
- Hertzog Prize
- Ingrid Jonker Prize
- List of South African poets
- List of South African writers
- South African literature
- Tweede Asem
