= Central News Agency Literary Award =

South African annual award

The Central News Agency Literary Award (CNA Literary Award, CNA Prize) was a major annual literary award in South Africa. It was named for the CNA chain of bookstores. Founded by Phillip Stein, it recognised works in prose and poetry, and in both the English language and Afrikaans.

The last award was presented in 1996, although CNA later launched a "Book of the Year" award for popular bestsellers of any genre.

== Past winners (incomplete list) ==
This list is based on multiple sources that may contain errors.

| | English Prize | | Afrikaans Prize | |
| Year | Recipient | Title | Recipient | Title |
|---|---|---|---|---|
| 1996 | Sarah Ruden | Other Places | | |
| 1995 | Margaret McCord | The Calling of Katie Makanye | | |
| 1994 | | | Karel Schoeman | Hierdie Lewe |
| 1993 | Nelson Mandela | Long Walk to Freedom | Chris Barnard | Moerland |
| 1992 | Damon Galgut | The Beautiful Screaming of Pigs | | |
| 1991 | | | John Miles | Kroniek uit die Doofpot: Polisieroman |
| 1990 | Nadine Gordimer | My Son's Story | | |
| 1989 | Christopher Hope | White Boy Running | | |
| 1986 | Etienne van Heerden | Ancestral Voices | | |
| 1985 | Ellen Kuzwayo | Call Me Woman | T.T. Cloete | Allotroop |
| 1984 | Douglas Livingstone | Selected Poems | Wilma Stockenström | Monsterverse |
| 1983 | J. M. Coetzee | Life and Times of Michael K | Breyton Breytenbach | (YK): Die vierde bundel van die ongedanste dans |
| 1982 | André Brink | A Chain of Voices | Elisabeth Eybers | Bestand |
| 1981 | Nadine Gordimer | July's People | Sheila Cussons | Die Woedende Brood |
| 1980 | J. M. Coetzee | Waiting for the Barbarians | No award | |
| 1979 | Nadine Gordimer | Burger's Daughter | D.J. Opperman | Komas Uit 'N Bamboesstok |
| 1978 | André Brink | Rumours of Rain | Elsa Joubert | Die Swerfjare van Poppie Nongena |
| 1977 | J. M. Coetzee | In the Heart of the Country | Elisabeth Eybers | Einder |
| 1976 | Anthony Delius | Border | Etienne Leroux | Magersfontein, O Magersfontein! |
| 1975 | Guy Butler | Selected Poems | Anna M Louw | Kroniek van Perdepoort |
| 1974 | Nadine Gordimer | The Conservationist | Leon Rousseau | Die Groot Verlange |
| 1973 | Alan Paton | Apartheid and the archbishop: The life and times of Geoffrey Clayton, Archbishop of Cape Town | Elisabeth Eybers | Kruis of Munt |
| 1972 | Sheila Meiring Fugard | The Castaways | Karel Schoeman | Na die Geliefde Land |
| 1971 | Jack Cope | The Rain Maker | Elsa Joubert P G du Plessis | Bonga Siener in die Suburbs |
| 1970 | John McIntosh | The Stonefish | Breyten Breytenbach | Lotus |
| 1969 | No award | | Breyten Breytenbach | Kouevuur |
| 1968 | Siegfried Stander | The Horse | Chris Barnard | Duiwel-in-die-bos |
| 1967 | Laurens van der Post | The Hunter and the Whale | Breyten Breytenbach | Die huis van die dowe |
| 1966 | Thelma Gutsche | No Ordinary Woman | Henriette Grové | Jaarringe |
| 1965 | Godfrey LeMay | British Supremacy in South Africa, 1899–1907 | André Brink | Olé |
| 1964 | Alan Paton | Hofmeyr | Etienne Leroux | Een vir Azazel |
| 1963 | Laurens van der Post | The Seed and the Sower | D.J. Opperman | Dolosse |
| 1962 | Mary Renault | The Bull from the Sea | N.P. van Wyk Louw | Tristia: en ander verse voorspeleren vlugte |
| 1961 | Siegfried Stander | The Desert Place | Chris Barnard | Bekende onrus |

== See also ==
- Alan Paton Award
- Amstel Playwright of the Year Award
- Hertzog Prize
- W.A. Hofmeyr Prize

== Notes ==
9 From the menu for the CNA Literary Awards for 1986
