= Marjorie Wallace (artist) =

Scottish artist working in South Africa (1925–2005)

- Born: Marjorie; 1925; Scottish
- Died: 26 June 2005 (aged 79–80)
- Citizenship: France
- Education: Royal Scottish Academy
- Alma mater: Edinburgh College of Art
- Occupations: Painter, artist
- Awards: Order of Ikhamanga

Marjorie Wallace OIB (1925 in Edinburgh – 26 June 2005 in Onrus, Western Cape) was a Scottish-born South African artist, known for her ties to the Sestigers literary movement.

Wallace trained at the Edinburgh College of Art, greatly impressing with her early work and becoming the youngest person to be elected to the Royal Scottish Academy.

She was awarded a travel grant to visit Europe and Italy when she graduated in 1947. At the end of her travels she settled in Montparnasse where she met the South African writer Jan Rabie and his fellow Afrikaners who eventually became known as the Sestigers, and included André Brink, Breyten Breytenbach, Etienne Leroux, Ingrid Jonker, Adam Small, Bartho Smit, Chris Barnard, Hennie Aucamp, Dolf van Niekerk, Abraham H. de Vries and Elsa Joubert.

Her painting technique involved uniformly coloured areas of oil, using a light and often bright palette. It was a style well-suited to the ambience of the Western Cape. She shied away from the abstraction popular during the 60s and 70s, and declared her preference for the human figure.
