= Die Brandwag =

Afrikaans illustrated magazine

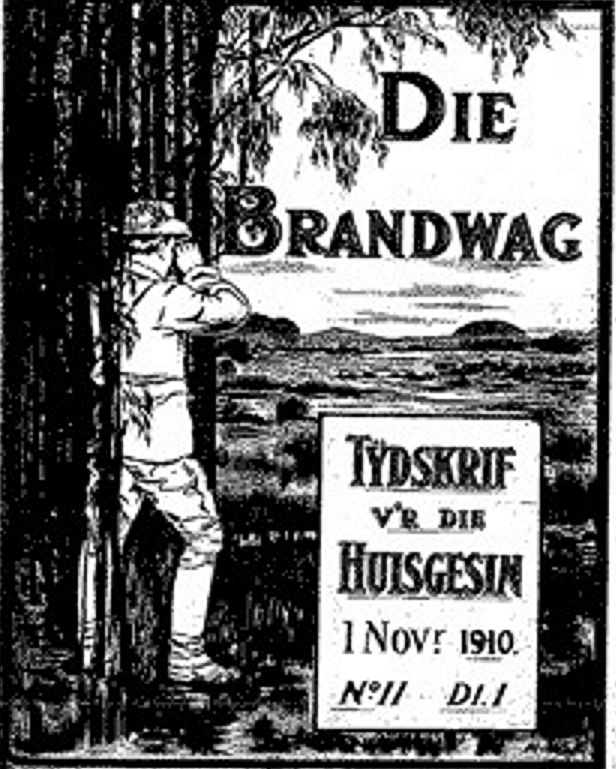
Cover of Die Brandwag from the first year of publication.

Die Brandwag was the first illustrated family magazine published in Afrikaans in the Transvaal, appearing monthly between 1910 and 1922 under the joint editorship of Dr W M R Malherbe and Gustav Preller. The first issue appeared on 31 May 1910 and the last in February 1922.

The magazine played an important role in the development of Afrikaans literature in the aftermath of the Boer War. It promoted a lively interest in the country's history through articles such as those written by Preller on the Voortrekkers. Informative essays on painting and sculpture appeared, with covers designed by artists such as Pierneef and Frans Oerder. For its time it maintained a high literary standard with contributions coming from the foremost Afrikaans poets and writers. These included Jan Celliers, Louis Leipoldt, Totius, Leon Mare and Jochem van Bruggen. From March 1920 'Die Banier', a scientific literary monthly, was issued as a supplement to 'Die Brandwag' and continued to appear for some years after 1922 when 'Die Brandwag' itself had ceased publication.

Die Nuwe Brandwag (The New Brandwag) was published over the period 1929 - November 1933 and was edited by Prof. M. L. du Toit and Pierneef. The place of its now defunct predecessor had largely been taken over by another magazine, Die Huisgenoot, so that the focus of Die Nuwe Brandwag was on literature and art of a high standard. Articles on music, sculpture and painting appeared regularly, with a large section devoted to art reproductions. It became a forum for original Afrikaans work in prose, poetry and drama, as well as hosting critiques on Afrikaans, Dutch and English literature, and is regarded by many as one of the best Afrikaans literary publications ever produced.

On 6 February 1937 Die Brandwag (1937-1965) reappeared as a weekly magazine, published by Afrikaanse Pers Bpk. as a supplement to the daily, Die Vaderland. In August 1937 it became independent under Otto Schwellnus as editor. Its first members of staff included well-known literary figures such as Elisabeth Eybers, Uys Krige and S. Ignatius Mocke. Among its first contributors were the household names of C. M. van den Heever, J. R. L. van Bruggen, N. P. van Wyk Louw, I. D. du Plessis, P. J. Nienaber and Sita de Kock. A. M. van Schoor succeeded Schwellnus, and was in turn replaced by Rud. P. Visser in 1945. The magazine began to feature mainly short stories and popular reading matter, and served as a nursery for thriller writers. In September 1948 the readership topped the 100 000 mark and the magazine had obviously come of age. Nonetheless, changes in editor and format led to its eventual demise in 1965.
