= South African State Theatre =

Theatre in Pretoria, South Africa

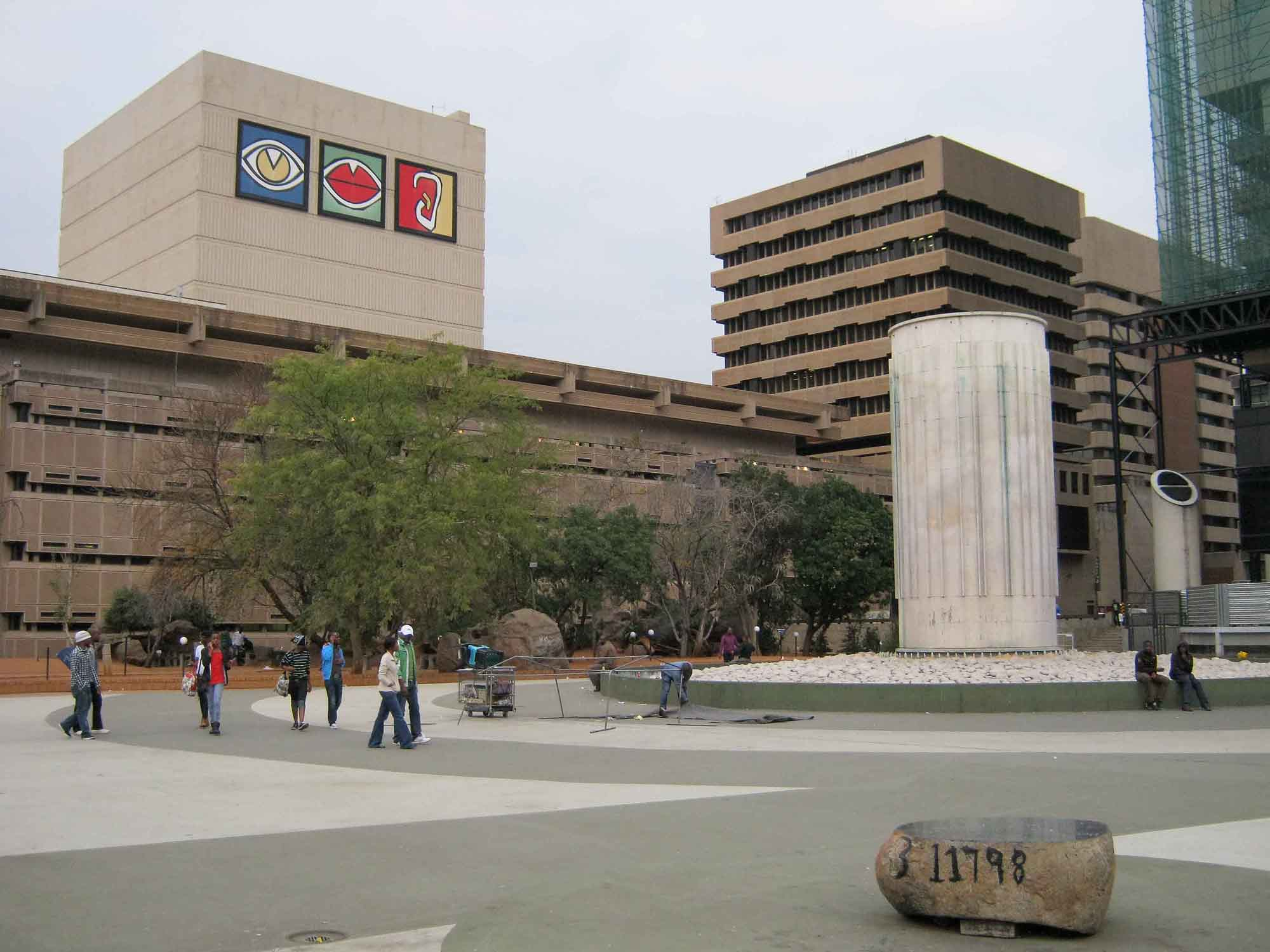
- Interactive map of South African State Theatre
- Former names: Pretoria State Theatre (1981-1999)
- Address: 320 Pretorius Street; Pretoria; South Africa
- Coordinates: 25.74676°S 28.19494°E

Construction
- Opened: 1981; 44 years ago

Website
- statetheatre.co.za

The State Theatre in Pretoria, South Africa is the largest theatre complex in Africa. It was known until 1999 as the Pretoria State Theatre.

== History ==
The theatre was built on the old Market Square in Pretoria for use by PACT (Performing Arts Council of Transvaal). It opened in 1981 with performances such as N. P. van Wyk Louw's Germanicus, Jochem van Bruggen's Ampie, and Arthur Miller's After the Fall. The first words on the new stage were spoken by veteran actor Siegfried Mynhardt.

In 1999, the National Arts Council of South Africa made a five-year agreement with Spoornet to name the theatre the Spoornet State Theater, through which it not only supported the theatre financially but also promoted the arts and key performers while exposing passengers to their work.

In 2000, the province of Gauteng decided to close the State Theatre over financial mismanagement. It reopened on April 4, 2001.

== Building ==
Seating 2,700, the complex covers 72,143 m². At first, there were four theatres: the Opera, Drama, Arena, and Studio venues. There were also several other rooms such as the Transvalia room, restaurant, cafeteria, where shows were occasionally presented. Today, there are six theatres, with the Momentum and Rendezvous adding to the total.
