= Sheila Cussons =

South African poet (1922–2004)

- Born: 9 August 1922; Piketberg, South Africa
- Died: 25 November 2004 (aged 82); Vredehoek, South Africa
- Occupations: Poet; Painter; Writer

Sheila Cussons (9 August 1922 – 25 November 2004) was an Afrikaans poet. She was born on the Moravia missionary station near Piketberg, South Africa, and, after matriculating from Afrikaanse Hoër Meisieskool, studied fine arts at the University of Natal in Pietermaritzburg. She was one of the most important poets in Afrikaans, besides an accomplished painter and artist.

The poet D.J. Opperman was influential in her decision to write in Afrikaans, while N. P. van Wyk Louw maintained prolonged correspondence with her, which they both considered as beneficial to their work. Nevertheless, she always deemed herself to be a visual artist in the first instance, and a poet second.

Publishing 11 volumes of poetry during her lifetime, she received the Ingrid Jonker Prize (1970), the Eugène Marais Prize (1971), the WA Hofmeyr Prize three times (1972, 1982 and 1991), the CNA Prize (1981), the Louis Luyt Prize (1982), and the prestigious Hertzog Prize in 1983.

She died in 2004 at the age of 82, at Nazareth House, a Catholic institution in Vredehoek.

== Volumes of poetry ==
- Plektrum (1970) ("Plectrum")
- Die swart kombuis (1978) ("The black kitchen")
- Verf en vlam (1978) ("Canvas and flame")
- Donderdag of Woensdag (1978) ("Thursday or Wednesday")
- Die skitterende wond (1979) ("The brilliant wound")
- Die sagte sprong (1979) ("The soft pounce")
- Die somerjood (1980) ("The summer jew")
- Die woedende brood (1981) ("The angry loaf")
- Omtoorvuur (1982) ("Transforming fire")
- Verwikkelde lyn (1983) ("Complicated line")
- Membraan (1984) ("Membrane")
- Poems: a selection (1985) (A selection of poems translated by the poet herself)
- Die heilige modder (1988) ("The sacred mud")
- Die knetterende woord (1990) ("The sonorescent word")
- 'n Engel deur my kop (1997) ("An angel through my mind")(A selection of Sheila Cussons' religious poems compiled by Amanda Botha)
- Die asem wat ekstase is (2000) ("The breath that is ecstasy")(A selection of Sheila Cussons' non-religious poems compiled by Amanda Botha)
- Versamelde gedigte (2006) ("Complete poems")
- Teesuiker (1983) (Verwikkelnde lyne)

== Fiction ==
- Gestaltes 1947 (1982) ("Figures")

== As translator ==
- Die vorm van die swaard en ander verhale (1981) ("The shape of the sword and other stories") (Cussons' translations of short stories by Jorge Luis Borges)
