= Groede =

- Village
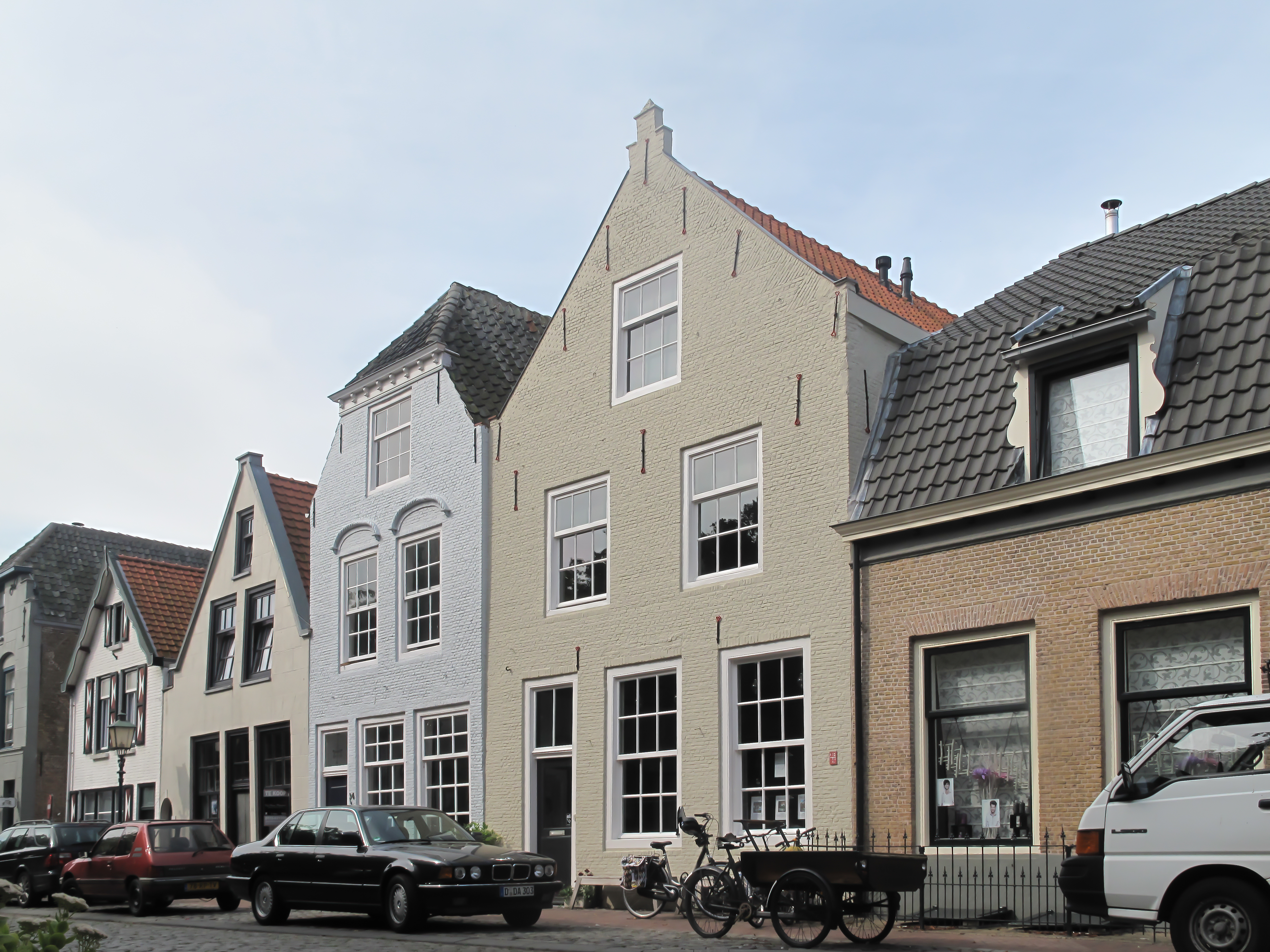
- Monumental houses in 2011

- Coat of arms

- Location of Groede in Zeeland in the Netherlands Groede (Netherlands)
- Coordinates: 51°22′44″N 3°30′25″E
- Country: Netherlands
- Province: Zeeland
- Municipality: Sluis

Area
  - Total: 19.60 km^{2} (7.57 sq mi)
- Elevation: 1.6 m (5.2 ft)

Population (2021)
  - Total: 940
  - Density: 48/km^{2} (120/sq mi)
- Time zone: UTC+1 (CET)
  - Summer (DST): UTC+2 (CEST)
- Postal code: 4503
- Dialing code: 0117

Groede (Dutch pronunciation: [ˈɣrudə]) is a village in the Dutch province of Zeeland. It is located about 5 km north of Oostburg in the municipality of Sluis.

== History ==
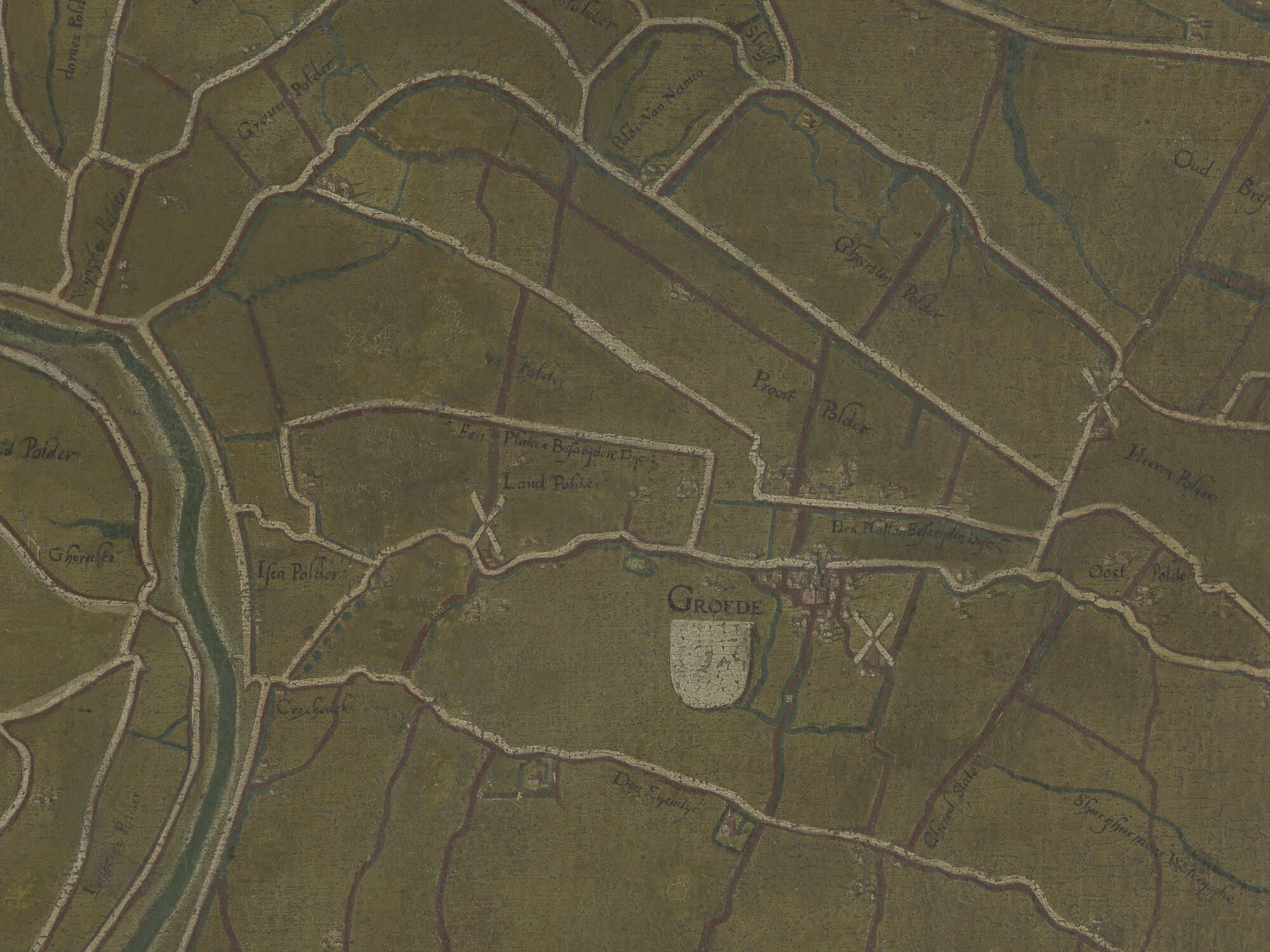
Groede on the map of the Liberty Of Bruges by Pieter Pourbus, 1571

The village was first mentioned in 1133 as Groede, and means "land accretion". The oldest village was lost in a flood in 1375. It was later polder, but inundated in 1583. In 1604, the area was conquered by the Dutch Republic. In 1612, it was a rediked, and a planned settlement with a large square containing the church in the middle was constructed.

The Dutch Reformed church is a three-aisled church with 13th century elements. The church was severely damaged during the inundation of 1583 to 1613. Restoration started in 1619. From 1618 until 1808, the southern part of the church was a Walloon church. The tower was struck by lightning in 1949 and restored in 1950.

Groede was home to 2,408 people in 1840. The village was spared during World War II, because it was a Red Cross village.

Groede was a separate municipality until 1970. In 2003, Groede became part of the municipality of Sluis. The Slijkstraat in the centre of the village was transformed into a Flemish heritage street in 1985.

== Gallery ==
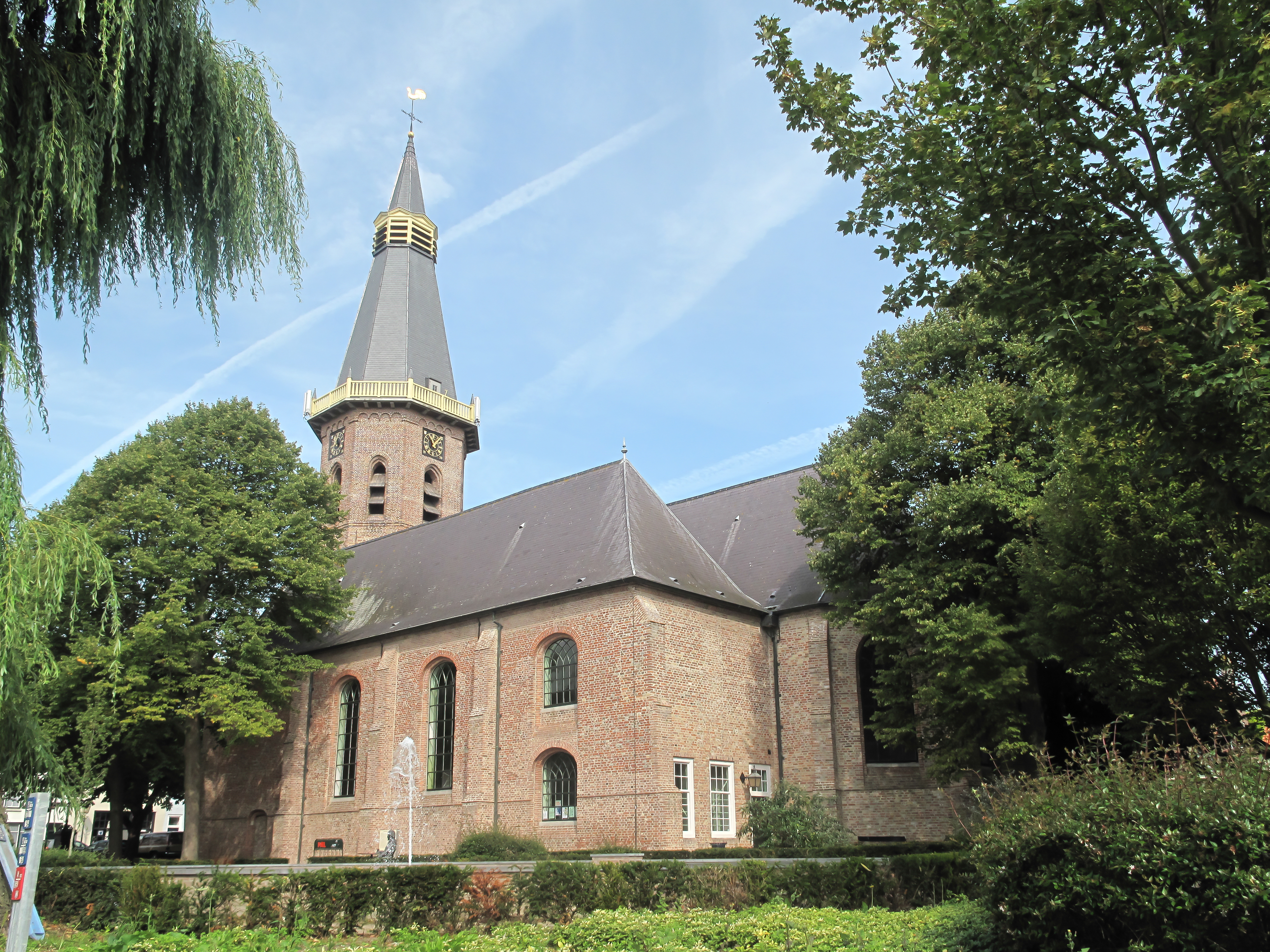
Groede, church: de Grote Kerk

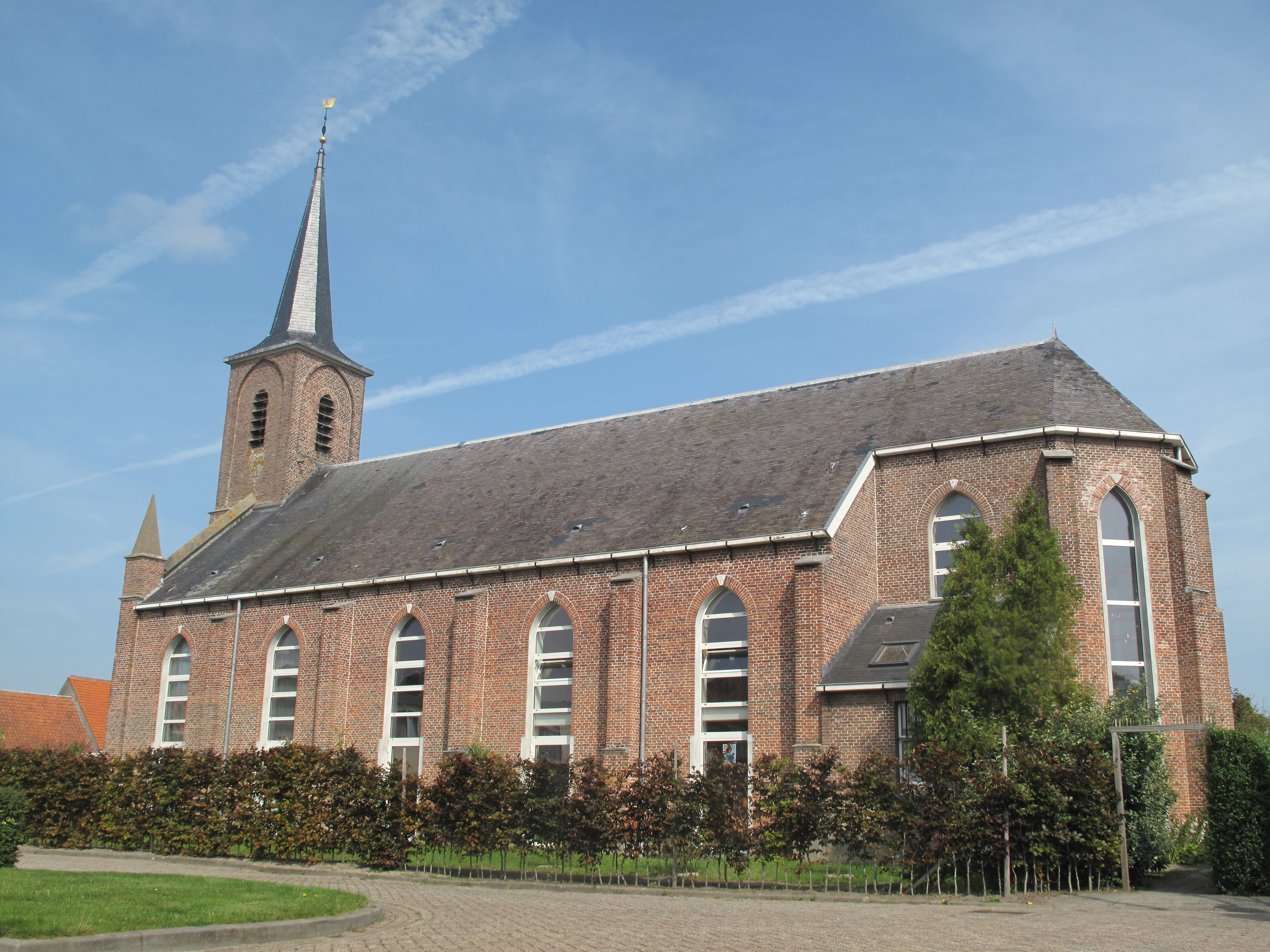
Groede, catholic church

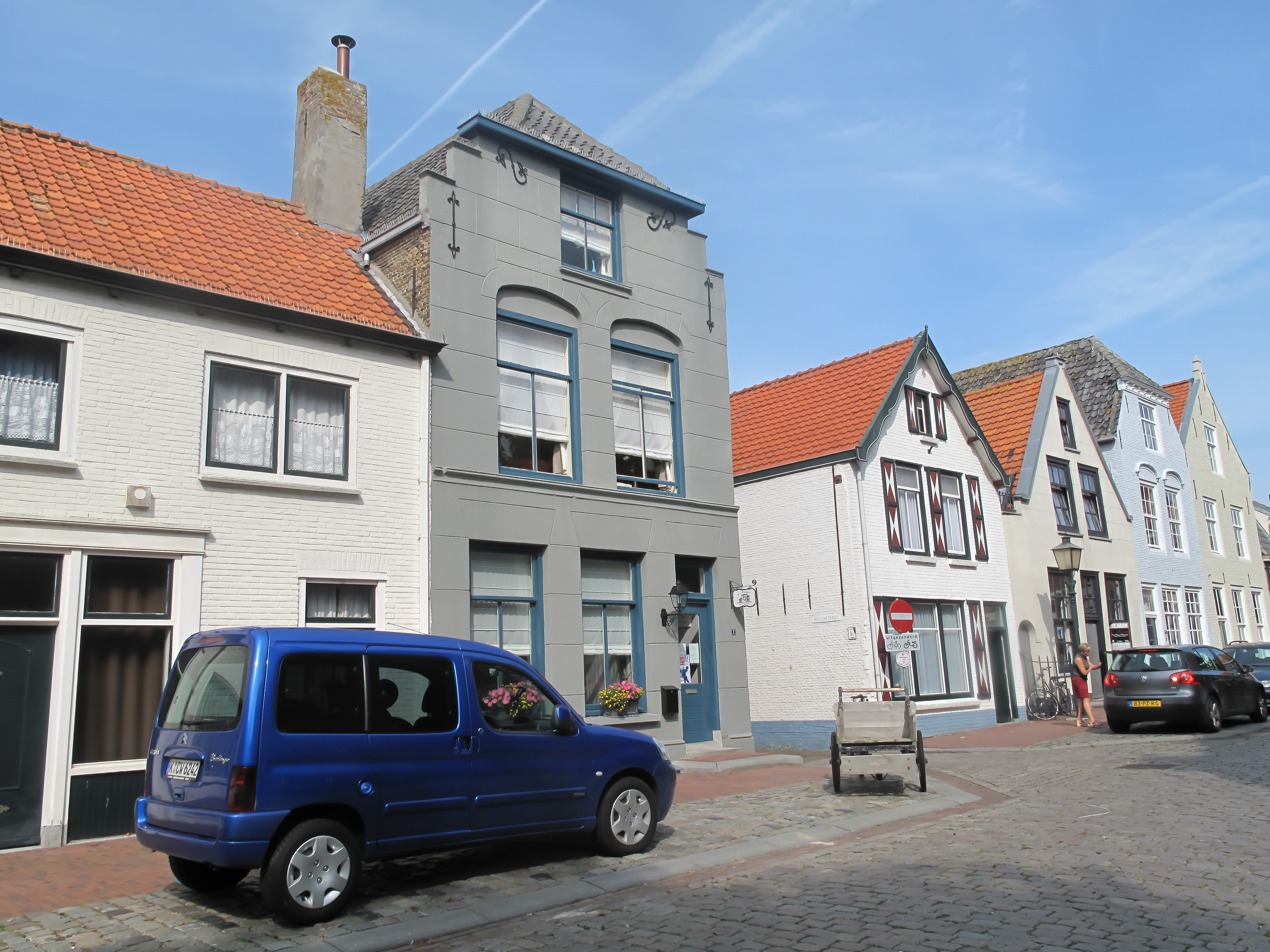
Groede, monumental houses

== Notable people ==
- Jochem van Bruggen (1881–1957), Dutch and Afrikaans author and poet, four-time winner of the Hertzog Prize
