= Wilma Stockenström =

South African writer, translator and actor (born 1933)

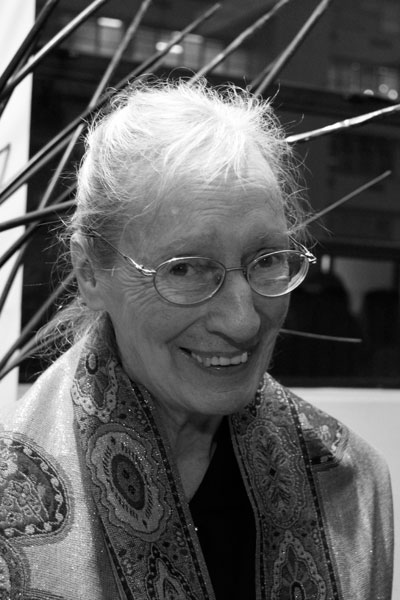
- Born: Wilma Johanna Stockenström; 7 August 1933 (age 93); Napier, Union of South Africa
- Citizenship: South African
- Education: Stellenbosch University
- Occupations: Writer, translator and actor
- Awards: Hertzog Prize; Grinzane Cavour Prize; SALA Literary Lifetime Award

Wilma Johanna Stockenström (born 7 August 1933) is a South African writer, translator, and actor. She writes in the Afrikaans language, and along with Sheila Cussons, Elisabeth Eybers, Antjie Krog and Ina Rousseau, she is one of the leading female writers in the language.

== Biography ==
She was born in Napier in the Overberg district of South Africa. After finishing high school, she studied at Stellenbosch University, where she obtained a BA in drama in 1952. She moved to Pretoria in 1954, and married the Estonian linguist Ants Kirsipuu. Stockenström has lived in Cape Town since 1993.

She is one of a handful of writers to have won the Hertzog prize in two different categories. She won it first for poetry in 1977 and then for fiction in 1991. Her 1981 novel Die kremetartekspedisie was translated into English by the Nobel Prize winner J. M. Coetzee under the title The Expedition to the Baobab Tree. Her work has also been translated into Dutch, French, German, Hebrew, Italian, Turkish and Swedish.

== Works ==
=== Poetry ===
- Vir die bysiende leser, Cape Town: Reijger, 1970
- Spieël van water, Cape Town: Human & Rousseau, 1973
- Van vergetelheid en van glans, Cape Town: Human & Rousseau, 1976
- Monsterverse, Cape Town: Human & Rousseau, 1984
- Die heengaanrefrein, Cape Town: Human & Rousseau, 1988
- Aan die Kaap geskryf, Cape Town: Human & Rousseau, 1994
- Spesmase, Cape Town: Human & Rousseau, 1999
- Die Stomme Aarde: 'n Keur, Cape Town: Human & Rousseau, 2007
- The Wisdom of Water: A Selection (translated by Johann de Lange), Cape Town: Human & Rousseau, 2007
- Skoelapperheuwel, skoelappervrou, New York & Pretoria: Ombondi, 1988/2011
- Hierdie mens, Cape Town: Human & Rousseau, 2013

=== Prose ===
- Uitdraai, Cape Town: Human & Rousseau, 1976
- Eers Linkie dan Johanna, Cape Town: Human & Rousseau, 1979
- Die kremetartekspedisie, Cape Town: Human & Rousseau, 1981
- The Expedition to the Baobab Tree (translated by J. M. Coetzee), Cape Town: Human & Rousseau, 1983; Brooklyn, NY: Archipelago Books, 2015, ISBN 978-1-935744-92-4
- Kaapse rekwisiete, Cape Town: Human & Rousseau, 1987
- Abjater wat so lag, Cape Town: Human & Rousseau, 1991

== Drama ==
- Dawid die dik dom kat: ’n kindertoneelstuk, Johannesburg: DALRO, 1971
- Trippens se patatta, Johannesburg: DALRO, 1971
- Laaste middagmaal, Johannesburg: Taurus, 1978

== Awards ==
- 1977: Hertzog Prize for Poetry for Van vergetelheid en van glans
- 1984: CNA, Louis Luyt and Ou Mutual Prizes for Monsterverse
- 1988: Grinzane Cavour Prize for Spedizione al Baobab
- 1991: WA Hofmeyr and Hertzog Prizes for Abjater wat so lag
- 2008: SALA Literary Lifetime Award
