= Trienke Laurie =

South African writer (1946–2023)

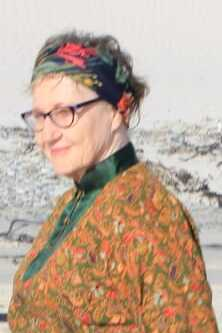
- Born: Catherina Elizabeth Opperman; 10 May 1946; Cape Town, South Africa
- Died: 2 October 2023 (aged 77); Franskraal, Western Cape, South Africa
- Occupation: Poet
- Spouse: Dirk Laurie
- Children: 5
- Parent(s): D.J. Opperman; Marié van Reenen
- Writing career
- Language: Afrikaans
- Notable works: Skietspoel; Sonskyf
- Notable awards: Ingrid Jonker-prize

Van My Ouma 'n groet by Trienke Laurie

Trienke Laurie (10 May 1946 – 2 October 2023) was a South African poet. She received the Ingrid Jonker-prize in 1999.

== Early life and education ==
Catherine Elizabeth (Trienke) Laurie was born in Cape Town on 10 May 1946. She was the eldest child and one of three daughters of D.J. Opperman, the famous poet, and Marié van Reenen, famous writer of Zulu fairy tales. Her sisters are Heila Marié and Diederi Joanne. Her mother finds the name Catherine too English and therefore calls her Trienke, which then becomes her first name. She went to school at Hoërskool Jan van Riebeeck in Cape Town and matriculated in 1963 at Bloemhof High School, Stellenbosch. From 1964 she pursued studies in Art Methodology at the Stellenbosch University, where she obtained a B.A. degree. She also obtained an Education Diploma as a high school teacher in Afrikaans, History and Art. At this time, she forms part of her father's famous Literary Laboratory.

== Career ==
Laurie taught school in Vredendal for a year, after which she married the mathematician Dirk Laurie on 21 December 1968. Five sons (Henri, Diederik, Dirk Pieter, Van Reenen and Kestell) were born. After the wedding, she becomes a homemaker and, besides raising children, she keeps busy with painting, giving art classes and writing children's poetry. The family lived in Pretoria for fifteen years and then moved to Vanderbijlpark, where her husband became a professor of mathematics at the Vaal Triangle campus of Potchefstroom University. Here they stay for seventeen years. After the children grew up, in 1990 she resumed her studies towards a B.A. Honors degree in Afrikaans and Dutch, which she obtained with honours in 1991 at the Potchefstroom University for Christian Higher Education. She is well known as a painter and has already held several exhibitions of her artwork.

== Personal life ==
After retirement, she and her husband moved to Somerset West.

Her husband, Dirk, died in 2019. She died at Franskraal in the Western Cape on 2 October 2023, at the age of 77.

== Publications ==
- 1997 – Skietspoel
- 1999 – Ek sien 'n rooi bul storm
- 2001 – Uitroep
- 2007 – Sonskyf
- 2010 – Van my ouma 'n groet (Children's verses with illustrations)
- 2017 – Koebesie (European travel verses with illustrations)
