= Sestigers =

Afrikaans writers' movement

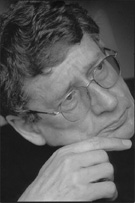
Brink in 1999

The Sestigers (Sixtiers), also known as the Beweging van Sestig ("the movement of the sixties"), were a dissident literary movement of Afrikaans-language poets and writers in South Africa under apartheid. The movement was started in the beachside Cape Town suburb of Clifton during the early 1960s by André Brink and Breyten Breytenbach, under the mentorship of Uys Krige and Jack Cope, and in continuation of a tradition in South African literature pioneered in the 1920s by Roy Campbell, William Plomer, and Laurens van der Post.

The Sestigers sought to elevate Afrikaans as a literary language and use it as a medium for speaking truth to power against the extreme Afrikaner nationalist and white supremacist National Party and its policies of both Apartheid and censorship in South Africa.

Die Sestigers also included Reza de Wet, Etienne Leroux, Jan Rabie, Ingrid Jonker, Adam Small, Bartho Smit, Chris Barnard, Hennie Aucamp, Dolf van Niekerk, Abraham H. de Vries, and Elsa Joubert. These writers had often studied abroad (mainly in Paris) and under the widespread influence of existentialism attempted to face the innocent writing of Afrikaans literature. Thus they aimed at a dissident literature in both prose and poetry by emulating both European literary modernism and postmodernism to tackle the political, cultural, and sexual problems of South Africa under apartheid and eventually led to a phenomenal growth in the Afrikaans art in later decades. Judy H. Gardner has called the prose and poetry of die Sestigers, "literature in exile in its own country". In her biography of dissident poet Ingrid Jonker, Louise Viljoen called die Sestigers, "a cultural revolt within the heart of Afrikanerdom".

== See also ==
- Afrikaans literature
- Sixtiers, a similar movement in the USSR
