= Elise Muller =

South African writer and editor (1919–1985)

- Born: Elizabeth Muller; 11 March 1919; Ceres, Western Cape, South Africa
- Died: 5 November 1985 (aged 66); Cape Town, South Africa
- Language: Afrikaans
- Notable awards: Hertzog Prize

Elizabeth (Elise) Muller (11 March 1919 – 5 November 1985) was a South African writer and editor of Afrikaans origin. She was born in Ceres, Western Cape and enrolled at the University of Stellenbosch but had to withdraw early on due to the onset of tuberculosis. The prolonged period of enforced rest turned her towards writing. Literary success came gradually, and she won the Hertzog Prize in 1957 for her short story collection Die vrou op die skuit.

Her health improved dramatically after the removal of a lung in 1950. She spent many years as an editor at the Dutch Reformed Church publishers NG Kerkuitgewers. She retired in 1978 and died in Cape Town in 1985.
