= Bartho Smit =

South African writer (1924–1986)

- Born: Bartholomeus Jacobus Smit; 15 July 1924 Klerkskraal, near Ventersdorp, South Africa
- Died: 31 December 1986 (aged 62) Melville, Gauteng
- Occupation: author, dramatist
- Notable awards: Hertzog Prize; Perskor Prize; Encyclopædia Britannica Award
- Spouse: Kita Redelinghuys

Bartho Smit (15 July 1924 – 31 December 1986) was a South African writer, poet, dramatist and director. He was a member of the Sestigers, a group of influential Afrikaans writers of the 1960s. He wrote Moeder Hanna ("Mother Hanna") in 1959, which was an acclaimed drama about the Second Boer War. In 1962, he wrote the play Putsonderwater ("Well Without Water"), but it could not be performed in South Africa because of its overly political message.

== Biography ==
Bartholomeus Jacobus Smit was born on 15 July 1924 in Klerkskraal, near Ventersdorp, South Africa. He matriculated in Standerton and graduated from the University of Pretoria in 1949 with a bachelor's degree and in 1951 obtained a Master of Arts degree from the same university. In 1949 he met actress Kita Redelinghuys and they married. From 1952 to 1957 they toured Paris, Munich and London as drama students under Jan Rabie. He also immersed himself in philosophy while in Europe.

His first publication was the story Outa Lukas, die natuurkind, which was published on 27 March 1941. In the forties he published stories and poems in magazines such as The Sentinel and Huisgenoot. In 1949 the publisher Unie-Boekhandel debuted his first book of poems, Mure: verse. He made his drama debut in 1955 with Moeder Hanna, but really attained public acclaim in 1962 with his play Putsonderwater. In 1978 he received the Hertzog Prize for drama for his body of work. In 1979 he won the Perskor Prize for Literature for Die Keiser. Also, in 1960, he received the Encyclopædia Britannica Award for the English translation of Die verminktes (The Maimed). He died on 31 December 1986 from cancer.

== Publications ==
=== Poetry ===
- Mure: verse. Unie-Boekhandel, 1949

=== Plays ===
- Moeder Hanna. Afrikaanse Persboekhandel, 1955
- Don Juan onder die boere. Human & Rousseau, 1960
- Die verminktes. Perskor, 1960
- Putsonderwater: ’n toneelstuk in vier dele. Afrikaanse Persboekhandel, 1962
- Die man met die lyk om sy nek: ’n moord-komedie. Afrikaanse Persboekhandel, 1967
- Christine. Tafelberg, 1971
- Die man met die alibi. Afrikaanse Persboekhandel, 1971
- Bacchus in die Boland. Perskor, 1974
- Die keisier: variasies op ’n sprokie van Hans Andersen. Perskor, 1977

=== Sketches ===
- Losgoed. Perskor, 1974
