= Frans Oerder =

Dutch-born South African artist (1867 - 1944)

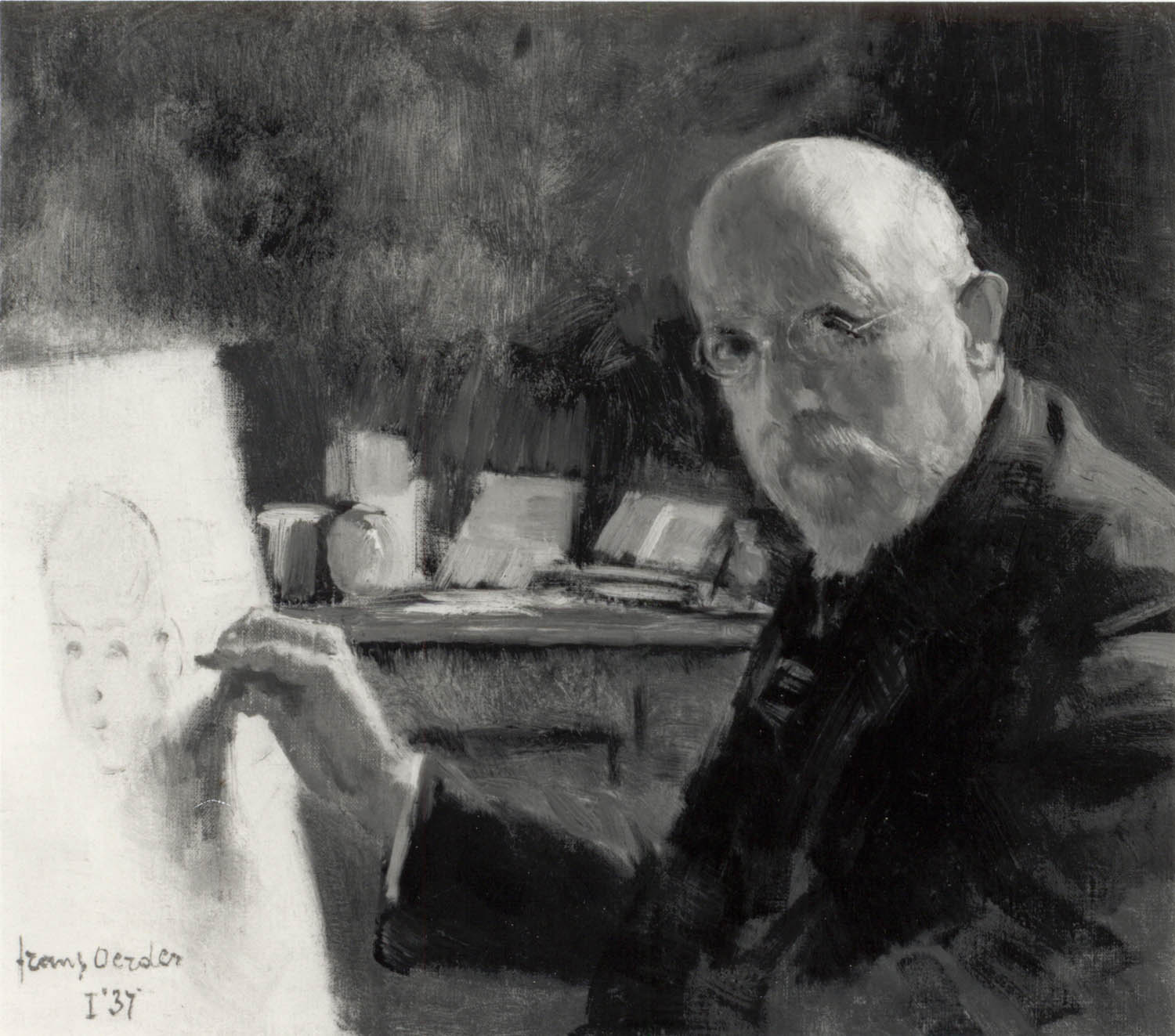
Self-portrait

Frans David Oerder (7 April 1867 – 15 July 1944) was a Dutch-born South African landscape, still-life and portrait painter, etcher, and lithographer.

He was born in Rotterdam. Frans was the youngest of seven children born to a municipal employee, Johannes Carolus Oerder. His father felt that art as a career was foolish, but agreed to his training as a decorator.

From 1880 to 1885, Oerder studied art at the Rotterdam Academy, winning the King William III Gold Medal and Bursary, later touring in Italy and studying in Brussels under Ernest Blanc-Garin (1843–1916) with the help of a small inheritance from his father.

Following his brother, he emigrated to the South African Republic in 1890, and initially worked as house painter and decorator for the firm of De Wyn & Engelenburg. Pressed by a shortage of work he entered the employ of the Zuid-Afrikaansche Spoorweg Maatschappij and painted poles along the Delagoa Bay railway line.

In the 1890s, Oerder was, along with Anton van Wouw and James Smith Moreland in Cape Town, one of only three artists in South Africa with recognised professional training. In 1894, he took up the position of art teacher at the Staatsmeisjesskool, which later became the Pretoria High School for Girls and at the same time rented a studio in Church Street East. He eked out a living by drawing newspaper cartoons and helping Anton van Wouw with commissions. A frequent visitor to the studio during this period was one of his art students, going by the name of J.H. Pierneef.

In 1896, Oerder went on a painting holiday to Zululand, and arranged an exhibition of his work in Cape Town.

With the outbreak of the Anglo-Boer War in 1899, he was appointed official war artist by President Paul Kruger. His sketches and paintings from this bitter period are held at the War Museum in Bloemfontein, the Africana Museum in Johannesburg and the art collection of the University of Pretoria.

In 1903, after the war, and no doubt still remembering his Zululand trip, Oerder travelled and painted along the East African coast, contracting malaria during the trip. He was elected a member of the South African Society of Artists in 1905, and with the tide finally turning in his favour, received several commissions to paint landscapes and portraits, such as that of General Louis Botha.

He found conditions difficult in postwar South Africa and in 1908 returned to the Netherlands via Italy. At first he settled in Brabant, but later moved to Amsterdam where he married a fellow painter, Gerda Pitlo, in 1910. Her interest in flower painting influenced him and he started on still life compositions, especially flower studies. His painting Magnolias was sold to the New York Graphic Society, becoming one of the most popular images ever and reproductions of this still life achieved record sales for the Society, Oerder receiving no royalties whatever. Oerder hadn't forgotten his ties to South Africa, and occasionally carried out commissions such as designing covers for the weekly magazine, Die Brandwag, and arranging an exhibition in Johannesburg.

He eventually returned to Pretoria with his wife in 1938. His work by now was widely acclaimed, and in a grand gesture the tower-room of the Pretoria City Hall was made available to him for use as a studio. Here he painted several important portraits, including that of Jan Smuts. He now had the time and inclination to travel and paint in the Cape Province, Natal and the Northern Transvaal.

Complications following on a bout of pneumonia left him debilitated, and he died in Pretoria in 1944. Throughout his career he had divided his output fairly evenly between landscape, portrait and still-life, with the Dutch influence always apparent.

== Gallery ==
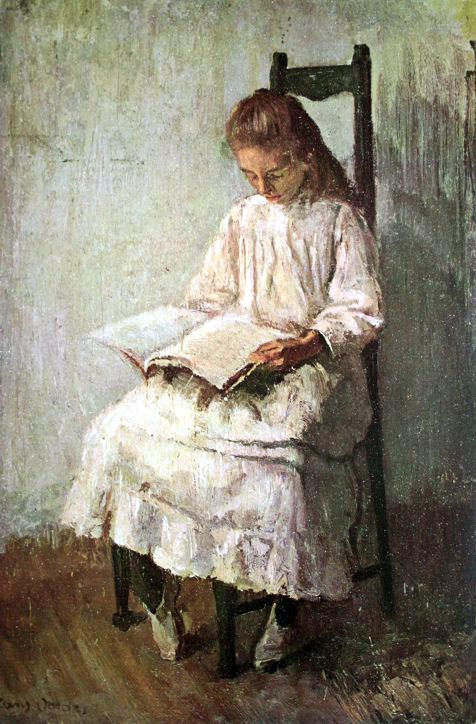
Meisie wat lees
/Girl reading

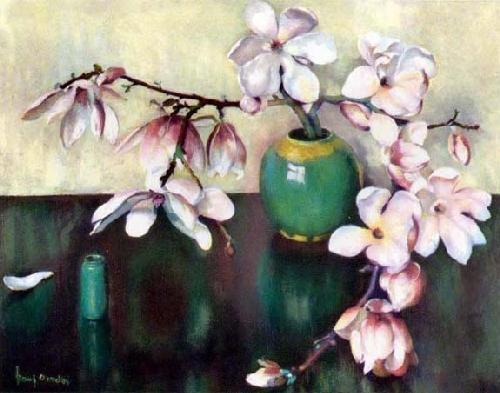
Magnolias

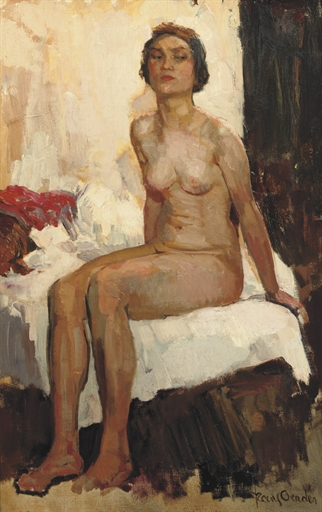
Nude figure

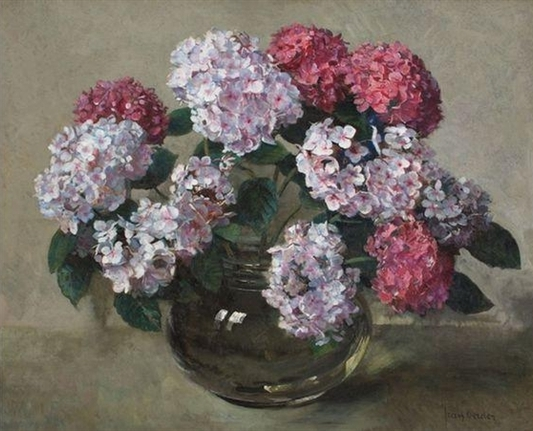
Hydrangeas in Glass Vase
