= Reza de Wet =

South African playwright

Reza de Wet (11 May 1952 – 27 January 2012) was a South African playwright known for her significant contributions to South African theatre.

De Wet was born in Senekal in the Free State of South Africa. She graduated from the University of Cape Town drama school and worked as an actress. She later obtained a master's degree in English literature and lectured in the drama department of Rhodes University in Grahamstown.

Over a span of fifteen years, De Wet wrote twelve plays, five in English and seven in Afrikaans. She won numerous awards for her work, including five Vita Awards, three Fleur du Cap Awards, and one Dalro Award. Her literary accolades include one CNA Prize, one Rapport Prize, and two Hertzog Prizes. Productions of her plays have garnered more than forty theatre awards. Her play Yelena won the Vita Award for Best Script in 1998–1999, and Drie Susters Twee, an Afrikaans adaptation of the Three Sisters, was named Best Production for the same year.

De Wet's play Diepe Grond is a notable work that premiered at the Market Theater in Johannesburg, a venue known for its opposition to apartheid. The play serves as a critique of the moral decay resulting from the country's racist policies. In 2024, a feature film adaptation titled WHITE DEVILS was directed by Gabriel Bologna.

De Wet died from leukaemia at her home on 27 January 2012.
