= Dertigers =

Group of poets in South Africa

The Dertigers, or "writers of the thirties," are a group of Afrikaans-language South African poets who achieved new heights of eloquence in the young language's early decades of the 20th century.

The Dertigers arose after the Tweede Asem ("Second Breath") writers of the first decades of the 20th century; the year of 1934 is often selected as the breakthrough date for the Dertigers: W.E.G. Louw's Die ryke dwaas ("The Rich Fool") appeared in that year. The Dertigers strove to write a more emotionally intense, soul-baring poetry than their predecessors. They eschewed gentlemanliness and bourgeois convention in order to produce a more honest and intimate poetry.

A further aim of the Dertigers was the effort to achieve a literary greatness that would make its mark in world literature. In an attempt to express their humanity to the fullest, the poetry of the Dertigers has a confessional quality in which the poet seems to be overheard in the midst of a prayer or confession. The resultant effect of these ambitious goals was a heightened respect for the professionalism of the poet; the choice of the precise word stood as an ever-present poetic goal. Nonetheless, the Dertigers continued to refine their language closer to the spreektaal, the "language of the people." While the descriptions of nature that characterized Tweede Asem poets remain, these depictions of the landscape are harnessed to attempts to create mood and atmosphere within the poet's own soul.

The leading figures of the Dertigers are the brothers N. P. van Wyk Louw and W. E. G. Louw, Uys Krige, and Elisabeth Eybers. Also associated with this movement are C. M. van den Heever, and I. D. du Plessis.
