= C. M. van den Heever =

Christiaan Maurits van den Heever, almost universally known C.M. van den Heever (27 February 1902 in the concentration camp near Norvalspont in Cape Province, now Northern Cape Province, South Africa – 8 July 1957), was an Afrikaans-language novelist, poet, essayist, and biographer.

Counted among the Dertigers, van den Heever is noted for his most famous novels: Somer ("Summer") and Laat vrugte ("Late Fruits"). The latter won the Hertzog Prize for prose in 1942.

Van den Heever studied at the University of the Free State in Bloemfontein and the University of Utrecht in the Netherlands. Upon his return to South Africa, he gained a teaching position at the University of the Free State. After completing his dissertation on the poet Totius, he finished his academic career at Witwatersrand University.

== Bibliography ==
- Juan Zarandona-Santiago Martin (trad.), "Verano. Clásico de la literatura afrikaans" de C.M. van den Heever, Valladolid (Spain), Publicaciones Universidad de Valladolid, 2002, ISBN 978-84-8448-185-0
