= Tweede Asem =

The Tweede Asem ("Second Breath") is a phase (c. 1917–1934) within Afrikaans-language poetry that came in the wake of the zenith of Afrikaans poetry that described the sufferings of the Anglo-Boer War. The term also encompasses the work of the so-called Twintigers ("writers of the twenties").

The giants of the war era, such as Totius, Jan F. E. Celliers, or C. Louis Leipoldt, having come more or less to terms with the past, began at this time to address topics such as religion or nature. Meanwhile, Eugene Marais, while a contemporary of the war poets, stands out by his choice of material. Younger poets who emerged during this era are Toon van der Heever, A. G. Visser, H. A. Fagan, A. D. Keet, J. R. L. van Bruggen, and Theo Wassenaar.

As the Anglo-Boer War receded into the past, however, the conflict remained a topic, but became rather a vehicle for the depiction of romanticized history, rather than a personal crucible that required the expression of suffering. As a result, the Twintigers remained overshadowed by their predecessors. In addition, they fade in importance to the growing professionalism of the succeeding generation, the Dertigers.

Nonetheless, the Twintigers can be credited with the development of the love poem and the cultivation of the nature poem in Afrikaans.
