= I. D. du Plessis =

South African poet (1900-1981)

- I. D. du Plessis
- Born: 25 June 1900; Cape Town, Cape Colony
- Died: 11 December 1981 (aged 81); Cape Town, South Africa
- Occupations: Poet, writer, lecturer

Izak David du Plessis, who published under the name I. D. du Plessis (25 June 1900, in Cape Town, Cape Colony – 11 December 1981 in Cape Town), was an Afrikaans-language writer. A successful writer in many genres, he is included among the Dertigers.

== Biography ==
Du Plessis was born on 25 June 1900 at Philipstown and received his education at Steynsburg, Petrusville and later at the Wynberg Boys' High School in Cape Town. After his studies at the University of Cape Town, he was for a time a teacher in Worcester, a journalist in the editorial board of Die Burger and Die Huisgenoot and then lecturer at the Cape Technical College. It was in these years that his interest arose in the social life and cultural products of the Malays. In 1932, he accepted an appointment as a lecturer at the University of Cape Town and in 1935 he was promoted with a thesis on the contribution of the Cape Malay to South African anthem. In the thirties he travelled much abroad, including Europe, East and South America. In 1948, he became head of the Institute of Malay Studies at the Cape Town University and from 1953 to 1963 he served as commissioner and later secretary and adviser for Coloured Affairs, a position that enabled him to advocate a particular vision for people the state labelled as Cape Malay.

Du Plessis was instrumental in ensuring that the Bo-Kaap remained a Cape Malay area, during Apartheid (which also resulted in the non-Malay residents being formally removed from the area in terms of the Group Areas Act). He also advocated for the establishment of the University of the Western Cape for so-called Coloured students, and he was the first Chancellor. In 1937 his anthologies Vreemde Liefde (Strange Love) en Ballades (Ballads) received the Hertzog Prize for poetry, while in 1962 he received the Scheepers award for Youth literature. From the University of Cape Town, he received an honorary degree. On 11 December 1981, he died in Cape Town.

== Publications ==
- Du Plessis, I.D. (1931). LIED VAN ALIE En Ander Gedigte. Cape Town: Nasionale Pers.
