= Dolf van Niekerk =

South-African author (1929–2022)

- Born: Rudolf Johannes van Niekerk; 22 February 1929 Edenburg, South Africa
- Died: 31 December 2022 (aged 93)
- Occupation: Author
- Notable awards: Eugène-Marais Prize; MER Prize; Scheepers Award for Youth Literature

Rudolf Johannes van Niekerk (known as Dolf) (22 February 1929 — 31 December 2022) was a South African author, dramatist, radio presenter and professor. He wrote in Afrikaans and was a member of the Sestigers group.

== Education ==
van Niekerk was born in Edenburg and matriculated at the Edenburg High School. In 1949 he was awarded a Bachelor of Arts degree by the University College of the Orange Free State in Bloemfontein, and in 1950 an honours degree in Philosophy at the University of South Africa (Unisa).

In 1967, he was awarded a Master of Arts degree by the University of Pretoria. In 1978, he became an Emeritus Professor of the University of Pretoria, a position he held until his retirement in 1994.

== Career ==
In 1950 he became a radio presenter and producer. In 1957, he became the head of the radio department for the Department of Agriculture, and later the Head of Radio for the whole broadcasting network.

van Niekerk's first work, a book of poems, Standpunte, was published in 1953. He also was writing prose and radio plays and writing for television. His novel Gannavlei was published in 1958. He was awarded the Eugène-Marais Prize in 1963, for his collection of short stories.

In 1986, he was awarded the MER Prize, and the Scheepers Award for Youth Literature, for the novel Die Haasvanger.

== Works ==
=== Prose ===
- Gannavlei: novel, Dagbreek-Boekhandel, 1958
- Die son struikel, Dagbreek-Boekhandel, 1960
- Skepsels, Afrikaanse Pers Boekhandel, 1963
- Die moeder, Nasionale Boekhandel, 1965
- Woord in die môre, Perskor, 1978
- Kort lewe van 'n reisiger, Tafelberg, 1979
- 'n Bietjie luisterkuier, Folio, 1983
- Koms van die hyreën, Tafelberg, 1994
- Koors, Tafelberg, 1997
- Brandoffer: vertellings uit die Tweede Vryheidsoorlog, Tafelberg, 1998
- Die aarde waarop ek loop, Lapa, 2003
- Kroniek van Turf, Protea Boekhuis, 2017

=== Drama (stage, television and radio) ===
- Kwart voor dagbreek: 'n verhoogspel in drie bedrywe, Afrikaanse Pers Boekhandel, 1961
- Die paddas: satiriese eenakter, Dalro, 1968
- Kamer 99, Perskor, 1972
- Die nagloper: twee tekste vir televisie, Human & Rousseau, 1976
- Niemand se dag nie, Perskor, 1982

=== Youth literature ===
- Skrik kom huis toe' Nasionale Boekhandel, 1968
- Karel Kousop, Tafelberg, 1985
- Die haasvanger, Tafelberg, 1985

=== Poetry ===
- Karoosange, Tafelberg, 1975
- Dubbelster, Tafelberg, 1996
- Nag op 'n kaal plein, Human & Rousseau, 2006
- Lang reis na Ithaka, Protea Boekhuis, 2009
- Bleek planet, Protea Boekhuis, 2013
- Portrette in my gang, Protea Boekhuis, 2015
