= Gustav Preller =

South African author and literary critic

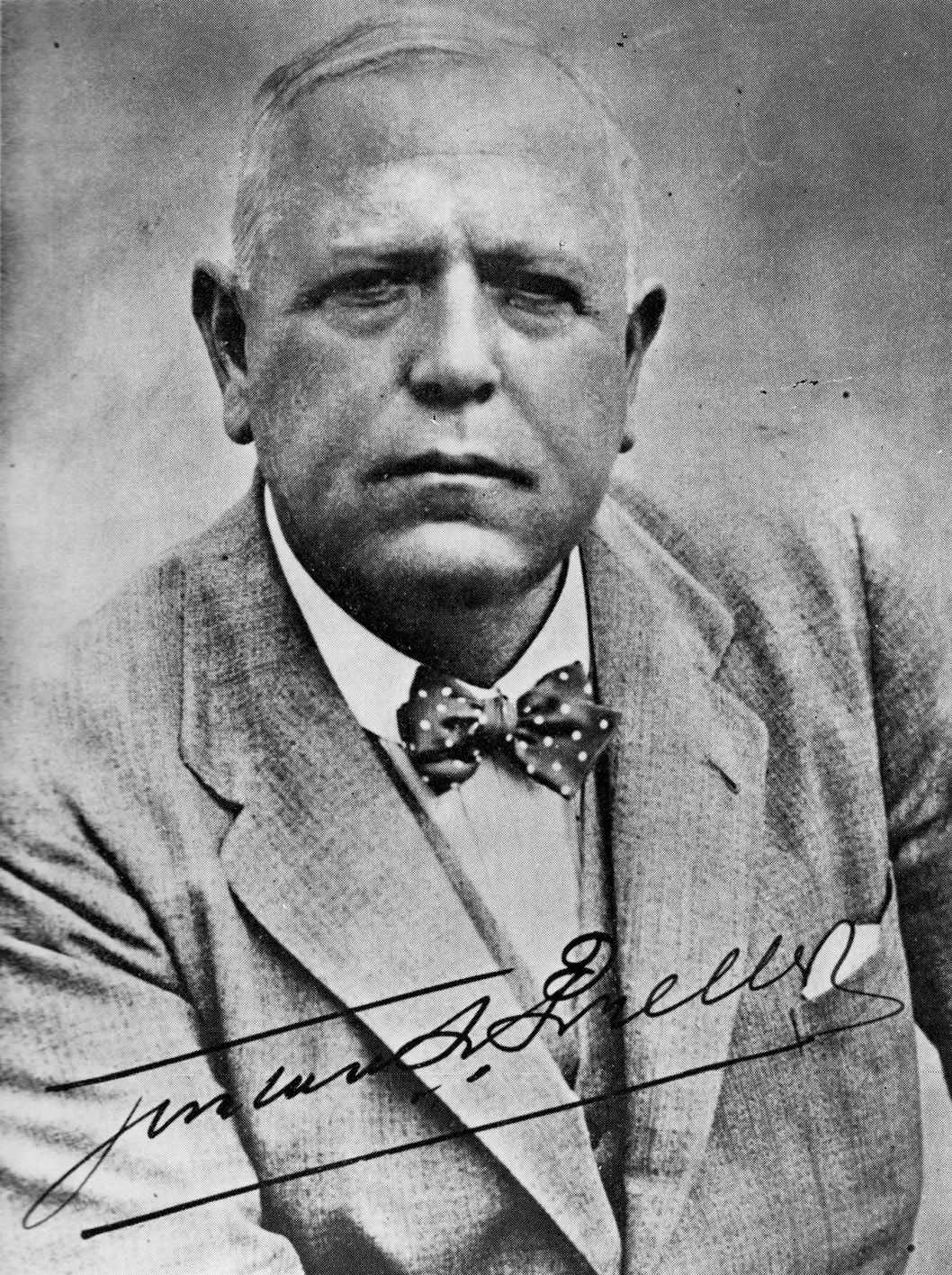
- Born: Gustav Schoeman Preller; 4 October 1875; Klein Schoemansdal, Klipdrift, Pretoria
- Died: 7 October 1943 (aged 68); Pelindaba, South Africa
- Known for: Author, editor and historian
- Spouse: Hannie Pretorius
- Parents: Robert Logie Preller (father); Stefina Schoeman (mother)

Gustav Schoeman Preller (4 October 1875 in Klein Schoemansdal, Klipdrift, Pretoria – 7 October 1943 in Pelindaba) was a journalist, historian, writer and literary critic. He fought for the recognition of Afrikaans. Preller helped the Afrikaner to realize the importance of the history of South Africa. He made great contributions to the writing of South African history, through his research and literature. He also contributed greatly to making South Africans aware of the legacy of the Voortrekkers and also played an early part in planning the Voortrekker Monument.

== Background ==
Gustav was the son of Comdt. Robert Logie Preller and Stefina Schoeman (daughter of the Voortrekker Gen. Stephanus Schoeman). His parents farmed near Standerton where he attended school for only 3 years. Later he worked in Pretoria as a shop-assistant, an articled clerk and a civil servant, studying diligently when he found the time. When the Boer War started, he was working as a clerk for the Department of Mines and would marry Johanna, the granddaughter of M. W. Pretorius (i.e. 'Swart Martiens', the cousin of M. W. Pretorius) and Deborah Retief, in 1898.

During the Anglo-Boer War, he was part of the Pretoria Commando serving in the artillery but was captured at Ermelo and sent to India as a prisoner of war. On his return to the Transvaal Colony in 1902 at the end of the war, there was no job for him at the Department of Mines and he considered emigrating to Argentina, but was offered the editorship of Land en Volk. By 1903 he was editor of De Volkstem, the mouthpiece of Louis Botha's future party, Het Volk. He increased the circulation from 2,000 to 20,000.

As a supporter of Louis Botha, he became a South African Party member from its creation in 1910 with the formation of the Union of South Africa. He was a South African Freemason.| He was editor of Die Brandwag magazine from 1910 until 1922. After the death of Botha in 1919 his loyalty wavered and he joined the National Party in 1925. He became editor of the party's mouthpiece, Ons Vaderland. During the period of his various editorships, he conducted historical research into the histories of the Boers in Natal and the Transvaal and the Great Trek and Anglo-Boer wars. In 1936, Preller was appointed as the state historian, a position he held until his death.

== Bibliography ==
Some of his works included,

- Piet Retief, 1906
- Voortrekkermense, 1918–38, six volumes of documents about the Great Trek
- Oorlogsoormag, 1923, study of the Anglo-Boer War
- Andries Pretorius, 1938
- Ons Parool, 1938
- Talana, Die Drie Generaals-slag by Dundee, met Lewensskets van Genl. Daniel Erasmus, 1942

== Legacy ==
The South African Academy of Science and Art (Afrikaans: Die Suid-Afrikaanse Akademie vir Wetenskap en Kuns) gives out the annual Gustav Preller Award, which has been awarded since 1909.
