= Henriette Grové =

South African writer

Personal details
- Born: Hester Henriette Venter; 26 September 1922 Potchefstroom, Western Transvaal, South Africa
- Died: 15 December 2009 (aged 87) Pretoria, Gauteng
- Spouse: Alewyn Petrus Grové
- Education: Potchefstroom Gimnasium
- Known for: Writer
- Her nom de plume is Linda Joubert

Hester Henriette Grové(née Venter) (26 September 1922 – 15 December 2009) was a South African writer of African origin. She was married to the literary critic A.P. Grové.

She is best known for her short stories and her plays. She is one of the few writers to have won the Hertzog Prize in multiple categories. Radiodramas are Die Glasdeur and Die Goeie Jaar. A drama Die Bokamer . A short story is Swart Haan, collected in for instance "Moderne Afrikaanse Verhaalkuns", byeengebring en toeglig deur Dr. F.E.F. Malherbe.
