= Jochem van Bruggen =

Afrikaans writer (1881–1957)

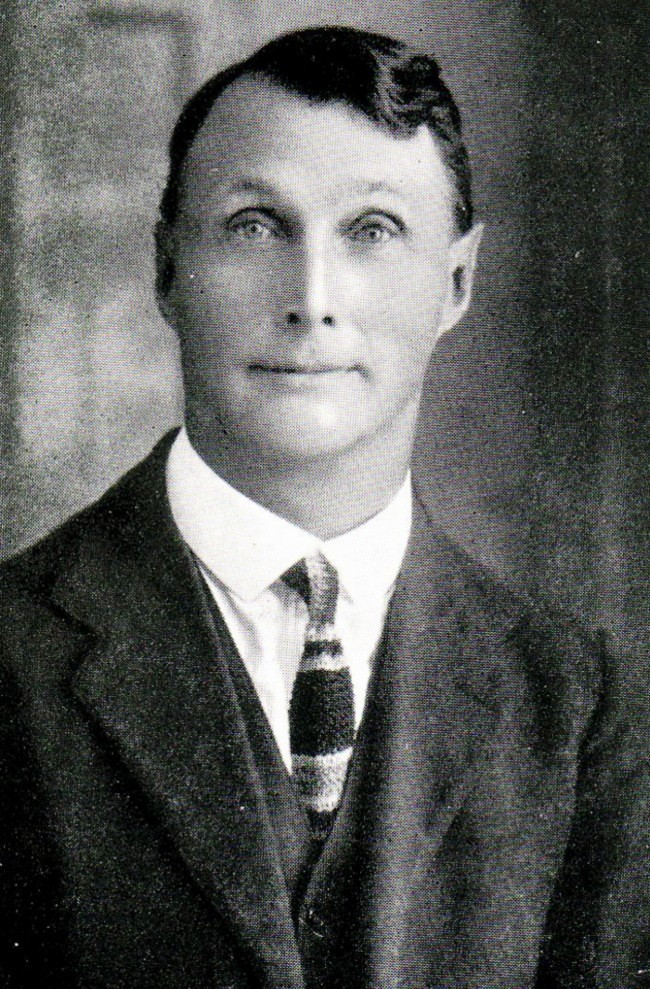
- Jochem van Bruggen
- Born: Jochem van Bruggen; 29 September 1881; Groede, Netherlands
- Died: 22 February 1957 (aged 75); Magaliesburg, South Africa
- Occupations: Novelist; Short story writer; Farmer
- Spouse: Maria Petronella Oosthuizen (m. 1906)
- Children: Lena; Jan; Nellie; Gert; Maria; Joggie
- Writing career
- Notable works: Teleurgestel (1916); Ampie: Die Natuurkind (1925); Ampie: Die Meisiekind (1927); Die Sprinkaanbeampte van Sluis (1933)
- Notable awards: Hertzog Prize for Afrikaans prose (1917, 1925, 1927, 1933)

Jochem van Bruggen (29 September 1881–22 February 1957) was an Afrikaans author and the first winner of the Hertzog Prize for prose for his work Teleurgestel ("Disappointed") in 1917. He was part of the Second Afrikaans Language Movement and is best known for Ampie, a series about poor and destitute Afrikaners in South Africa during the Depression of 1920–1921.

== Life and work ==
=== Early life ===
Jochem van Bruggen was born to Jan van Bruggen and Pieternella Drewes on 29 September 1881 in the town of Groede in the province of Zeeland, the Netherlands. He was the oldest of seven children, with four sisters and two brothers (one of whom would also become a well-known writer, known as "Kleinjan"). As a child, he developed a speech impediment while he was recovering from pneumonia, which made him withdrawn and slightly aloof as an adult.

His father came to South Africa from the Netherlands two years before the rest of the family, in an attempt to earn an income and prepare the way for the rest of the family to follow. He rented the old Dutch church building in Johannesburg as a residence and used the remaining space for teaching. By giving private lessons he earned reasonably well, even working as a Dutch teacher in an English school for a few months. Having settled in, he arranged for his family to join him in South Africa. Jochem and his mother, brothers and sisters arrived in Cape Town on New Year's Day 1893 and the family settled in Johannesburg. He initially attended his father's school, followed by the Nederlandstalige Staatsgymnasium in Pretoria, where Nico Hofmeyr, an author and lecturer in History and Dutch, had a great influence on him. Some of his earliest writing was published in the journal of the debating association of this school.

=== Second Boer War ===
At the outbreak of the Second Boer War, he joined the Boers as a volunteer and took part in the struggle until the capture of Johannesburg. His father was also on commando, but his mother and siblings were sent back to the Netherlands for their own safety. After the capture of Johannesburg, he first worked for a meager income at an agent's office and shortly after the peace agreement for a slightly better salary at a laundry. At this time he joined a debating society, with the chairman, a Dutch teacher, also being a skilled church choir conductor. The young Jochem took singing lessons from him and learnt much about the art of conducting. After the peace agreement, he went to live on the farm Steenkoppies near Magaliesburg, which belonged to Gert Oosthuizen, the father of an old schoolmate from the Staatsgymnasium, also called Gert. In 1905 he married Gert's sister, Maria, with whom he had six children.

=== Farming career ===
Together with his friend (and now brother-in-law), Gert, he started a tobacco farming business, but the business failed and by 1909 he was deep in debt and almost bankrupt. In his short story Ouboet, he refers to this difficult period in his life. Still, he remained on the farm as a farmer and during the following forty years he wrote almost all his works there. During the Depression, he took his plays on tour throughout the country to try to supplement his income, but the problems exceeded the opportunities and instead of the expected profits, he incurred further losses. He later wrote about this in detail in Met Ampie Deur die Depressie.

=== Community involvement ===
He renamed his portion of the farm Terrasse ("terraces"). Here he became very involved in the cultural life in his area and was the leader of various choirs over the years, as well as the director of a theatre society and chairman of a debating society. Several of the plays he wrote himself (among others Oom Kasper in Johannesburg) were performed by the theatre society. The societies petered out frequently, but were then reestablished by Van Bruggen, until they merged into the Magaliesburg Cultural Association in the 1940s, under independent management.

=== Death ===
Jochem van Bruggen died from hypostatic pneumonia and arteriosclerosis on 22 May 1957 on his farm Steenkoppies in the Magaliesburg area.

== Literature ==
=== Poetry ===
Van Bruggen already started attracting attention at school with his Dutch poetry. He published ten poems in total, alongside a number of Dutch prose pieces, including his mocking description of the heroic actions of the Johannesburgers during the Jameson Raid. His poems from this time overflowed with nationalistic pride and patriotism, but he also wrote a number of poems about nature. During this time he was also writing short plays, which were solemnly performed by his friends. He continued to write Dutch poems in the style of the Dutch preachers of the nineteenth century, but in 1912 he attempted in vain to find a publisher for the collection. From this point onwards he devoted himself almost exclusively to prose, although he did also write dramas on occasion.

=== Prose ===
Van Bruggen started seriously writing in 1914, with his first sketch, Die Praatmesien, being published in Die Brandwag on 10 December 1914. His first novel, Teleurgestel, followed in 1916, for which he won his first of four Hertzog Prizes. In 1919 he published a novella, Bywoners, followed by an anthology of short stories, Op Veld en Rante (1920) and another novella, Die Burgemeester van Slaplaagte (1922). Then, in 1924, came Ampie, the character with which Jochem van Bruggen truly entered the Afrikaans literature. The first part of the Ampie trilogy, Ampie: Die Natuurkind, depicts the childhood of this "dweller", how his love for Annekie begins to develop and his intense affection for the donkey, old Jakob.

== Honours ==
- Van Bruggen was awarded the first Hertzog Prize for prose, eventually winning it an unprecedented four times, the most by any author.
- With the publication of the seventh yearbook of the Afrikaanse Skrywerskring (writers' circle) in 1942, Jochem van Bruggen was the guest of honour at the celebratory dinner.
- The magazine Helikon also held a dinner in his honour in December 1953 and dedicated the Christmas issue of the magazine to him.
- The South African Academy of Science and Art honoured him with honorary membership in 1951.
- In 1953, the University of Pretoria awarded him an honorary doctorate in literature.
- In 1959, the Afrikaanse Skrywerskring placed a memorial plaque on his grave.

== Bibliography ==
| Title | Year | Category |
|---|---|---|
| Die Praatmesien | 1914 | Short story |
| Teleurgestel | 1916 | Novel |
| Bywoners | 1919 | Novella |
| Op Veld en Rante | 1920 | Short story anthology |
| Die Burgemeester van Slaplaagte | 1922 | Novella |
| Ampie: Die Natuurkind | 1924 | Novel |
| Ampie: Die Meisiekind | 1928 | Novel |
| Ampie: Toneelspel in Drie Bedrywe | 1930 | Theatre |
| In Die Gramadoelas | 1931 | Short story anthology |
| Booia | 1931 | Novel |
| Die Sprinkaanbeampte Van Sluis | 1933 | Novel |
| Haar Beproewing | 1934 | Novel |
| In Die Maalstroom: 'n Drama In Ses Bedrywe Uit Die Burgemeester Van Slaplaagte | 1934 | Theatre |
| Wraak | 1938 | Novel |
| Met Ampie Deur Die Depressie | 1939 | Novel |
| Die Noodlot | 1939 | Novel |
| Ampie: Die Kind | 1942 | Novel |
| Kranskop Deel 1: Oupa | 1943 | Novel |
| Die Damwal | 1945 | Novel |
| Stryd | 1949 | Novel |
| Haar Beproewing | 1950 | Novel |
| Karakters Op Ons Vlaktes: Keurverhale | 1952 | Short story anthology |
| Die Weduwee | 1956 | Novel |
| Karakters Op Ons Vlaktes | 1957 | Novel |
| Ampie: Die Trilogie | 1965 | Novel |
| Drie Prosastukke Van Jochem Van Bruggen | 1965 | Short story anthology |
