= D. J. Opperman =

South Africa poet (1914–1985)

D.J. Opperman
- Born: Diederik (Dirk) Johannes Opperman; 29 September 10; Natal Province
- Died: 22 September 1985 (aged 70); Stellenbosch, Western Cape, South Africa
- Citizenship: South African
- Occupation: Poet
- Spouse: Marié van Reenen
- Children: 3 daughters, including Trienke Laurie
- Writing career
- Language: Afrikaans

Diederik (or Dirk) Johannes Opperman, commonly referred to as D.J. Opperman (/ˈɔːpərmʌn/ 29 September 1914 – 22 September 1985) was a South African poet.

== Biography ==
He was born on 29 September 1914 in Dundee in Natal, where he grew up. He went to school in the towns of Estcourt and Vryheid, and afterwards received an M.A. degree from the University of Natal. He taught at schools in Pietermaritzburg and Johannesburg, and later on became editor of Die Huisgenoot. In 1949 he became a lecturer at the University of Cape Town. During this period he completed one of his most important publications – Digters van Dertig (Poets of the thirties) – in 1953.

He won the prestigious Hertzog prize for poetry in 1947 for his collection Heilige beeste ("Holy cattle"). From 1960 to 1975 he was a professor of Afrikaans at Stellenbosch University, where he also served on the editorial board of the publication Standpunte ("Points of View"). He died in 1985 in Stellenbosch.

He won four Hertzog prizes (in 1947, 1956, 1969 and 1980), four Hofmeyer prizes (in 1954, 1956, 1966 and 1980), two CNA Prizes (in 1964 and 1980), a prize from the "Drie-Eeue Stigting" ("Three Centuries Foundation") in 1956, the Louis Luyt-prize in 1980 and the Gustav Preller prize for literary criticism in 1985.

The South African composers Cromwell Everson and Prof Piet de Villiers wrote music for some of Opperman's poems, such as Kontraste and Nagstorm oor die see.

== List of works ==
=== Poetry ===
- Heilige Beeste ("Holy cows" 1945)
- Negester oor Ninevé ("Nine star over Niniveh"
- Joernaal van Jorik ("The Journal of Jorik" 1949)
- Engel uit die klip ("Angel from the Stone" 1948)
- Blom en baaierd ("Flower and Chaos" or "Flower and Rubble" 1948)
- Dolosse ("Large T-shaped concrete bollards used to curb waves breaking close to infrastructure" )
- Kuns-mis ("Fertilizer")
- Edms. Bpk ("Pty. Ltd")
- Komas uit 'n bamboesstok ("Comas from a Bamboo Pole" 1979)
- Sproeireën ("Tiny drops" 1987)

=== Verse plays ===
- Periandros van Korinthe ("Periandros of Corinth" 1954)
- Vergelegen (A place name, lit. "faraway" 1956)
- Voëlvry ("Outlaw"; lit. "bird-free" 1987)

=== Essays on literature ===
- Wiggelstok ("Divining rod")
- Naaldekoker Daggaroker ("Dragonfly")
- Verspreide opstelle ("Spread-out essays" – the direct opposite of "Collected essays" in Afrikaans)

== Poetry Translations ==
=== Sproeireën ===
Tiny Drops - 1987

"My girlfriend is in a tangerine,
my grandmother in cinnamon,
there's someone...someone in aniseed,
there's a woman in every aroma!
"If take a tangerine peel
bend it between my fingers and snap,
out break tiny droplets
which instill scent from my hand,
the orchards again of Swartfoloos (Note: Swart (Black) Umfolozi river, Black Umfolozi River)
and with tangerines around me
I know how to comfort a woman
My girlfriend is in a tangerine,
my grandmother in cinnamon,
there's someone...someone in aniseed,
there's a woman in every flavour!"

The poem forms an extended metaphor whereby the tiny droplets produced by the cracking of a peel is compared to memories. This comparison leans heavily into the idea of smells being able to bring a person to a moment in the past. The translation of the poem does not fully convey this point as effectively as in the original, Afrikaans.
