= Breyten Breytenbach =

South African writer and painter (1939–2024)

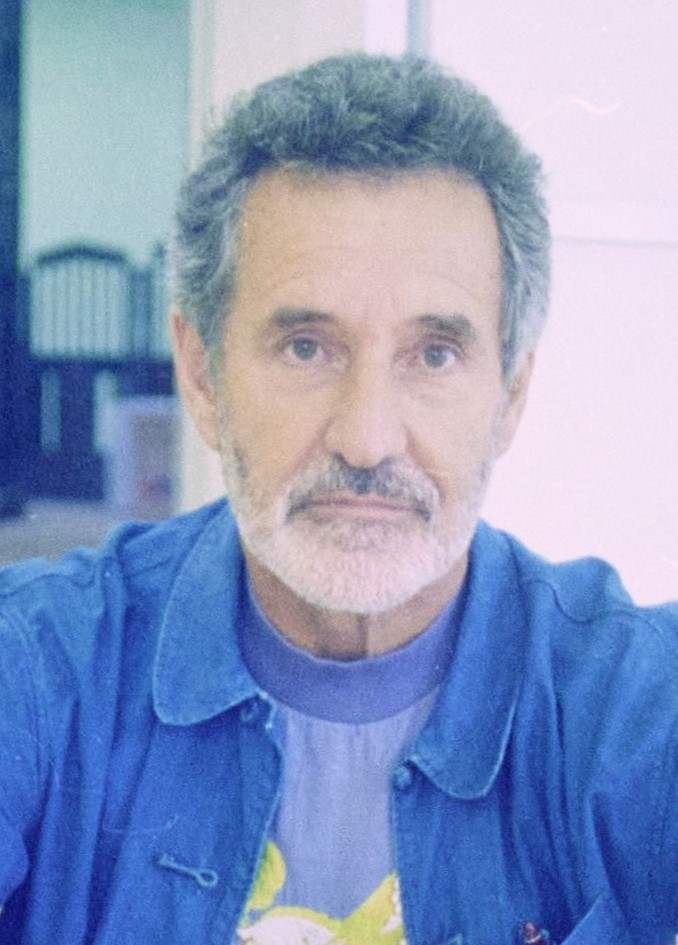
- Breytenbach in 1995
- Born: 16 September 1939; Bonnievale, Cape Province, Union of South Africa
- Died: 24 November 2024 (aged 85); Paris, France
- Citizenship: South Africa; France (since 1982)
- Education: University of Cape Town
- Occupations: Poet; painter; novelist; essayist
- Spouse: Yolande
- Relatives: Jan Breytenbach (brother); Cloete Breytenbach (brother)
- Writing career
- Language: Afrikaans, English
- Notable awards: Chevalier de la Legion d'Honneur; Commandeur des Arts et Lettres; Zbigniew Herbert International Literary Award
- Literary movement: Sestigers

Breyten Breytenbach (Afrikaans pronunciation: [ˈbrəitən ˈbrəitənbaχ]; 16 September 1939 – 24 November 2024) was a South African writer, poet, and painter. He became internationally well-known as a dissident poet and vocal critic of South Africa under apartheid, and as a political prisoner of the National Party–led South African Government. He was also known as a founding member of the Sestigers, a dissident literary movement, and was one of the most important poets in Afrikaans literature.

== Early life and education ==
Breyten Breytenbach was born on 16 September 1939 in Bonnievale, South Africa.

For secondary education, he attended Hoërskool Hugenote, in Wellington, Western Cape. He later attended the University of Cape Town, studying fine arts at the Michaelis School of Fine Art as well as philology.

== Activism and imprisonment ==
Breytenbach was a political dissenter against the ruling National Party and its white supremacist policy of apartheid in the early 1960s. He was a founding member of the Sestigers, a dissident literary movement of Afrikaner writers, in 1961, and participated in protests against the exclusion of black youth from educational pathways.

He left South Africa and lived in Europe and London for some time. In Paris, France, he married a French woman of Vietnamese ancestry, Yolande, as a result of which he was not allowed to return. The then applicable Prohibition of Mixed Marriages Act of 1949 and Immorality Act (1950) made it a criminal offence for a person to have any sexual relations with a person of a different race. However, in 1973, a special visa was granted to the couple to allow them to travel to South Africa for a writers' congress at the University of Cape Town.

Breytenbach was involved in the anti-apartheid movement throughout the late 1960s and early 1970s, and joined the international organisation Okhela (meaning "spark"). He spoke out against the policy of apartheid at writers' forums and United Nations conferences.

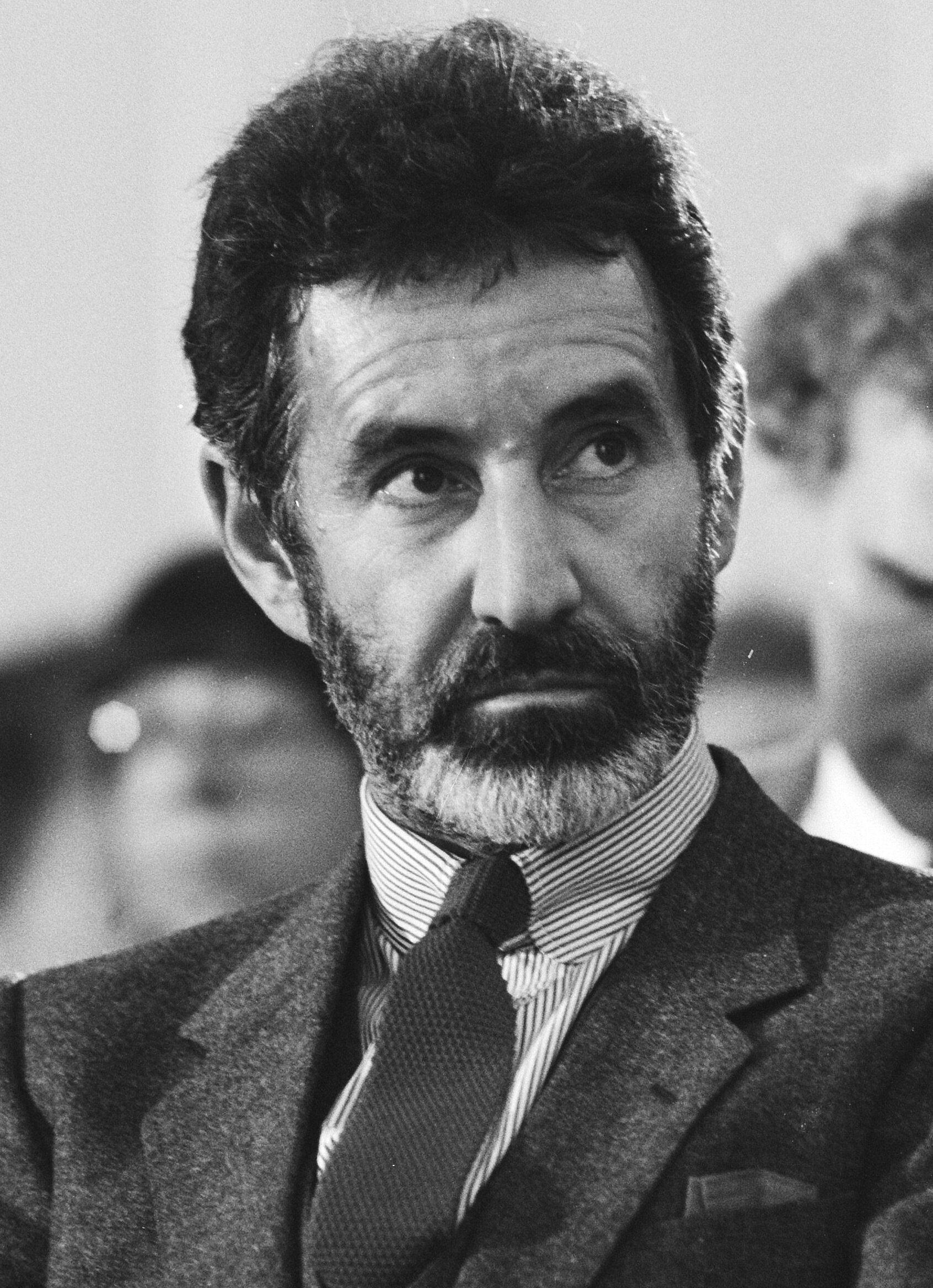
Breytenbach in 1983

After travelling to South Africa in 1975 on a false passport with the intention of helping black Africans organise trade unions, and to recruit members of Okhela, Breytenbach was arrested. At his trial at the Supreme Court in Pretoria after being charged under the Terrorism Act 1967, he pleaded guilty to entering South Africa to start a branch of Okhela, which was intended to be a branch of the African National Congress (ANC) for white people. He was sentenced to nine years' imprisonment for high treason, the first two in solitary confinement. According to André Brink, Breytenbach was retried in June 1977 on new and fanciful charges that, among other things, he had planned a submarine attack by the Soviet Navy on the Robben Island prison through the Okhela. In the end, the judge found Breytenbach guilty only of having smuggled letters and poems out of jail, for which he was fined $50. He was not physically assaulted, but the prison officials abused him verbally, taunted him by pointing out the censorship of letters from his mother, and allowed him no privacy to mourn her death. While in prison, he wrote Mouroir: Mirror Notes of a Novel (published after his release, in 1983). He revisited his prison experiences in The True Confessions of an Albino Terrorist (1984), in which neither the narrator nor his confessor are given stable identities.

He served seven years and was released in December 1982 as a result of international protests and the intervention of the French president François Mitterrand. Breytenbach returned to Paris, where he remained for the rest of his life, after obtaining French citizenship.

In December 1993, he visited the "new South Africa", and continued to travel there regularly, as well as spending time in the United States and Europe. He continued to be "a critical observer and commentator on South African political and social issues". He became a vocal critic of Nelson Mandela's government, and said that the ANC had turned into a "corrupt organisation".

After free elections toppled the ruling National Party and ended apartheid in 1994, Breytenbach became a visiting professor at the University of Cape Town in the Graduate School of Humanities in January 2000.

He was a founding member and served as executive director of the Gorée Institute in Dakar, Senegal. This arose from an historic meeting in 1987 that became known as the Dakar Conference, between exiled leaders of the ANC and a group of liberal South Africans, mostly Afrikaners, from all walks of life. This gathering, held to define a strategy for effective struggle against the apartheid regime, was one of many that opened the way for a negotiated end to apartheid in South Africa. A good friend of Breytenbach, Frederik van Zyl Slabbert, also attended. Breytenbach later taught classes at the institute.

He also campaigned against other injustices in the world. He wrote an open letter in The Guardian to Ariel Sharon, Prime Minister of Israel, in 2002, saying that Israel was committing crimes against the Palestinians, and "A viable state cannot be built on the expulsion of another people who have as much claim to that territory as you have".

== Writing ==
Breytenbach wrote poetry, novels, plays, and essays, mostly in Afrikaans. Many of his works have been translated into multiple languages.

His first published work was Die Ysterkoei Moet Sweet ("The Iron Cow Must Sweat") in 1964. It was regarded as groundbreaking in Afrikaans poetry, presenting "powerful and startling ideas ... without the use of traditional rhythmic metres and attractive images".

While in Paris, Breytenbach wrote several works about his experience as an immigrant. His work was at the time controversial in South Africa. His book Skryt. Om 'n sinkende skip blou te verf (Scrit. Painting Blue a Sinking Ship), published in the Netherlands in 1972, was dedicated "to the people of South Africa, denied citizenship in their own country". The book was banned from sale in South Africa.

During his imprisonment, Breytenbach wrote five volumes of poetry and English prose. His prison writings included the poem "Ballade van ontroue bemindes" ("Ballade of Unfaithful Lovers"). Inspired by François Villon's 15th-century "Ballade des Dames du Temps Jadis", Breytenbach compared Afrikaner dissidents Peter Blum, Ingrid Jonker, and himself to unfaithful lovers, who had betrayed Afrikaans poetry by taking leave of it.

In 1984, he published The True Confessions of an Albino Terrorist.

== Art ==
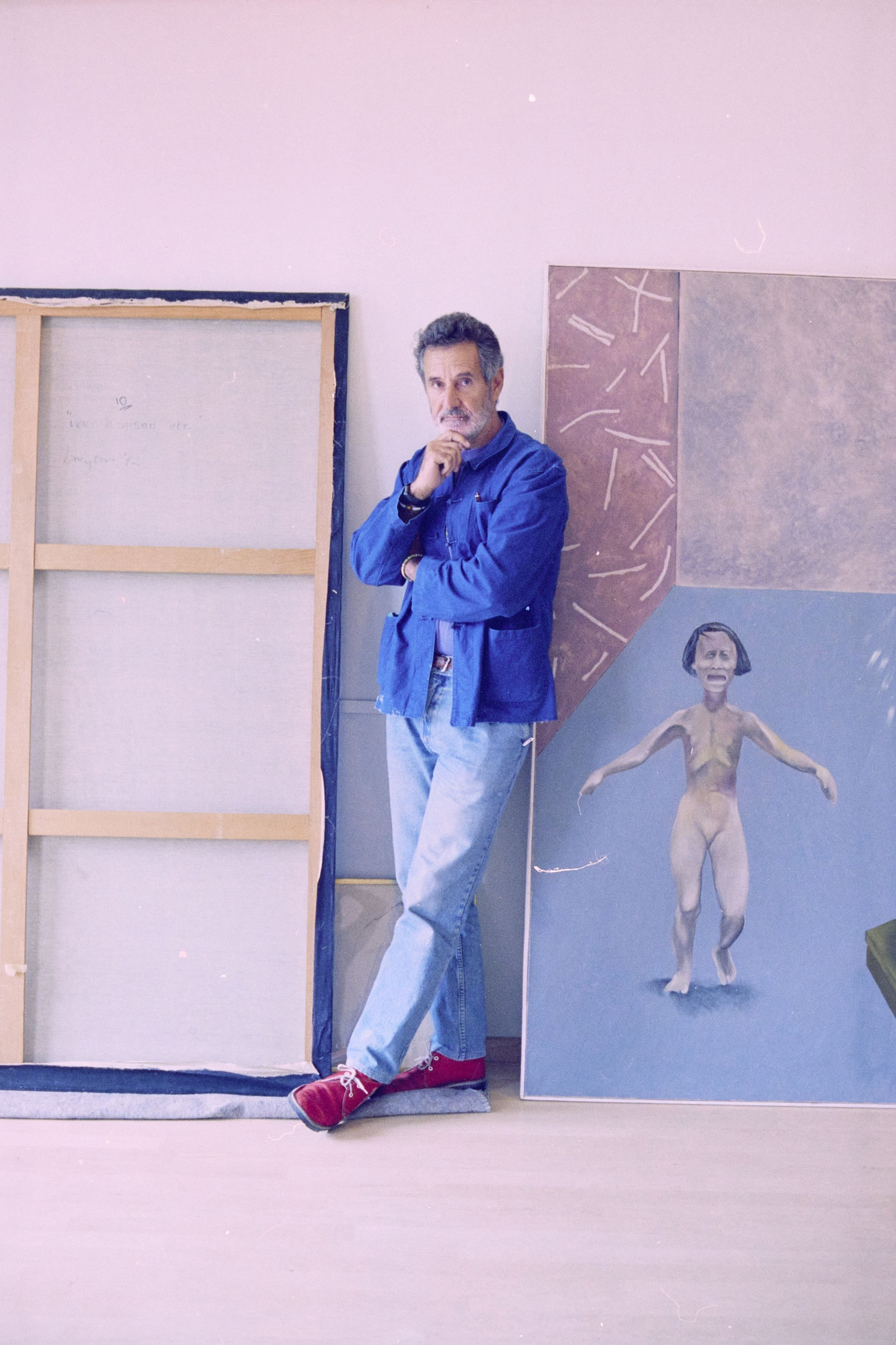
Breytenbach with art works, 1995

Breytenbach was also known for his paintings, which have been exhibited internationally in Amsterdam, Paris, New York City, Stockholm, and Hong Kong. The works are often surreal in nature, featuring animal and human figures in captivity. He was inspired by Francisco Goya and Hieronymus Bosch.

In October to November 2018, a solo exhibition of his recent work, along with some older works, entitled The 81 ways of letting go a late self, was held at the Stevenson Gallery in Cape Town.

== Academia ==
In January 2000, Breytenbach started a three-year stint as visiting professor in the departments of English and Drama in the Graduate School of Humanities at the University of Cape Town.

He also taught at the University of Natal, Princeton University, and in the Graduate Creative Writing Program at New York University. He was Global Distinguished Professor at NYU for over ten years.

== Other roles ==
In 2013, Breytenbach became the curator of the Poetry Festival in Stellenbosch, near Cape Town.

== Personal life, death, and legacy ==
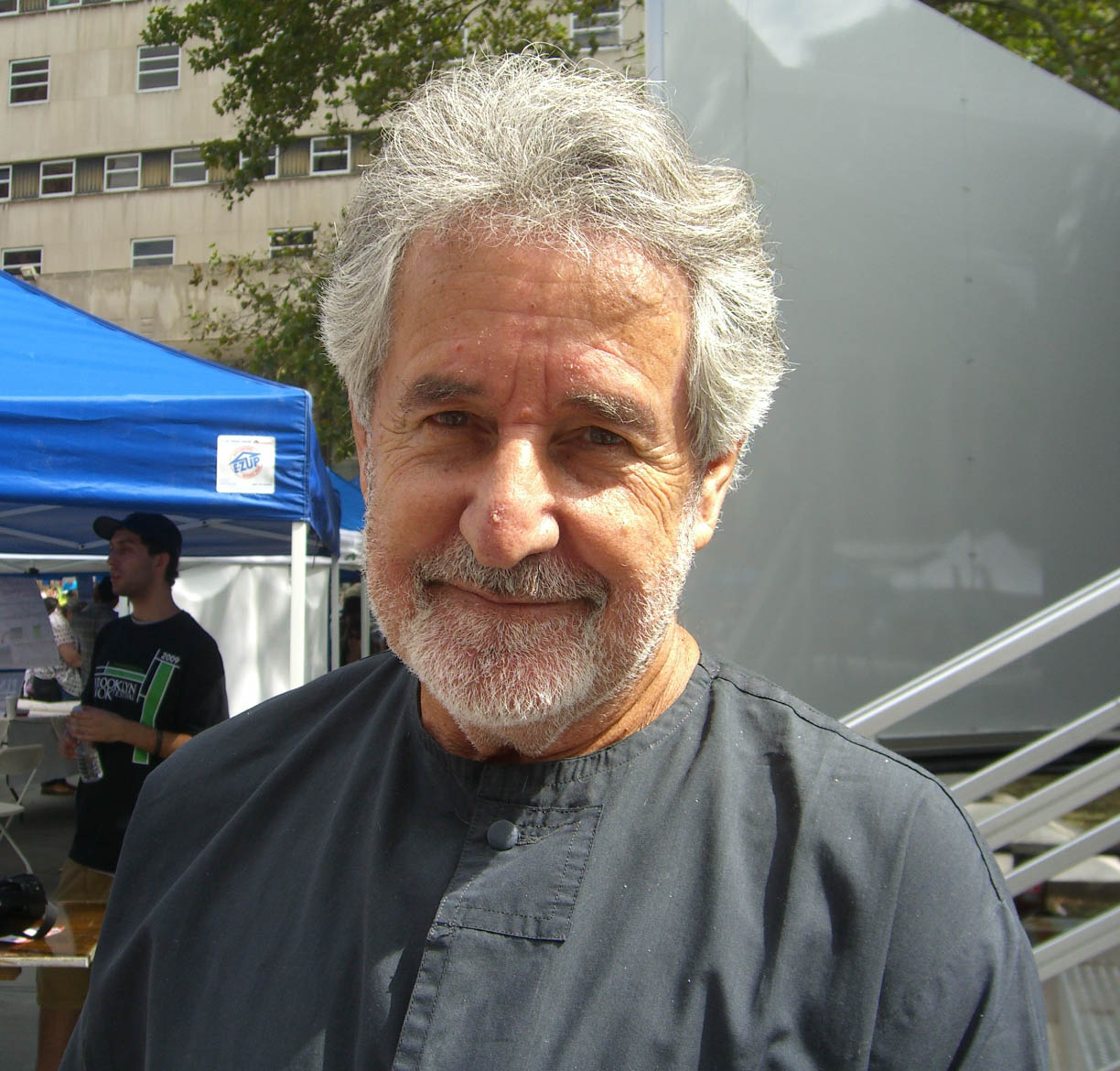
Breytenbach in 2009

In 1962, Breytenbach met and married the daughter of the South Vietnamese ambassador to France, Yolande Ngo Thi Hoang Lien. She was born in Vietnam and raised in France, and carried French citizenship. He had a daughter, Daphnée, and two grandsons. He also held French citizenship. He practised Zen Buddhism.

In an interview with The New York Times in May 1983, Breytenbach said: "I'd never reject Afrikaans as a language, but I reject it as part of the Afrikaner political identity. I no longer consider myself an Afrikaner".

Breytenbach died after a fall in Paris, France, on 24 November 2024, at the age of 85. His wife Yolande was by his side.

He was the younger brother of Jan Breytenbach (1932–2024), an SADF commander with political views strongly opposed to his, and Cloete Breytenbach (1933–2019), a widely published war correspondent. Cloete was notably one of the few people given permission by South African Prime Minister John Vorster to take photographs of Nelson Mandela at Robben Island following his imprisonment there in July 1964.

Breytenbach was informally considered by Afrikaans-speakers as their poet laureate and was one of the most important living poets in Afrikaans literature.

One of the jurors for the 2017 Zbigniew Herbert International Literary Award, German writer, publisher, and translator Michael Krüger, wrote: "Breytenbach is without question the most gifted and most productive poet of White-Africa's literature ... His works as a poet and as a painter are now acknowledged as outstanding in understanding our modern world".

== Honours and awards ==
=== French honours ===
- Chevalier de la Légion d'Honneur
- Commandeur des Arts et Lettres (France's top cultural award)

=== Literary awards ===
- CNA Award (5 times), for Die huis van die dowe (1968), Kouevuur (1969), Lotus (1970), YK (1983), and Memory of snow and dust (1989)
- 1965: APB Prize for Die ysterkoei moet sweet and Katastrofes
- 1968: Reina Prinsen Geerligs Award for South Africa, for Die huis van die dowe
- 1972: Lucy B. and C.W. van der Hoogt Prize, for Lotus
- 1984, 1999, 2008, & 2010: Hertzog Prize He refused to accept the 1984 prize (for Yk).
- 1982: Van der Hoogt Prize for Skryt
- 1985: Anisfield-Wolf Book Award for Fiction, for Mouroir: Mirrornotes of a Novel
- 1986: Rapport Literature Prize, worth R 15,000 (a major prize)
- 1994: Alan Paton Award, for Return to Paradise
- 2007: W.A. Hofmeyr Prize, for "Die windvanger"
- 2008: Hertzog Prize, for "Die windvanger"
- 2008: University of Johannesburg Prize for Creative Writing, for "Die windvanger"
- 2010: Mahmoud Darwish Award for Creativity, for Outre Voix/Voice Over, the French translation of Oorblyfsel/Voice Over: 'n roudig
- 2010: Max Jacob Prize, for Outre Voix/Voice Over
- 2010: Protea Poetry Prize
- 2017: Zbigniew Herbert International Literary Award
- Jan Campert Prize, special prize
- Jacobus van Looy Prize (for literature and art)
- Perskor Prize, for Voetskrif
- International Publishers Prize, special prize

== In popular culture ==
Breytenbach is mentioned by name as the only exception in the satirical apartheid-era Spitting Image song "I've Never Met a Nice South African".

The Basque rock band Berri Txarrak dedicated the song "Breyten" to him on their 2005 album Jaio.Musika.Hil.

== Works ==
Breytenbach's work includes numerous volumes of novels, poetry and essays, many of which are in Afrikaans. Many have been translated from Afrikaans to English, and many were originally published in English. Exhibitions of his paintings and prints have been shown in cities around the world.

His works have been translated into many languages, including English, Dutch, German, French, Arabic, Polish, Danish, Basque, Swedish, Portuguese, Spanish, and Italian.

=== Poetry in Afrikaans ===
- Die ysterkoei moet sweet (The Iron Cow Must Sweat), Johannesburg, 1964
- Die huis van die dowe (The House of the Deaf), Cape Town, 1967
- Kouevuur (Gangrene), Cape Town, 1969
- Lotus, Cape Town, 1970
- The Remains (Oorblyfsels), Cape Town, 1970
- Skryt. Om 'n sinkende skip blou te verf (Scrit. Painting Blue a sinking Ship), Amsterdam, 1972
- Met ander woorde (In Other Words), Cape Town, 1973
- Voetskrif (Footnote), Johannesburg, 1976
- Sinking Ship Blues, Oasis Editions, Toronto 1977
- And Death White as Words. An Anthology, London, 1978
- In Africa even the flies are happy, London, 1978
- Flower Writing (Blomskryf), Emmarentia, 1979 (Selected poems)
- Eclipse (Eklips), Emmarentia, 1983
- YK, Emmarentia, 1983
- Buffalo Bill, Emmarentia, 1984
- Living Death (Lewendood), Emmarentia, 1985
- Judas Eye, London – New York, 1988
- As Like (Soos die so), Emmarentia, 1990
- Nine Landscapes of our Times Bequeathed to a Beloved (Nege landskappe van ons tye bemaak aan 'n beminde), Groenkloof, 1993
- The Handful of Feathers (Die hand vol vere), Cape Town, 1995 (Selected poems)
- The Remains. An Elegy (Oorblyfsels. 'n Roudig), Cape Town, 1997
- Paper Flower (Papierblom), Cape Town, 1998
- Lady One, Cape Town, 2000 (Selected love poems)
- Iron Cow Blues (Ysterkoei-blues), Cape Town, 2001 (Collected poems 1964–1975)
- Lady One: Of Love and other Poems, New York, 2002
- The undanced dance. Prison poetry 1975 – 1983 (Die ongedanste dans. Gevangenisgedigte 1975 – 1983), Cape Town, 2005
- Die windvanger (The windcatcher), Cape Town, 2007
- Voice Over: A Nomadic Conversation with Mahmoud Darwish, Archipelago Books, 2009
- Catalects (Artefacts for the slow uses of dying) (Katalekte (artefakte vir die stadige gebruike van doodgaan)), Cape Town: Human & Rousseau, 2012

=== Prose in English ===
- Catastrophes (Katastrofes), Johannesburg, 1964 (stories)
- To Fly (Om te vlieg), Cape Town, 1971 (novel)
- The Tree Behind the Moon (De boom achter de maan), Amsterdam, 1974 (stories)
- The Anthill Bloats … (Die miernes swell op ...), Emmarentia, 1980 (stories)
- A Season in Paradise (Een seizoen in het paradijs), Amsterdam – New York – London, 1980 (novel, uncensored edition)
- Mouroir: Mirror Notes of a Novel, London – New York, 1983
- Mirror Death (Spiegeldood), Amsterdam, 1984 (stories)
- End Papers, London, 1985 (essays)
- The True Confessions of an Albino Terrorist, London – New York, 1985
- Memory of Snow and of Dust, London – New York, 1987 (novel)
- Book. Part One (Boek. Deel een), Emmarentia, 1987 (essays)
- All One Horse. Fiction and Images, London, 1989
- Sweet Heart (Hart-Lam), Emmarentia, 1991 (essays)
- Return to Paradise. An African journal, London – New York, 1992 (which won the Alan Paton Award)
- The Memory of Birds in Times of Revolution, London – New York, 1996 (essays)
- Dog Heart. A travel memoir, Cape Town, 1998
- Word Work (Woordwerk), Cape Town, 1999
- A Veil of Footsteps, Cape Town, 2008
- Intimate Stranger, Archipelago Books, 2009
- Notes From The Middle World: Essays, Haymarket Books, 2009

=== CDs ===
- Mondmusiek (2001)
- Lady One (2002)

=== Articles ===
- "Mandela's Smile: Notes on South Africa's Failed Revolution". Harper's Magazine. Vol. 317, no. 1903. December 2008. pp. 39–48.

== See also ==
- Sestigers
