= Hertzog Prize =

South-African award for literature, specifically in the Afrikaans language

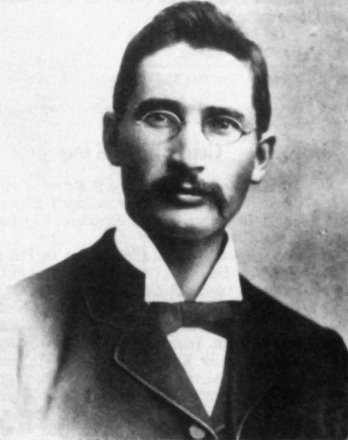
James Barry Munnik Hertzog.

The Hertzog Prize (or Hertzogprys) is an annual award given to Afrikaans writers by the Suid-Afrikaanse Akademie vir Wetenskap en Kuns (South African Academy for the Sciences and Art), formerly the South African Academy for Language, Literature and Arts (Zuid-Afrikaanse Akademie voor Wetenschap, Letteren en Kunst). It is the most prestigious prize in Afrikaans literature.

The prize was first established in 1914 as part of the Tweede Taalbeweging ("Second Language Movement"); its first winner was Totius for his 1915 poetry collection Trekkerswee (Trekkers' Grief). The prize is awarded in the categories of poetry, prose, and drama, and was previously awarded in the category of scientific writing.

== List of Hertzog Prize winners ==
=== Poetry ===
- 1916 – Totius (Trekkerswee)
- 1926 – A.G. Visser (Gedigte)
- 1928 – A.G. Visser (Rose van herinnering); C.M. van den Heever (Die nuwe boord)
- 1934 – Totius (Passieblomme); C. Louis Leipoldt (Skoonheidstroos); W.E.G. Louw (Die ryke dwaas)
- 1937 – I.D. du Plessis (Vreemde liefde and Ballades); N.P. van Wyk Louw (Alleenspraak)
- 1940 – N.P. van Wyk Louw (Die halwe kring)
- 1943 – Elisabeth Eybers (Die stil avontuur and Belydenis in die skemering)
- 1947 – D.J. Opperman (Heilige beeste)
- 1951 – Toon van den Heever (Gedigte 1919, omgewerk tot Eugène en ander gedigte 1931)
- 1962 – Ernst van Heerden (Die klop)
- 1965 – N.P. van Wyk Louw (Tristia)
- 1968 – Boerneef (postuum) (al sy digbundels)
- 1971 – Elisabeth Eybers (Onderdak)
- 1974 – Uys Krige (Uys Krige: 'n keur uit sy gedigte)
- 1977 – Wilma Stockenström (Van vergetelheid en van glans)
- 1980 – D.J. Opperman (Komas uit 'n bamboesstok)
- 1983 – Sheila Cussons (al haar digbundels)
- 1984 – Breyten Breytenbach (Yk)
- 1987 – T.T. Cloete (Idiolek en Allotroop – his other works, Jukstaposisie and Angelliera were also honoured)
- 1990 – Antjie Krog (Lady Anne)
- 1993 – T.T. Cloete (Met die aarde praat)
- 1996 – Ina Rousseau ( 'n Onbekende jaartal)
- 1999 – Breyten Breytenbach (Oorblyfsels: 'n Roudig and Papierblom)
- 2002 – Henning Pieterse (Die burg van hertog Bloubaard)
- 2005 – Petra Müller (poet) (Die aandag van jou oë)
- 2008 – Breyten Breytenbach (Die Windvanger)
- 2011 – Johann de Lange (Die algebra van nood)
- 2014 – Marlene van Niekerk (Kaar)
- 2017 – Antjie Krog (Mede-wete)
- 2020 – Johan Myburg (Uittogboek)
- 2023 – Antjie Krog (Plunder)
- 2026 – Tom Dreyer (Nou in infrarooi)

=== Drama ===
- 1926 – J.F.W. Grosskopf (As die tuig skawe and Drie eenbedrywe)
- 1935 – Henry Allan Fagan (Die ouderling en ander toneelstukke)
- 1944 – C. Louis Leipoldt (Die heks and Die laaste aand)
- 1952 – Gerhard Beukes (Langs die steiltes, Salome dans, As ons twee eers getroud is and agt eenbedrywe); W.A. de Klerk (Die jaar van die vuur-os, Drie vroue, Drie dramas and Vlamme oor La Roche)
- 1956 – D.J. Opperman (Periandros van Korinthe)
- 1960 – N.P. van Wyk Louw (Germanicus)
- 1969 – D.J. Opperman (Voëlvry)
- 1972 – P.G. du Plessis (Siener in die suburbs and Die nag van Legio)
- 1978 – Bartho Smit (Putsonderwater, Moeder Hanna, Christine and Die verminktes)
- 1981 – Henriette Grové (Ontmoeting by Dwaaldrif and all of her other dramatic work)
- 1985 – Uys Krige (entire oeuvre)
- 1991 – Chris Barnard (entire oeuvre)
- 1994 – Reza de Wet (Vrystaat-trilogie and Trits: Mis, Mirakel, Drif)
- 1997 – Reza de Wet (Drie susters twee)
- 2000 – André Brink (Die Jogger)
- 2003 – Pieter Fourie (complete drama oeuvre)
- 2006 – Deon Opperman (for his drama oeuvre up until 2005)
- 2009 – Deon Opperman (Kaburu)
- 2012 – Adam Small (for his drama oeuvre up until 1983)
- 2015 – Tertius Kapp (Rooiland and Oorsee)
- 2018 – Pieter-Dirk Uys
- 2021 – Nicola Hanekom
- 2024 – Nicola Hanekom (Mirre en Aalwyn)

=== Prose ===
- 1917 – Jochem van Bruggen (Teleurgestel)
- 1920 – Leon Maré (Ou Malkop)
- 1925 – Jochem van Bruggen (Ampie: die natuurkind)
- 1926 – D.F. Malherbe (Die meulenaar)
- 1927 – Jochem van Bruggen (Ampie: die meisiekind); C.J. Langenhoven (Skaduwees van Nasaret); Sangiro (Diamantkoors and Twee fortuinsoekers).
- 1930 – D.F. Malherbe (Hans-die-Skipper); G.C. and S.B. Hobson (Kees van die Kalahari)
- 1933 – Jochem van Bruggen (Die sprinkaanbeampte van Sluis)
- 1936 – Mikro (Toiings and Pelgrims)
- 1939 – D.F. Malherbe (Saul die worstelheld and Die profeet)
- 1942 – C.M. van den Heever (Laat vrugte)
- 1945 – Sangiro (entire oeuvre)
- 1953 – M.E.R. (entire oeuvre)
- 1957 – Elise Muller (Die vrou op die skuit)
- 1958 – N.P. van Wyk Louw (for critical prose and essays: Die mens agter die boek, Maskers van die erns, Lojale verset and Berigte te velde)
- 1961 – F.A. Venter (Swart pelgrim and Geknelde land)
- 1964 – Etienne Leroux (Sewe dae by die Silbersteins)
- 1970 – Karel Schoeman (By fakkellig, 'n Lug vol helder wolke and Spiraal)
- 1973 – Chris Barnard (Mahala and Duiwel-in-die-bos)
- 1976 – Anna M. Louw (Kroniek van Perdepoort)
- 1979 – Etienne Leroux (Magersfontein, O Magersfontein!)
- 1982 – Hennie Aucamp (entire oeuvre)
- 1984 – Henriette Grové (Die kêrel van die Pêrel)
- 1986 – Karel Schoeman ( 'n Ander land)
- 1989 – Etienne van Heerden (Toorberg)
- 1992 – Wilma Stockenström (Abjater wat so lag).
- 1995 – Karel Schoeman (Hierdie lewe)
- 1998 – Elsa Joubert (Die reise van Isobelle)
- 2001 – André Brink (Donkermaan)
- 2004 – Ingrid Winterbach (Niggie)
- 2007 – Marlene van Niekerk (Agaat)
- 2010 – Etienne van Heerden (30 Nagte in Amsterdam)
- 2013 – Ingrid Winterbach (Die aanspraak van lewende wesens)
- 2016 – Willem Anker (Buys)
- 2019 – Fanie Naudé (Die derde spoel)
- 2022 – Fanie Naudé (Dol heuning)
- 2025 – Eben Venter (Decima)

=== Scientific prose ===
- 1943 – J. du P. Scholtz (Die Afrikaner en sy taal).
- 1944 – C. Beyers (Die Kaapse Patriotte).
