= Elisabeth Eybers =

South African poet (1915–2007)

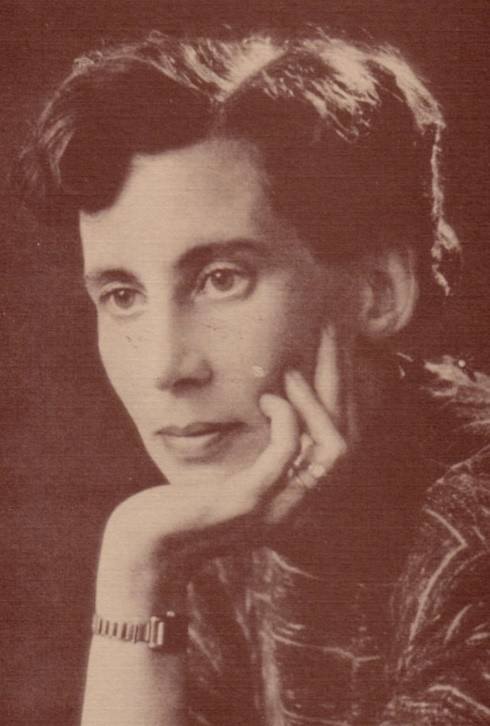
Elisabeth Eybers

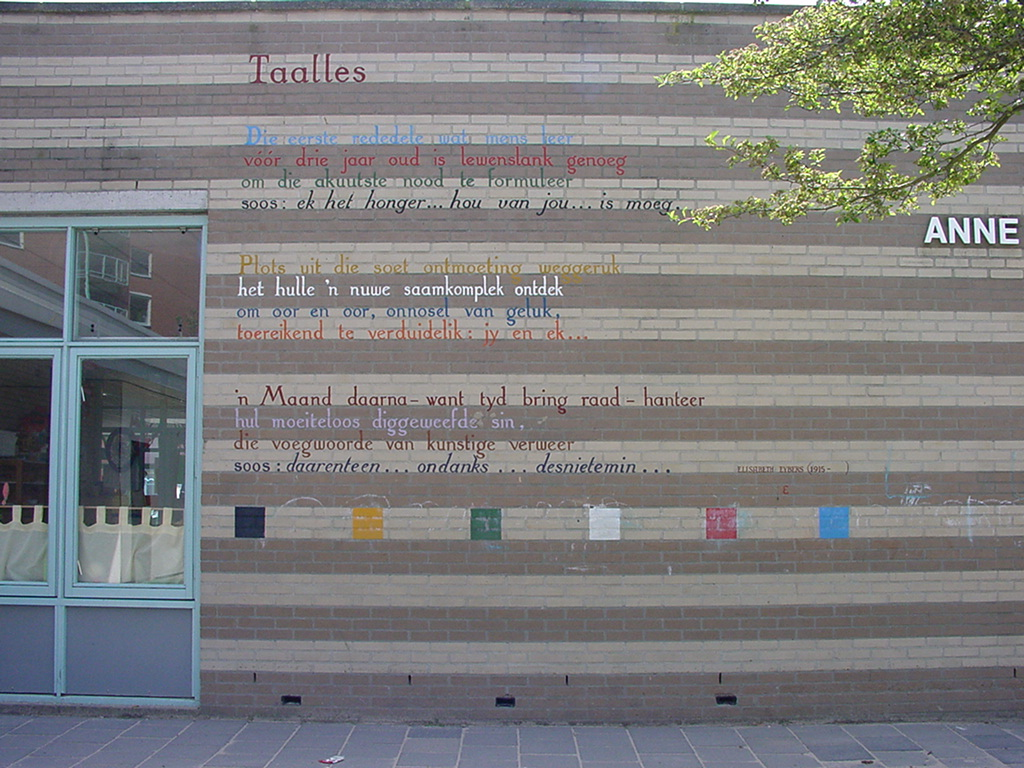
Taalles by Elisabeth Eybers as a wall poem in Leiden

Elisabeth Françoise Eybers (26 February 1915 – 1 December 2007) was a South African poet. Her poetry was mainly in Afrikaans, although she translated some of her own work (and those of others) into English.

Eybers was born in Klerksdorp, Transvaal. She grew up in the town of Schweizer-Reneke, where her father was the local dominee of the Dutch Reformed Church in South Africa church. After completing her high school studies there at the age of 16, she enrolled at the University of the Witwatersrand for a Bachelor of Arts degree, which she achieved cum laude.

After her graduation she became a journalist. In 1937 Eybers married the businessman Albert Wessels, with whom she had three daughters and a son. Counted among the so-called Dertigers, she became the first Afrikaans woman to win the Hertzog Prize for poetry in 1943. She won the prize again in 1971.

Her work received many other awards in both South Africa and the Netherlands, including the Constantijn Huygens Prize in 1978 and the P. C. Hooft Award in 1991.

Eybers' first collection of poems, Belydenis in die Skemering ("Confession at twilight"), was published in 1936. Her second collection, Die Stil Avontuur ("The silent adventure"), was published in 1939 and was mainly about being a mother.

Die Vrou en ander verse (The woman and other poems) was published in 1945, while her fourth poetry collection, Die Ander Dors (The other thirst), was published in 1946.

Many other poetry collections followed regularly, including:

- Tussensang (In-between song), 1950 ISBN 0624009599, 978-0624009597
- Helder Halfjaar (Bright half-year), 1956
- Versamelde Gedigte (Collected poems), 1957
- Neerslag (Precipitation), 1958
- Balans (Balance), 1962
- Onderdak (Under shelter), 1965
- Kruis of Munt (Head or tail), 1973

Later works include the bilingual Verbruikersverse/Consumer's verse (1997) en Winter-surplus (1999).

Translations of her poems have also been published in German, French, Italian and Hebrew.

Among the settings of her poetry by South African composers are "Die Vreemde Dae" by Cromwell Everson and two song cycles by Hendrik Hofmeyr, "Drie gedigte van Elisabeth Eybers" (1984) and "Die stil avontuur" (2003) http://www.composers21.com/compdocs/hofmeyrh.htm Dutch composer Bertha Tideman-Wijers used Eybers' text for her composition Three Songs on a South African text. Dutch composer Marjo Tal also set several of Eybers’ poems to music.

After her divorce in 1961, she met Pieter Hennipman. They were married from 1974 until his death in 1994. She lived in Amsterdam, Netherlands, and she was buried at Zorgvlied cemetery.
