= Jan Rabie =

South African writer (1920–2001)

- Born: 14 November 1920; George, Western Cape, South Africa
- Died: 15 November 2001 (aged 81); Onrus
- Occupation: Novelist

Jan Sebastiaan Rabie (14 November 1920 - 15 November 2001) was an Afrikaans writer of short stories, novels and other literary works. He was born in George, and was the writer of twenty-one works. He was included under the Sestigers, a group of influential Afrikaans writers of the 1960s.

== Novels ==
Note: The English titles are translated from the Afrikaans, and are not available as such.

- Nog skyn die sterre (Still the stars are shining) (1943)
- Geen somer (No summer) (1944)
- Vertrou op môre (Believe in tomorrow) (1946)
- Die pad na mekaar (The road to one another) (1947)
- Dakkamer en agterplaas (Attic and backyard) (1957)
- Swart ster oor die Karoo (Black star over the Karoo) (1957)
- Ons, die afgod (Us, the idol) (1958)
- Die groen planeet (The green planet) (1961)
- Mens-alleen (Man alone) (1963)
- Die groot anders-maak (The great changing) (1964)
- Eiland voor Afrika (Island before Africa) (1964)
- Waar jy sterwe (Where you die) (1966)
- Klipwieg (Stone crib) (1970)
- Die hemelblom (The heavenly flower) (1971)
- Ark (Ark) (1977)
- Johanna se storie (Johanna's story) (1981)
- En oseaan (And Ocean) (1985)

== Short stories ==
- Een-en-twintig (Twenty-one) (1956)
- Die roos aan die pels (The rose on the fur) (1966)
- Versamelverhale (Collected novels) (1980)

== Non-fiction ==
- Groen reise (Green travels) (1950)
- Die evolusie van nasionalisme (The evolution of nationalism) (1960)
- Polemika, (Polemic) 1957-1965 (1966)
- ’n Haan vir Eloúnda (A rooster for Eloúnda) (1971)
- ’n Boek vir Onrus (A book for Onrus) (1982)
- Buidel (Pouch) (1989)
- Paryse dagboek (Paris diary) (1998)

== Young adult novels ==
- Twee strandlopers (Two beachwalkers) (1960)
- Seeboek van die sonderkossers (Sea book for those without food) (1975)
