= N. P. van Wyk Louw =

South African poet (1906–1970)

Nicolaas Petrus van Wyk Louw
- Born: 11 June 1906; Sutherland, Cape Colony
- Died: 18 June 1970 (aged 64); Johannesburg, Transvaal, Republic of South Africa
- Education: Master's Degree in German at the University of Cape Town, Honorary Degree from the University of Utrecht.
- Occupations: Afrikaans poet, playwright, and scholar
- Relatives: W.E.G. Louw
- Writing career
- Notable works: Alleenspraak; Die halwe kring Raka; Germanicus

Nicolaas Petrus van Wyk Louw (11 June 1906 in Sutherland, Cape Colony – 18 June 1970 in Johannesburg), almost universally known as N.P. van Wyk Louw, was an Afrikaans-language poet, playwright and scholar. He was the older brother of Afrikaans-language poet W.E.G. Louw.

One of the Dertigers, or "Writers of the Thirties," N.P. van Wyk Louw produced among his most famous works his debut 1935 volume of poems, Alleenspraak ("Monologue"), the 1937 poetry collection Die halwe kring ("The Semicircle"), the verse epic Raka, and the 1956 tragedy Germanicus.

N.P. van Wyk Louw is quoted on the Afrikaans Language Monument in Paarl, Western Cape Province; in his quote, he views Afrikaans as a bridge that connects Europe with Africa.

The South African composer Cromwell Everson composed a song cycle, "Vier Liefdesliedjies" ("Four little love songs") that used three of Louw's poems: "Nagliedje", "Net altyd jy" and "Dennebosse" (respectively, "Little night song", "Only always you" and "Pine forest").

A collection of the correspondence between N.P. van Wyk and his brother W.E.G. Louw was published by Hemel & See Boeke in 2011 under the title "Briewe van W.E.G. en N.P. van Wyk Louw 1941-1970".

== Life ==
The second of four brothers, N.P. van Wyk Louw moved to Cape Town at the age of 14. He earned a master's degree in German at the University of Cape Town, where he later taught. He received an honorary degree from the University of Utrecht in 1948 and was a professor of Afrikaans at the University of Amsterdam from 1949 to 1958. He finished his academic career at the University of Witwatersrand as head of the Dutch/Afrikaans department.

== Criticism ==
D.J. Opperman (Senior Verseboek, Nationale Pers 1962), one of the notable Afrikaner poets of the first half of the twentieth century, was in no doubt that van Wyk Louw was the greatest Afrikaner poet of the period.
