= Lemay =

Lemay is a surname, and may refer to:

- Anick Lemay, Canadian comedian and actress
- Annie Lemay (born 1977), Canadian curler
- Armand Lemay (1873–1963), French architect
- Chris Lemay, American soccer coach and business owner
- Dominique Lemay (born 1950), French humanitarian
- Elizabeth Lemay (born 1990), Canadian author and columnist
- Elyse Lemay-Lavoie (born 1994), Canadian water polo player
- Erika Lemay (born 1983), Canadian artist, aerial dancer and actress
- Eugene Lemay (born 1960), American artist and fraudster
- Fernand Lemay (1894–1980), French cyclist
- Guillaume Lemay-Thivierge (born 1976), Canadian actor and film producer
- Harding Lemay (1922–2018), American screenwriter
- Henri Lemay (1939–2021), Canadian politician
- Hugo Lemay (born 1983), Canadian snowboarder
- Jacqueline Lemay (1937–2026), Canadian singer-songwriter and guitarist
- Joseph Lemay (1829–1892), Canadian politician
- Laura Lemay (born 1967), American technical writer
- Leo Lemay (1935–2008), American philosopher
- Leo Lemay (bishop) (1909–1983), American Catholic prelate
- Lucille Lemay (born 1950), Canadian archer
- Lynda Lemay (born 1966), Canadian singer-songwriter
- Marc Lemay (born 1951), Canadian politician from Quebec
- Martin Lemay (born 1964), Canadian politician
- Mathieu Lemay (born 1979), Canadian politician from Quebec
- Moe Lemay (1962–2024), Canadian ice hockey player
- Napoleon Lemay (1865–1946), Canadian politician from Quebec
- Philippe Lemay (born 1977), Canadian curler
- Robert Lemay (born 1960), Canadian composer
- Théophile Lemay (1784–1848), Canadian farmer and politician

== See also ==
- Lemay, Missouri, United States
- LeMay
- Le May
