= LeMay =

LeMay is a surname, and may refer to:

- Brian LeMay (born 1983), American rugby union footballer
- Curtis LeMay (1906–1990), American air force general
- Dick LeMay (1938–2018), American baseball player
- Harold LeMay (1919–2000), American businessman and automobile collector
- John D. LeMay (born 1962), American actor and filmmaker
- Lynn LeMay (born 1961), American pornographic actress
- Nancy LeMay (born 1936), American car enthusiast and collector

== See also ==
- LeMay - America's Car Museum
- Lemay
- Le May
