= Pacific Northwest Museum of Motorcycling =

Coordinates: 47.7027858°N 122.3567554°W

- Established: 1994
- Location: Seattle, Washington
- Type: Virtual transport museum
- Collection size: 6,000 photographs
- President: Tammy Sessions
- Curator: Tom Samuelsen
- Website: pnwmm.org

The Pacific Northwest Museum of Motorcycling, founded in 1994, is a virtual motorcycle museum headquartered in Seattle, Washington. In the mid-1990s it had a physical location at Rainier Square in Seattle. The museum preserves history of motorcycling in the Pacific Northwest, and has sponsored motorcycle exhibits such as the 2014 Marymount Museum show hosted by LeMay Family Collection Foundation. The museum holds over 6,000 photographs documenting motorcycling in the Pacific Northwest.

The museum is a member of Association of King County Historical Organizations.
