= Le May =

Le May is a surname, and may refer to

- Alan Le May (1899–1964), American novelist
- Godfrey Le May (1920–2012), South African historian and academic
- Olivier Le May (1734–1797), French painter

== See also ==
- Lemay
- LeMay
