= LeMay Car Show =

Annual vintage car show in Washington, United States

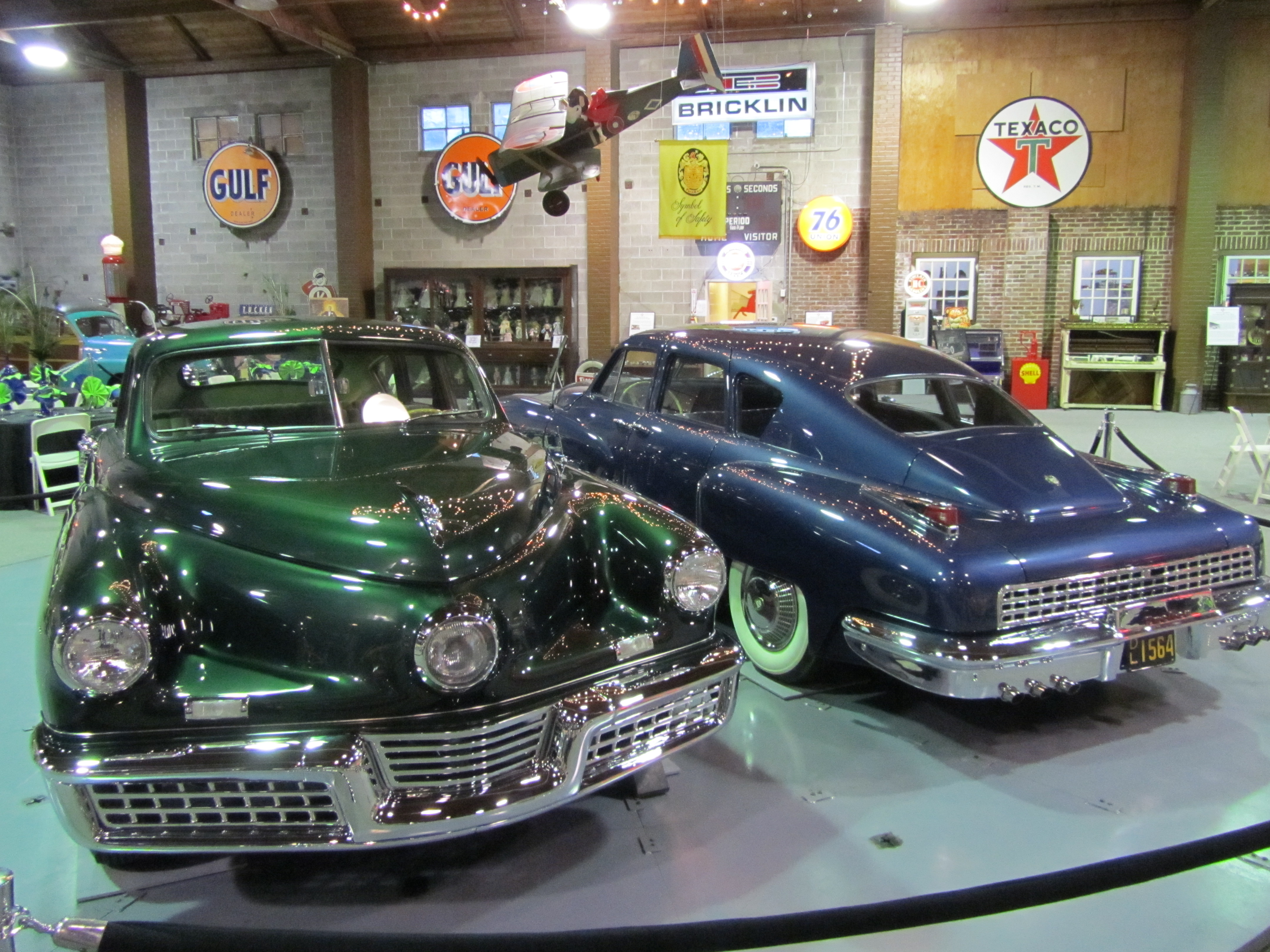
Two Tucker 48s at the 35th LeMay Car Show

The Annual LeMay Car Show began in 1978, as a small gathering with Harold and Nancy LeMay and friends. The tradition continues to this day, with over 1,000 vintage cars shown on the last Saturday of August each year, and collectors coming to see them. The yearly event is held at the LeMay Family Collection Foundation at Marymount in Tacoma, Washington, and the LeMays open up their home. This event is not just about celebrating cars, though. The staff and volunteers view this car show as a way of connecting people with history. The past few years, an auction has also been part of the car show.

== Feature Cars ==
Each year, the LeMay Car Show has had a car featured as the centerpiece of the show.

Show #	Year	Featured Car(s)
1	1978	N/A
2	1979	N/A
3	1980	1933 Packard Eight
4	1981	1929 Windsor Model 8-82
5	1982	1941 Cadillac Series 62
6	1983	1937 Chevrolet
7	1984	1938 Chevrolet Master
8	1985	1931 Cadillac Series 355 Phaeton
9	1986	1934 Ford Deluxe Roadster 1935 Ford Deluxe Phaeton 1936 Ford Convertible 1938 Ford Deluxe 2-Door Convertible 1939 Ford Deluxe 4-Door Sedan
10	1987	1936 Auburn Supercharged
11	1988	1928 Chevrolet Cabriolet
12	1989	1919 Cadillac Phaeton
13	1990	1958 Chevrolet Impala
14	1991	1940 Cadillac V16 Convertible
15	1992	1949 Kaiser Deluxe 4-Door Convertible
16	1993	1946 Chevrolet 2 Ton Wrecker
17	1994	1920 Stutz Fire Truck
18	1995	1940 Pontiac 1939 Buick Century 1939 Australian Chevrolet Ute
19	1996	1926 Rolls-Royce
20	1997	1912 White Dump Truck 1913 Oakland 1920 Pierce-Arrow 1922 Austro-Daimler 1947 Chevrolet 1/2 ton pickup truck 1949 Buick Super 1954 Packard 1954 Sunbeam Alpine 1956 Chevrolet Bel Air Convertible 1959 Ford Thunderbird 1960 Chrysler 300F 1969 Chevrolet Corvette 1962 Pontiac Catalina 2+2 1967 Ford Shelby Mustang GT 500 1968 Dodge Charger 1969 Chevrolet Caprice 1970 Dodge Charger 1982 Rolls-Royce Corniche 1916 Buick Abadal 1957 Ford garbage truck
21	1998	1954 Wolseley Police Car 1946 Chevrolet Farm Express Pickup
22	1999	1913 Daimler
23	2000	1938 Horch
24	2001	1936 Case tractor 1929 Acme Dump Truck
25	2002	1960 Chevrolet El Camino
26	2003	1942 Chrysler Windsor Highlander
27	2004	1923 Autocar Station Bus
28	2005	1956 GMC 250 Wrecker
29	2006	1954 Kaiser Darrin KF-161 Roadster
30	2007	1940 Chevrolet COE Paddy Wagon
31	2008	1956 Nash Statesman Super
32	2009	1937 Chrysler C17 Airflow
33	2010	1956 Powell Station Wagon 1956 Powell Pickup Truck
34	2011	1958 Oldsmobile Dynamic 88
35	2012	1948 Tucker
36	2013	1961 Civil Defense Shelter
37	2014	1940 Mercury Eight 4-Door Convertible
40	2017	1956 Mercury Monterey Phaeton
