= Etienne Leroux =

South African writer

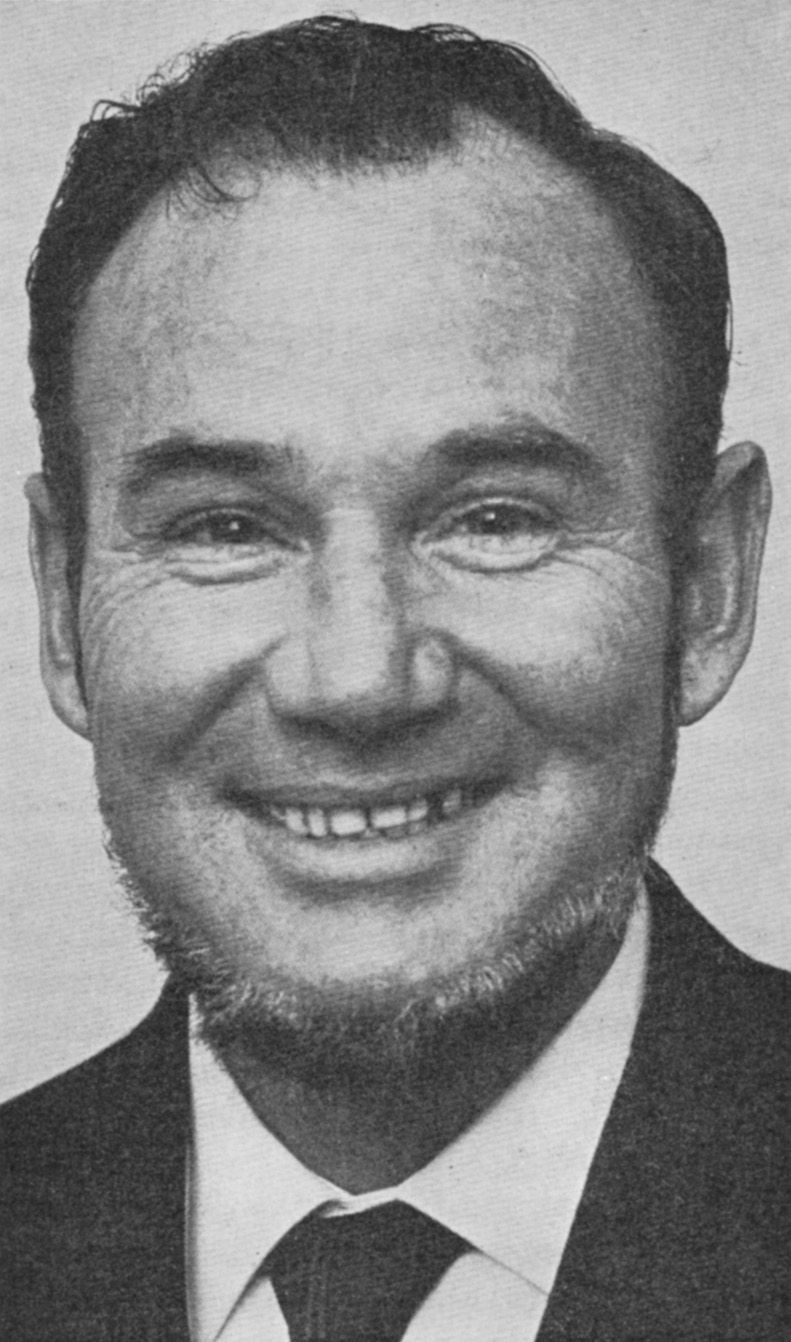
- Born: Stephanus Petrus Daniël le Roux; 13 June 1922; Oudtshoorn, Western Cape, Union of South Africa
- Died: 30 December 1989 (aged 67)
- Education: Grey College Bloemfontein Stellenbosch University
- Occupation: Writer
- Writing career
- Language: Afrikaans

Etienne Leroux (born Stephanus Petrus Daniël le Roux; 13 June 1922 – 30 December 1989) was an Afrikaans writer and a member of the South African Sestigers literary movement.

== Early life and career ==
Etienne Leroux was born in Oudtshoorn in the Western Cape on 13 June 1922 as Stephanus Petrus Daniël le Roux, son of Stephanus Petrus le Roux, a South African Minister of Agriculture. He studied law at Stellenbosch University (BA, LLB) and worked for a short time at a solicitor's office in Bloemfontein. From 1946 he farmed and lived as a writer on his farm in the Koffiefontein district. Etienne was a pupil at Grey College Bloemfontein where he matriculated.

An English translation of his 1964 novel Een vir Azazel (lit. "One for Azazel") was published in 1968 as One for the Devil. In his book review for One for the Devil, Graham Greene wrote: "His audience will be the audience that only a good writer can merit, an audience which assembles slowly from far away in ones and twos; while the big book club motorcoaches hurtle down the highway toward oblivion, the rumour spreads that here an addition will be found to the literature of our time."

Several of his books were banned by the government of South Africa.

He died on 30 December 1989, and was buried at the family church yard of Wamakersdrift, of which his farm formed part.

== Bibliography ==
- Die eerste lewe van Colet (1955)
- Hilaria (1957)
- Die mugu (1959)
- Sewe dae by die Silbersteins (1962). Seven Days at the Silbersteins, trans. Charles Eglington (Boston: Houghton Mifflin, 1964). Also translated by Greg Penfold (2013).
- Een vir Azazel (1964). One for the Devil, trans. Charles Eglington (Houghton Mifflin, 1968).
- Die derde oog (1966). The Third Eye, trans. Amy Starke (Houghton Mifflin, 1969).
- 18-44 (1967). 18-44, trans. Cassandra Perrey (Houghton Mifflin, 1972).
- IsisIsisIsis (1969)
- Na'va (1972)
- Magersfontein, o Magersfontein! (1976). Magersfontein, O Magersfontein!, trans. Ninon Roets (Hutchinson, 1983).
- Onse Hymie (1982)

=== Compilations ===
- Die Silberstein-trilogie (1984). Includes: Sewe dae by die Silbersteins; Een vir Azazel; Die derde oog
- Die eerste siklus (1986). Includes: Die eerste lewe van Colet; Hilaria; Die mugu
- Die 18-44 trilogie (2008). Includes: 18-44; IsisIsisIsis; Na’va

The English translations of Die Silberstein-trilogie were also published as a single volume: To a Dubious Salvation: A Trilogy of Fantastical Novels (Penguin, 1972).

== Awards and honours ==
- 1964: Hertzog Prize (Prose) for Sewe dae by die Silbersteins
- 1964: CNA Literary Award for Een vir Azazel
- 1976: CNA Literary Award for Magersfontein, o Magersfontein!
- 1979: Hertzog Prize (Prose) for Magersfontein, o Magersfontein!
