= Thelma Gutsche =

South African filmmaker, film historian, writer and arts patron

- Thelma Gutsche
- Born: 7 January 1915; Somerset West, Cape Province
- Died: 5 November 1984 (aged 69); Montagu, Western Cape
- Education: University of Cape Town
- Occupations: Filmmaker; film historian; writer; arts patron

Thelma Gutsche (7 January 1915 – 5 November 1984) was a South African filmmaker, film historian, writer, and arts patron, referred to as "South Africa's most accomplished early cinema historian" by a later film scholar.

== Early life and education ==
Thelma Gutsche was born at Somerset West, Cape Province, the daughter of Jesse Gutsche and Agnes Patricia Anne Mackintosh Gutsche. Her father was a factory manager. She earned degrees at the University of Cape Town in the Ethics, Logic, and Philosophy program. In 1946 she completed her doctoral studies in social history, with a dissertation titled The History and Social Significance of Motion Pictures in South Africa 1895 - 1940. Her dissertation was later published as a book, about which one scholar said, "As a detailed historical account of cinema up to 1940, there is nothing to rival it."

== Career ==
Before and during her doctoral program Gutsche wrote film reviews for The Forum and the Cape Times newspapers. During World War II and afterward, she wrote and directed documentaries and instructional films for the South African government. From 1947 to 1959 she was head of Educational and Information Service of African Consolidated Films Ltd. She was also joint director of Silver Leaf Books, which published the first book of short stories by Nadine Gordimer during her tenure.

Gutsche was a founding member and life president of the Association of Friends of the Johannesburg Art Gallery, and in 1959 a founding member of the Simon van der Stel Foundation (a historic preservation foundation). She was a member of the Africana Museum Advisory Committee beginning in 1956, and a member of the Consultative Committee of the Bensusan Museum of Photography. She served a term as president of the National Council of Women in South Africa.

== Works ==
Gutsche wrote several books, including

- Do You Know Johannesburg. Unie-Volkspers. 1947. with Patricia Knox
- No Ordinary Woman: The Life and Times of Florence Phillips. H. Timmins. 1966., a biography of Florence Phillips, winner of the 1966 Central News Agency Literary Award.
- Old Gold: The History of the Wanderers Club. H. Timmins. 1966.
- The Microcosm. H. Timmins. 1968.
- The Bishop's Lady. H. Timmins. 1970., a biography of church architect Sophy Gray)
- A Very Smart Medal: The History of the Witwatersrand Agricultural Society. H. Timmins. 1970.
- The History and Social Significance of Motion Pictures in South Africa, 1895-1940. H. Timmins. 1972.
- There Was a Man: The Life and Times of Sir Arnold Theiler. H. Timmins. 1972. ISBN 9780869781647., a biography of Sir Arnold Theiler

== Personal life ==
Gutsche died in 1984, from emphysema, aged 69 years, in Montagu, Western Cape. Her papers are archived at the University of Cape Town.
