= America's Car Museum =

Automobile museum in Washington, US

LeMay - America's Car Museum
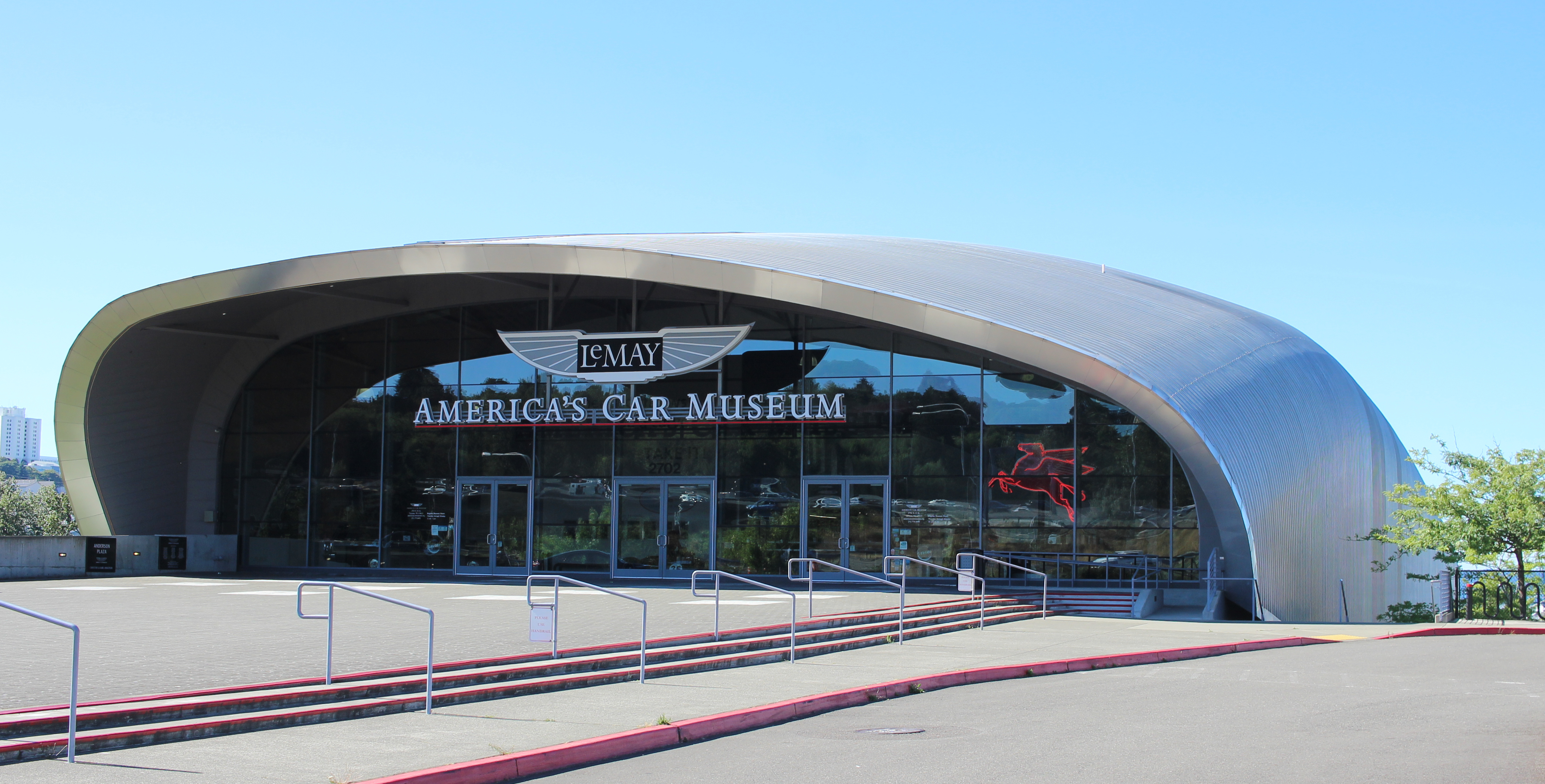
- Established: June 2, 2012; 14 years ago
- Location: Tacoma, Washington, USA
- Coordinates: 47.236°N 122.430°W
- Type: Automobile museum
- Collection size: 350 automobiles
- Visitors: 400,000+ expected annually
- Founders: Harold LeMay and Nancy LeMay
- President: Bruce Patton (Interim CEO)
- Curator: Bruce Patton
- Architects: Alan Grant, LARGE architecture
- Website: www.americascarmuseum.org

LeMay - America's Car Museum is an automotive museum in the city of Tacoma, Washington, United States. Many of the cars on display were donated to the museum by the family of Harold LeMay. The museum is adjacent to the Tacoma Dome and opened on June 2, 2012.

== History ==
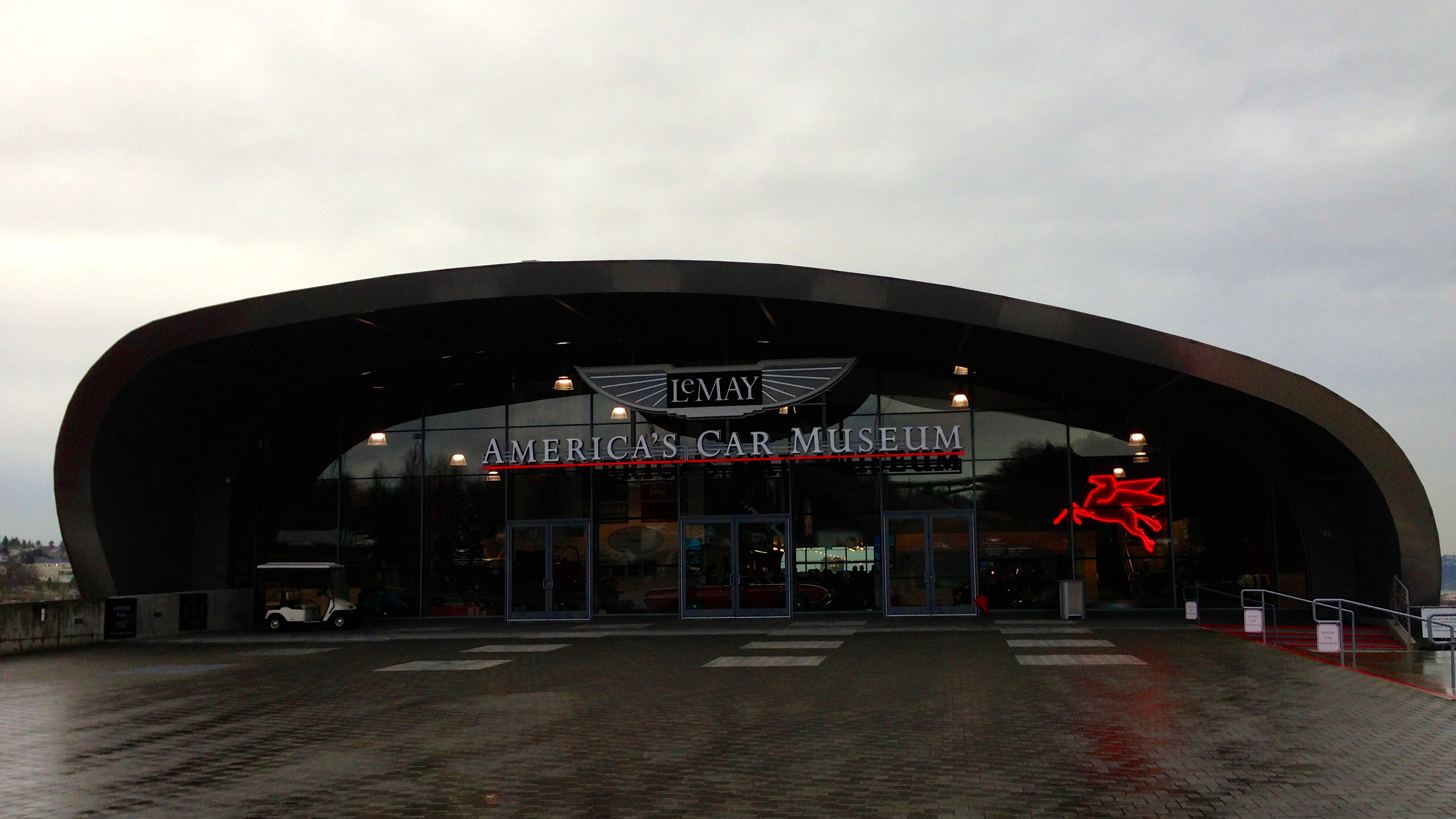
Entrance of America's Car Museum

Harold LeMay owned a successful refuse company, Harold LeMay Enterprises, within the Tacoma metro area and amassed the world's largest private car collection, numbering over 3,000 cars at its peak. After his death, the city of Tacoma donated 10 acres (4.0 ha) of land next to the Tacoma Dome for the museum that would contain some of his car collection. The majority of the collection remains at the LeMay Family Collection at Marymount in nearby Spanaway, Washington.

In 2010, ground broke on the museum, designed by Alan Grant of LARGE architecture and constructed by JTM Construction. It was completed in 2012, and over 10,000 people attended the opening ceremony on June 2, 2012.

The museum has 165,000 square feet (1.53 ha) of exhibit space, a 3.5 acre show field, and contains a 350-car gallery showing cars notable for their speed, technology and design, as well as their importance to car culture. The building also contains administrative space, a gift shop, restoration shop, lecture halls, a banquet room, and a café. The asymmetrical metal shell wrapping the building is designed to echo the form of an automobile's shell built over a rectilinear chassis.

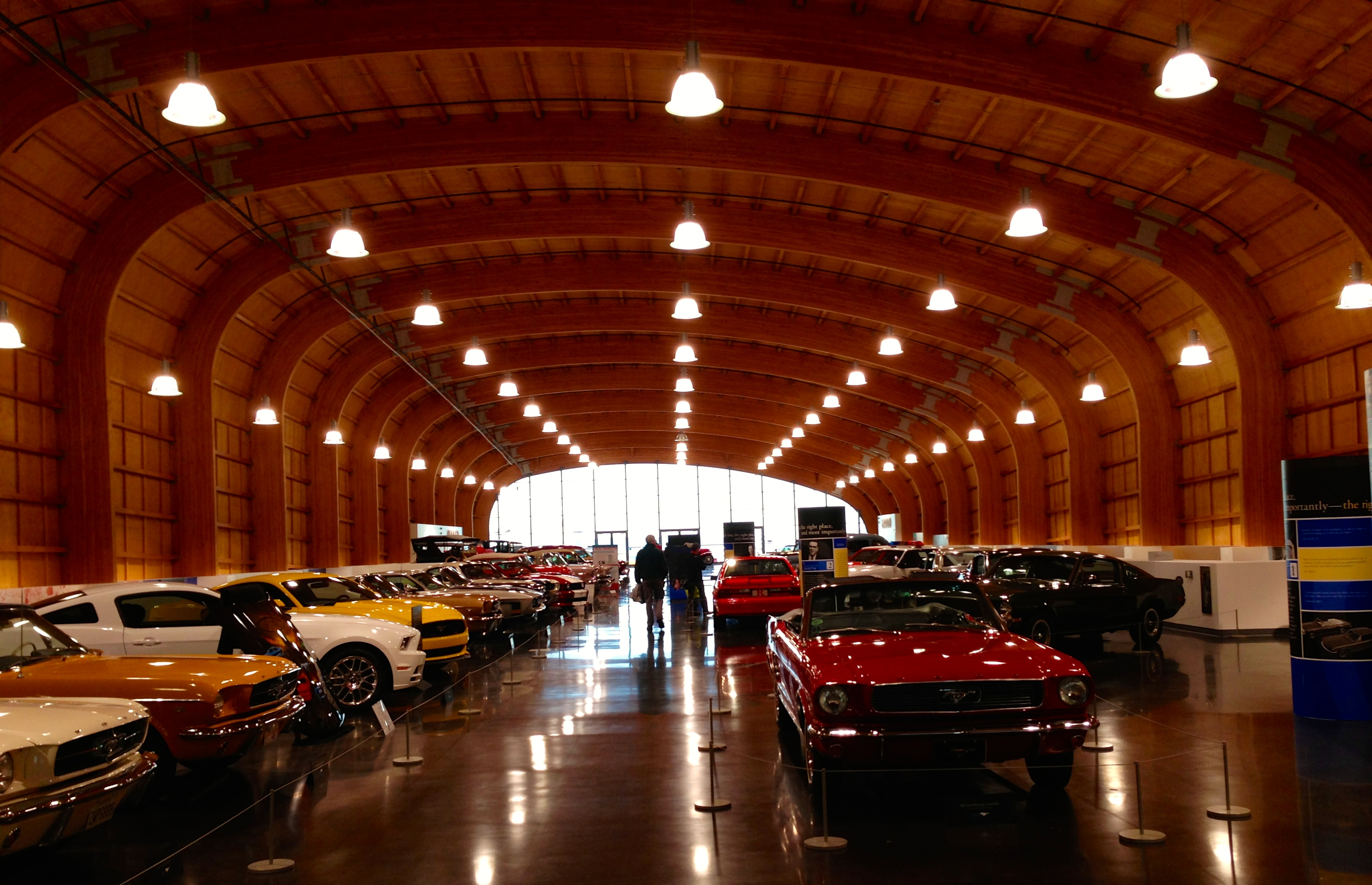
The main floor of America's Car Museum

From the mezzanine level, main level, and outside patio, there are views of Downtown Tacoma, Thea Foss Waterway, Commencement Bay, and the Olympic Mountains. The outdoor show field is suitable for hosting car shows, auctions, swap meets, car club events, new car launches, and a concours d'Elegance.

The museum has had "Club Auto" satellite locations in Tacoma, Washington, Kirkland, Washington, and Lakewood, Colorado.

== Management ==
=== Funding ===
The projected cost of the museum was $100 million. Harold LeMay's wife, Nancy LeMay, donated $15 million to the museum. The land donated to the museum by the City of Tacoma is estimated to be worth $17 million.

The American Automobile Association (AAA) of Washington made the largest corporate donation to date with its 2008 commitment of $1.6 million. Other major museum sponsors are Bonhams, Napa Auto Parts, Boeing, The News Tribune, and State Farm Insurance. Other donors include various car collectors, auto clubs and citizens worldwide.

=== Attendance ===
In 2012, the first year the museum opened, 133,500 people visited. 90,000 people visited the museum in 2024.

== Exhibitions ==
=== Permanent Collections ===
- Classics & Custom Coachwork
- Lucky's Garage
- Legends of Motorsport: The NASCAR Story
- Route 66
- Master Collector (Rotates Annually)
- Powering the Future: Learning Lab

=== Special Exhibitions ===
- American Built
- British Bikes
- For Gold & Glory
- The Birth of the American Supercar

=== Past Exhibitions ===
- 75 Years of Porsche
- Alfa Romeo. Born from Passion.
- American Muscle: Rivals to the End (later Modified Madness)
- An American Legacy – Celebrating the Passion and Vision of Harold & Nancy LeMay
- British Invasion
- Cadillac - The Standard of the World
- Corvette Creativity
- Exotics@ACM
- Ford F-Series: The Truck That Grew Up With America
- Heroes of Bavaria - 75 Years of BMW Motorsports
- Reclaimed Rust: The James Hetfield Collection
- Saleen: A Journey from the Heart of a Racer to America's Supercar
- Shinka - An Immersive Japanese Automobile Exhibit
- Through the Lens – Cars Defined by an American Century
- Tools of the Trade - Powering the Working Class
- Tuners@ACM
