= Nancy LeMay =

American car enthusiast and collector (born 1936)

- Born: May 3, 1936 (age 90); Porter, Washington, U.S.
- Known for: Car collecting
- Spouse: Harold LeMay
- Children: 8

Nancy LeMay (born May 3, 1936) is an American car enthusiast and collector.

Nancy met Harold LeMay in the early 1960s, and they were married in 1963; between them they had eight children.

One thing Nancy and Harold bonded over was their collections. This included hundreds of vintage cars, but also a great deal of Americana, from toys to signs to dental equipment. While Harold is often cited as the collector of the family, Nancy was just as passionate about it as him. She even got her commercial driver's license endorsement, in case it was needed for some of the larger vehicles in their collection.

Harold and Nancy started the Annual LeMay Car Show in the late 1970s. Then, it was a small gathering of family friends. In the decades since then, Nancy has continued to host the show as it has grown into a much-anticipated annual event, drawing thousands of people each year.

By 1998, the LeMay family collection was listed in the Guinness Book of World Records as the “Largest Antique & Vintage Vehicle Collection." At that point, the collection held more than 1,900 vehicles. Harold lived just past his 81st birthday, dying in 2000. By then, the couple’s collection was estimated to have over 3,000 cars.

After Harold’s death, Nancy continued to build and maintain their collections. At one point, Harold had hoped to have a museum for his cars so that the public could view them and the collection wouldn't be broken up after his death. For more than a decade, Nancy LeMay and her family worked to fundraise and build support to open the LeMay - America's Car Museum in downtown Tacoma. Though cars from a number of collections are displayed, Nancy sits on the board for the museum and the LeMay family has donated hundreds of cars to America's Car Museum.

The LeMay Family Collection Foundation is a non-profit started by Nancy LeMay and family in 2010. Directly owned and overseen by the family, this museum houses over 500 cars in 3 buildings and is open to the public for tours 6 days a week. This collection is housed at historic Marymount in Tacoma, Washington.

Nancy has been active in the community in a variety of other ways; she donated $100,000 to Pierce County Parks and Recreation to build the Harold LeMay Skatepark at Sprinker Recreation Center. On May 28, 2011, Harold and Nancy LeMay were inducted into the Washington State Hot Rod Hall of Fame. In 2013, Nancy was a recipient of the Lee Iacocca Award, given to honor “a person who, over time, has demonstrated an extraordinary dedication to the classic car hobby through vehicle preservation, club participation, and one who has unselfishly assisted and encouraged others in perpetuating an ‘American Automotive Tradition.’”
