= LeMay Family Collection Foundation =

American foundation

Coordinates: 47.12103°N 122.42650°W

The LeMay Family Collection Foundation was born out of Harold LeMay's dream of keeping his massive car collection together and in a place where others could appreciate it. Separate from America's Car Museum in downtown Tacoma, the LeMay Family Collection is still directly owned and controlled by the LeMay family.

Today, the museum is open to the public 6 days a week. About 500 cars are on display in the collection at all times, with some being rotated into or out of off-site storage. The collection is located at the historic Marymount Military Academy, which housed a school for boys and a home for nuns before it became a home for Harold and Nancy LeMay's vintage car collection.

The LeMay Family Collection Foundation is also the site of the annual LeMay Car Show.

The LeMay Family Collection Foundation was nominated for one of King 5's Best Museums in Western Washington in 2013. It placed 14th out of more than 60 nominees. In 2015, the Collection placed in the top 5.
