= Armand Lemay =

French architect (1873–1963)

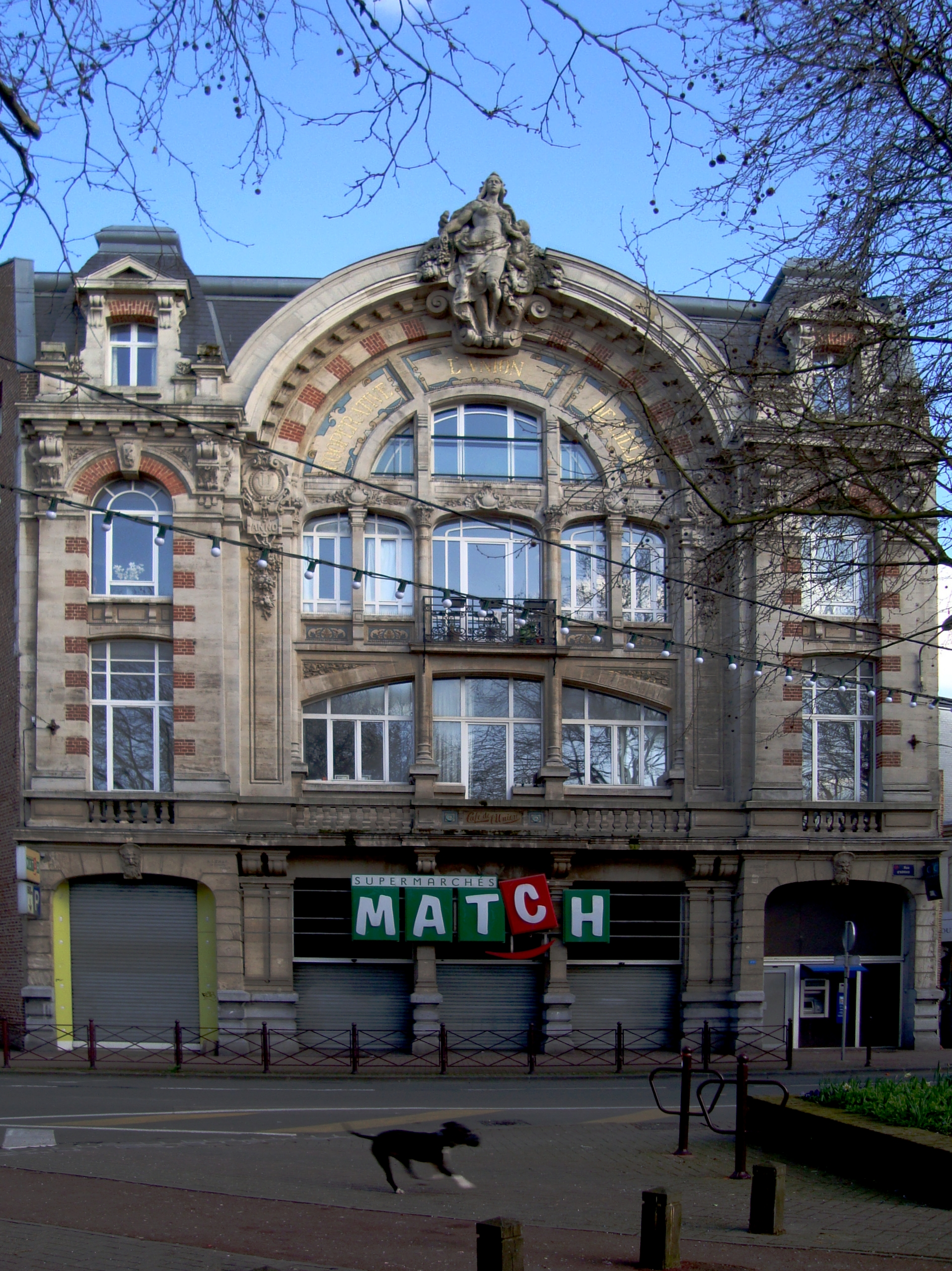
- Maison du Peuple or L'Union, Lille, designed by Lemay, 1898–1902
- Born: 11 October 1873; Lille, France
- Died: 1963 (aged 89–90); Lille, Belgium
- Education: Ecole des Beaux-Arts, Lille
- Occupation: architect
- Children: Armand Ernest LeMay

Armand Henri Georges Lemay (11 October 1873 – 1963) was a French architect, one of the many prominent designers active in Lille during the era of extensive growth before the First World War.

== Biography ==
Lemay was born in Lille soon after the end of the Franco-Prussian War, the son of a blacksmith, Adolphe François Pierre Lemay. He matriculated to the local Ecole des Beaux-Arts in Lille where he studied under Emile Vandenburgh, himself a Lille native, who had studied in the atelier of the great Henri Labrouste in the 1850s at the central Ecole des Beaux-Arts in Paris.

Lemay launched his career in Lille in 1898, during an era of the city's rapid expansion, along with its neighbors Roubaix and Tourcoing, into one of the great regional centers of industry in modern France. Already interested in collective housing and places of leisure, in 1898 he was commissioned to design the new Union de Lille, also known as the city's Maison du Peuple, which, like its counterparts in the Low Countries and neighboring regions–most famously Victor Horta's Maison du Peuple in Brussels–functioned as a kind of cultural, recreational, and social services center for the city's many industrial workers, which included a grocery store and café. The year it was finished, 1902, Lemay also designed several temporary buildings for the Exposition Internationale de Lille, including the Palace of Liberal Arts, the Illuminated Pavilion and the Machine Hall with most of the industrial exhibits.

In 1903, he became the principal architect of the new street called the "rue Beau-Séjour," later the rue Gounod, in Lille's Saint-Maurice Pellevoisin district, where he and other designers erected a now well-known series of single-family regionalist townhouses built of brick, wood, and tile in a characteristically picturesque style.

Lemay also built several other grand villas for upper-middle-class clients, particularly along Lille's Grand Boulevard, opened in 1907, a broad, tree-lined avenue with a wide median, which links Lille with both Roubaix and Tourcoing to the north, adjoining the Belgian border.

Following the First World War, Lemay was one of the designers involved in the interwar reconstruction.

== Family ==
Armand Lemay married Jeanne Eugénie Silvie Mannier, and they had a son, Armand Ernest Lemay (1901–1957) who also became an architect and joined his father's practice in 1931. Armand Ernest Lemay, having studied under Georges Dehaudt at the Ecole régionale d'architecture in Lille, went on to the national Ecole des Beaux-Arts in Paris, where he studied in the atelier of Paul Bigot, receiving his diploma in 1930.

== Works ==
Very productive, Armand Lemay completed several buildings in and around Lille, including public buildings, private townhouses, large villas, theaters and cafés, etc.). Like many architects of the period (and particularly those who worked in the Nord département), he was proficient in a number of different styles, including the various strains of classicism, eclecticism, and sometimes Art Nouveau and Art Deco.

- Maison du Peuple (also known as "L'Union," or "Café d'Union"), Lille (1898–1902)
- Houses on the rue Gounod, Lille (starting in 1903)
- 3–5, place Désiré Bouchée, Lille (ca. 1905)
- 88, rue du Faubourg de Roubaix, Lille (ca. 1905)
- 92, rue du Faubourg de Roubaix, Lille (ca. 1905)
- 13, rue Colson, Lille (ca. 1905)
- Villa Mortesie, 202, rue du Faubourg de Roubaix, Lille (ca. 1905)
- Château Franchomme, 1002, avenue de la République, Marcq-en-Baroeul (1908)
- Maison 7bis, rue Desmazières, Lille (1910)
- 25–29, boulevard Carnot, Lille (circa 1910)
- 117–119, avenue de la République, La Madeleine (ca. 1910)
- Magasin Sigrand et Cie, 16–20, rue Neuve, Lille (1910)
- 7, boulevard Carnot, Lille (1911)
- Hôtel Bellevue, Lille (1912)
- Hôtel Carlton, Lille (1920)
- 8, rue des Ponts de Comines, Lille (ca. 1924)
- 7–11, rue Pierre Mauroy, Lille (ca. 1924)
- 175, boulevard de la Liberté, Lille (ca. 1925)
- 55, rue de Béthune, Lille (ca. 1925)
- 61, rue de Béthune, Lille (ca. 1925)
- 5, rue Jean Sans Peur, Lille (ca. 1926)
- Le 57, 6, rue du Court Debout/57, rue de Béthune, Lille (1927)
- Église Saint-Jean-Baptiste, Steenwerck (1928)
- Automobile Palace, Lille (1928)
- 36, rue Saint-Sébastien, Lille (ca. 1928)
- 75–83, boulevard Carnot, Lille (ca. 1930)
- 22–24, rue Anatole France, Lille (ca. 1930)
- Patou Maternity Hospital, Lille (1930; demolished 1998)
- Hôtel de la Mutualité, 9–11, boulevard Vauban, Lille (1932)
- Apartment houses at 1, 9, 56bis, 64 et 141 boulevard de la Liberté (Lille) (circa 1935)

== Photo Gallery ==
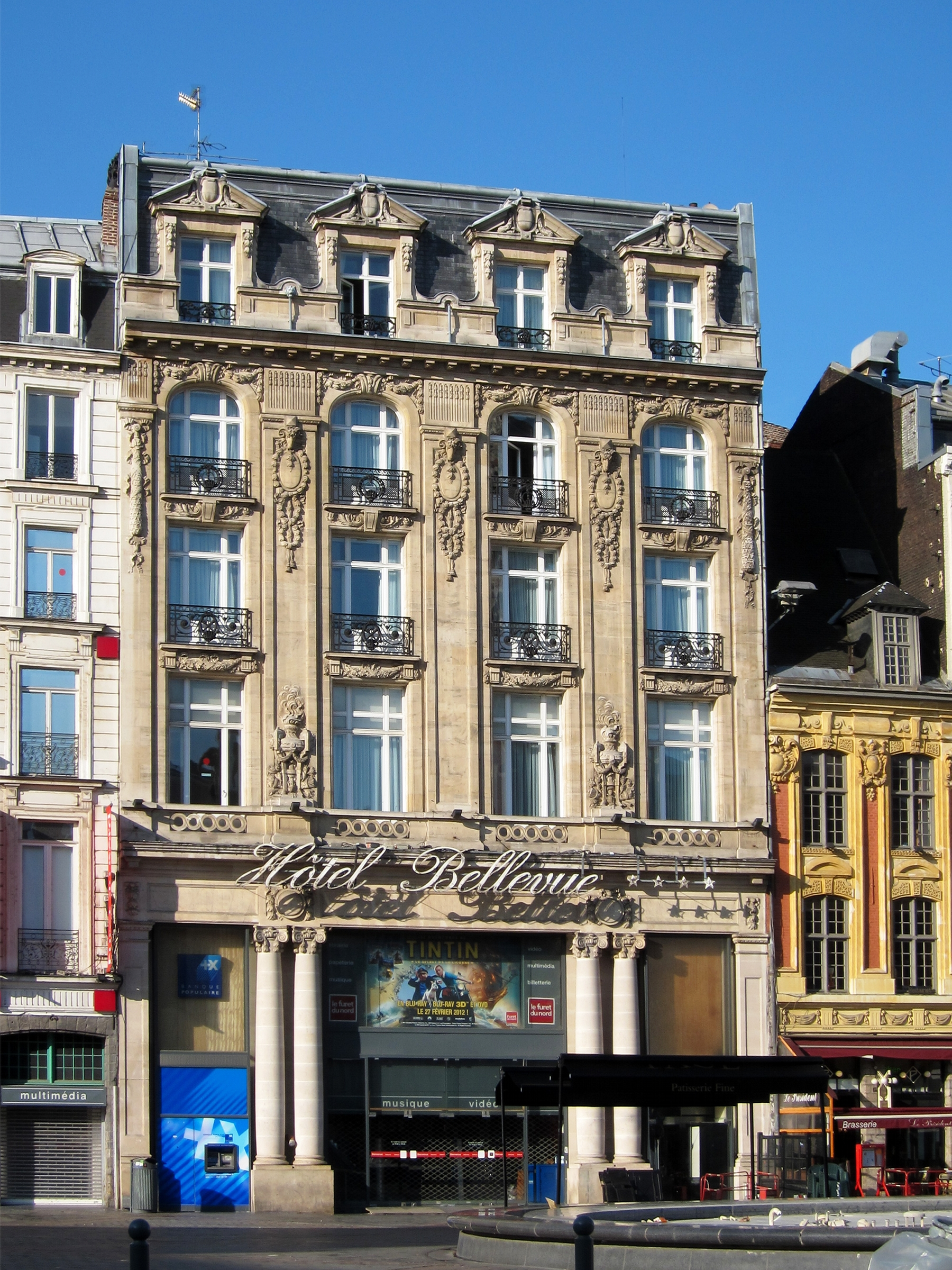
Hotel Bellevue, Lille

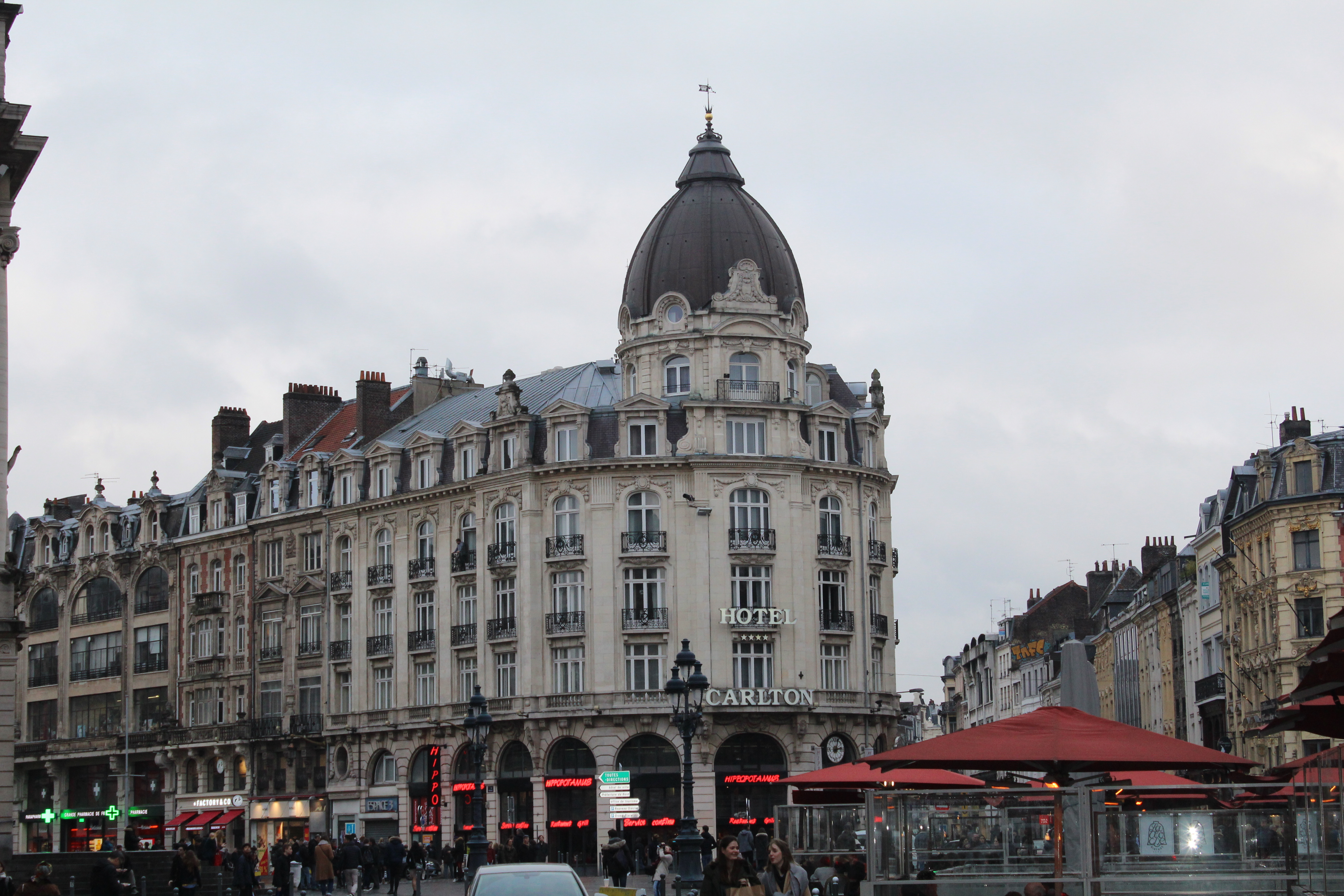
Hôtel Carlton, Lille

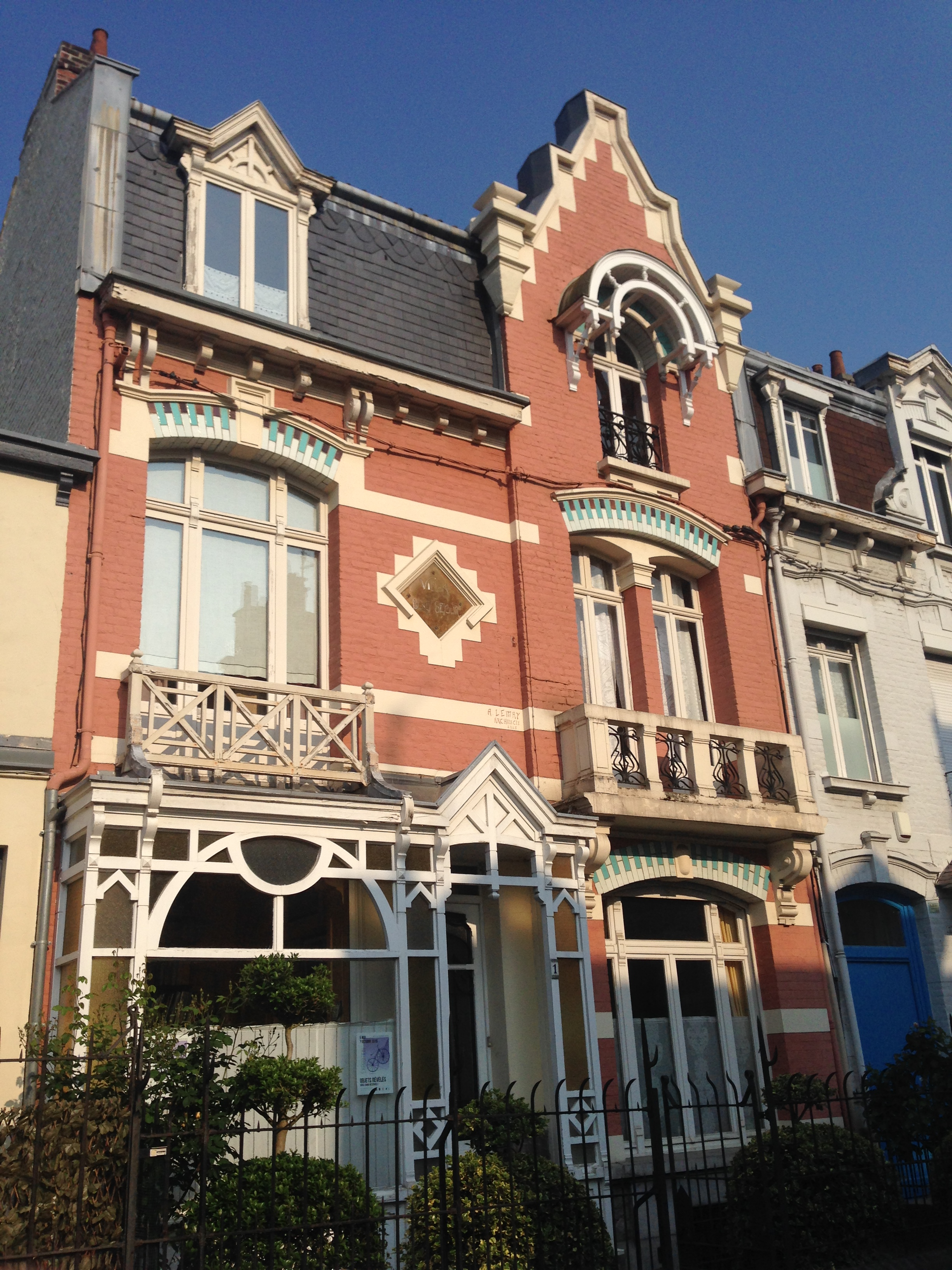
Villa "Beau Séjour" on the rue Gounod, Lille

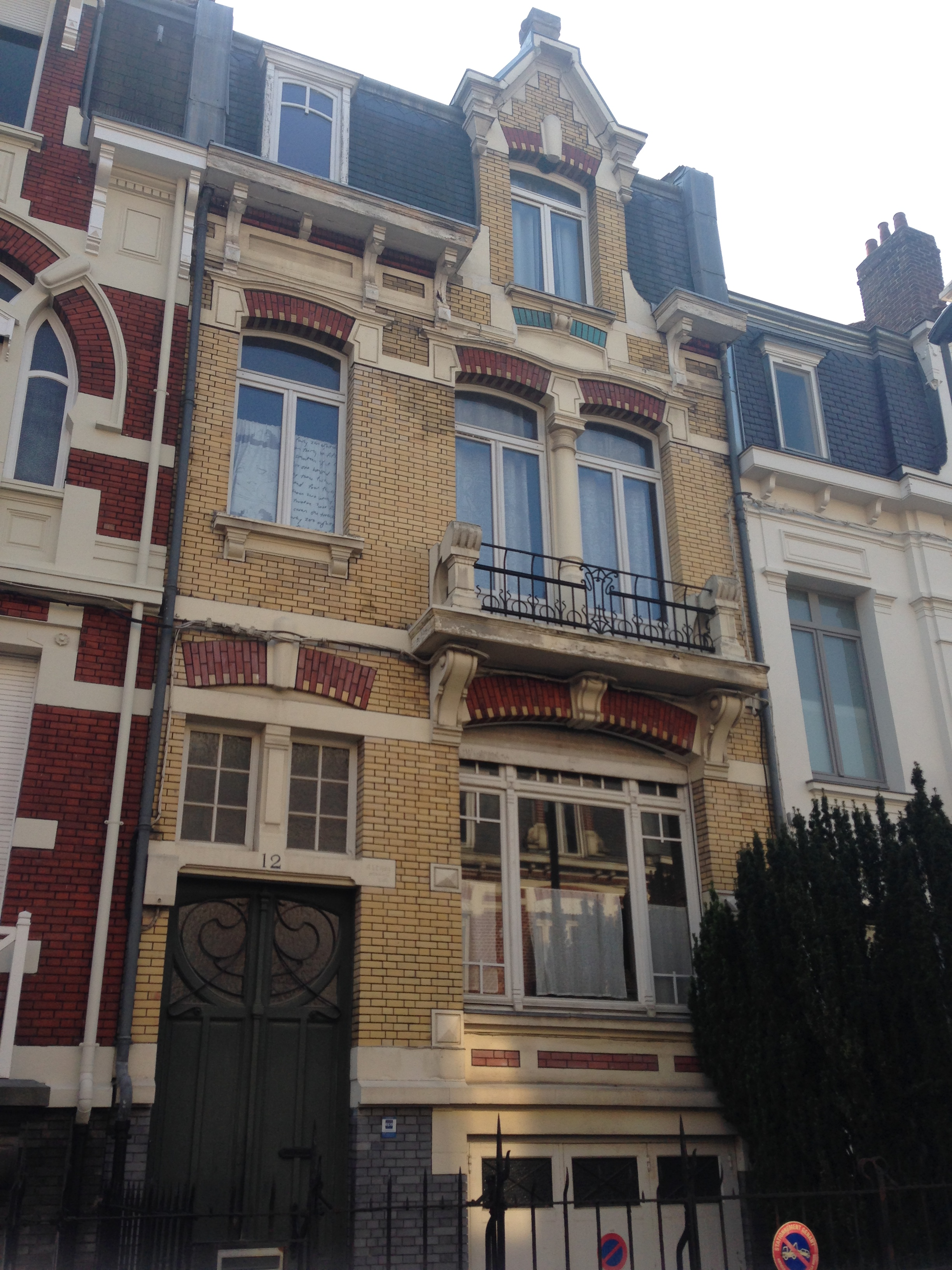
12 rue Gounod, Lille

== Bibliography ==
- Diana Palazova-Lebleu, Problématiques de l'architecture d'Armand Lemay, Mémoire de DEA, Université Charles de Gaulle - Lille III, 2004
