= Dominique Lemay =

French humanitarian (born 1950)

- Born: July 17, 1950 (age 76); Wasquehal, France
- Other name: Kuya Dom
- Education: Catholic University of Paris
- Occupation: Social worker
- Spouse(s): Adelita "Adelle" Ceradoy-Lemay, RSW
- Writing career
- Language: French, English, Filipino
- Website: virlaniekuyadom.blogspot.com

Dominique Lemay (born July 17, 1950) is a French humanitarian known for founding the Virlanie Foundation, which helps street children and children at risk in the Philippines.

== Biography ==
Lemay was born in Wasquehal, France on July 17, 1950. He holds a degree in theology from the Catholic University of Paris. He obtained a master's degree in sociology in 1973, and a master's degree in Social Work in 1987 from Fondation INFA, Nogent-sur-Marne. He left for Manila after his studies to work for children on the street.

Lemay arrived in the Philippines in 1989 at the request of a friend to do some research on street children of Philippines.

In 1992, with the help of his Filipino friends and social workers, Lemay started the Virlanie Foundation to help the needy children of Philippines. The organization works to take care of children who are poor, abandoned, orphaned, neglected and abused and provide them with a suitable environment to live in. The foundation also strives to make sure that there is a strong presence that can fight for the rights of children. Virlanie also supports the operation of the Manila Youth Reception Center along with the Reception Action Center. In addition, the foundation operates two homes for children with special needs, Cavite and in Makati City. The foundation also operates an Open Day Center in Bacolod City in the Visayas.

The name Virlanie is a contraction of the names of his daughters from his first wife, Virginie and Lauriane. After stepping down from Virlanie Foundation, Lemay was named chairman emeritus. He also operates an autonomous farm for people with special needs in Negros Occidental called Virlanie Faith.

Lemay is the author of the book, "Ils N'ont Pas Choisi les Troittoirs de Manille" ("They Didn't Choose the Sidewalks of Manila").

LeBron James visited the foundation in 2015.

== Awards ==
In 2014 Lemay was honored with Chevalier (Knight) in the French Légion d’honneur for his work in the Philippines. Additional awards include:

- Inducted into the Knights of Rizal
- People of Asia magazine selected him as one of its People of the Year in 2008.
- He was awarded the Human Rights Prize from the French Republic for the Foundation's valuable contribution to human rights through its work with disadvantaged children in the Philippines in 2001.
