= Elizabeth Lemay =

Canadian author and columnist (born 1990)

- Born: January 17, 1990 (age 36); Montreal, Quebec, Canada
- Education: Université de Montréal
- Occupations: Writer, columnist
- Writing career
- Genres: Fiction, essay

Elizabeth Lemay is a Canadian author and columnist born on January 17, 1990, in Montreal.

== Biography ==
Elizabeth Lemay pursued studies in French literature at the Université de Montréal before working in public relations. She worked for Denis Coderre as a spokesperson. She also served as spokesperson for the Ensemble Montréal party. She later developed a body of written work informed by feminist and activist perspectives.

== Career ==
Elizabeth Lemay became notable through her first novel, Daddy Issues, published in 2022 by Éditions du Boréal. She followed with L'Été de la colère, a fragmented narrative expressing a critique of social norms and expectations imposed on women.

Her work is a continuation of similar authors like Nelly Arcan, Annie Ernaux, Simone de Beauvoir, Françoise Sagan, Virginia Woolf and Virginie Despentes, to whom she explicitly refers in her analysis of the contradictions and constraints imposed on women. Her writing is direct and engaged, addressing themes of anger, emancipation, the body, and female sexuality, as well as power relations between genders.

== Awards ==
In 2025 Elizabeth Lemay received the Janette-Bertrand Literature Prize for L'Été de la colère, an award recognizing works addressing gender equality, women's autonomy, and the fight against gender-based violence. The jury, chaired by Pauline Marois, highlighted the strength and critical scope of her work, which sheds light on patriarchal dynamics and their effects.

== Media activity and controversy ==
Alongside her literary career, Elizabeth Lemay regularly appears in Quebec media as a columnist. In February 2026, she took part in the program De l'huile sur le feu broadcast on Radio-Canada, where she delivered a segment that sparked controversy. A promotional clip of her interview, addressing male loneliness from a feminist perspective, was removed from social media by Radio-Canada, triggering public debate and reactions. Lemay criticized this decision, arguing that it encourages online harassment campaigns against feminist discourse and reflects a misunderstanding of digital dynamics.

== Works ==
- Daddy Issues, Éditions du Boréal, 2022, ISBN 978-2764629116
- L'Été de la colère, Éditions du Boréal, 2024, ISBN 978-2764628379

== See also ==
- Feminism
- Patriarchy (sociology)
