= Godfrey Le May =

South African historian and academic (1920–2012)

Godfrey Hugh Lancelot Le May (1920–2012) was a South African historian and academic. He became a Fellow and Dean of History at Worcester College, Oxford.

== Early life ==
He was born on 7 September 1920 in South Africa, the son of Hugh Le May, and was educated at Ridge School and Michaelhouse. In 1939 he was working as a reporter on the Johannesburg Star.

Le May graduated B.A. from Rhodes University College as a Milner Prizeman in 1941. In 1942 he was in Khartoum as Assistant Editor on The Sudan Star.

In 1948 Le May entered Worcester College, Oxford, and graduated in Modern History in 1950. In 1951 he was an Official British War Historian.

== University of the Witwatersrand ==
In 1953 Le May became the first Professor at the University of the Witwatersrand in the new department of Local Government and Public Administration. His teaching came to be in the area of practical politics, and he worked against apartheid in academia. He gave public lectures, and wrote for the Rand Daily Mail.

Le May and the lawyer Rex Walsh were involved with Robert Birley and his wife Elinor Margaret née Frere during the Birleys' time at the university from 1964 to the end of 1966. It was a period of campaigning against apartheid, and contacts with Nelson Mandela and Winnie Mandela, particular over their daughters' schooling.

Le May in 1964 replaced Hermann Hahlo on the University Council. He became Dean of Arts there, and resigned in 1967, moving in 1968 to Oxford. He left with a reputation as "an authority on the Milnerite reconstruction in the aftermath of the Anglo-Boer War."

== Later life ==
From 1967 Le May had a position as Fellow and Tutor in Politics at Worcester College, Oxford, to 1990, when he retired. He dies as an emeritus Fellow of the College in 2012.

== Family ==
Le May married, firstly in 1943 at Khartoum, Jean Elysoun Lynedoch Graham, daughter of Gavin L. Graham and his wife Hester Cloete; the couple had one daughter. The marriage was dissolved in 1956. He married secondly Marian Isabel Watson.

== Works ==
- British Government, 1914-1953, London: Methuen, 1955
- Freedom and Authority; text of an address given 5 September 1962, Johannesburg: Witswatersrand Univ., 1963
- British Government, 1914-1963, London: Methuen, 1964
- British Supremacy in South Africa, 1899-1907, Oxford: Clarendon, 1965. A review by Eric Thomas Stokes commented that the work was "more in the nature of a careful, interpretative essay than a definitive monograph", and noted that the use very largely of British records was a flaw shared with other works that also neglected South African agency. It has been considered a sequel to The Fall of Kruger's Republic (1961) by JS Marais.
- South Africa, the future: text of an address by Prof. G.H.L LeMay, 5 September 1967, Cape Town: C.A. Alger, 1967
- Black and White in South Africa, New York: American Heritage, 1971
- The Victorian Constitution, New York: St. Martin, 1979. A review by J. Morgan Sweeney of Michigan State University commented that Le May "sets as his task the elaboration of Victorian constitutional conventions, those "customs, usages, understandings and beliefs" which underlay the political process in the period between the parliamentary reform bills of 1832 and the outbreak of World War I in 1914."
- The Afrikaners, New York: Wiley, 1995
