= Robert Lemay =

Canadian composer (born 1960)

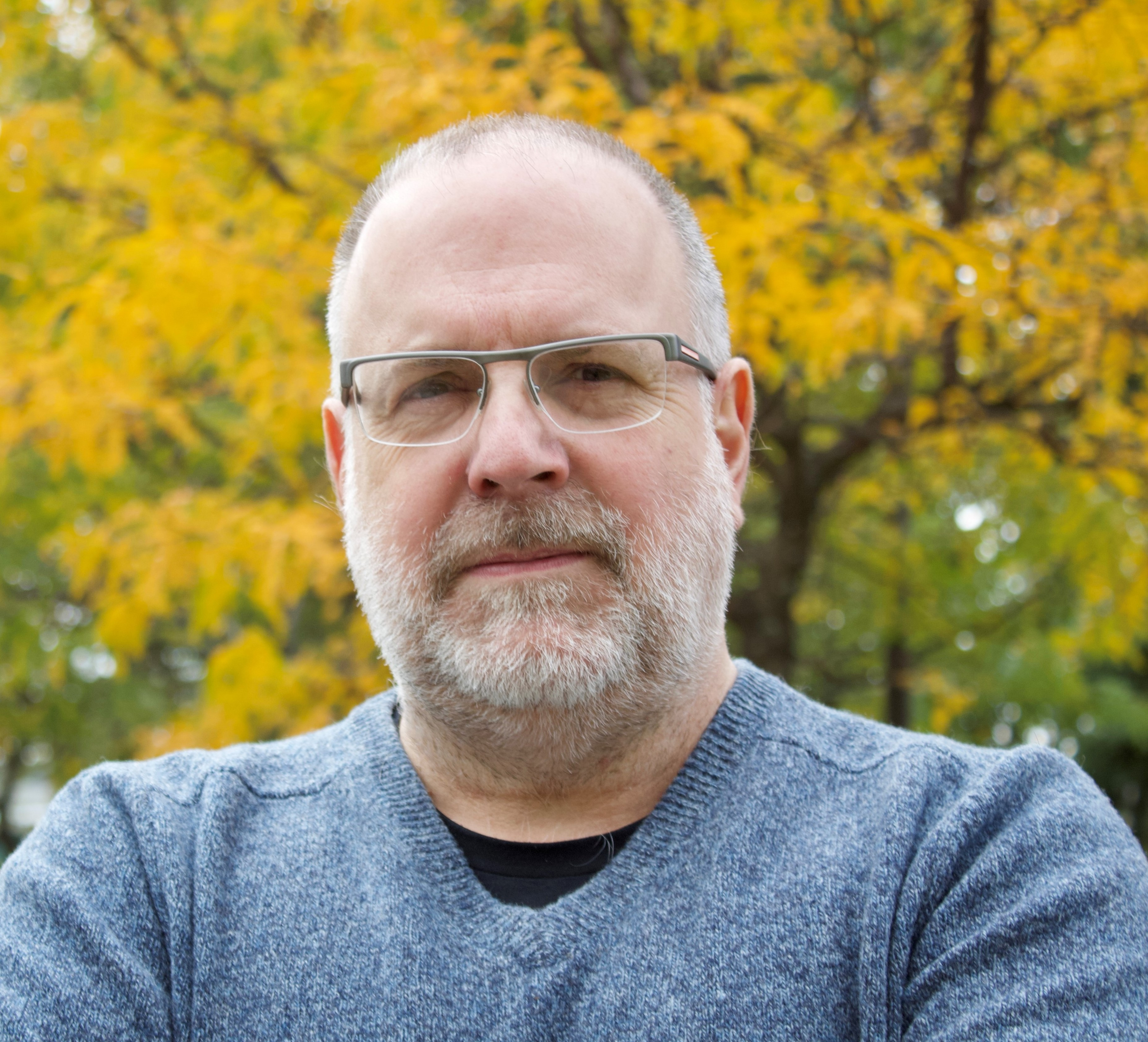
- Robert Lemay (2016)
- Born: February 13, 1960 (age 66); Montreal, Quebec, Canada
- Education: Université de Montréal; Laval University
- Occupations: Composer, educator
- Spouse: Yoko Hirota

Robert Lemay (born February 13, 1960) is a Canadian composer of solo, chamber and orchestral works.

== Early years and education ==
Born in Montreal, Lemay studied at Laval University, where he received his Master's degree (M.Mus.) under François Morel. He completed a doctorate (D.Mus.) at the Université de Montréal under Michel Longtin in 1994. He also spent a year at the State University of New York at Buffalo, where he studied with David Felder and attended seminars given by Brian Ferneyhough, Louis Andriessen, and Donald Erb. During this time, he met his wife, the pianist Yoko Hirota. In France, he worked with François Rossé in Bordeaux and Georges Aperghis at the Atelier Théâtre et Musique in Paris.

== Career ==
Lemay has been described as having "made significant and substantial contributions to the saxophone repertoire." Of his over 140 works, 80 are for (or include) the saxophone, ranging from solos to large ensembles. Since the late 1980s, he has collaborated with artists of the instrument such as Jean-François Guay, Jean-Michel Goury, and Jean-Marie Londeix.

Since 2000, Lemay has resided in Sudbury, Ontario where he taught at Laurentian University from 2000 to 2021. He also taught at the University of Saskatchewan in 1996-97.

From 2004 to 2018, Lemay was President and Artistic Director of the 5-Penny New Music Concerts in Sudbury, where he worked extensively with the Silver Birch String Quartet.

Lemay was Composer-in-Residence of the Sudbury Symphony Orchestra from 2008 to 2010.

== Compositional style ==
Lemay is an atonal composer who has been influenced by the spectral techniques of Tristan Murail and Gérard Grisey, the modal approaches of Olivier Messiaen and Iannis Xenakis, and the rhythmic modulation of Elliott Carter. He also has discussed his process for the creation of melodic material.

The treatment of the concert setting — including stage layout, spatialization, gesture, and comportment and presence of the performer — is another stylistic concern, which was also the subject of Lemay's thesis and other writings.

The employment of extended instrumental techniques has been analyzed in-depth in two of Lemay's solo pieces, Ariana, Kaboul (alto saxophone) and Clap (clarinet).

Lemay has also written pieces for students including 6 Ushebtis (piano), Train miniature (clarinet), and Beat the Drum (alto saxophone).

== Awards ==
Lemay is a laureate of national and international composition competitions including:

- Second prize. 2007. International Composition Prize (Luxembourg) for Mare Tranquilitatis III.
- Second prize. 2006. Kazimierz Serocki International Composers' Competition (Poland) for De brises en ressac.
- First prize. 2004. Harelbeke Muziekstad Wind Ensemble Competition (Belgium) for Ramallah.
- William St. Clair Low Award. 1989. Composers, Authors and Publishers Association of Canada (CAPAC) for Vagues vertiges.
- Sir Ernest MacMillan Award. 1988. CAPAC for La fuite immobile.
- Rodolphe Mathieu Award. 1988. CAPAC for Les yeux de la solitude.

== Works ==
The bibliography below is arranged by date of composition, title of the work, instrument(s), publisher (if applicable), and premiere, including performer(s), venue and date. Unpublished works are at the Canadian Music Centre. The CMC Music Library also has his complete works.

=== Solos, duos ===
- Quatre études pour saxophone baryton. 2025. Premiere: Jeffrey Leung, saxophone. NASA's Biennial Conference. Ohio State University Columbus, OH March 14, 2026
- Cordes croisées. 2024 Double bass and piano. Première: Martin Blanchet (double bass) & Ayano Hodouchi Dempsey (piano). Thunder Bay Community Auditorium, Thunder Bay, Ontario, Canada. June 23, 2025.
- Avec doigté. 2024. Guitar, percussions. Éditions Doberman-Yppan.
- En contrebas. 2024. Double bass and percussion
- Oxymore. 2023. Alto flute and bass drum. Tetractys Publishing.
- À intervalles fixes. 2023. Alto saxophone, percussion. Premiere: Bent Frequency Duo Project (Jan Berry Baker, saxophone, Stuart Gerber, percussion). Kopleff Recital Hall, Georgia State University, September 2023.
- Deuce 6. 2022. Alto saxophone, baritone saxophone. Premiere: Dúo Lisus (Lidia Muñoz; Jesús Núñez, saxophones). Museo de Nerja, Málaga, Spain, March 2024. Resolute Music Publications
- Fingerprints. 2022. Violin, piano. Premiere: Duo Gemini (Jean-Frédéric Molard, violin, Jean-Noël Remiche, piano). Osmose Festival 2022. Espace Toots, Brussels, December 2022
- Deuce 5. 2022. Soprano saxophone, tenor saxophone. Premiere: Altera Inde (Diego Carretero, Sara Zazo). San José College Auditorium (Auditorio Colegio San José), Villafranca de los Barros, Spain. Event: Cantabilex Musical Meeting (Encuentro Musical Cantabilex), July 2022. Resolute Music Publications.
- Low Expectations. 2022. Bass saxophone. Premiere: Geoffrey Deibel, bass saxophone. Longmire Recital Hall, Florida State University, January 2023.
- Nonante. 2021. Saxophone. Éditions Billaudot, Collection Saxiana. Premiere: Mana Takarabe, saxophone. Event: Londeix: une vie pour le saxophone, Conservatoire de Boulogne-Billancourt, France, January 2022.
- Au coude-à-coude. 2021. Bassoon, piano. Note en Bulle Éditions.
- Shared Visions. 2021. Clarinet, piano. Note en Bulle Éditions.
- Play-off. 2021. Oboe, piano. Note en Bulle Éditions.
- Point d'équilibre. 2021. Flute, piano. Note en Bulle Éditions. Premiere: Stephen Tam, flute; YoonHye Eunice Park, piano. Online performance. Richmond Hill, Ontario, February 2022.
- Deep Down. 2020. Tuba, piano. Note en Bulle Éditions.
- Last Call. 2020. French horn, piano. Note en Bulle Éditions.
- L'arc de la lyre. 2020. Harp, piano. Premiere: Kristan Toczko, harp; Jared Tehse, piano. Online performance. Arizona State University, Tempe, Arizona, February 2022.
- À bout de bras. 2020. Trombone, piano. Note en Bulle Éditions.
- Break Point. 2020. B♭ trumpet, piano. Note en Bulle Éditions.
- Soliloques. 2020. Alto saxophone. Note en Bulle Éditions. Premiere: Stéphane Sordet, saxophone. Conservatorio Statale di Musica Nicola Sala, Benevento, Italy, December 2022.
- High Expectations. 2020. Sopranino saxophone. Éditions Doberman-Yppan. Premiere: Alexander Richards, sopranino saxophone. Region 9 Conference of the North American Saxophone Alliance, online event, University of Calgary, March 2021.
- Hors-jeu. 2019. Version B. Tenor saxophone, bass clarinet.
- Hors-jeu. 2019. Tenor saxophone, bassoon. Premiere: Maya Grossman, bassoon, Andrew Hosler, tenor saxophone. Concert series: The_____Experiment, Stamps Auditorium, University of Michigan, Ann Arbor, online event, November 2021.
- À court terme. 2019. B♭ clarinet, cello. Premiere: Géraldine Fastré, clarinet, Bruno Ispiola, cello. Osmose Festival 2019, Entrela du Centre Culturel d'Evere, Brussels, November 2019.
- Faux-fuyant. 2019. Soprano saxophone, oboe. Note en Bulle Éditions. Premiere: Ava Wirth, oboe, Andrew Hosler, soprano saxophone. Kadupal Festival, Stamps Auditorium, University of Michigan, Ann Arbor, online event, September 2021.
- Un processus discret. 2018. Alto saxophone, guitar. Éditions Doberman-Yppan. Premiere: Dúo Icarus (Alberto Plaza, guitar, Alfonso Padilla, saxophone). IX Festival de Música Contemporánea Encuentros Sonoros, Espacio Turina de Sevilla, Seville, Spain, January 2020.
- Double Fault. 2018. Alto saxophone, B♭ clarinet. Note en Bulle Éditions. Premiere: Duo Entre-Nous (Jackie Glazier, clarinet, Don-Paul Kahl, saxophone). North American Saxophone Alliance 2020 Biennial Conference. Arizona State University at Tempe, March 2020.
- Kif-Kif. 2018. Saxophone, snare drum. Note en Bulle Éditions. Premiere: Rogue Two (Andrew Allen, saxophone, Gordon Hicken, snare drum). Akin Auditorium, Midwestern State University, Wichita Falls, Texas, March 2019.
- Two for One. 2018. Soprano saxophone, B♭ trumpet. Note en Bulle Éditions. Premiere: Maelenn Séjourné, soprano saxophone, Mathieu Duc, trumpet. Auditorium du Conservatoire de Rennes, Rennes, France, November 2022.
- Tie-Break 2. 2018. Alto saxophone, violin. Note en Bulle Éditions. Premiere: Emanuele Dalmaso, saxophone, Andrea Mattevi, violin. Festival Contrasti 2019, Sala della Fondazione Caritro, Trento, Italy, March 2019.
- Pommes. 2018. Percussion. Note en Bulle Éditions.
- Déroulement. 2017. Baritone saxophone, piano.
- Arrêt sur image. 2017. Alto saxophone. Éditions Doberman-Yppan. Premiere: William Malone, saxophone. North American Saxophone Alliance Biennial National Conference 2018, Cincinnati, March 2018
- Deuce 4. 2017. Baritone saxophones (2). Resolute Music Publications. Premiere: Jeffrey Vickers, Henrique Portovedo, baritone saxophones. 18th World Saxophone Congress, Zagreb, Croatia, July 2018.
- Bas-relief. 2016-2017. Baritone saxophone. Note en Bulle Éditions. Premiere: Geoffrey Deibel, baritone saxophone. 18th World Saxophone Congress, Zagreb, Croatia, July 2018.
- Into Thin Air. 2016. Soprano saxophone. Éditions Doberman-Yppan. Premiere: Andrew Allen, soprano saxophone. 18th World Saxophone Congress, Zagreb, Croatia, July 2018.
- Fragments noirs. 2016. Soprano saxophone, alto saxophone. Note en Bulle Éditions. Premiere: Noa Mick, Don-Paul Kahl, saxophones. Zurich International Saxfest, Zurich, March 2017.
- À découvert. 2015-16. Violin. Note en Bulle Éditions. Premiere: Christian Robinson, violin. 5-Penny New Music Concerts, Sudbury, June 2016.
- Tri-angles. 2015. Tenor saxophone. Resolute Music Publications. Premiere: Jeffrey Vickers, tenor saxophone. Shenandoah Conservatory, Winchester, Virginia, January 2016.
- Mémoire et oubli. 2015. Piano. Premiere: Yoko Hirota, piano. Laurentian University, Sudbury, March 2016.
- Cadenza. 2014. Violin. Premiere: Christian Robinson, violin. Sudbury Symphony Orchestra concert, Sudbury, March 2015.
- Deuce 3. 2014. Soprano saxophones (2). Resolute Music Publications. Premiere: Jeffrey Vickers, Rodrigo Vila, saxophones. Eckhardt-Gramatté Hall, University of Calgary, February 2015.
- Train miniature. 2014. Clarinet. Éditions Doberman-Yppan, Collection Jean-Guy Boisvert. Premiere: Jean-Guy Boisvert, clarinet. Guest Artist Concert, Don Wright Faculty of Music, Western University, London, Ontario, September 2018.
- Deuce 2. 2013-14. Tenor saxophones (2). Resolute Music Publications. Premiere: Duo d'Entre-Deux (Nick Zoulek, Tommy Davis, saxophones). Clazel Theater, Bowling Green, Ohio, October 2014.
- Asubakatchin (Capteur des rêves/Dreamcatcher). 2013. Piano.
- Tengu-Maï. 2012-13. Soprano saxophone, piano. Resolute Music Publications. Premiere: Kenneth Tse, saxophone, Casey Gene Dierlam, piano. North American Saxophone Alliance Biennial National Conference 2018, Cincinnati, March 2018.
- Gris sur gris (Hommage à Yves Gaucher). 2012-13. Violin, guitar. Premiere: Duo46 (Beth Ilana Schneider-Gould, violin, Matthew Gould, guitar). 5-Penny New Music Concerts, Sudbury, March 2014.
- Clés. 2012. Miniature suite: 6 pieces for flute, 2 pieces for flutes (2), and 1 piece for flute and piano. Note en Bulle Éditions.
- Redshift/Blueshift. 2012. Baritone saxophone, cello. Note en Bulle Éditions. Premiere: CelloPhone (Nadia Klein, cello, Chelsea Shanof, saxophone). Boats and Balloons, Heliconian Hall, Toronto, September 2014.
- Manu Militari. 2012. Version B. Clarinet in A, flute. Premiere: FL-AIR (Travis Jones, flute, Kip Franklin, clarinet). International Woodwind Duo Symposium, Sam Houston State University, Huntsville, Texas, April 2018.
- Manu Militari. 2011. Alto saxophone, flute. Resolute Music Publications. Premiere: Greenbrook Ensemble. 2014 North American Saxophone Alliance Biennial Conference, University of Illinois, Urbana-Champaigne, March 2014.
- Tie-Break. 2011. Alto saxophone, cello. Premiere: Wallace Halladay, saxophone, Mary-Katherine Finch, cello. Contact Contemporary Music, Gallery 345, Toronto, September 2011.
- Intimate Echoes. 2011. Tenor saxophone, piano. Resolute Music Publications. Premiere: Jeffrey Vickers, saxophone, Hee-Kyung Juhn, piano. Sam Houston State University, Huntsville, Texas, April 2011.
- Deuce. 2010. Alto saxophones (2). Resolute Music Publications. Premiere: Brooke Ferris-Florence, Zachary Pfau, saxophones. Daly Jazz Concert Series, Missoula, Montana, January 2011.
- Infinitas. 2009. Violin, piano.
- Coups d'archet. 2008. Violin. Note en Bulle Éditions. Premiere: Christian Robinson, violin. Music by the Sea Festival Concerts, Bamfield, Vancouver Island, July 2012.
- Clap. 2008. Clarinet. Note en Bulle Éditions. Premiere: Rebecca Danard, clarinet. 2011 International Clarinet Association Conference, California State University, Northridge, August 2011.
- Tanze vor Angst (Hommage à Paul Klee). 2006. Piano. Note en Bulle Éditions. Premiere: Yoko Hirota, piano. Ottawa International Chamber Music Festival, July 2007.
- Ariana, Kaboul. 2005. Alto saxophone. Resolute Music Publications. Premiere: Miguel Romero Moran, saxophone. 14th World Saxophone Congress, Ljubljana, Slovenia, July 2006.
- Stuntman. 2005. Trombone. Premiere: James C. Lebens, trombone. Salle Henri-Gagnon, Université Laval, Quebec City, September 2005.
- Motel Suite. 2004. Version for alto flute, bass clarinet. Premiere: Motion Ensemble. 5-Penny New Music Concert, Sudbury, October 2004.
- Motel Suite. 2004. Version for alto flute, baritone saxophone. Premiere: Duo Zephyr. Salle de l'Atelier du Conservatoire National de Région, Bordeaux, France, March 2005.Tetractys Publishing.
- 6 Ushebtis. 2003. Student pieces (6), piano. Note en Bulle Éditions.
- No Limits. 2003. Tubax (bass saxophone). Premiere: Serge Bertocchi, tubax. Amphithéâtre du Centre de ressources, d'expertise et de performance sportive, Poitou-Charentes, Poitier, France, August 2003.
- Motel Suite. 2002-2003. Soprano saxophone, baritone saxophone. Premiere: Susan Fancher, Mark Engebretson, saxophones. Huntington Concert Series, Sudbury, November 2002.
- Pourtant il y a la nuit. 2002. Violin, cello. Note en Bulle Éditions. Premiere: Christian Robinson, violin, Alexandra Lee, cello. Silver Birch Concert, Sudbury, April 2006.
- Reliefs. 2001. Clarinet. Premiere: Jean-Guy Boisvert, clarinet. Simon Fraser University, Vancouver, January 2002.
- Dial M for...hommage à Alfred Hitchcock. 2000. Soprano saxophone. Premiere: Jean-François Guay, saxophone. 13th World Saxophone Congress, Minneapolis, July 2003.
- 5 Études. 2000. Alto saxophone. Resolute Music Publications. Premiere: Jean-François Guay, saxophone. University of Iowa, Iowa City, March 2001.
- Thèbes. 2000. Version for bassoon. Premiere: Michel Bettez, bassoon. 29th International Double Reed Conference, Buenos Aires, Argentina, August 2000.
- Thèbes. 2000. Baritone saxophone. Premiere: Claude P. Fortier, saxophone. 12th World Saxophone Congress, Montreal, July 2000.
- Kamigluk's Inukshuit. 2000. Flute, marimba. Premiere: Anick Lessard, flute, Mario Boivin, marimba. Musique Chez Nous, Bishop's University, Sherbrooke, Quebec, November 2001.
- Incertitude. 1999. Alto saxophone, piano. Resolute Music Publications. Premiere: Rémi Ménard, saxophone, Marc Joyal, piano. Laval University, Quebec City, March 2000.
- Les photographies du 21. 1999. Alto saxophone. Premiere: Rémi Ménard, saxophone. University of Calgary, February 2000.
- Série B (B Film). 1999. Alto saxophone. Student piece. Resolute Music Publications.
- Tambour battant (Beat the Drum). 1999. Alto saxophone. Student piece. Resolute Music Publications.
- Du bout des lèvre au bout des doigts. 1999. Alto saxophone. Student piece.
- Mitsu no kisetsu. 1998. Version for alto voice, baritone saxophone. Éditions Jobert, Collection Pierre de Lune. Premiere: Annie Tremblay, soprano, André Leroux, saxophone. Chapelle Historique du Bon-Pasteur, Montreal, February 2001.
- Mitsu no kisetsu. 1998. Baritone voice, contrabassoon. Premiere: Paul Rowe, baritone, Monica Fucci, contrabassoon. International Double Reed Society Conference, Madison, Wisconsin, August 1999.
- Hiroshima. 1998. Piano. Éditions Doberman-Ypann. Original title: Hiroshima mon amour. Premiere: Yoko Hirota, piano. In Performance Series, University of Saskatchewan, Saskatoon, February 2002.
- Oran. 1998. Alto saxophone, piano. Resolute Music Publications. Premiere: Jean-François Guay, saxophone, Yoko Hirota, piano. École de musique Vincent-d'Indy, Montreal, November 1999.
- Trou noir. 1996. Baritone saxophone, piano. Premiere: Claude P. Fortier, saxophone, Louise Andrée Baril, piano. Chapelle Historique du bon Pasteur, Montreal, March 2000.
- Solitude oubliée. 1995. Tenor saxophone. Éditions Doberman-Yppan. Premiere: Jean-François Guay, saxophone. Maison de la culture Mont-Royal, Montreal, November 1995.
- Les yeux de la solitude. 1987. Alto saxophone, percussion. Premiere: Daniel Gauthier, saxophone, François Gauthier, percussion. Société des concerts alternatifs du Québec, Montreal, February 1988. North American Composers
- Ullaaq. 1984, revised 2016. Organ.

=== Chamber ensembles ===
- Tuyaux (Hommage à Yi Chul Hee). 2023. Woodwind Quintet and Alto Saxophone. Premiere: Ventus Machina. Centre des arts d'Edmundston. Edmundston, NB. March 4, 2026
- Anthropométrie bleue (hommage à Yves Klein). 2023. Soprano saxophone, bass clarinet, percussion. Premiere: Duo Entre-Nous (Jackie Glazier, bass clarinet, Don-Paul Kahl, saxophone), Morris Palter, percussion. Holsclaw Hall, Arizona State University, February 2024.
- Du simple au double. 2022. Oboe, alto saxophone, B♭ clarinet, bass clarinet, bassoon. Note en Bulle Éditions. Premiere : Woodwork Reed Quintet, Kasteel van Schoten, Schoten, Belgium. November 2022
- À deux contre un. 2020. Flute, alto saxophone, piano.
- Après la pluie. 2019. Violins (2), piano.
- A Short Answer. 2019. Alto saxophone, cello, piano
- Overtime. 2019. Trombones (4).
- Contrepoint...hommage à Robert Altman. 2016. Version C. Flute, soprano saxophone, clarinet, baritone saxophone.
- Contrepoint...hommage à Robert Altman. 2016. Version B. Flute, soprano saxophone, clarinet, bassoon.
- Contrepoint...hommage à Robert Altman. 2016. Version A. Flute, oboe, clarinet, bassoon. Premiere: Iwona Glinka, flute, Gdansk Reed Trio. Kwidzyn Music Spring International Festival, Kwidzyn, Poland, June 2018.
- Slow Swirl at the Edge of the Sea (hommage à Mark Rothko). 2015. Violin, alto saxophone, piano. Note en Bulle Éditions. Premiere: Trio Empreinte. Escales transatlantiques, Paris, October 2015.
- Quelques tranches de temps. 2014. Version B. Flute, soprano saxophone, clarinet. Note en Bulle Éditions. Premiere: International Counterpoint. Cortona Sessions for New Music, Cortona, Tuscany, Italy, July 2017.
- Éole. 2014. Version B. Saxophones (3) (soprano, alto, tenor). Note en Bulle Éditions. Premiere: Elouan Delouche, Tom Tastet, Maelenn Séjourne, saxophones. Auditorium du Conservatoire de Rennes, Rennes, France, November 2022.
- Fragments/Metamorphosis. 2014. Version B. Saxophones (3) (soprano, alto, baritone).
- Chemin du miracle. 2013. Soprano voice, clarinet, violin. Premiere: Motion Ensemble. 5-Penny New Music Concerts, Sudbury, January 2014.
- Urban Influx (Afflux urbain). 2013. Saxophones (4) (soprano, alto, tenor, baritone). Éditions Doberman-Yppan. Premiere: Proteus Quartet. North American Saxophone Alliance Biennial Conference, University of Illinois, Urbana-Champaigne, March 2014.
- Verticales (hommage à Barnett Newman). 2011-12. Saxophones (4) (soprano, alto, tenor, baritone). Resolute Music Publications. Premiere: Anubis Quartet. 5-Penny New Music Concerts, Sudbury, April 2012.
- Concetto Spaziale (hommage à Lucio Fontana). 2011-12. Alto saxophones (3). Resolute Music Publications. Premiere: Echo Rogue Saxophone Trio. 16th World Saxophone Congress, St Andrews, Scotland, July 2012.
- Ligne(s) médiane(s). 2011. Version B. Saxophones (4) (soprano, altos (2), baritone). Premiere: Siam Saxophone Quartet. 16th World Saxophone Congress, St Andrews, Scotland, July 2012.
- Zones d'ombre. 2011. Soprano saxophone, flute, percussion, piano. Premiere: Ensemble Proxima Centauri. Opus 12.3, Les Universaux, Centre culturel Rocher de Palme, Bordeaux, France, May 2012.
- Territoires intérieurs (hommage à Bernard Émond). 2010. String quartet (violins (2), viola, cello), piano. Premiere: Silver Birch String Quartet (Christian Robinson, Geoff McCausland, violins; Jane Russell, viola; Alexandra Lee, cello), Yoko Hirota, piano. Friday Evening at the Rolston, Banff Centre for the Arts, Banff, Alberta, March 2011.
- Trotte-minute, nos. 1-2. 2010. Saxophones (3) (sopranino, alto, bass). Premiere: Anubis Quartet. Nichols Concert Hall, Music Institute of Chicago, Chicago, Illinois, November 2010.
- On Call. 2010. Trumpets (3). Premiere: Ensemble de cuivres. Salle Henri-Gagnon, Laval University, Quebec City, November 2010.
- Ligne(s) médiane(s). 2009. Alto saxophone, clarinet, oboe, bassoon. Premiere: Noise-to-Signal Ensemble. Bowling Green State University, Bryan Recital Hall, Bowling Green, Ohio, March 2017.
- Éole. 2008. Clarinets (3). Note en Bulle Éditions. Premiere: Trio Éole. Auditorium d'Alma, Alma, Quebec, October 2008.
- Gelb, Rot, Blau...hommage à Wassily Kandinsky. 2008. Version C. Soprano saxophone, alto saxophone, piano. Resolute Music Publications. Premiere: Kenneth Tse, soprano saxophone; Jean-Michel Goury, alto saxophone; Su-Yen Chee, piano. 15th World Saxophone Congress, Bangkok, Thailand, July 2009.
- Gelb, Rot, Blau...hommage à Wassily Kandinsky. 2008. Version B. Soprano saxophone, clarinet, piano. Premiere: Jeffrey Price, saxophone; Trevor Pittman, clarinet; Philip Adamson, piano. Windsor Canadian Music Festival 2010, February 2010.
- Gelb, Rot, Blau...hommage à Wassily Kandinsky. 2008. Clarinet, oboe, piano. Premiere: Pauline Farrugia, clarinet; Étienne de Médicis, oboe; Yoko Hirota, piano. 5-Penny New Music Concerts, Sudbury, November 2008.
- Structure/Paysage...hommage à Eli Bornstein. 2008. String quartet (violins (2), viola, cello). Premiere: Molinari String Quartet. Chapelle historique du Bon-Pasteur, Montreal, May 2009.
- (S)AXE(S). 2007. Saxophones (4) (soprano, alto, tenor, tubax). Premiere: Quatuor de saxophones Xasax. Le Petit faucheux, Festival Emergences, Tours, France, November 2008.
- In the dark...hommage à Lars von Trier. 2006. Piano trio (violin, cello, piano). Premiere: Christian Robinson, violin; Alexandra Lee, cello; Yoko Hirota, piano. 5-Penny New Music Concerts, Sudbury, February 2007.
- Fragments/Metamorphosis. 2006. Oboe, clarinet, bassoon. Premiere: Estria Trio. Haskell Free Library and Opera House, Stanstead, Quebec, May 2006.
- Voix parallèles. 2004. Tenor saxophone, trombone and piano. Premiere: Jean-François Guay, saxophone; James C. Lebens, trombone; Hélène Desjardins, piano. Salle Henri-Gagnon. Laval University, Quebec City, March 2005.
- Varius Multiplex Multiformis. 2004. Brass quintet (trumpets (2), French horn, trombone, tuba). Premiere: Quintette de cuivres de l'Université Laval. Église Notre-Dame-de-Jacques-Cartier, Quebec City, November 2006.
- Un ciel variable pour demain. 2003-2004. 8 easy pieces for various saxophone quartets.
- Ombres d'automne et de lune. 2001. 3 saxophones (one performer), flute/piccolo, piano, celesta. Premiere: Quatuor Appollinaire. Auditorium du Conservatoire à Rayonnement Régional, Toulouse, France, January 2002.
- Shadows of Bamian. 2001-02. Saxophones (4) (sopranos (2), tenors (2)). Premiere: Cuarteto de Saxofones Italica. 14th World Saxophone Congress, Ljubljana, Slovenia, July 2006.
- Quelques tranches de temps. 2000-01. Flute, oboe, clarinet. Premiere: Estria Woodwind Quintet. Novavents, Musica Nova. Lennoxville, Quebec, April 2001.
- Débâcle. 1998. Woodwind quintet (flute, oboe, clarinet, French horn, bassoon). Premiere: Estria Woodwind Quintet. Musica Nova, Lennoxville, Quebec, June 1999.
- Sarajevo. 1995. Saxophones (4) (soprano, alto, tenor, baritone). Éditions Doberman-Yppan. Premiere: Quatuor de saxophones Nelligan. Café Sarajevo, Montreal, January 1996.
- La nostalgie du présent. 1994. Brass quintet (trumpets (2), French horn, trombone, tuba). Premiere: Valdosta State University Brass Quintet. Valdosta State University, Valdosta, Georgia, November 1998.
- À tout prendre...hommage à Claude Jutra. 1995. Piano, violin, viola, cello. Premiere: Tricorde de l'Université Laval, Yoko Hirota, piano. Maison de la Culture Frontenac, Montreal, April 1996.
- Vous ne faites que passer, SVP frappez fort. 1992. Saxophones (5). Premiere: Université de Montréal, Montreal, January 1992.
- Triptyque écarlate. 1991. 3 saxophones (1 performer), harp, percussion. Premiere: Daniel Gauthier, saxophone; François Gauthier, percussion; Lucia Cericona, harp. 10th Festival Mondiale del Sassofono, Pesaro, Italy, September 1992.
- Quatuor. 1991. Percussion (4). Premiere: Université de Montréal Percussion Ensemble. Université de Montréal, Montreal, January 1991.
- L'errance...hommage à Wim Wenders. 1990. String quartet (violins (2), viola, cello). Premiere: Quatuor Morency. Société des concerts alternatifs du Québec, Montreal, October 1991.
- Haut lieu de la nuit. 1985, revised 2021. Song cycle on texts of Lucien Francoeur for baritone, piano, and percussion. Premiere: Gaétan Labbé, baritone; Luc Roberge, piano; François Potvin, percussion. Association de musique actuelle de Québec, Salle Henri-Gagnon, Laval University, February 1985.
- Quatuor, no 2. 1985, revised 1994. Vibraphone/marimba, saxophones (4)

=== Chamber ensembles with conductor ===
- Falten und Farben (hommage an Simon Hantaï). 2021. Saxophones (10) (sopranos (2), altos (3), tenors (3), baritones (2)). Note en Bulle Éditions. Premiere: Zürich Saxophone Collective, Lars Mlekusch, director. Zürich Saxfest 2022, Johanneskirche, Zürich, Switzerland, April 2022.
- Jazz...hommage à Henri Matisse. 2015-16. Tenor saxophone (soloist), flute, clarinet, violin, cello, harp. Premiere: Jeremy Brown, saxophone, Wendy Freeman, conductor. The Sonorous Saxophone, Rozsa Centre, Eckhardt-Gramatté Hall, University of Calgary, October 2016.
- Quadrichromie (hommage à Hans Hartung). 2012. Alto saxophone (soloist), saxophone ensemble (sopranos (2), altos (3), tenors (3), baritones (2)) percussion (2). Premiere: Sean Patayanikorn, saxophone; Northwestern Saxophone Ensemble; Frederick Hemke, conductor. Regenstein Recital Hall, Evanston, Illinois, June 2012.
- Temps de passage. 2010. Version C. Alto/soprano saxophone, B♭ clarinet/bass clarinet, flute, saxophones (3) (soprano, tenor, baritone). Premiere: ChagallPAC Ensemble, Dennis Shafer, conductor. Twilight Final Concert, Boston, Massachusetts, March 2011.
- Temps de passage. 2010. Version B. alto/soprano saxophone, B♭ clarinet/bass clarinet, flute, oboe, tenor saxophone, baritone saxophone.
- Metaesquema...hommage à Hélio Oiticica. 2009. Flutes (3), clarinets (3), soprano saxophone, baritone saxophone. Premiere: Ensemble Le Balcon, Maxime Pascal, director. Église St-Merri, Paris, France, May 2010.
- Tentation d'exil. 2007-08. Saxophones (12) (sopranino, sopranos (2), altos (3), tenors (3), baritones (2), bass). Premiere: University of Toronto Saxophone Ensemble, Gregory Oh, director. New Music, New Generation at the Music Gallery, Toronto, March 2011.
- Checkpoints. 2007. Brass ensemble (trumpets (4), horns (2), trombones (2), bass trombone, euphonium, tuba), percussion (2). Premiere: Ensemble de cuivres de l'Université Laval, James C. Lebens, director. Salle Henri-Gagnon, Laval University, Quebec City, December 2007.
- Plans-séquences. 2006. Flute, clarinet, violin, cello, piano, percussion. Premiere: University of Windsor New Music Ensemble, John Morris Russell, conductor. Windsor Canadian Music Festival 2010, February 2010.
- Calligramme. 2004. Saxophones (6) (soprano, altos (2), tenors (2), baritone). Resolute Music Publications. Premiere: Ensemble de saxophones du Conservatoire National à Rayonnement Régional de Boulogne-Billancourt, Jean-Michel Goury, conductor. Maison du Canada, Paris, France, March 2005.
- Temps de passage. 2002. Flute, oboe, B♭ clarinet/bass clarinet, alto/soprano saxophone, horn, bassoon. Premiere: Estria Woodwind Quintet, Jacques Desjardins, conductor. Musica Nova, Sherbrooke, Quebec, March 2003.
- Ogura sanso. 1999. Soprano (voice), flute, clarinet, violin, cello, percussion.
- La soif du mal...hommage à Orson Welles. 1994. Marimba, percussion (4). Premiere: Michael Varner, marimba; University of Texas Percussion Ensemble; Phillip Clements, conductor. Arlington, Texas, February 1998.
- La rédemption...hommage à Martin Scorsese. 1994. Saxophones (4), percussion (2). Premiere: Bowling Green State University Contemporary Music Ensemble, Mikel Kuehn, conductor. Bowling Green, Ohio, November 1999.
- La chambre verte...hommage à François Truffaut. 1992. Flute, oboe, clarinet, bassoon, piano, percussion (2). Premiere: Ensemble Clavivent, Salle Claude-Champagne, Université de Montreal, April 1993.
- Vagues vertiges. 1989. "Spatialized" saxophone quartet, percussion, saxophone ensemble (sopranino, soprano, altos (2), tenors (2), baritone, bass). Premiere: Ensemble International de Saxophones de Bordeaux, Jean-Marie Londeix, conductor. 150 Jahre Saxophon, Dr. Hoch's Conservatorium, Frankfurt am Main, Germany, March 1990.

=== Chamber orchestra ===
- Ici et là. 2013-14. Chamber string orchestra. Premiere: Ensemble Arkéa, Dina Gilbert, conductor. Chapelle historique du Bon-Pasteur, Montreal, April 2018.
- Une distance habitée. 2009. Chamber orchestra (15 instruments). Premiere: New Music Ensemble of the Glenn Gould School, Brian Current, conductor. Mazzoleni Hall, Royal Conservatory of Music, Toronto, December 2009.
- Mare Tranquilitatis III. 2007. Chamber orchestra (14 instruments). Premiere: Luxembourg Sinfonietta, Marcel Wengler, conductor. Centre des Arts Pluriels, Luxembourg, October 2007.
- Cordes, supercordes. 2004/revised 2010. Pipa, chamber string orchestra.
- Mare Tranquilitatis II. 2004. Chamber orchestra (14 instruments).
- Mare Tranquilitatis. 2003. Chamber orchestra (16 instruments).
- Dead and... 2003. Chamber orchestra (16 instruments).
- Feuille d'univers. 1996. Chamber string orchestra. Premiere: Vancouver Symphony Orchestra, Evan Mitchell, conductor. Roundhouse Community Arts and Recreation Centre, Vancouver, April 2008.
- Konzertzimmermusik. 1992. Soprano saxophone, percussion (3), chamber orchestra (18 instruments). Premiere: Marie-Chantal Leclair, soprano saxophone, Marc David, conductor. Université de Montréal Contemporary Music Workshop, Université de Montréal, Montreal, April 1993.

=== Orchestra ===
- Mouvance. 2010-11. Orchestra.
- Et une porte d'ombre se referme. 2008-09. Violin, orchestra. Premiere: Christian Robinson, violin; Sudbury Symphony Orchestra; Victor Sawa, conductor. Sudbury, March 2010.
- Le mirroir d'un moment. 2006-07. Orchestra.
- Apeldoorm, Nederland. 2005-06. Wind ensemble. Premiere: Tokyo Kosei Wind Orchestra, Keiko Kabayashi, conductor. Fumon-Kan Hall, Tokyo, August 2006.
- Oiseau de givre. 2005. Piano, orchestra. Premiere: Yoko Hirota, piano; Sudbury Symphony Orchestra; Victor Sawa, conductor. Sudbury, February 2006.
- Ramallah. 2002. Alto saxophone, wind ensemble. Premiere: Jean-François Guay, saxophone; Ensemble vent et percussion de Québec; René Joly, conductor. Quebec City, November 2002.
- De brises en ressac. 1999, revised 2006. Version for small orchestra. Premiere: Polish Radio Orchestra (Polska Orkiestra Radiowa), Jacka Rogali, conductor. Witold Lutosławski Concert Studio (Polish Radio), Warsaw, June 2006.
- De brises en ressac. 1999. Orchestra.
- Sarajevo II. 1998. Alto saxophone, trumpets, large orchestra. Premiere: Orchestre symphonique de Laval, Louis Lavigeur, conductor. Université du Québec à Montréal, Salle Pierre-Mercure, Montreal, July 2000.
- On the Road. 1993/revised 2009. "Spatialized" orchestra. Premiere: Ricciotti Ensemble, Leon Barendse, conductor. Ricciotti Zommertoernee (13 concerts in the Netherlands, summer 1993).
- La fuite immobile. 1988. Orchestra.

== Selected albums, EPs and audio files ==
The list below is arranged by year of recording, title of the work, album title (if applicable), physical description (i.e., audio disc (CD), EP and audio files (online tracks)), producer, catalogue number, and performer(s). Selections of Lemay's music are also available at streaming and downloading platforms.

- Clés. 2024. EP (9 audio files). Centretracks: CMCCT 12424. Stephen Tam, flute; with Katie Kirkpatrick, flute (tracks 2 and 8) and Yoko Hirota, piano (track 5).
- Mycélium. 2023. EP (7 audio files). Produced independently. Yoko Hirota, piano.
- Lignum et Spiritus. 2023. EP (4 audio files). Centretracks: CMCCT 12323. Contents: Point d’équilibre (Stephen Tam, flute; Yoko Hirota, piano) -- Shared Visions (Anthony Thompson, clarinet; Yoko Hirota, piano) -- Play-off (Ron Cohen Mann, oboe; Yoko Hirota, piano) -- Au coude-à-coude (Kevin Harris, bassoon; Yoko Hirota, piano).
- Soliloques. 2022. EP (7 audio files). Centretracks: CMCCT 12222. Stéphane Sordet, saxophone.
- 5 Études pour saxophone. 2021. EP (5 audio files). Centretracks: CMCCT 621. Jean-François Guay, saxophone.
- Tanze vor Angst (hommage à Paul Klee); 6 Ushebtis. 2009; remastered 2020. On the album: Small is Beautiful: Miniature Piano Pieces for Piano. 1 audio disc (CD). Phoenix Classical: PHC 95252 (2009); Novana Records: NV6294 (2020). Yoko Hirota, piano.
- Pommes. 2019. EP (8 audio files). Centretracks: CMCCT 11218. Ryan Scott, percussion.
- Fragments noirs. 2017. EP (9 audio files). Centretracks: CMCCT 10817. Stereoscope Saxophone Duo.
- Urban Influx. 2015. On the album: ISCM Canadian Section - 2015 Selected Works. 1 audio disc (CD). Canadian League of Composers. Proteus Quartet.
- Deuce. 2015. On the album: Diálogos. 1 audio disc (CD). FonoSax: FonoSax001. Dúo Lisus.
- Oran. 2014. On the album: Metropolis. 1 audio disc (CD). Ravello Records: RR7889. Allen Harrington, saxophone, Laura Loewen, piano.
- L'errance...hommage à Wim Wenders; Structure/Paysage...hommage à Eli Bornstein; Territoires intérieurs (hommage à Bernard Émond). 2013. On the album: L'errance...1 audio disc (CD). Centrediscs: CMCCD 19513. Silver Birch String Quartet. With: Yoko Hirota, piano, for Territoires intérieurs.
- Sarajevo. 2013. On the album: Consonnances modernes. 1 audio disc (CD). Oratorio: ORCD 4116. Quatuor de saxophones Nelligan.
- Hiroshima mon amour. 2013. On the album: Voces Borealis. 1 audio disc (CD). Centrediscs: CMCCD 18713. Yoko Hirota, piano.
- Asubakatchin. 2013. On the album: Umbra Septentrionis. 1 audio disc (CD). Centrediscs: CMCCD 23417. Yoko Hirota, piano.
- Deuce. 2012. On the album: Le Plus Vite Possible. 1 audio disc (CD). Jeffrey E. Vicker/SaxViker Music. Jeffrey Vicker, Dan Gelok, saxophones.
- Fragments/Metamorphosis. 2011. On the album: Land of Living Skies. 1 audio disc (CD). Centrediscs: CMCCD 16811. Members of the Estria Woodwind Quintet.
- Mare tranquilitatis III. 2007. On the album: CD International Composition Prize 2007, World Premiere Recordings. 1 audio disc (CD). Editions LGNM 407. Luxembourg Sinfonietta, Marcel Wengler, conductor.
- Motel Suite (Version B). 2009. On the album: Crack. 1 audio disc (CD). Erol Records: 7037. Duo Zéphyr.
- Débâcle. 2004. On the album: Le Quintette à vents Estria. 2004. 1 audio disc (CD). Atma Classique: ACD2 2357. Estria Woodwind Quintet.
- Vagues vertiges. 2003. On the album: Musique à l'Université Laval, vol. VI. 1 audio disc (CD). Société nouvelle d'enregistrement: SNE 603. Quatuor de Saxophones Nelligan, Serge Laflamme, percussion, Ensemble de Saxophones du Domaine Forget, Jean-Marie Londeix, conductor. Remastered 2021 by the composer as a single (1 audio file).
- 5 Études pour saxophone. 2003. On the album: New School. 1 audio disc (CD). Fidelio (4): FACD009. Jean-François Guay, saxophone.
- Ombres d'automne et de lune. 2002. On the album: Salom Tours, 2000-2001. 1 audio disc (CD). Erol Records: 7030. Quatuor Apollinaire. Remastered and produced independently 2021 as a single (1 audio file).
- Incertitude. 2000. On the album: Nouvelle musique pour saxophone et piano. 1 audio disc (CD). Société nouvelle d'enregistrement: SNE 651. Rémi Ménard, saxophone, Marc Joyal, piano. Remastered and produced independently 2021 as a single (1 audio file).
- La soif du mal...Hommage à Orson Welles. 1997. On the album: Percumania. 1 audio disc (CD). Faculté de musique de l'Université de Montréal: UMMUS-UMM 107. Série Actuelles. Percussion: Daniel Fortin, Jean-Éric Frenette, Johanne Latreille, Julien Grégoire, Mario Venditti; Robert Leroux, conductor.

== Bibliography ==
- Danard, Rebecca J. "Key Sounds: Robert Lemay's 'Clap'." In: Études in Performing Extended Techniques: Twelve Newly-Commissioned Canadian Works for Solo Clarinet, 77-91. DMA diss., University of Cincinnati, College-Conservatory of Music, 2011.
- Durst, Aaron M. A Descriptive Catalog of the Saxophone Compositions of Robert Lemay. DMA diss., University of Georgia, 2008.
- Guay, Jean-François. "Robert Lemay, Four Pedagogical Pieces for Alto Saxophone." Saxophone Symposium 25 (2000): 71-72.
- Lemay, Robert. "Forme et mouvement dans Solitude oubliée et Sarajevo." Actes de la Journée Sciences et Savoirs 12 (2006): 9–13.
- Mahaffey, Matthew Ray. A Performance Guide to Robert Lemay's Ariana, Kaboul for Alto Saxophone and Film. DMA diss., University of Iowa, 2018.
