= Harold LeMay =

American businessman and automobile collector (1919–2000)

- Born: September 4, 1919; Yakima, Washington, U.S.
- Died: November 4, 2000 (aged 81); Lakewood, Washington, U.S.
- Occupation: Businessman
- Known for: Car collecting
- Spouse: Nancy LeMay
- Children: 8

Harold E. LeMay (September 4, 1919 – November 4, 2000) was the owner of Harold LeMay Enterprises, a refuse company in the Tacoma, Washington metro area. He was the owner of one of the largest private automobile collections in the world at the time of his death.

== Biography ==
LeMay was born in Yakima, Washington, in 1919. He became a partner in an automotive business just out of high school, and began his Spanaway Garbage Collection Company, which would become Harold LeMay Enterprises, just after World War II. Harold also owned Lucky Towing, HELM Trucking, Lucky Sales & Services, and other companies.

LeMay amassed the largest privately owned collection of automobiles, motorcycles, trucks, and all manner of other vehicles and related memorabilia in the world. At its peak, the LeMay Collection numbered in excess of 3,000 vehicles and thousands of "automobilia" artifacts. The Collection, recognized by many as a national treasure, represents the American experience with the automobile as it spans the 20th century and features virtually every American make, as well as numerous foreign cars.

Currently, the bulk of the LeMay Collection is still housed on property owned by the LeMay family. Many of the vehicles have been donated to LeMay - America's Car Museum in Tacoma in order to be accessible to the public; others are still owned by the LeMay Family and are on display at the LeMay Family Collection Foundation at Marymount.

The LeMay Collection was listed in the Guinness Book of World Records in 1997 as the largest privately owned car collection in the world.

Each summer until his death in 2000, LeMay, his wife Nancy, and their family would open their estate for the annual LeMay Car Show. This tradition has continued each summer on the last Saturday in August when thousands of visitors have the opportunity to view this vast collection. He died on November 4, 2000, at St. Clare Hospital in Lakewood, Washington. LeMay had eight children with his wife Nancy.

== Legacy ==
LeMay didn't want his collection broken up and sold off after his death, as happens to many car collections. In 1996, he began talking about opening a non-profit museum that would allow the public to see his collection and keep it all together. He died before this dream could be realized, but his family remembered, and the LeMay - America's Car Museum and, later, The LeMay Family Collection were born.

Hundreds of LeMay's cars are displayed at The LeMay Family Collection Foundation at Marymount, which opened in 1991 in Tacoma on the site of a former military academy-style school for boys, which had been founded by Dominican nuns in the early 1900s. This historic 80-acre site is just as appealing as the vast car and memorabilia exhibit. Hundreds of Harold LeMay's cars are also displayed at LeMay - America's Car Museum in Tacoma, which opened in June 2012, immediately west of the Tacoma Dome.

LeMay's wife, Nancy, and son, Doug, are both active members of the Tacoma community. They also share his passion for car collecting, and have continued it after his death.

=== Awards ===
Harold LeMay was elected to the National Solid Waste Association Hall of Fame in 1991.

On May 28, 2011, Harold and Nancy Lemay were inducted into the Washington State Hot Rod Hall of Fame. Harold's son, Doug Lemay, accepted the award on Harold's behalf.

=== Other Honors ===
The Harold E. LeMay Skateboard Park was opened on October 29, 2005.
