= Marymount Military Academy =

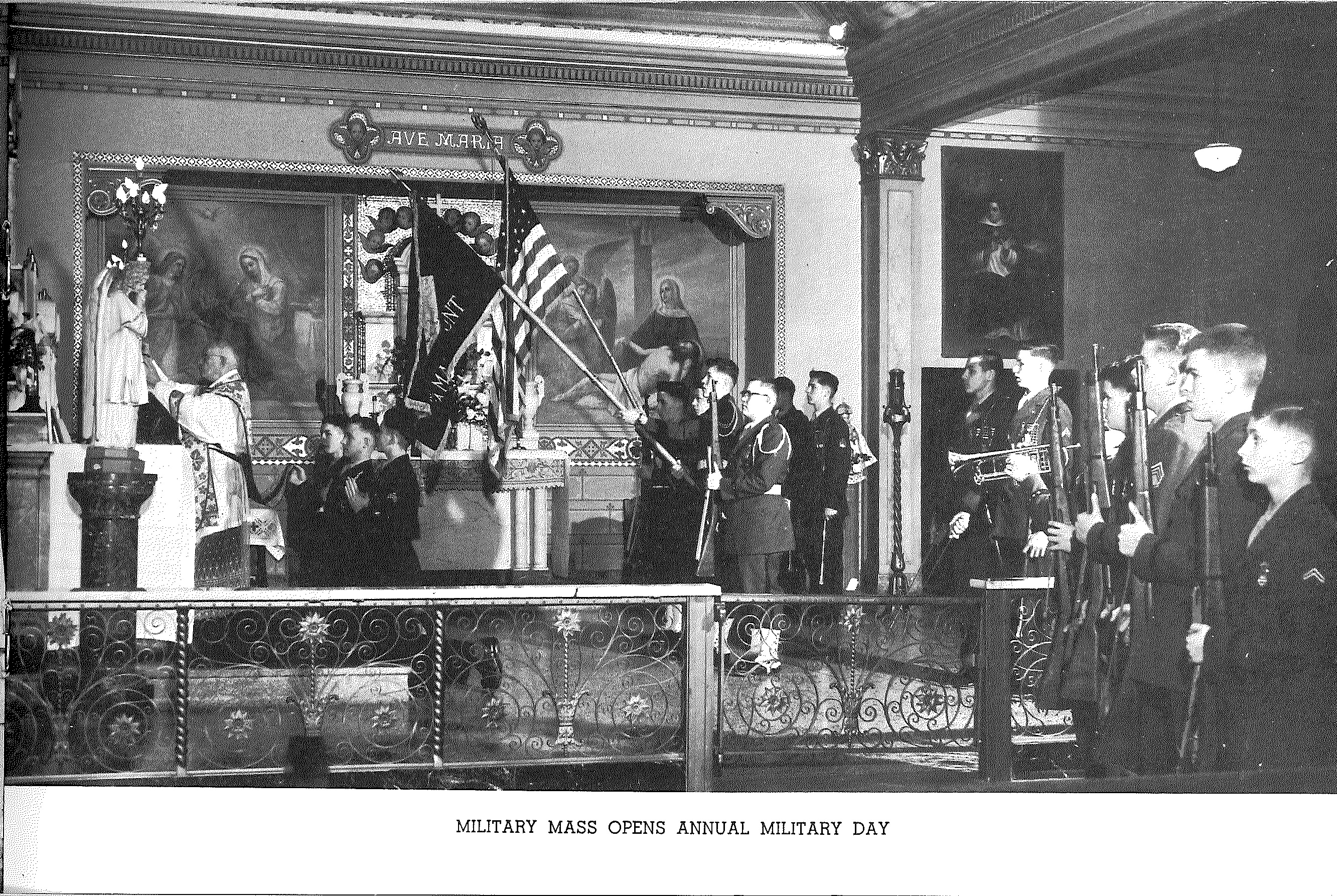
Boys at Mass before Military Day. Taken at historic Marymount Academy in Tacoma, WA.

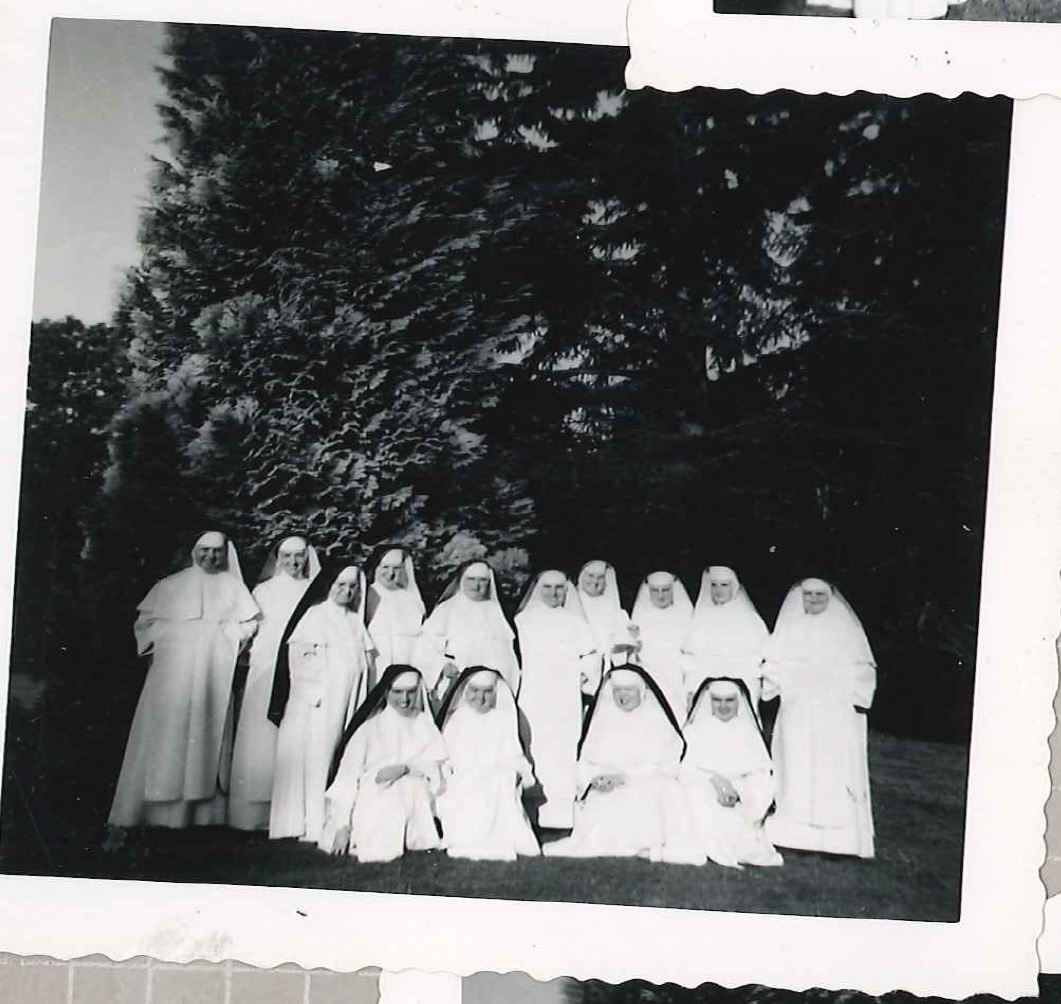
A historic picture of Dominican nuns taken at Marymount in Tacoma, WA.

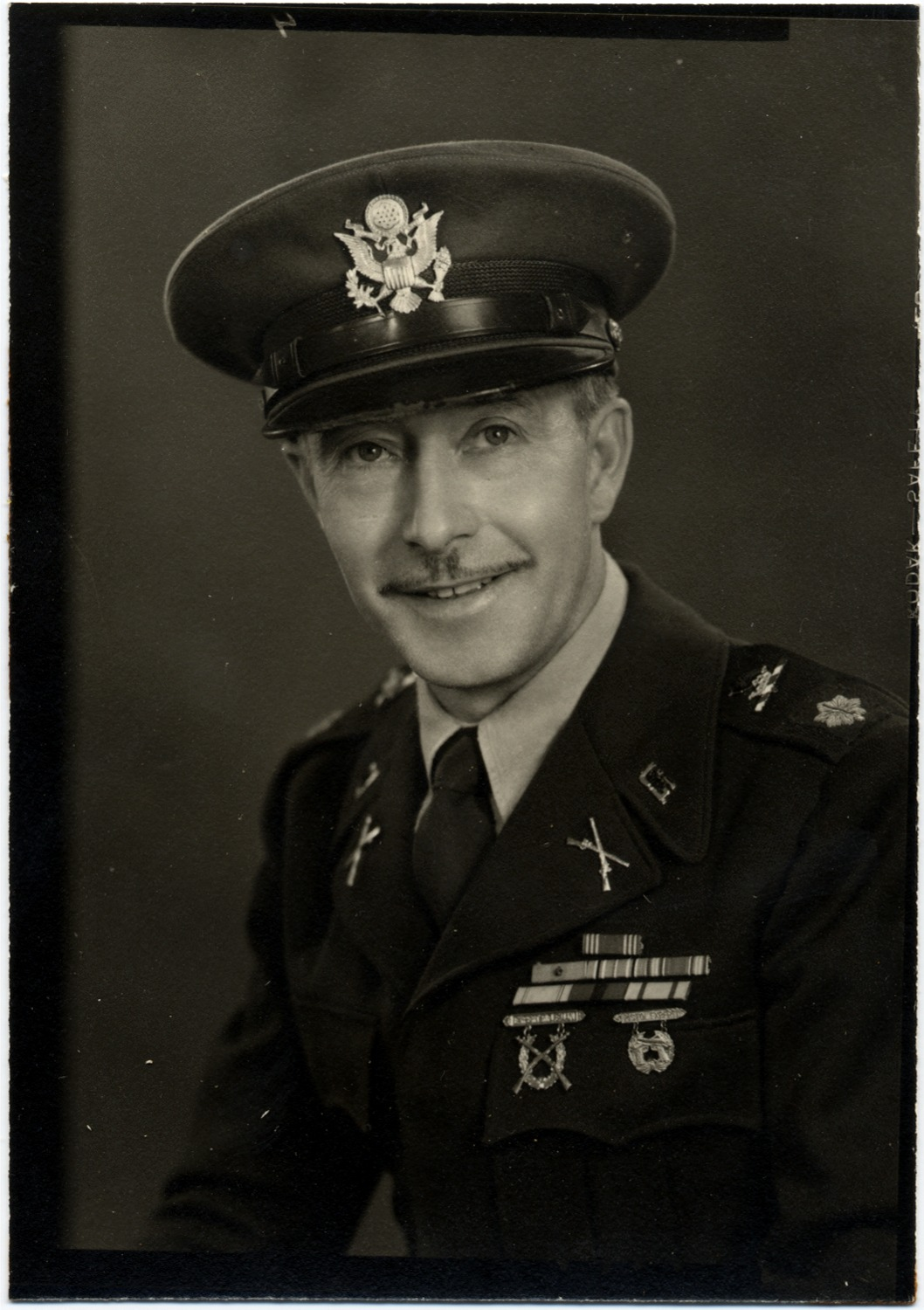
John Gress, Marymount Military Academy Commandant, 1950's. From personal collection, Scott Gress.

Marymount Military Academy was a boys' military school in Tacoma, Washington that was in operation first as a military academy, then as a private boys' school from 1923 to 1976.

== History ==
Marymount was purchased in 1919 by the Sisters of St. Dominic on the outskirts of Tacoma (known as the Tacoma Dominicans), Washington in present-day Parkland. The remote plot on which it stands was bought from the Shields family in 1920. The property was known as "Wright's Acre Tracts", owned by the people who built Annie Wright School. The Shields' property was located on the John Mahon Road, now known as Military Road. The inadequacy of the boys' school (St. Edward's) necessitated the building of the present Marymount Academy in 1922. At that time, Parkland was mostly prairieland. What is now Marymount was then a farmhouse, some outbuildings and rolling fields. The original two administrators of Marymount, Mother Mary Thomasina and Mother Mary de Chantal, chose the present location as a site for a school for boys, to replace Saint Edward's Hall in Tacoma.

The groundbreaking was in May 1921. On July 2, 1922 the cornerstone was laid and it was dedicated as St. Edward's Boys' school at Mary Mount on May 30, 1923. Later the name was shortened to just Marymount. Thus began Marymount's 54 years as a military academy for boys. The school originally catered to pre-schoolers through ninth grade, and the students boarded in what is now the E-shaped building's west wing. A field house was added in 1952. The school is an outgrowth of St. Edward's hall, a pioneer Tacoma educational institution which was also opened and operated by the Dominican Sisters. The administration of the school and direction of the educational program were in the hands of the Dominican Sisters, whose Motherhouse was annexed to the academy.

Curriculum:

A 1940 Tacoma News Tribune article quoting the Dominican Sisters described the educational facilities and policies of the school as follows:

"The student body is composed of boys from six to sixteen years of age. A very high scholastic standard is maintained in all studies. The curricula includes the elementary grades and junior high school studies required for accreditation by the state. The academy is also a charter member of the National Rifle Association. Manual training is provided for the boys and a well organized industrial arts department maintained. Private instruction in music is a part of the daily schedule."

Early Enrollment and Curriculum:

When the school opened there were about 30 boys in attendance. The number fluctuated over the years. During World War II the number of students rose to 110. The students enjoyed a fine music program, and in addition to their choir, Marymount sponsored a band. Once a week the boys held a parade review, demonstrating the marches and drills that they had mastered that week. They also had a tradition of performing annually in the local Daffodil Parade, held in April in downtown Tacoma. A full schedule kept the boys active from reveille at 6:40am each morning until their bedtime at 9:00pm.

Decline:

Marymount was run as a military school until 1971; and five years thereafter as a private boys' boarding school. The academy eventually became economically infeasible. In 1974, the building underwent a vigorous renovation it became a boarding school catering to the wealthy. For example, students from the Mexican elite came to learn English. By 1976, even the boarding school had become too expensive to maintain.

The following decade, Marymount was for all intents and purposes a retirement home and convalescent center for the nuns. By the late 1980s, a series of catastrophic maintenance problems convinced the sisters to sell Marymount because they could not adequately care for the facility and grounds. When the nuns solicited proposals from potential buyers, Harold LeMay’s proposal was not only the lone bid that would preserve the buildings and grounds, but he promised to maintain and improve them. The decisive element of the proposal was that the nuns were promised access to Marymount as long as they wished.

Today, several non-profit groups share space at Marymount, including a senior center, in addition to the LeMay Family Collection Foundation. It is also one of the locations for the annual LeMay Car Show and auction held on the last Saturday of August.

At one time, the Dominican sisters of Marymount operated four schools in the Tacoma area: Marymount and Aquinas Academy, a girls' school, St. Patrick's school and Holy Cross School. On September 21, 1942, they also purchased Haddaway Hall (the former J.P. Weyerhaeuser home) and opened Tacoma Catholic College, a junior college for girls. In 1974, Aquinas Academy, one of three Catholic high schools in the Tacoma area at the time, and St. Leo's, combined with Bellarmine Academy which was operated by the Jesuits.
