= South Africans =

People of South Africa

Total population
- ~63 million in total (~62 million residing in South Africa (2022 South African census information) and 915,000 (2020 UN diaspora estimate)

Regions with significant populations
- South Africa: ~62,000,000 (2022)
- United Kingdom: >217,180 (2021)
- Australia: 189,207 (2021)
- United States: 123,461 (2021)
- United Arab Emirates: ~100,000 (2014)
- New Zealand: 71,382 (2018)
- Canada: 51,590 (2021)
- Netherlands: 41,300 (2023)
- Israel: 22,315 (2021)
- Mauritius: 10,000 (2024)

Languages
- South African English, Afrikaans, Zulu, Xhosa, Languages of South Africa

Religion
- Christianity (68%), Islam (2%), Hinduism (1.5%) and indigenous beliefs (28.5%)

South Africans are the citizens of South Africa.

These individuals include those residing within the borders of South Africa, as well as the South African diaspora.

== History ==
The first modern inhabitants of South Africa were the San peoples and the Khoekhoe peoples.

== Demographic Changes ==
According to the 2022 Statistics South Africa census data, the population of South Africa increased from 51,7 million in 2011 to more than 62 million in 2022, constituting a growth rate of 1,8% in the intercensal period.

The number of households increased from 14.4 million in the 2011 census to 17.8 million in the 2022 census, which is an intercensal growth rate of 2%. The household size declined from 3.6 in 2011 to 3.5 in 2022.

In terms of sex, according to the same census data, in 2022, females constituted 51.5% of the total population (~31.94 million people), while 48.5% were males (~30.07 million people).

Also, Census 2022 stated that there were more than 2.4 million international migrants residing in South Africa, which equated to just above 3% of the total population in South Africa. Most of these individuals - 86% - came from the Southern African Development Community (SADC) region.

Gauteng was the province with the largest population in 2022, comprising 24.3% of the total population in South Africa, followed by KwaZulu-Natal (comprising 20%), and then the Western Cape (comprising 12%); the same order of population size as was the case in Census 2011. All three provinces recorded population growth between Census 2011 and Census 2022.

With the categories combined, in 2022, a total of 3.1% of the South African population reported being either agnostic, atheist, or having, "no religious affiliation".

== South African Citizenship ==
Individuals born in South Africa from and including 6 October 1995 onwards, to at least one parent who, at the time of the individual's birth, held either South African citizenship or South African permanent residency, are automatically South African citizens by birth, according to the South African Citizenship Act, 1995 (Act 88 of 1995).

It is also possible to become a South African citizen by descent. An individual born outside South Africa, to at least one parent who, at the time of the individual's birth, held South African citizenship, may obtain South African citizenship by descent. The individual's birth must be registered in South Africa for them to acquire that status.

Furthermore, it is possible to obtain South African citizenship by being adopted by a South African citizen.

Finally, it is possible to become a South African citizen by naturalization, whereby foreigners wishing to obtain that status may apply for such, if they meet certain eligibility criteria.

== See also ==
- South Africa
- Provinces of South Africa
- Geography of South Africa
- Government of South Africa
- Constitution of South Africa
- Politics of South Africa
- Statistics South Africa
- List of South Africans
