= Zimbabwean diaspora =

Emigrants from Zimbabwe and their descendants

Total population
- c. 16–22 million worldwide

Regions with significant populations
- Zimbabwe 13,061,239 (2012)
- South Africa: 1,000,000– 3,000,000
- United Kingdom: 128,000
- Australia: 65,000
- Botswana: 50,000
- United States: 30,000–50,000 (estimate)
- Canada: 31,225
- Zambia: 10,000
- France: 8,372
- New Zealand: 5,600
- Ireland: 5,348
- Germany: 3,715
- Portugal: 1,312
- Namibia: 1,160
- Singapore: 1,103
- Hong Kong: 859
- Brazil: 412

Languages
- Zimbabwean English • Shona • Ndebele

Religion
- Methodism • Roman Catholicism • Anglicanism • Pentecostalism • Judaism.

The Zimbabwean diaspora refers to the diaspora of immigrants from the nation of Zimbabwe and their descendants who now reside in other countries. The number of Zimbabweans living outside Zimbabwe varies significantly from 4 to 7 million people, though it is generally accepted at over 5 million people, some 30 per cent of all Zimbabweans. Varying degrees of assimilation and a high degree of interethnic marriages in the Zimbabwean diaspora communities makes determining exact figures difficult. The diaspora population is extremely diverse and consists of Shona people, Ndebele, white Zimbabweans, mixed-race people, Asians, Jewish people and other minority groups. The diaspora traces their origin to several waves of emigration, starting with the exodus that followed the 1965, unilateral declaration of independence in Rhodesia, but significantly since the sociopolitical crisis that began in 2000.

Countries with the biggest diaspora populations include South Africa, the United Kingdom, Australia, Canada, New Zealand and the United States. There is mobility within the diaspora. For example, some Zimbabweans have moved to the UK before deciding to settle in Australia.

== History ==
Historically, Zimbabwe has long been a destination for immigration, rather than a source of immigrants, with large waves of migration occurring from Africa, Europe led by the United Kingdom as well as other minorities notably from British India from the late 19th century onwards. After the discovery of gold at Witwatersrand, temporary labour migration to South Africa increasingly became a feature of Rhodesian and then Zimbabwean society. A 2002 survey by the Southern African Migration Project show that almost 25% of adult Zimbabweans' parents or grandparents had worked in South Africa at some point in their lives.

However, permanent emigration is a relatively new phenomenon. There have been two major waves of emigration from Zimbabwe. The first was that of whites in Zimbabwe who left the country soon after independence; they were followed by black Zimbabweans beginning in the 1990s. In both cases, South Africa was again their primary destination; however, from 1994 onwards, the South African government displayed increasing hostility to skilled immigration from the rest of Africa, leading Zimbabwean emigrants to move to the UK and beyond.

In contrast, wealthier Zimbabweans tend to have an easier route to the UK, with many having family or ancestral ties to the country, while others are able to arrive as skilled professionals, investors or students, making the community wealthier than arrivals from other countries in Africa and more comparable to South African or Australian Britons. Prior to November 2002, Zimbabweans were free to travel to the UK without a visa and this provided them with easy access to the country. Since the UK Government introduced the requirement for Zimbabweans to apply for visas to travel to the UK, increasing numbers of those who can have chosen other countries such as Australia and Canada as attractive destinations. Additionally as the number of Zimbabweans applying for asylum to the UK has fallen, increasing numbers of working class Zimbabweans have sought refuge in South Africa instead, while those in the UK, increasingly skew wealthier.

== Overall statistics ==
It is estimated that there are millions of residents outside of Zimbabwe's borders who were either born in the country or are descended from immigrants. Permanent emigration is a relatively recent phenomenon having begun in the 1990s but expanded significantly since 2000. Much of the country's middle class has chosen to emigrate due to poor political and economic conditions at home, especially during the political violence that marred the 2000s, essentially foot voting. Zimbabwe's high literacy and skilled immigrants by African standards, has made them highly attractive, for example in the United Kingdom, where many medical professionals have been recruited directly by the NHS. Additionally, a steep decline in funding for once prestigious institutions such as the University of Zimbabwe and the National University of Science and Technology, Zimbabwe has pushed many students abroad particularly to Australia, Canada and South Africa to complete their university studies. However, refugees and less skilled migrants tend to reside legally or illegally in nearby South Africa, due to the fall of the standard of living and economic conditions in Zimbabwe.

The Zimbabwean diaspora has a 95% literacy rate and a highly skilled adult population. The main languages spoken are English, Shona, and Ndebele.

== Context ==
In December 2017 the website Zimbabwe News and Gettysburg College, calculated the cost of the Mugabe era using various statistics, noting that at during the 1980s, the country was growing economically at about seven per cent a year, and had done so since independence. If this rate of growth had been maintained for the next 40 years, Zimbabwe would have in 2019 a GDP of US$102 billion making it an upper middle income economy or newly industrialised country. Instead it had a formal sector GDP of only US$24 billion, a loss of tens of billions in lost growth.

The population growth in 1980 was among the highest in Africa at about 3.5 per cent per annum, doubling every 21 years thanks to high birth rates, relatively low death rates and modest immigration. Had this growth been maintained, the population would have been 31 million. Instead, as of 2018, it is about 13 million. The discrepancies were believed to be caused widespread emigration as well as premature deaths from political violence, starvation and disease, and partly due to a notable fertility decline. The life expectancy fell during the 2000s, and death from politically motivated violence sponsored by government exceeds 200,000 since 1980. The policies of the Mugabe government have directly or indirectly caused the premature deaths of an estimated three million Zimbabweans in 37 years.

== By country ==
=== Australia ===
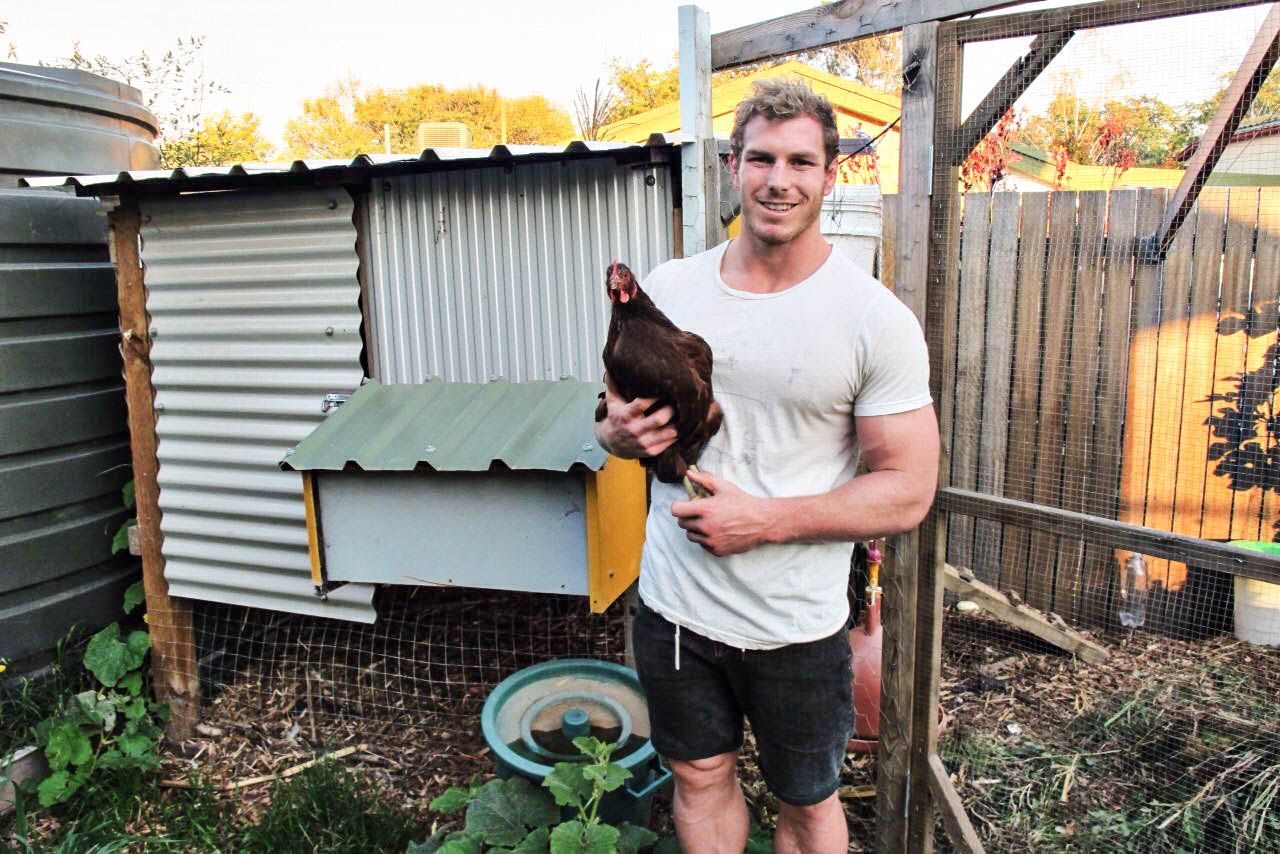
Zimbabwean Australian rugby player, David Pocock

Zimbabweans form a significant community in Australia with their numbers having grown to over 34,787 Zimbabwe-born as of 2018. When including their Australian and foreign born members, the government estimates at least 60,000 people being equally divided between black and white Zimbabweans The community is now well established, with some of the highest incomes in the country, as well as with community institutions such as Zimbabwean language schools. One in three of Australia's Shona and Ndebele-speakers live in Sydney with other concentrations of Zimbabweans in Perth, Melbourne and Queensland. Indeed, some 78 per cent of Zimbabwean Aussie adults hold a tertiary degree, making them the best educated group in the country

=== Botswana ===
There are estimated to be between 40,000 and 100,000 Zimbabweans in Botswana as of 2009. Zimbabweans are the most numerous nationality among registered foreign workers in Botswana. More than half of Zimbabwean migrant workers are employed in agricultural and mining occupations, while others work in construction, real estate, finance, retail, education, health and manufacturing. As a result, a disproportionate number of Zimbabweans form part of Botswanas skilled workers, boosting the country's economy at the expense of Zimbabwe itself. Others, especially the more- irregular migrants, are engaged as maids, herders or in cross-border trading.

=== Canada ===
According to the 2016 census, there were 30,035 Canadians with Zimbabwean background, 15,650 of whom were born in Zimbabwe. Canada became an important destination for Zimbabweans as early as 1965, but especially so since 2000. Being anglophone and relatively well educated, they've readily adapted to Canadian society. The Zimbabwean community in Canada is concentrated in Toronto; Calgary; Edmonton; Southern Ontario, Ottawa, Montreal, Vancouver and Victoria, British Columbia in British Columbia. Their numbers have been slowly but steadily increasing since 2000.

=== Ireland ===
In the Republic of Ireland, there were approximately 5,348 Irish Zimbabweans, third among African countries behind Nigeria and South Africa. A minority of these may have ties to Ireland through family ancestry. Approximately 310 people, gained Irish citizenship between the censuses of 2011 and 2016. Due to proximity and historical ties, there is quite a lot of movement between people settled in Ireland and those in the UK.

=== New Zealand ===
Zimbabwean New Zealanders or Zimbabwean Kiwis are New Zealand citizens who are fully or partially of Zimbabwean descent or Zimbabwe-born people who reside in New Zealand. They include migrants to New Zealand of people from Zimbabwe, as well as their descendants. Today, over 5,614 people in New Zealand have Zimbabwean ancestry in 2016, making them one of the diaspora's smaller communities. New Zealand's Zimbabwean population is the biggest in Auckland. Many Zimbabwean New Zealanders are of White Zimbabwean origin, with a soon to be plurality of Shona people. Zimbabwean Kiwis are overwhelmingly concentrated on the North Island, particularly Wellington, Auckland and Hamilton.

=== South Africa ===
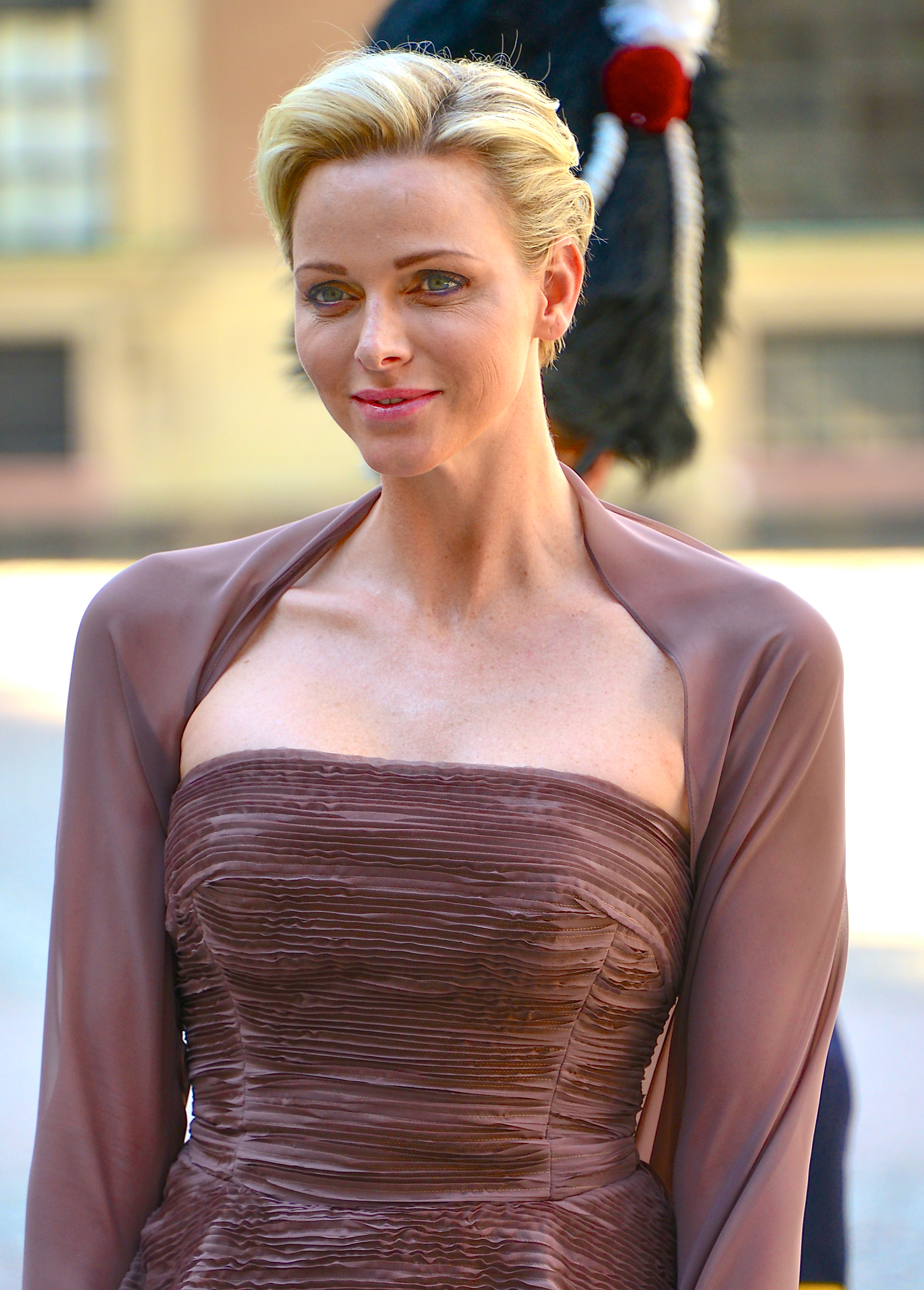
Charlene, Princess of Monaco was born in Rhodesia and raised there and in South Africa

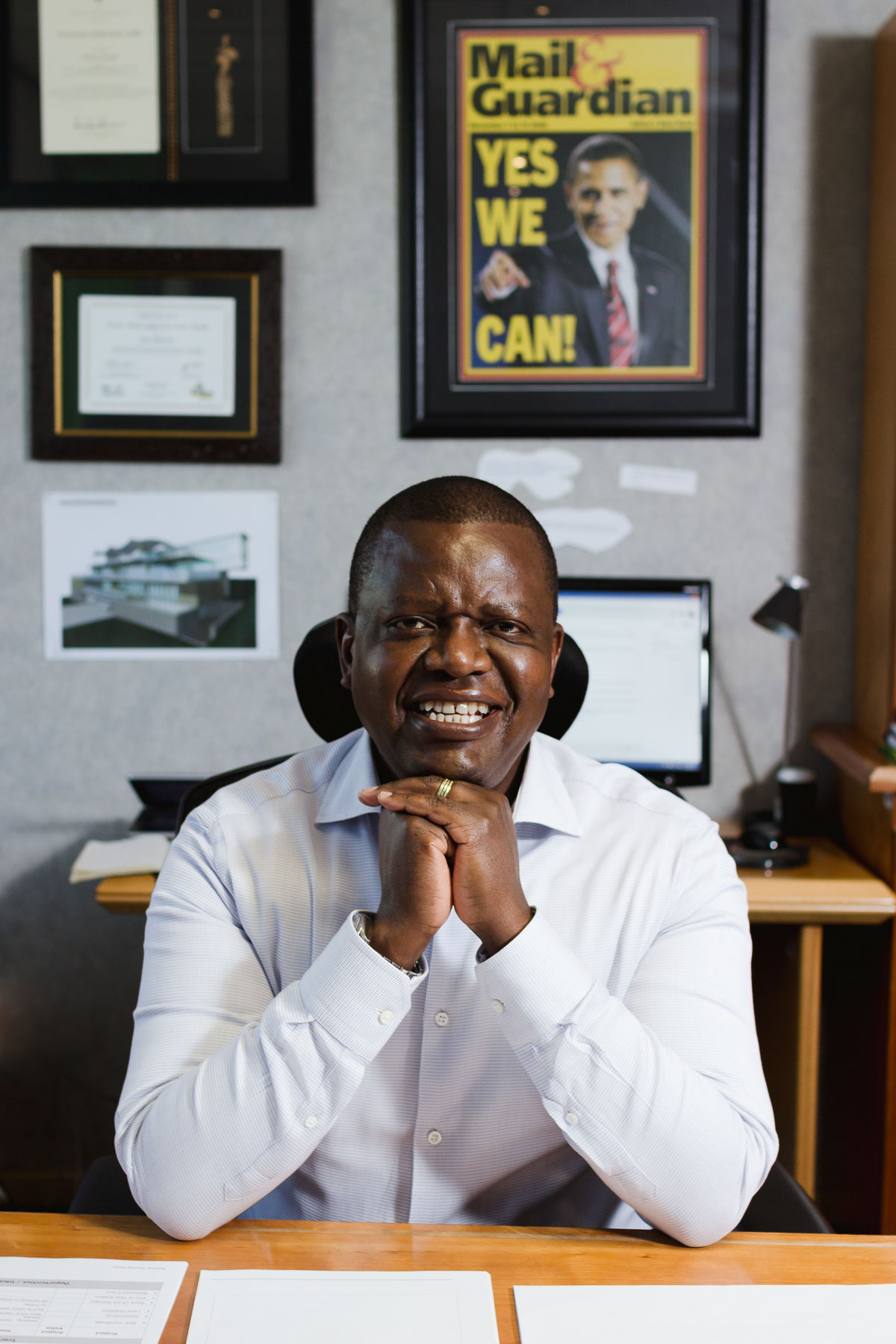
Trevor Ncube, 2017

There are estimated to be between eight hundred thousand and three million Zimbabweans in South Africa as of 2018. Migration between the two countries has been a feature throughout the 20th century, traditionally with mostly white South Africans moving north and black Zimbabwean workers temporarily heading south. Beginning in the 1980s, the tide began to turn in favor of South Africa and with large scale emigration a feature since 2000. Today, Zimbabweans in South Africa have faced a tougher time there than in other countries, with many working class and poorer migrants facing xenophobic violence and crime in the country. Additionally, while it is easier to settle in South Africa than in previous years, the government still makes naturalising as a South African citizen very difficult.

Ironically, The Zimbabwean immigrant is the most similar to native South Africans of all major foreign immigrants in the country, and they easily adapt to their new place of residence, due to similarities in environment, culture, lifestyle, language and their relatively higher education levels. Indeed, most immigrants that arrived prior to Zimbabwe's economic crisis in the 2000s, would often assimilate readily in South African society.

Zimbabwean immigration has accompanied the ups and downs suffered by the country in recent decades in terms of political and economic instability.

However, Zimbabweans still face significant challenges in South Africa, with working class and poorer migrants disproportionately suffering from discrimination and xenophobic violence. Indeed, the most vulnerable of migrants tend to suffer from wage exploitation and anti-migrant violence, with female migrants facing the additional risk of rape and sexual exploitation. As a result, many Zimbabweans have soured on South Africa, frustrated with the governments poor handling of crime and xenophobia, as well as its indifference to the plight of Zimbabwe and Zimbabweans. Most educated workers who can afford to, now believe it is better to emigrate to other countries such as the United Kingdom; Australia; Canada; New Zealand and Ireland, which offer greater economic opportunities, less discrimination and crime than remain in South Africa.

Despite this, numerous academics, students, athletes, journalists, artists and professionals stand out within the Zimbabwean community in South Africa.

=== United Kingdom ===
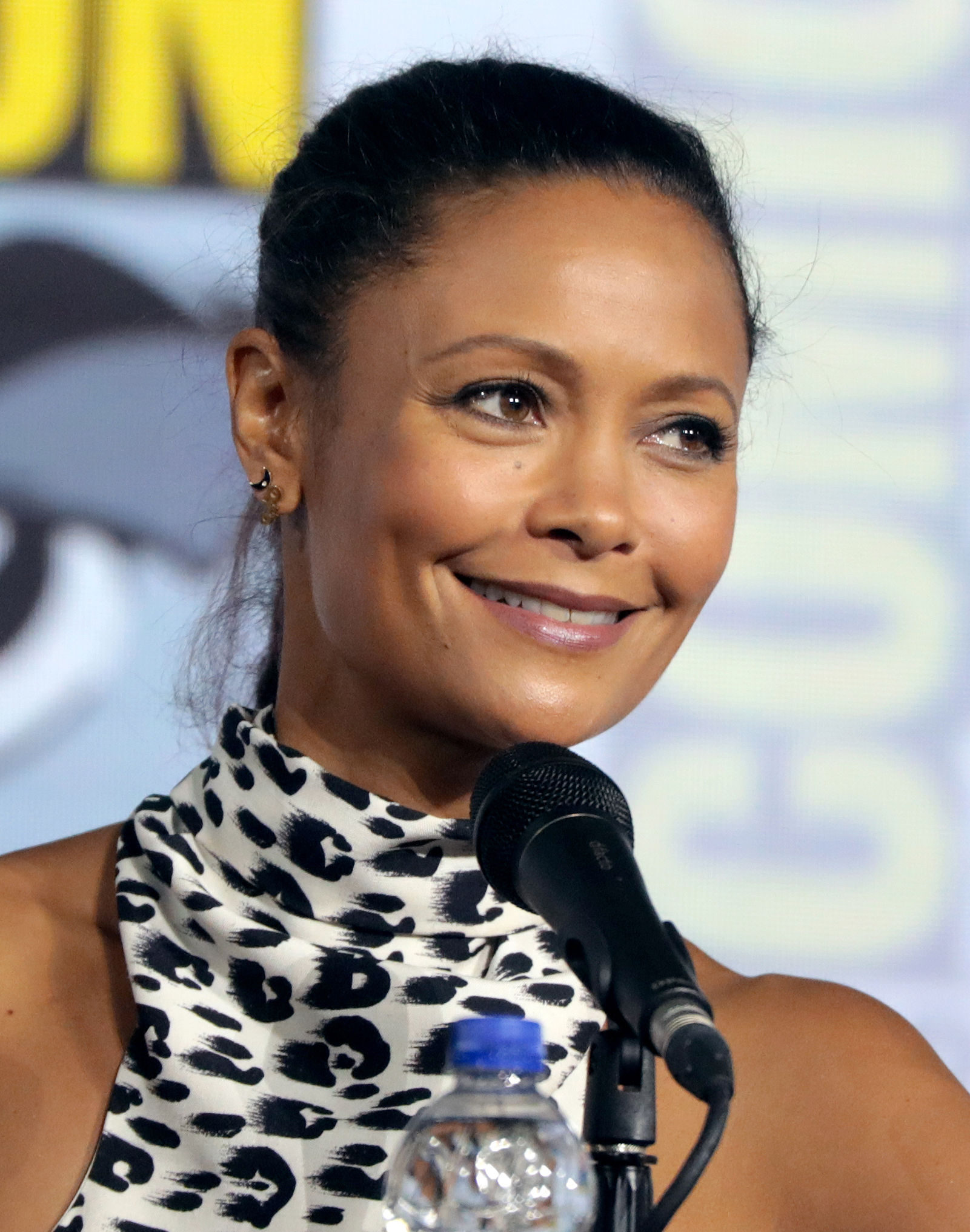
Thandiwe Newton is an English actress of Zimbabwean ancestry

Zimbabwean Britons are British people of Zimbabwean descent. There are approximately 500,000 Britons of Zimbabwean origin or descent. Most live in the Greater London/South East England, Leicester and Yorkshire. London has the largest population of people of Zimbabwean descent in the United Kingdom. Other notable areas with Zimbabweans include Leicester, Leeds, Sheffield, Berkshire, and Bedfordshire, Cambridgeshire, Milton Keynes and Birmingham.

Zimbabwean immigrants and their children tend to adapt quickly to British society due to the long ties between the two countries, their all but identical education systems and high levels of education and English fluency compared to most immigrants to the UK. In addition many Zimbabweans have family or ancestral ties to the UK or have studied and spent time there, making it easier for them to settle in Britain than other immigrants. Indeed, many professionals, particularly those in the medical field, were directly recruited by British employers to the UK, beginning in the 1990s.

Studies have pointed to the higher rate of English use among Zimbabweans, their willingness to marry non-Zimbabweans, and their eagerness to become naturalised citizens as factors that contribute to their rapid assimilation, as well as their interactions with the greater British-born community. In addition, Zimbabwe has historically been a melting pot of many cultures and languages, making assimilating to a multicultural Britain easier. A minority of Zimbabweans on the other hand, particularly those who arrived as asylum seekers or with less resources, tended to struggle upon arriving in the UK and would find themselves overrepresented in high demand but less prestigious sectors such as nursing, elder and childcare.

=== United States ===
Zimbabwean Americans are Americans of Zimbabwean ancestry or birth. The American Community Survey of 2017 estimated the Zimbabwean American population to number 30,000, a figure that notably increased from a decade earlier. Similar to neighbouring South Africa, Zimbabwe was traditionally a destination of immigrants from Europe and Africa beginning in the late 19th century and lasting until the mid to late 20th century. As a result, few Zimbabweans lived in the US prior to the late 1970s, with most preferring South Africa, the UK and Australia instead.

There are various conflicting figures on the exact number of Zimbabweans in the US. The RAND Corporation estimated in 2000 that there were 100,000 in the state of New York alone. In contrast, a 2008 estimate from the Association of Zimbabweans Based Abroad put the population of Zimbabweans in the whole US at just 45,000. They make up just a small part of the Zimbabwean diaspora compared to the larger communities in South Africa and the United Kingdom. Many Zimbabweans who emigrate, particularly those with British, Malawian, Portuguese, Greek, and Mozambiquean ancestry hold or are eligible for dual citizenship, which makes determining their exact numbers difficult. Despite this, the vast majority of Zimbabweans identify both with their nationality and country of origin.

The history of Zimbabwean emigration to the United States is very recent. Before 1980, the few Zimbabweans that left the country migrated to either the United Kingdom or South Africa. The emergence of serious economic and political problems beginning in the 1990s, led to a significant wave of emigration, which included large numbers of well-educated professionals, particularly in the medical field and students who began to seek out the US as an alternative destination.

Most Zimbabweans find it relatively easy to adapt to life in large cities in the United States, thanks to their English usage, cosmopolitan lifestyle and a multicultural society that makes it easier to adapt to American life. In addition, the high value that is given to higher education has led many Zimbabwean students to migrate to the United States to continue their university studies there. Most Zimbabweans established themselves in New York City, the Washington, D.C., area, Southern California and Texas. Other notable centers of the Zimbabwean American population are New Jersey; Greater Philadelphia; the Bay Area; Atlanta; Massachusetts and Indiana. Sharing a similar history, culture and lifestyle, many Zimbabweans and South Africans have formed close bonds in the US and tend to live in similar communities with many forming associations and sharing family ties. Indeed, South Africans and Zimbabweans are among the most skilled and professionally employed immigrants in the US today, with nearly 60 per cent of them holding a bachelor's degree or higher based on a 2005 study. Despite this there are evident economic disparities between long settled citizens and recent arrivals with few ties to North America.

=== Other locations ===
More recently, a small but educated class of Zimbabweans, particularly those in finance, hospitality and international trade have been emigrating toward cities such as Singapore, Hong Kong, Dubai and, to a lesser extent, Japan and, Malaysia. Joining them are a small number of students seeking a cheaper alternative to Western universities as well as ZANU-PF officials with properties in the region. Few have plans to settle long term and lead a lifestyle that resembles that of western expats more than it does other migrants. The nation continues to experience high emigration and a significant disparity in income between wealthier emigrants concentrated in the West and Zimbabweans at home or in South Africa.

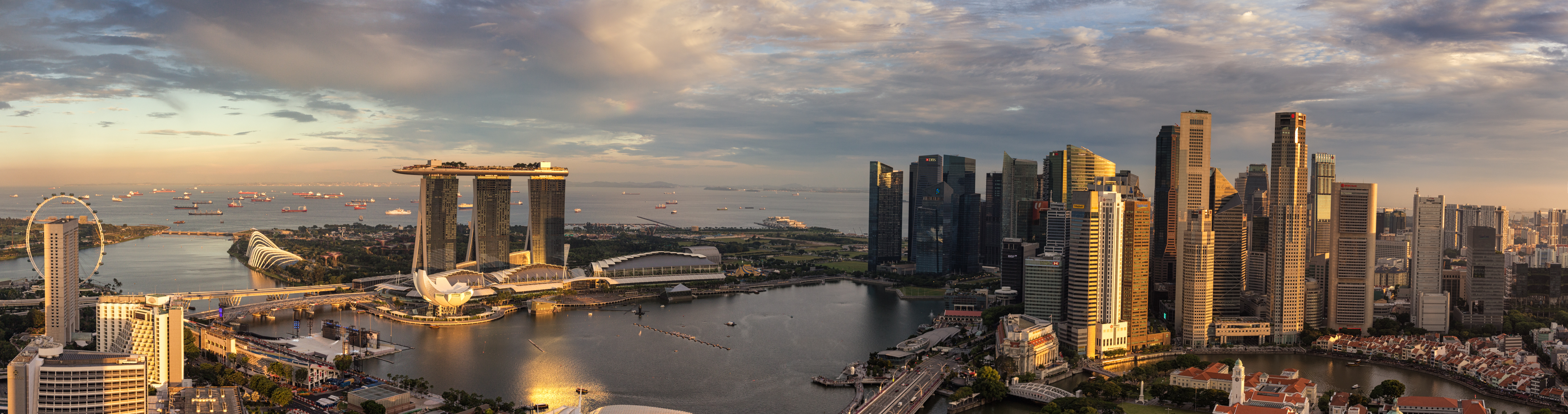
Asian cities such as Singapore have become increasingly popular destinations with the ruling government elite, who own several properties in the region, as part of Zimbabwe's Look East economic policy and as a means of avoiding targeted EU sanctions

== Investment networks and economic impact ==
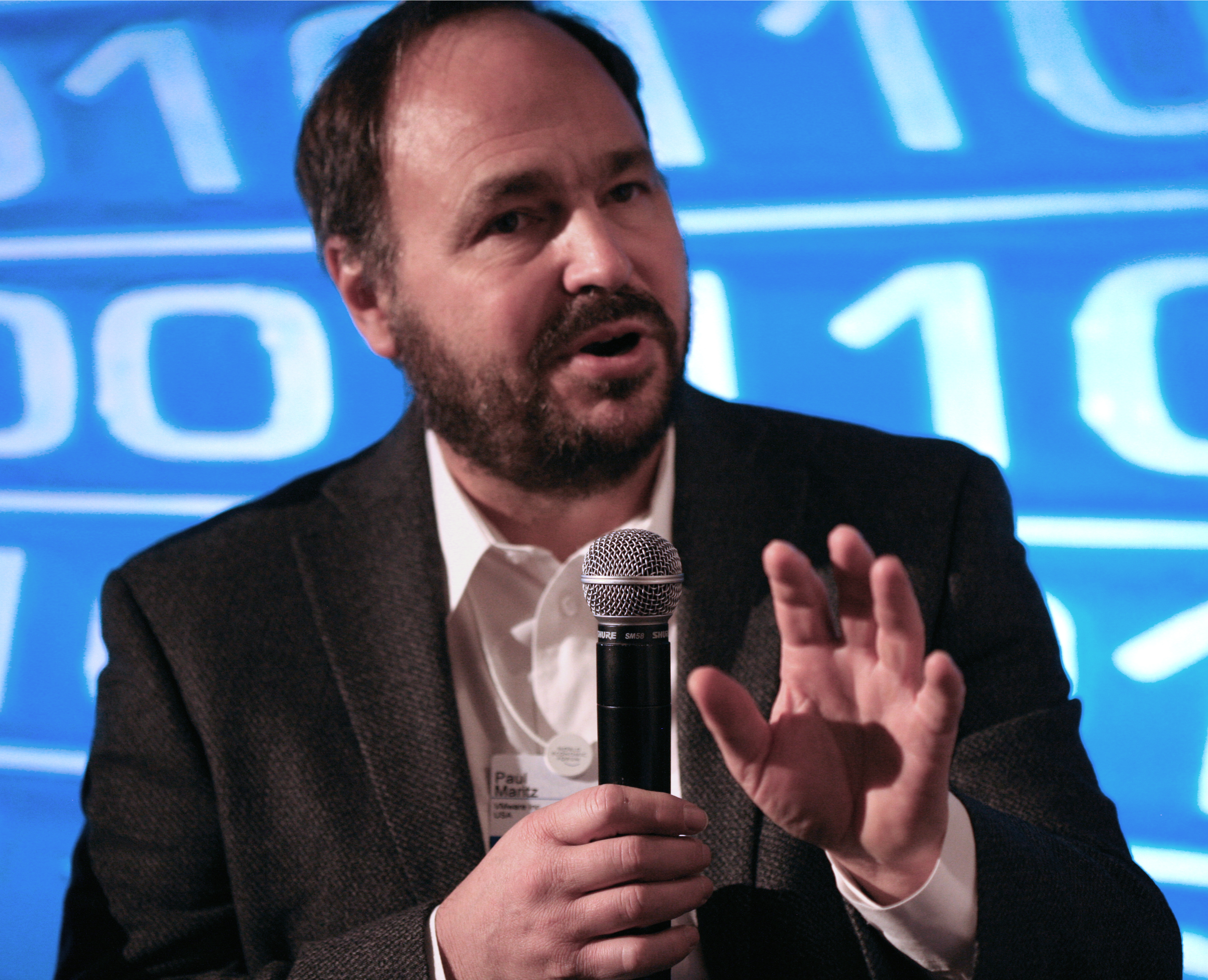
Paul Maritz, is an active philanthropist and investor in projects in developing countries.

Many people of Zimbabwean descent have proved very successful, across various sectors and contexts, particularly those in Great Britain; South Africa; Australia; Canada and the United States, producing businesspeople such as Strive Masiyiwa; Paul Maritz; Trevor Ncube and Sir John Collins amongst others. The Zimbabwean government has attempted to use this to its advantage setting up the Homelink remittance network and attempting to encourage investment by non-resident entrepreneurs. However, the intense and near universal opposition towards the ZANU-PF government by members of the diaspora doomed Homelink to failure, as Zimbabweans abroad used unofficial channels to send money to family members within the country or invested in secure assets such as real estate or the stock market, dampening hopes of securing vital foreign exchange.

Many Zimbabweans accuse the current government of widescale corruption, nepotism and ineptitude, evidenced by the looting of the Marange diamond fields, which has led to near economic collapse, high unemployment and for unleashing violence against the opposition. Still, remittances make up to some 12 per cent of GDP an estimated at $4.9 billion in 2019. However, there remains a great untapped potential for further collaboration and cooperation between the diaspora and stakeholders in their home-country. Foreign direct investment remains low by international standards, with most expatriates strongly opposed to engaging with the current ZANU-PF government.

The Zimbabwean diaspora has used its identity to create strong networks to help its members out. That helped develop productive and profitable networks in Southern Africa and most major English-speaking countries. Those in South Africa in particular, have been successful at increasing trade between the two countries, setting up vital import-export enterprises, that provide Zimbabwe with vital goods it no longer produces. Zimbabwean expatriates play an important role in assisting Zimbabwe and its people through financial support, family and travel visits, businesses and trade, any recovery in the economy of Zimbabwe will almost certainly require their input and assistance, it remains to be seen whether the government can enact the reforms necessary to achieve this.

== Outreach by the Zimbabwean government ==
With 4 to 7 million people abroad, the Zimbabwean government increasingly sees the diaspora as a critical resource for investment, foreign exchange and remittances. Many Zimbabwean communities particularly those in Australia, Canada and the United Kingdom, have become among the most successful communities in their respective countries, with many moving into the middle and upper middle class. Many are now highly integrated and increasingly into their second generation in their respective countries(only South Africa has any notable movement between its diaspora and Zimbabwe itself). Indeed, 16 per cent of those in the UK are ranked as high income earners, well over the national average of 6.5 per cent. Government officials such as Gideon Gono and Mthuli Ncube have sought to entice Zimbabweans abroad to invest and improve the standard of living.

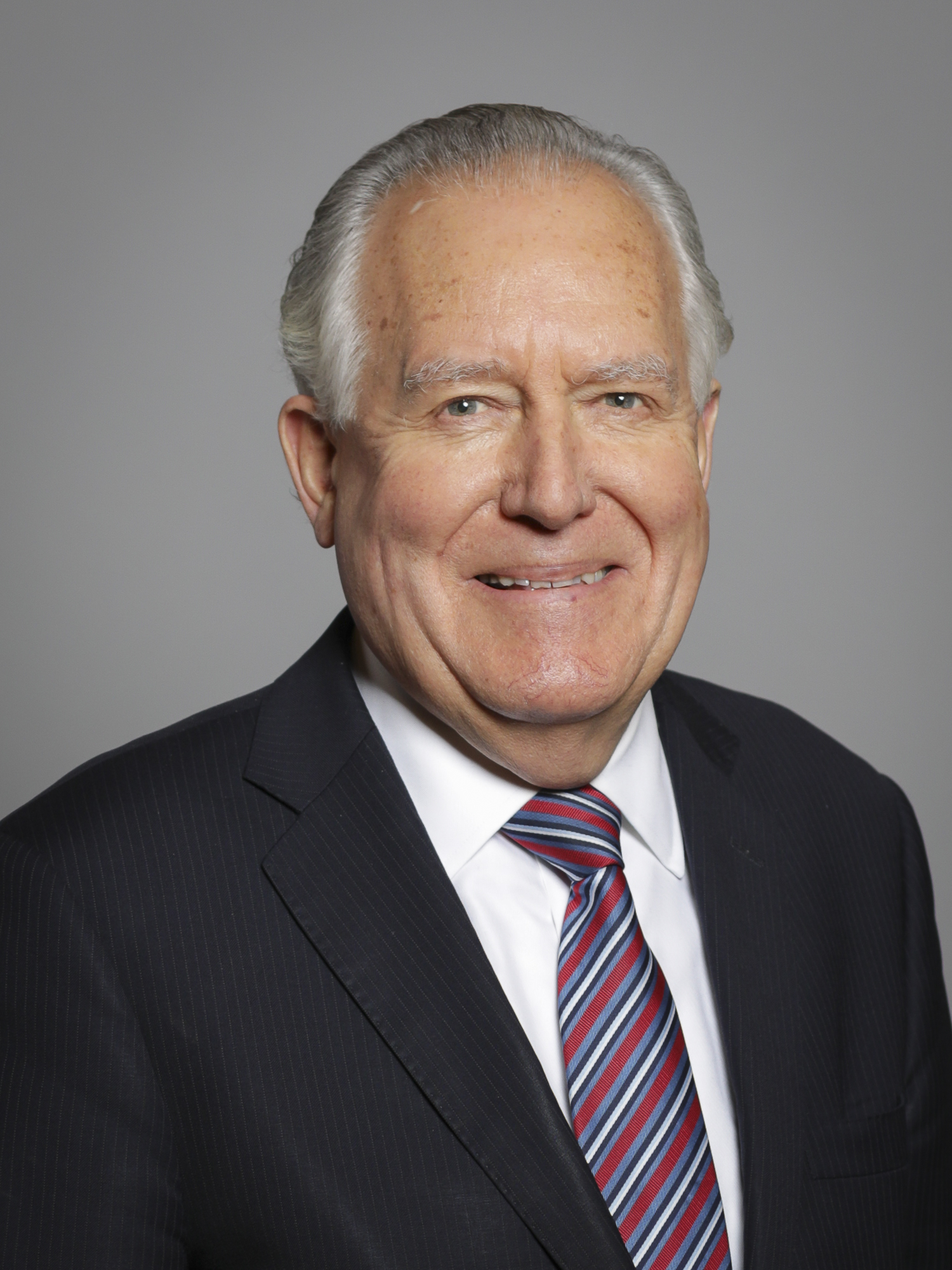
UK Labour peer Lord Peter Hain has long been outspoken on Zimbabwe and previously on friendly terms with Robert Mugabe

The Zimbabwean government launched several programmes to better connect those abroad to Zimbabwe itself, with an objective of improving foreign investment. However, many Zimbabweans abroad, have criticised the government for its high tax rates and anti-competitive policies which have made the costs and ease of doing business difficult, as well as long standing corruption by the ruling party. Partial reforms in the hospitality sector, led to a boom in investment and construction focused on the Victoria Falls region from 2018, joining the decade long real estate boom focused on the Northern suburbs of Harare, however this has all but subsided, due to the economic effects of the COVID-19 pandemic.

In 2014, The government amended the constitution to allow for dual-citizenship during the government of national unity. Given the crisis in Zimbabwe has been going on for nearly two decades, most Zimbabweans in other countries, especially in major English-speaking countries now hold other citizenships. The move was made to encourage links to Zimbabwe, as well as ease travel.

However, a major stumbling block to these initiatives, is the diasporas intense opposition and hostility towards the ZANU PF party. Indeed, Zimbabwean embassies abroad have long been the scene of anti-government protest, with Zimbabwean Britons in particular becoming a very influential lobby group within the country, lobbying the British Labour Party, Liberal Democrats and the UK Conservatives, to withhold any support for the current Mnagagwa government, press for democratic reform and respect for the rule of law, while vigorously supporting the opposition, MDC party. Zimbabweans abroad are overwhelmingly hostile to the present government, and most financial support is largely family or charity-based.

== Zimbabweans of the diaspora ==
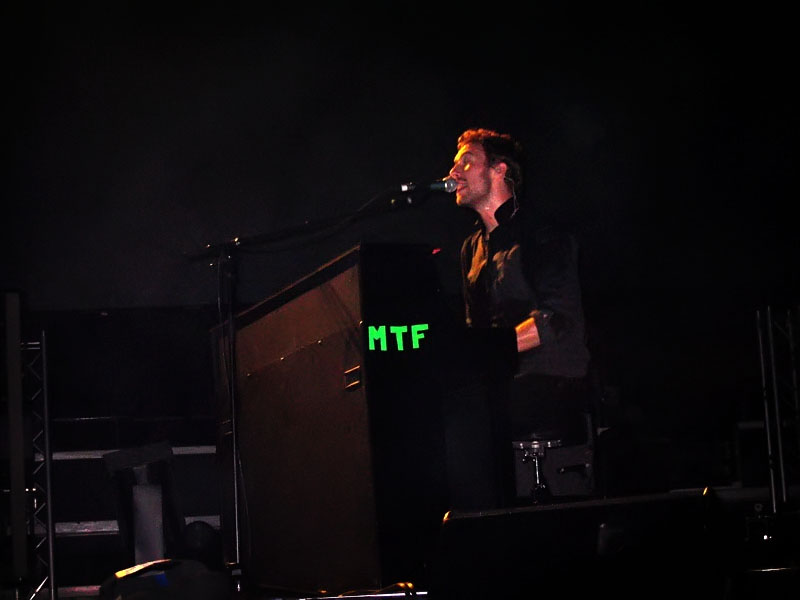
Coldplay singer, Chris Martin during a concert

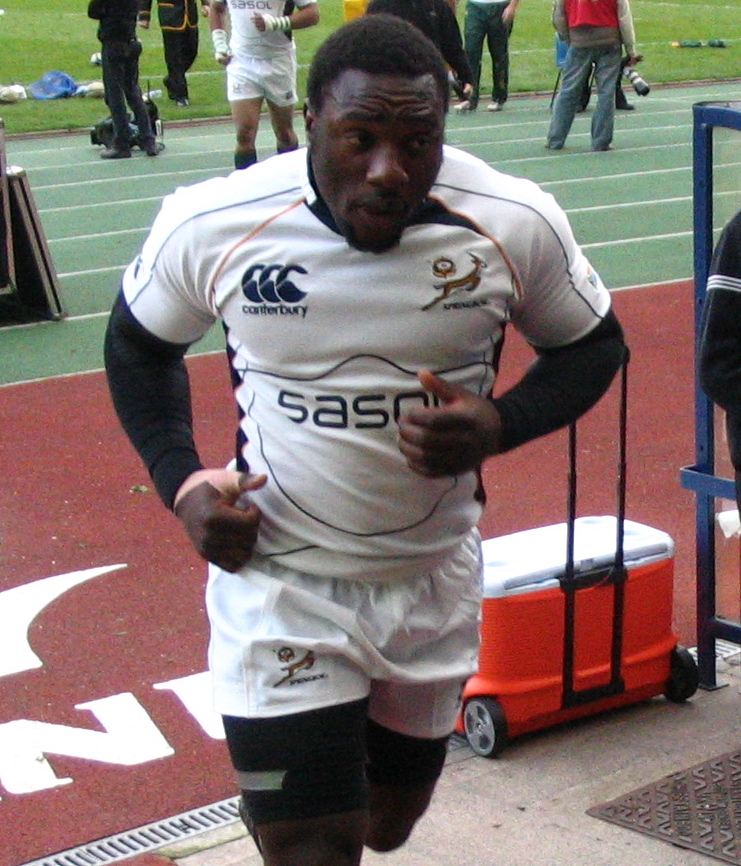
Rugby World cup winner, Tendai Mtawarira

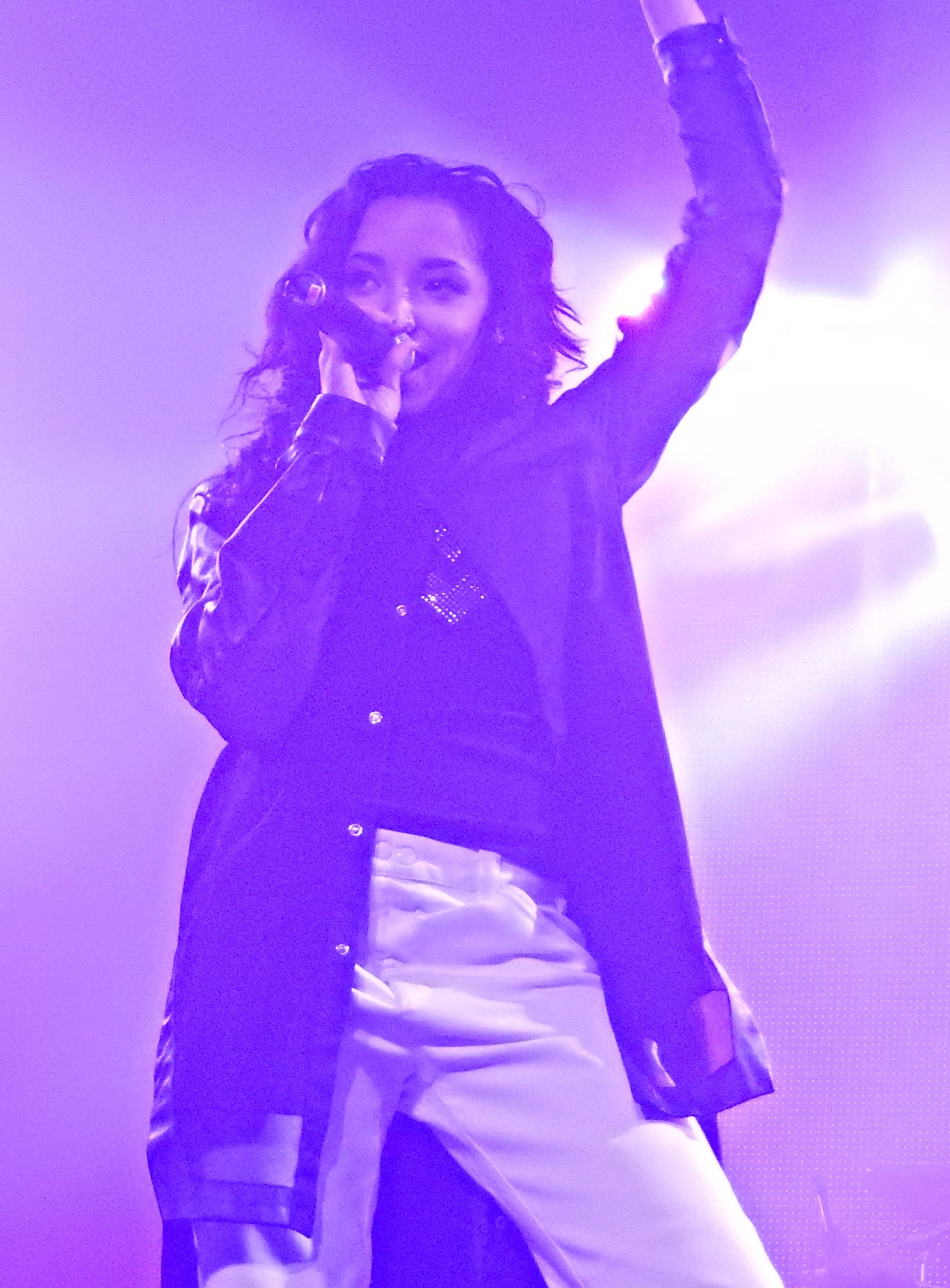
singer, Tinashe in London

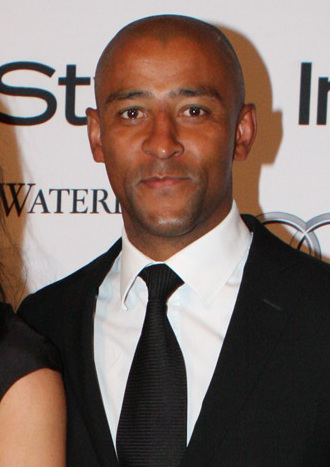
George Gregan

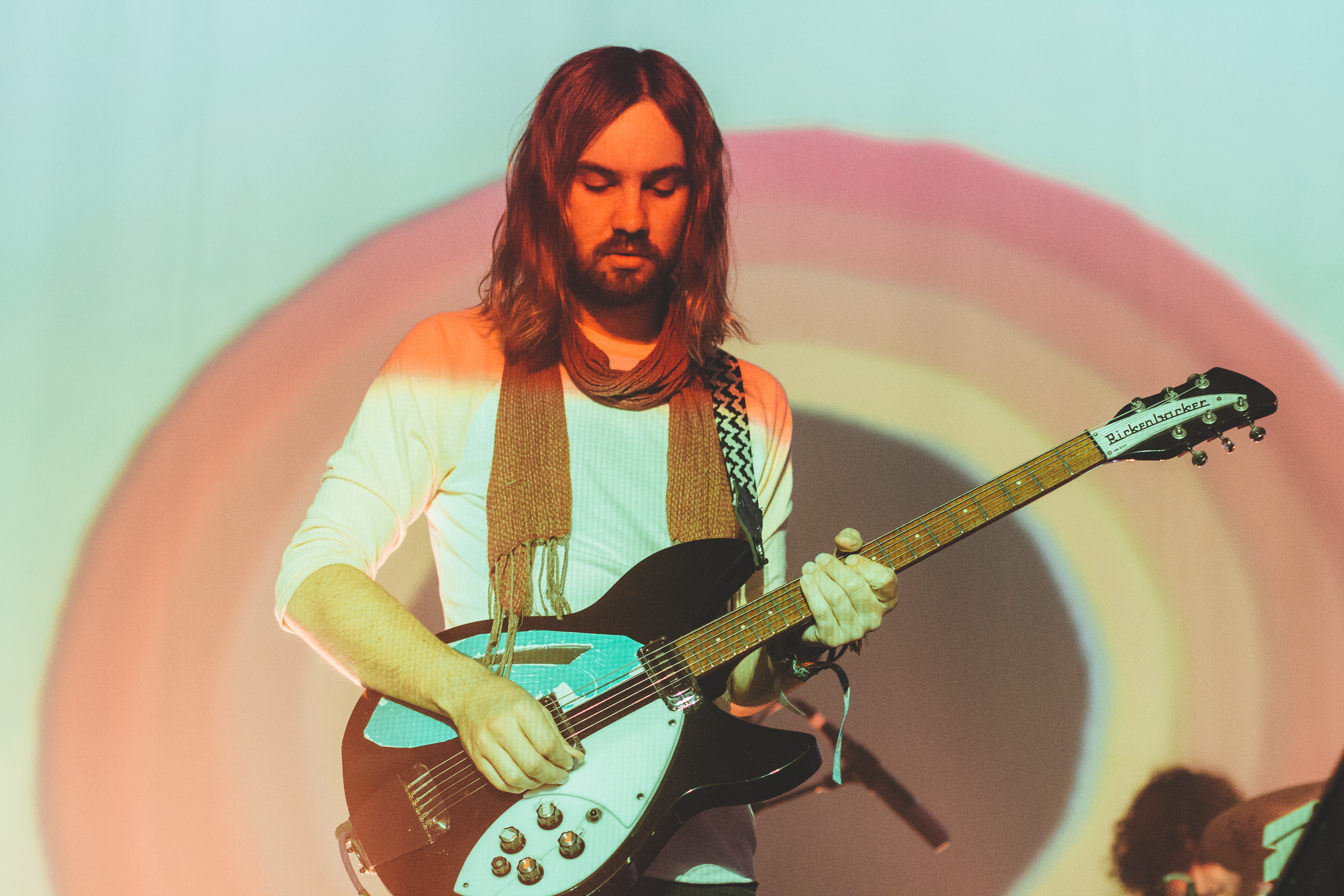
Kevin Parker

Notable people of the diaspora (including those of Zimbabwean ancestry):

A

- Mike Auret
- Allan Anderson (theologian)
- Miles Anderson
- Rob Adams (architect)
- Bert Amato

B

- Kork Ballington
- Gary Ballance
- Janet Banana
- Kundai Benyu
- Michael Berridge
- Brad Barritt
- Heston Blumenthal
- Macauley Bonne
- Duncan Bradshaw
- Ryan Butterworth
- Linda-Gail Bekker
- Dale Benkenstein

C

- Charlene, Princess of Monaco
- David Candler
- Sophie Chandauka
- Maggie Chapman
- Tongoona Charamba
- Alex Callinicos
- Hilton Cartwright
- Rick Cosnett
- Brian Chikwava
- Adam Chicksen
- Radzi Chinyanganya
- Nora Chipaumire
- Bevil Conway
- Gary Crocker
- Ian Crozier
- Johnny Clegg
- Nick Compton
- Ben Curran
- Sam Curran
- Tom Curran (cricketer)
- Derek Chisora
- Chipo Chung
- John Collins (British businessman)
- Adam Croasdell
- Liz Chase
- Rowan Cronjé

D

- Tendayi Darikwa
- Stuart Davidson (cricketer)
- Mati Hlatshwayo Davis
- David Denton
- Jabulani Dhliwayo
- Cheryllyn Dudley
- Brian Dzingai

E

- Chris Ellison (politician)
- Dave Ewers
- Eska (singer)

F

- Norman Featherstone
- Duncan Fletcher
- Sean Fletcher
- Andy Flower

G

- Brendan Galloway
- Adrian Garvey
- Norman Geras
- Michael Gibbs (composer)
- Nathan Gilchrist
- Kyle Godwin
- Scott Gray (rugby union)
- George Gregan
- Anthony Graham (squash player)
- Natalie Gumede
- Danai Gurira
- Bruce Grobbelaar

H

- Richard Halsall
- Angela Hannah
- Paul Harris (South African cricketer)
- Derek Hudson
- Paula Hawkins (author)
- Graeme Hick
- Ryan Higgins (cricketer, born 1995)
- Rujeko Hockley
- Natasha Howard (rower)

I

- Kubi Indi

J

- Jafaris
- Jamelia
- Axcil Jefferies
- Tendayi Jembere
- Gwynne Jones
- Brendon de Jonge

K

- Bruce Keogh
- Tawana Kupe

L

- David Levin (businessman)
- Paul Le Roux
- Doris Lessing
- Lauren Liebenberg
- Mandy Loots

M

- Connie M'Gadzah
- Miles Maclagan
- Paul Maritz
- Adam Madebe
- Mutumwa Mawere
- Anne McClintock
- Julian Mavunga
- Khalil Madovi
- Simon Manyonda
- Nyasha Matonhodze
- Kotaro Matsushima
- MF Doom
- Charles Mudede
- Strive Masiyiwa
- Joe Maphosa
- Chris Martin
- Alexander McCall Smith
- Mark McNulty
- Obi Mhondera
- David Moyo
- Tendai Mtawarira
- Kristine Musademba
- Admiral Muskwe
- Masimba Musodza
- Tkay Maidza
- Lucian Msamati
- Brian Mujati
- Lutalo Muhammad
- Andrew Murray (Australian politician)

N

- Ian Napa
- Malachi Napa
- Reiss Nelson
- Thandie Newton
- Takudzwa Ngwenya
- Peter Niesewand
- Sebastian Negri
- Lewin Nyatanga
- Denis Norman
- Tristan Nydam

P

- Regé-Jean Page
- Nico Parker
- Kevin Parker (musician)
- Nick Price
- Ian Prior (rugby union)
- Callum Paterson
- Andrew Pattison
- Ian Perrie
- David Pocock
- Clive Puzey

R

- Rationale (musician)
- Caylin Raftopoulos
- Andy Rinomhota
- Bradley Robinson (cricketer)
- Douglas Rogers (writer)
- Adam Rouse
- Roxanne Roux
- Kristina Rungano
- Tivonge Rushesha

S

- George Shire
- Glen Salmon
- Patricia Schonstein
- Bobby Skinstad
- Aaron Sloman
- Samuel Robin Spark
- Lauren St John
- Candice Swanepoel
- Gary Teichmann
- James Thindwa
- Tinashe
- Tererai Trent
- Judith Todd
- Kennedy Tsimba

V

- Mariette Van Heerden
- Sindisiwe van Zyl
- Tando Velaphi
- Wayne Visser

W

- Michael Walker, Baron Walker of Aldringham
- Andrew Walton
- Roy Welensky
- Richard Wells (cricketer)
- Gayle Williams
- Jenni Williams
- Billy Woods

Z

- Jordan Zemura

== See also ==
- Zimbabweans in the United Kingdom
- South African diaspora
- Human capital flight
- Diaspora politics
- History of Zimbabwe

== Bibliography ==
- Tevera, Daniel S.; Zinyama, Lovemore (2002), Zimbabweans Who Move: Perspectives on International Migration in Zimbabwe (PDF), vol. 25, Cape Town, South Africa/Ontario, Canada: The Southern African Migration Project, ISBN 1-919798-40-4, archived from the original (PDF) on 6 June 2011
- Tevera, Daniel S.; Crush, Jonathan (2003), The New Brain Drain from Zimbabwe (PDF), Migration Policy Series, vol. 29, Cape Town, South Africa/Ontario, Canada: The Southern African Migration Project, ISBN 1-919798-48-X, archived from the original (PDF) on 6 June 2011
- Steffes, Tracy (2005), "Zimbabweans", in Reiff, Janice L.; Keating, Ann Durkin; Grossman, James (eds.), Electronic Encyclopedia of Chicago, Chicago Historical Society, archived from the original on 29 August 2008
- Polzer, Tara (2008), South African Government and Civil Society Responses to Zimbabwean Migration (PDF), Migration Policy Briefs, vol. 22, Cape Town, South Africa/Ontario, Canada: Southern African Migration Project, archived from the original (PDF) on 6 June 2011
- Betts, Alexander; Kaytaz, Ezra (2009), National and international responses to the Zimbabwean exodus: implications for the refugee protection regime (PDF), Research Papers, vol. 175, Policy Development and Evaluation Service, United Nations High Commissioner for Refugees, archived from the original (PDF) on 27 February 2012
