= Zimbabwean Americans =

Americans of Zimbabwean birth or descent

Total population
- 80,606 (2020)

Regions with significant populations
- New York, Boston, Philadelphia, Washington, D.C. area, Greater Los Angeles, Southern California, Seattle, Denver, Houston, Dallas–Fort Worth metroplex, Minneapolis–Saint Paul, Miami, Atlanta, North Carolina, San Francisco, Honolulu, Chicago, Milwaukee

Languages
- Zimbabwean English, American English, Shona, Ndebele, Tswana, see languages of Zimbabwe

Religion
- Methodism, Anglicanism, Roman Catholic, Reformed Churches, Jewish, minority: irreligion

Related ethnic groups
- South African Americans; Kenyan Americans; Zimbabwean Canadians; Namibian Americans; Other African immigrants to the United States

Zimbabwean Americans are Americans of full or partial Zimbabwean ancestry. As of 2021, there were approximately 80,606 people of Zimbabwean descent were living in the United States. There are notable populations in Southern California, greater Washington, D.C., New York City and Texas.

== History ==
The first great wave of immigration from Rhodesia (modern-day Zimbabwe) took place during and after the Rhodesian Bush War in the 1970s, a time when many white Rhodesian families emigrated due to political and economic conditions. Although initially many emigrated mostly to neighboring South Africa, because they shared a common language and heritage, and the United Kingdom, the former colonial power, subsequently they increasingly emigrated to the United States and Australia, countries that, like the above, shared a similar language and heritage. Following the independence of Zimbabwe from the UK in 1980, these immigrants identified themselves as Rhodesians, united by their shared struggles experienced during the Bush War.

In the 1980s, a second wave of people from Zimbabwe came to the United States, mostly students that preferred to return to their country after completing their studies. This emigration of students was increased in the 1990s and included both white and black people. Due to the high competitiveness in accessing university education in their home country, many Zimbabwean students emigrated to other countries to complete their studies. Most of them sought degrees linked to technology and business. Unlike earlier Zimbabwean students, many in the 1990s decided to live in the United States for good after completing their studies, given the negative economic situation in Zimbabwe and the better job opportunities that they could find in the United States. Thus, the majority of Zimbabweans who have migrated to the United States during the past few decades have been students and young professionals.

== Demographics ==
In 2014, the Zimbabwean population in the United States was noted as one of "a strong skilled and non-skilled diaspora population" that is also focused in South Africa, the UK and Australia. Thus, Zimbabweans in the United States make up just a small part of the Zimbabwean diaspora compared to the larger communities in South Africa and the United Kingdom. However, in 2020 The United Nations Population Division of recorded the number of Zimbabweans in the US to number 80,606, a figure that notably increased from a decade earlier. Similar to former British territories such as, Australia and South Africa, Zimbabwe was traditionally a destination of immigrants from Europe and Africa beginning in the late 19th century and lasting until the late 20th century. As a result, few Zimbabweans lived in the US prior to the 1990s, with most preferring South Africa, the UK and Australia instead.

There are various conflicting figures on the exact number of Zimbabweans in the US. The RAND Corporation estimated in 2000 that there were 100,000 in the state of New York alone. In contrast, a 2008 estimate from the Association of Zimbabweans Based Abroad put the population of Zimbabweans in the whole US at just 45,000. They make up just a small part of the Zimbabwean diaspora compared to the larger communities in South Africa and the United Kingdom. Many Zimbabweans who emigrate, particularly those with British, Malawian, Portuguese, Greek, and Mozambiquean ancestry hold or are eligible for dual citizenship, which makes determining their exact numbers difficult. Despite this, the vast majority of Zimbabweans identify both with their nationality and country of origin.

The history of Zimbabwean migration to the United States is very recent. Before 1980, the few Zimbabweans that left the country migrated to other the United Kingdom or South Africa. The emergence of socioeconomic problems beginning in the 1990s, led to a small wave of emigration, which included large numbers of well-educated professionals, particularly in finance and the medical field and students who began to seek out the US as an alternative destination. This was followed by a larger wave after 2001, following a protracted economic crisis in the country

Most Zimbabweans find it relatively easy to adapt to life in large cities in the United States, due to their English fluency, skills and a multicultural society that makes it easier to adapt to American life. In addition, the high value that is given to higher education has led many Zimbabwean students to migrate to the United States to continue their university studies there.

Historically white Zimbabweans were concentrated in Los Angeles and Southern California, Philadelphia, Dallas-Fort Worth, Houston, Tampa, and Atlanta in 2000. However, as the community grew and diversified, most Zimbabweans now tend to reside in the Washington, D.C., area, New York City, Southern California and Dallas–Fort Worth and Houston. Other notable centers of the Zimbabwean American population are New Jersey; Greater Philadelphia; the San Francisco Bay Area; Atlanta; Boston; Chicago; North Carolina and Indianapolis. Sharing a similar history, culture and lifestyle, many Zimbabweans and South Africans have formed close bonds in the US and tend to live in similar communities with many forming associations and sharing family ties. Indeed, South Africans and Zimbabweans are among the most skilled and professionally employed immigrants in the US today, with nearly 60 per cent of them holding a bachelor's degree or higher based on a 2005 study. Despite this there are evident economic disparities between long settled citizens and recent arrivals with few ties to North America.

== Organizations ==
There is an important organization in Indianapolis of Zimbabwean having annual celebrations of Independence Day (April 18) and other events, such as the first Annual Convention and Business Expo Zimbabwe in 2002. Due to the limited success of the Zimbabwean living in Chicago to create organizations (because their community is dispersed through the city), they have formed ties with the organization of Zimbabwe in Indianapolis. Other Zimbabwean association is the Zimbabwe-United States of America Alumni Association (ZUSAA).

== Notable people ==
- Farai Chideya
- Mati Hlatshwayo Davis
- Jabulani Dhliwayo
- Sean Fletcher
- Alexandra Govere
- Danai Gurira
- Phillimon Hanneck
- Nyasha Hatendi
- Paul Maritz
- Julian Mavunga
- Sibongile Mlambo
- Charles Mudede
- Kristine Musademba
- Takudzwa Ngwenya
- Andrew Pattison
- James Thindwa
- Tinashe
- Tererai Trent
- Billy Woods (rapper)
- MF Doom

== See also ==
- Zimbabwean diaspora
- Zimbabwean Canadians
- Zimbabweans in the United Kingdom
- Zimbabwean Australians
- Zimbabwean New Zealanders
- Southern Africans in the United States
- Kutsinhira Cultural Arts Center
- United States–Zimbabwe relations
