= Zimbabweans in the United Kingdom =

Zimbabwean diaspora in the UK

Total population
- Zimbabwe-born residents in the United Kingdom: 130,593 – 0.2% (2021/22 Census) (Note: Does not include Zimbabweans born in the United Kingdom or those with ancestry rooted in Zimbabwe); England: 121,346 – 0.2% (2021); Scotland: 5,282 – 0.1% (2022); Wales: 2,801 – 0.09% (2021); Northern Ireland: 1,164 – 0.06% (2021); Zimbabwean citizens/passports held: 29,990 (England and Wales only, 2021); Ethnic Zimbabweans: Zimbabweans in Black ethnic group: 43,529; Zimbabweans in White ethnic group: 1,803 (England and Wales only, 2021)

Regions with significant populations
- London · Luton · Leeds · Slough · Milton Keynes · Manchester · Birmingham · Leicester

Languages
- English (British English) · Shona · Ndebele

Religion
- Protestantism · Catholicism

Related ethnic groups
- Black British · South African British, Kenyan British, Australian British

Zimbabwean Britons are British people who were born in Zimbabwe or can trace their ancestry to immigrants from Zimbabwe who emigrated to the United Kingdom. While the first natives of the country then known as Southern Rhodesia arrived in Britain in larger numbers from the late-1960s, the majority of immigrants arrived during the 1990s and 2000s. The Zimbabwean community in the UK is extremely diverse, consisting of individuals of differing racial, ethnic, class, and political groups. There are a diverse mix of asylum seekers, professionals, investors, businesspeople, labour migrants, students, graduates, undocumented migrants, and others who have gained British citizenship.

== History and settlement ==
The International Organization for Migration has characterised Zimbabwean migration to the UK as divided into three waves. The initial wave of significant Zimbabwean migration consisted of White Zimbabweans who migrated after the country's transition to Black majority rule in 1980, due to uncertainty about their future after losing their privileges. The second major wave lasted from 1990–97, caused by the economic hardship that resulted from Zimbabwe's application of the World Bank and International Monetary Fund's Structural Adjustment Programme. The third wave began in 1998 and has resulted from political and social unrest in Zimbabwe, owing to Mugabeist policies focused on land reform, race relations and persecution of political opponents. Prior to November 2002, Zimbabweans were free to travel to the UK without a visa and this provided a route to political asylum. In November 2002, the UK Government introduced the requirement for Zimbabweans to apply for visas in order to travel to the UK, making it more difficult for them to apply for asylum. The number of Zimbabweans applying for asylum has fallen, and increasing numbers have sought refuge in neighbouring South Africa instead.

In contrast, wealthier Zimbabweans tend to have an easier route to the UK, with many having family or ancestral ties to the country, while others are able to arrive as skilled professionals, investors or students, making the community wealthier than arrivals from other countries in Africa and more comparable to South African or Australian Britons.

== Demographics ==
Beginning as early as 1965, after the Rhodesian Unilateral Declaration of Independence, Zimbabweans began move to Britain permanently, settling in places that offered greater access to employment, establishing significant communities in Greater London; Berkshire; Buckinghamshire; Hertfordshire, as well as Reading, Luton, Slough and Milton Keynes. There are also smaller communities of Zimbabwean Britons in Leeds, Greater Manchester, Edinburgh, Glasgow, Oxford, Cambridge and Bristol. Overall Zimbabwean Britons tend to be more present in Southern England and metropolitan regions than the British population as a whole.

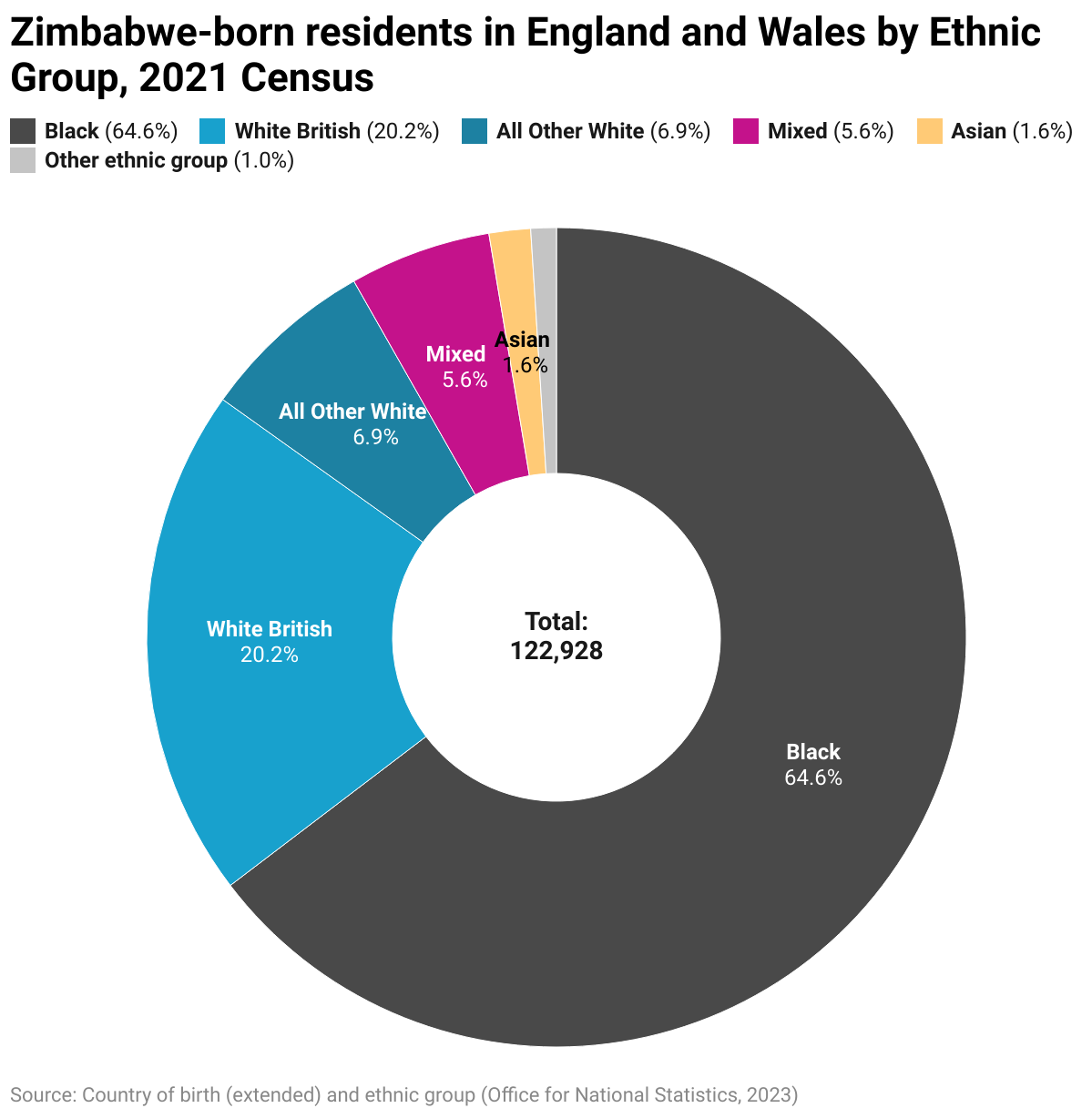
Zimbabwe-born residents by ethnic group (2021 census, England and Wales)

While white Zimbabweans were the first to migrate to the UK in large numbers, the majority of Zimbabweans in the UK today are of Shona descent, with significant minorities of Ndebele, European, Asian and mixed-race descent. Additionally, a disproportionate number of Jewish Zimbabweans are represented in the UK compared to similar communities in Australia and South Africa.

=== Population ===
The majority of Zimbabweans in the UK are first-generation immigrants. According to Census figures, in 1971 some 7,905 people born in what is now Zimbabwe were living in the UK. This figure rose to 16,330 in 1981 and to 21,252 in 1991. The 2001 UK Census recorded 49,524 people residing in the UK who had been born in Zimbabwe. The Office for National Statistics estimates that in 2019 there were 128,000 people resident in the UK who had been born in Zimbabwe.

Unofficial estimates of the total Zimbabwean British population, including those born in the UK of Zimbabwean origin, vary significantly. Numerous newspapers have speculated that the population might be as large as one million, including an estimate of 600,000 by The Observer in 2003, but community organisations and leaders put the population in the range of 200,000 to 500,000.

=== Spread and distribution ===
The Zimbabwean population is widely dispersed across the UK, albeit with a greater concentration in south east England. The largest communities can be found in the UK's larger cities and towns. The table below shows the geographic spread of Zimbabwean people in the UK in 2006, based on estimates by community leaders.

| Estimated Zimbabwean population | Location(s) |
| 40,000 | London |
| 20,000 each | Leeds, Luton |
| 10,000 each | Milton Keynes, Sheffield, Slough, Coventry, Glasgow, Leicester, Wolverhampton |
| 5,000 each | Birmingham, Manchester, Wolverhampton |
| 3,000 each | Edinburgh, Liverpool |
| 2,000 | Bristol |
| 1,000 each | Cardiff, Oxford, Nottingham |

The table below shows the population of Zimbabwe-born people by district in England and Wales according to results of the 2021 Census.

| Estimated Zimbabwean population | Location(s) |
| 3,000+ | Birmingham, Leicester, London |
| 2,000+ | Milton Keynes, West Northamptonshire, West Yorkshire, South Yorkshire |
| 1,500+ | Buckinghamshire, Manchester, Coventry, North Northamptonshire, Sheffield, Wolverhampton, Nottingham |
| 1,000+ | Luton, Sandwell, Derby, Southend-on-Sea, Croydon, Southampton, Central Bedfordshire |

== Assimilation ==
Zimbabwean immigrants and their children tend to adapt quickly to British society due to the long ties between the two countries, near identical education systems and high levels of education and English fluency compared to most immigrants to the UK. Studies have pointed to the higher rate of English use among Zimbabweans, their willingness to marry non-Zimbabweans, and their eagerness to become naturalised citizens as factors that contribute to their rapid assimilation, as well as their interactions with the greater British-born community. In addition, Zimbabwe has also been a melting pot of many cultures and languages, making assimilating to a more multicultural Britain easier. A minority of Zimbabweans on the other hand, particularly those who arrived as asylum seekers or with less resources, tended to struggle upon arriving in the UK and would find themselves overrepresented in high demand but less prestigious sectors such as nursing and childcare.

Many Britons tend to confuse Zimbabweans and South Africans, based on their accents and history, despite the rejection that they feel toward the behaviour of many South Africans, regarded by Zimbabweans as less tolerant and cosmopolitan, they have often been lumped together with them and face the same challenges and discrimination that South African immigrants have faced in United Kingdom. Despite this, both communities have adapted well to British society with over 15% of settled Zimbabweans ranked as high earners, more than twice the national average of nearly 7%. As with South African Britons, Zimbabwean Britons tend to live individually rather than in large groups and are thus spread across much of the UK, albeit with a larger concentration in Greater London and South East England.

== Notable people ==
- Don Armand – England and Exeter Chiefs rugby player
- Percelle Ascott – actor
- Garry Ballance - English cricketer & captain of Yorkshire CCC
- Macauley Bonne
- Munya Chawawa - actor and comedian
- Adam Chicksen - Zimbabwe and Notts County football player.
- Brian Chikwava – writer and musician
- Derek Chisora – professional boxer
- Kenny Chitsvatsva – drummer for Bhundu Boys
- Nick Compton – former England cricketer.
- John Collins – former Chief Executive of Shell
- Tom Curran - English cricketer
- Sam Curran - English cricketer
- Daniel Dumile – rapper and producer
- Duncan Fletcher – former coach of the English cricket team
- Norman Geras – academic and authority on Marxism
- Bruce Grobbelaar – former footballer and Liverpool FC Goalkeeper
- Graeme Hick – English cricketer
- Kubi Indi – development activist, businesswoman and actress
- Tendayi Jembere – actor
- Rise Kagona - musician
- Miles Maclagan – professional tennis player and coach
- Alexander McCall Smith – author and expert on medical law and bioethics
- Masimba Musodza – novelist
- Adelaide Muskwe - Zimbabwean netball player
- Admiral Dalindlela Muskwe Forward for Luton Town Football Club
- Benjani Mwaruwari – footballer for Portsmouth FC, Manchester City, Blackburn Rovers and Sunderland
- Ian Napa – bantamweight boxing champion
- Peter Ndlovu – footballer; first African player to score a goal in the Premier League
- Reiss Nelson – Arsenal footballer
- Thandiwe Newton – actress
- Lewin Nyatanga – footballer of Zimbabwean and Welsh descent
- Regé-Jean Page – actor
- Nico Parker - actress
- Andy Rinomhota
- Rozalla – house musician and singer
- Shingai Shoniwa – singer/musician
- Ryan Watson - Scottish cricketer
- Khalil Madovi - actor and artist

== See also ==
- United Kingdom-Zimbabwe relations
- Foreign-born population of the United Kingdom
- Zimbabwean diaspora
- Zimbabwean Australian
- Zimbabwean Americans
- South African British
- Zimbabwean Canadians
- Zimbabwean New Zealanders
