= Zimbabwean Australians =

Australian citizens of Zimbabwean descent

Total population
- 65,000

Regions with significant populations
- Perth; Sydney; Melbourne; Brisbane; Adelaide; Western Australia; southeast Queensland

Languages
- English; Shona; Ndebele; Afrikaans; Nyanja

Related ethnic groups
- African Australians; South African Australians

Zimbabwean Australians are Australian citizens who are fully or partially of Zimbabwean descent or Zimbabwe-born people who reside in Australia. They include migrants to Australia of people from Zimbabwe (Rhodesia or Southern Rhodesia until 1980), as well as their descendants. Today, there are over 65,000 Zimbabwean Australians, with significant growth since 2000, coinciding with the sociopolitical crisis there.

Australia's Zimbabwean community is now well established, with some of the highest incomes in the country, as well as with community institutions such as Zimbabwean language schools.

== Background ==
The number of permanent settlers arriving in Australia from Zimbabwe since 1991 (monthly)

Much like South Africans, Zimbabweans began immigrating to Australia in the late 1970s, in modest numbers of mostly white Zimbabweans until the late nineties. Since 2000, the volume of migration has increased and diversified significantly, with a mix of professionals, investors, students and recent graduates choosing to move to Australia. Compared to their contemporaries in South Africa, the Zimbabwean community in Australia is highly educated and firmly within the middle class. The vast majority are skilled and educated, with 74.5% of the Zimbabwe-born aged 15 years and over possessing higher non-school qualifications, compared to 55.9% of the Australian population. Some Zimbabweans had originally moved to South Africa or the UK, but decided to settle in Australia instead.

=== Economic Profile ===
Zimbabweans form a significant community in Australia with their numbers having grown to over 34,787 Zimbabwe-born as of 2018. When including their Australian and foreign born members, the government estimates at least 80,000 people being equally divided between black and white Zimbabweans The community is now well established, with some of the highest incomes in the country, as well as with community institutions such as Zimbabwean language schools. One in three of Australia's Shona and Ndebele-speakers live in Sydney with other concentrations of Zimbabweans in Perth, Melbourne and Queensland. Indeed, some 78 per cent of Zimbabwean Aussie adults hold a tertiary degree, making them the best educated group in the country

== Population distribution ==
Australia's Zimbabwean population is biggest in Sydney. Historically, Perth was a popular first stop for recent migrants, thanks to its relative proximity to Southern Africa and its already established South African Australian population but increasingly, modern immigrants are drawn to Sydney and Melbourne although a large proportion of Zimbabweans in Australia still reside in Western Australia. Many white Zimbabweans have settled in Queensland, whereas people of indigenous Shona and Ndebele ethnicities commonly settle in Sydney or Melbourne.

=== Language ===
==== New South Wales ====
Australians who speak a language indigenous to Zimbabwe at home are most numerous in Sydney. One in three of Australia's Ndebele-speakers and one in three of Australia's Shona-speakers live in Sydney.

==== Victoria ====
English, Shona and Afrikaans are the main languages Zimbabwean Australians in Victoria speak at home. 53% of Zimbabwean Australians in Victoria speak English, while 36% speak Shona and 1% speak Afrikaans.

== Notable Zimbabwean Australians ==
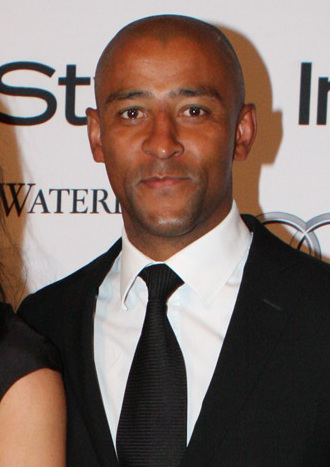
George Gregan

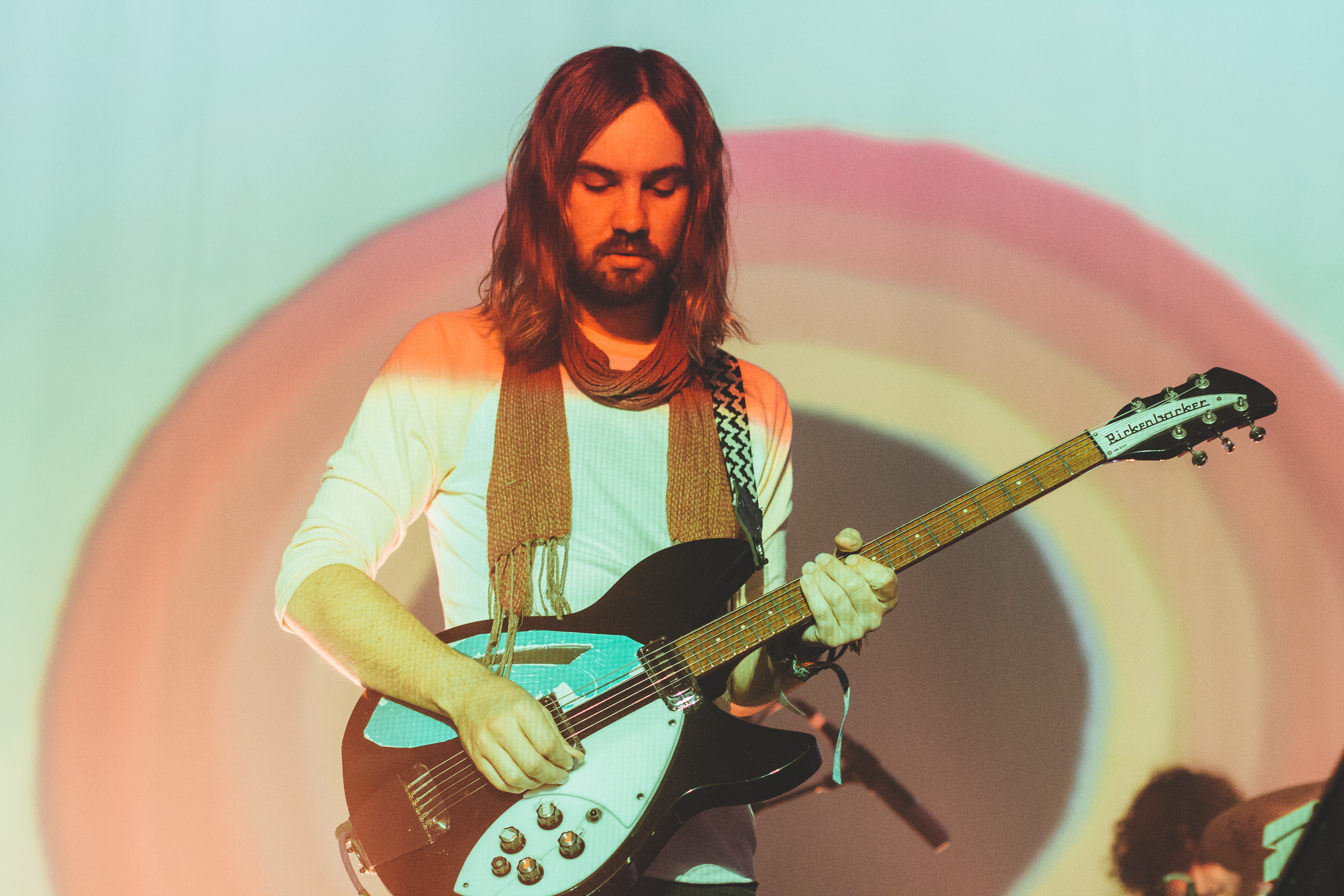
Kevin Parker

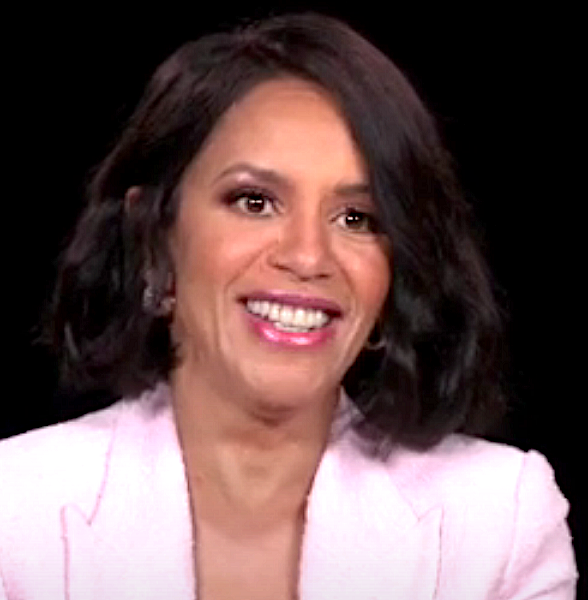
Sara Zwangobani

- Rob Adams – architect
- Greg Aplin – former television manager and politician in New South Wales
- Scott Brant
- Hilton Cartwright – cricket player for Western Australia and the Australian national cricket team
- Rick Cosnett – actor
- Chris Ellison – lawyer and former Senator for Western Australia
- Jerome Farah – musician
- George Gregan – Rugby World Cup winner and former captain of Australia
- Kyle Godwin – rugby player for the Western Force
- Murray Goodwin – cricketer for Zimbabwe and Western Australia
- Elizabeth Haran – novelist
- Panashe Madanha – professional football player for Adelaide United
- Tkay Maidza – singer-songwriter
- Solomon Mire – Big Bash and retired Zimbabwean cricketer
- Audius Mtawarira – singer and record producer
- Andrew Murray – former Senator for the Australian Democrats
- Janine Murray – rhythmic gymnast
- Mufaro Mugwenhi - Musician
- Pacharo Mzembe – actor
- Tendai Mzungu – Australian rules footballer for Fremantle Football Club and Greater Western Sydney Giants
- Sekai Nzenza-Shand
- Akime Marisa – Pharmacy Proprietor
- Mluleki Nkala Bank Operations Manager- ex-Zimbabwean cricketer
- Henry Olonga – opera singer and ex-Zimbabwean cricketer. The Voice contestant.
- Kevin Parker – multi-instrumentalist, producer and lead singer of Tame Impala
- Ian Perrie – former Australian rules footballer who played for the Adelaide Crows
- David Pocock – Senator and former player for the Australian national rugby union team
- Ian Prior – rugby player for the Western Force
- Clive Puzey – racing driver
- Carmouflage Rose – stage name of rapper Larry Herrington.
- Thando Sikwila – singer, songwriter and actor
- Tando Velaphi – professional football player for Perth Glory
- Elijah Ziyambe – Association footballer who has played for Werribee City FC and Hume City FC
- Alfonso Zvenyika Lambarda
- Sara Zwangobani – actress The Lord of the Rings: The Rings of Power
- Nyasha Mudzinganyama - Business & Finance

== See also ==
- Zimbabwean diaspora
- South African Australian
- Zimbabwean Canadians
- Zimbabwean Americans
- Zimbabweans in the United Kingdom
- Zimbabwean New Zealanders
