= South Africans in the Netherlands =

- (Netherlands) (South Africa)

Total population
- 41,300 (2023)

Regions with significant populations
- Amsterdam, The Hague, Rotterdam, Utrecht

Languages
- Dutch, Afrikaans, English

Religion
- Mainly Christianity (Protestantism, Dutch Reformed Church and Calvinism)

Related ethnic groups
- Dutch, Afrikaners, South Africans

South Africans in the Netherlands (Afrikaans: Suid-Afrikaners in Nederland; Dutch: Zuid-Afrikanen in Nederland) refers to South Africans living in the Netherlands, or Dutch people of South African descent.

== History ==
South African born population in the Netherlands
Year	Pop.	±%
1996	9,629	—
2001	13,459	+39.8%
2006	15,487	+15.1%
2011	17,527	+13.2%
2016	19,877	+13.4%
2017	20,859	+4.9%
2018	21,878	+4.9%
2019	23,738	+8.5%
2020	26,354	+11.0%
2021	28,562	+8.4%
2022	31,693	+11.0%
Source: CBS

Most South Africans in the Netherlands are Afrikaners, a population group descended from Dutch (and to a lesser extent German and French) colonists who settled in the Cape Colony from 1652 onwards. There is also a smaller minority of Coloured South-Africans in the Netherlands, a multi-racial people group descending from various groups (Europeans, Africans and Asians) and other white South Africans of non-Afrikaner descent (British, Portuguese etc).

Afrikaners and Coloured South-Africans mainly speak Afrikaans, a daughter language and variant of Dutch from the seventeenth and eighteenth centuries, with loanwords from English, Malay, German, and to a lesser extent also Khoi, San and also from some Bantu languages.

While 21,878 South Africans were still living in the Netherlands on January 1, 2018, this number had increased to 30,902 in October 2021. This made South Africans one of the fastest growing population groups in the Netherlands during this period, the number have since doubled further into more than 40,000 as of 2023.

== Demographics ==
South African born population in the Netherlands
Year	Total
1996	9 629
2001	13 459
2006	15 487
2011	17 527
2016	19 877
2021	28 562
2022	31 693

== Notable people ==
- Bernard Loots – Cricketer
- Ferdi and Rob Bolland – Music producer duo
- Clayton Floyd
- Colin Ackermann
- Dik Abed
- Eric Szwarczynski
- Marieke Ehlers – Politician
- Marlene Dumas – Painter
- Philippe Boissevain
- Sean Bergin – Musician
- Sybrand Engelbrecht
- Stephan Myburgh
- Tania Leon – Women's rights and anti-Apartheid activist
- Vincent Brümmer – Theologian
- Wesley Barresi

== See also ==
- Netherlands–South Africa relations
- South African diaspora
- Immigration to the Netherlands
