= Zimbabwean New Zealanders =

Total population
- 5,614

Regions with significant populations
- Auckland Wellington Hamilton Christchurch

Languages
- English; Shona; Ndebele

Related ethnic groups
- South African New Zealanders • African New Zealanders

Zimbabwean New Zealanders are New Zealand citizens who are fully or partially of Zimbabwean descent or Zimbabwe-born people who reside in New Zealand. They include migrants to New Zealand of people from Zimbabwe, as well as their descendants. Today, over 5,614 people in New Zealand have Zimbabwean ancestry in 2016, making them the second largest source of African immigrants to New Zealand after South Africa.

Despite this, they form one of New Zealand's smaller immigrant communities, often blending into New Zealand society, as anglophones, compared to the much larger Polynesian and Asian communities. New Zealand and Zimbabwe have long shared cultural ties, as part of the Commonwealth of Nations, particularly in the realms of sport and education, which has made the country a familiar and attractive destination for Zimbabweans. Initially, many Zimbabwean New Zealanders were of white Zimbabwean origin, however as immigration has grown since 2000, the population has diversified to reflect the demographics of Zimbabwe, with a notable plurality of Shona people.

Zimbabwean New Zealand are overwhelmingly concentrated on the North Island, particularly Wellington, Auckland and Hamilton. They form the second largest African community after South Africans and are predominantly English-speaking and well educated, thus integrating well into New Zealand society.

== Notable Zimbabwean New Zealanders ==
- Colin de Grandhomme - Dual New Zealand-Zimbabwean cricket player for the New Zealand national cricket team
- Gareth Evans - Rugby player for Hawkes Bay and the Hamilton Chiefs in Super Rugby
- Dion Ebrahim - cricket coach for Central Districts and former player for the Zimbabwe national cricket team
- Tinashe Marowa - New Zealand professional footballer for Eastern Suburbs.
- Tamupiwa Dimairo - professional footballer for the Wellington Phoenix FC and Bruno's Magpies
- Mark Hewlett - radio host
- Ryan Sissons - triathlete representing New Zealand at the Olympics
- Peter Younghusband - cricket player for the Wellington Firebirds

== See also ==
- Zimbabwean diaspora
- Zimbabwean Australians
- Zimbabweans in the United Kingdom
- Zimbabwean Canadians
- Zimbabwean Americans
