= Southern Africans in the United States =

United States residents or citizens of recent Southern African descent and heritage

Southern Africans in the United States are Americans with ancestry from Southern Africa. They include:

- Angolan Americans
- Basotho Americans
- Botswanan Americans
- Comorian Americans
- Malagasy Americans
- Malawian Americans
- Mozambican Americans
- Namibian Americans
- Seychellois Americans
- South African Americans
- Swazi Americans
- Tanzanian Americans
- Zambian Americans
- Zimbabwean Americans

== See also ==
- Southern Africa
