= South African diaspora =

Ethnic group

South Africa diaspora
- Flag of South Africa

- Map of the South African diaspora in the world

Total population
- ~915,000

Regions with significant populations
- United Kingdom: 235,060 (2021/22)
- Australia: 229,950 (2025)
- United States: 156,094 (2024)
- United Arab Emirates: ~100,000 (2014)
- New Zealand: 95,577 (2023)
- Canada: 51,590 (2021)
- Netherlands: 41,300 (2023)
- Israel: 22,315 (2021)
- Germany: 20,378 (2020)
- Mozambique: 20,171 (2020)
- Zimbabwe: 19,731 (2020)
- Ireland: 15,886 (2022)
- Eswatini: 12,712 (2020)
- Portugal: 10,630 (2021)
- Mauritius: 10,000 (2024)
- Namibia: 8,883 (2020)
- Switzerland: 8,324 (2020)
- Greece: 7,045 (2020)
- Qatar: ~6,500 (2019)
- Angola: 6,295 (2020)
- Malawi: 6,054 (2020)
- France: 5,925 (2020)
- Italy: 5,834 (2020)
- Botswana: 5,733 (2020)
- Cyprus: 4,937 (2020)
- Lesotho: 4,782 (2020)
- Spain: 4,303 (2022)
- Sweden: 4,263 (2022)
- Belgium: 4,176 (2020)
- Brazil: 3,812 (2025)
- Zambia: 3,788 (2020)

Languages
- Afrikaans, English, Ndebele, Sepedi Sotho, Tswana, South African Sign Language, Swazi, Tshivenda, Xhosa, Xitsonga, Zulu, Swahili, Gujarati, Tamil, Telugu

Religion
- Hinduism, Buddhism, Christianity, Judaism, Jainism, Islam, Animism, Zulu religion

Related ethnic groups
- Sri Lankans, Mauritians, Ethiopians, Indians, Fijians

The South African diaspora consists of South African emigrants and their descendants living outside South Africa. The largest concentrations of South African emigrants are to be found in the United Kingdom, Australia, the United States, and the United Arab Emirates. At the time of the 2021 United Kingdom census, 217,180 residents of England and Wales were born in South Africa. In Australia, there were 189,207 South African-born people living in the country at the moment of the 2021 Census. The 2021 American Community Survey identified 123,461 South African-born residents of the country.

According to the data compiled by Statistics South Africa, between 2006 and 2016 the most popular overseas destinations for South African émigrés were: 1. Australia (26.0%), 2. United Kingdom (25.0%), 3. United States (13.4%), 4. New Zealand (9.5%), 5. Germany (6.0%), 6. American Samoa (United States territory) (4.4%), 7. United Arab Emirates (4.2%), 8. Cuba (4.0%), 9. Canada (3.0%), and 10. China (2.0%).

A number of White South Africans, most of them skilled, left the country in the years preceding and following the 1994 election that represented the end of the Apartheid era. As a result, the diaspora mainly consists of white South African emigrants of British, Jewish (mostly via Latvian, German and Lithuanian ancestry) and to a lesser extent, Afrikaner origin. A minority of English South Africans have moved to the United Kingdom (often through the UK ancestry visa), due to socioeconomic concerns such as South Africa's high crime rate in the 1990s and early 2000s, a volatile South African Rand, economic mismanagement and changes in the South African economy. More recently, over 128,000 people emigrated from South Africa between 2015 and 2020, more than three times as many as between 2010 and 2015 (43,000 people).

Afrikaners and Black South Africans generally have much lower emigration rates than their English South African counterparts. In 2022, the most popular destinations for emigrating South Africans were the United Kingdom, Australia, Portugal, Canada and Mauritius.

== See also ==
- Zimbabwean diaspora
- South Africans in the United Kingdom
- South African Americans
- South African Canadians
- South African Australians
