= Zimbabwean Canadians =

Canadian citizens of Zimbabwean descent or Zimbabwe-born persons who reside in Canada

Total population
- by ancestry, 2016: 16,225
- by birth, 2016: 15,000

Regions with significant populations
- Vancouver, Toronto, Calgary, Ottawa, Southern Ontario, Montreal, Edmonton, St. John's, NL

Languages
- English; Shona; Ndebele

Religion
- Christianity; Judaism; others

Zimbabwean Canadians are Canadian citizens of Zimbabwean descent or a Zimbabwe-born person who resides in Canada. According to the 2016 Canadian census there were 16,225 Canadian citizens who claimed Zimbabwean ancestry and 15,000 Zimbabwean citizens residing in the country at the moment of the census.

In 2010, Southern African Migration Programme conducted a survey across Canada about Zimbabwean migration; this was the first major study of Zimbabwean Canadians. According to SAMP, the movement of Zimbabwean migrants into Canada started in 1980 after Zimbabwe gained independence, but a large influx of Zimbabweans started in the 2000s when inflation, poverty, and political oppression exponentially grew in Zimbabwe; the peak year was in 2004 when 1,456 Zimbabweans became permanent residents. In the 2006 Canadian census, there were 8,040 Zimbabwe-born people in Canada, compromising 6,525 permanent residents and 1,515 students or temporary workers.

== Features ==
Ontario is the most popular destination for Zimbabweans, home to approximately 60% of all immigrants. Other leading provinces include Alberta (13% total), British Columbia (12%), and Quebec (10% total). Toronto is the most popular destination for recent arrivals from Zimbabwe followed by Southern Ontario, Calgary, Ottawa and Vancouver.

== Brain drain ==
Zimbabweans in Canada are generally high-skilled, educated, professionals who have migrated to Canada for better opportunities. According to Sinclair, this presents a problem because Zimbabwe has invested substantial amounts of scarce public funds in individuals' education and training, but do not receive "return" on the investment since the individual does not work in the country. This hurts Zimbabwe's economic development and can stunt its GDP. Therefore, Canada does not have to pay for any of the education costs for these educated immigrants and they benefit while Zimbabwe struggles.

== Zimbabwean policy ==
The Government of Zimbabwe is in the process of developing the National Diaspora Policy which "seeks to provide a comprehensive framework for harnessing the contribution of Zimbabwean diaspora as well as the protection of the Zimbabweans outside the country." The Ministry of Macro Economic Planning and the Investment Promotion is leading the development of the policy.

In 2014 diaspora Zimbabweans sent remittances valuing over US$1.8 billion; which account for 15% of Zimbabwe's GDP at the time. There is a growing recognition that "diaspora resources can be leveraged to facilitate increased trade, investment, technology, skills, and cultural linkage between different countries." As well, policy can also help realize the potential of the diaspora by facilitating the transfer of diaspora resources and mobility, and enhance social inclusion and integration of communities to allow diaspora members reach their full potential.

== Canada's immigration policy ==
Canada determines whether to allow an immigrant to come into the country based on three main categories: economic, family reunification, and refugee status for a person. The economic category represents the largest portion of immigrants each year. Canada has point system to decide whether an immigrant is chosen to enter, and applicants are rewarded with points if they received higher education, job experience, and have a high skill level with languages. Economic development is important to a country, therefore Canada values skilled immigrants. Family reunification of immigrants including spouses, children, and extended family in Canada is also considered for an applicant's entry; this is the second- largest group of immigrants admitted on a yearly basis. Thirdly, refugees admitted into Canada represent the smallest group of immigrants every year; this category includes humanitarian resettlement programs and claims for asylum protection. "Between 1990 and 2002, 49% of immigrants to Canada were from the economic class, 34% were from the family reunification category, and 13% were humanitarian cases." Canada provides language training, as well as national health care and social welfare to immigrants, which helps them settle into the new country.

== Settlement in Ontario ==
Many Zimbabwean immigrants have been drawn to the province of Ontario, particularly the Greater Toronto Area and Southern Ontario, forming an emerging and stable Zimbabwean Canadian community; however, it is often overlooked due to the presence of much larger immigrant groups from India, China and the Caribbean. Many of these immigrants from Zimbabwe, especially those without family or relatives in the United Kingdom, find it easier to immigrate to Canada. A notable number of also enter Canada as students with Queen's University at Kingston, Ryerson University and the University of Toronto, popular with students and graduates from Zimbabwe.

Most immigrants are also generally middle class and well educated but, unlike in the UK or Australia, they seem to have few links to South African Canadians. This is probably due to the situation in Zimbabwe creating a greater need to emigrate than in South Africa, or a desire by many immigrants to live individually rather than in large groups. The Greater Toronto Area offers comfortable affordable living and a suburban lifestyle that most immigrants were accustomed to prior to arriving in Canada, compared to a country like the UK. In addition, the relatively high levels of education, income, English usage and emphasis on education in Zimbabwean culture has place them at an advantage compared to other recent migrants to Canada.

== Zimbabwean American visitors ==
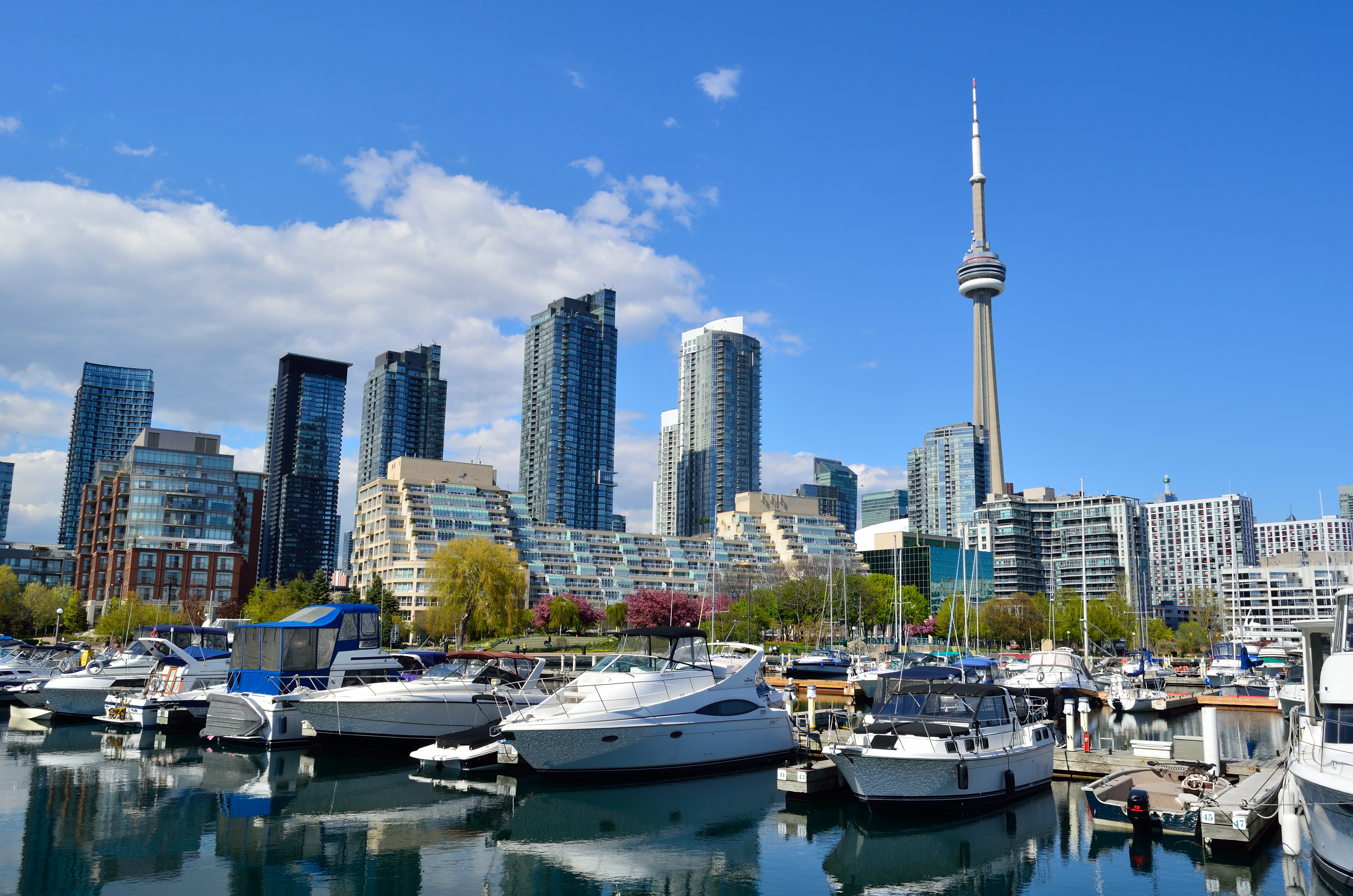
Greater Toronto has emerged as a hub for Zimbabwean immigrants

A recent trend in Toronto, and Ontario more generally, attracting a significant number of Zimbabwean American visitors from the US. Toronto is considered the main gateway to Canada and is within driving distance of the Canada–United States border creating opportunities for both settled Canadian and American communities to interact.

The US overall has a larger and more established Zimbabwean population than Canada, but its residents are spread out over multiple cities and states and not as highly concentrated in one area as those in the Greater Toronto Area. In addition, a number of Zimbabweans, such as students and asylum seekers have moved to Canada after struggling to permanently settle in the US. This has made Ontario into a growing hub for Zimbabweans in North America

Increasingly, many US residents now have family north of the border. Despite often long wait times at the Canada–United States border customs, it is still worth a trip up to the Toronto area to visit friends and family, for cheaper education and healthcare, and for food and commercial products from Zimbabwe and Southern Africa, especially for those living in the Midwestern states. Many Zimbabwean Americans from the Midwest and to lesser extent immigrant hubs on the east coast such as New York City, Washington, DC and Philadelphia also have business, social connections and family ties to Zimbabwean Canadian families in Ontario. University and college students of Zimbabwean heritage are also attracted to studying in Canada due to its familiarity, lower costs and Commonwealth ties.

== Notable Zimbabwean Canadians ==
- Bert Amato – venture capitalist, investor and consultant
- Charmaine – rapper
- Alex Glegg – cricket player for the Canadian national team
- Liam Middleton – rugby coach for the Zimbabwean and the Canadian national rugby team
- Anthony Gubbay – retired Chief Justice for the Supreme Court of Zimbabwe.
- Cleopas Ncube – wrestler for Team Canada
- Raza-ur-Rehman – cricket player for the Canadian national team
- Barbara Mamabolo – singer and actress
- Issey Nakajima-Farran – former Toronto FC soccer player
- Paris Nakajima-Farran – professional soccer player
- Kwasi Songui – Canadian actor
- Yvonne Vera – author, artist and academic

== See also ==
- Zimbabwean British
- Zimbabwean Australians
- South African Canadians
