= South Africans in the United Kingdom =

Citizens and residents of the United Kingdom with origins in South Africa

- Distribution by regional area at the 2011 census

Total population
- South Africa-born residents in the United Kingdom: 235,060 – 0.4% (2021/22 Census) (Note: Does not include South Africans born in the United Kingdom or those with ancestry rooted in South Africa); England: 211,447– 0.4% (2021); Scotland: 15,253 – 0.3% (2022); Wales: 5,733 – 0.2% (2021); Northern Ireland: 2,627 – 0.1% (2021); South African citizens/passports held: 50,407 (England and Wales only, 2021); Ethnic South Africans: South Africans in White ethnic group: 57,648; South Africans in Black ethnic group: 7,922; South Africans in Mixed ethnic group: 1,620 (England and Wales only, 2021)

Regions with significant populations
- London, South East England

Languages
- English (British, South African), Afrikaans

Religion
- Predominantly: Christianity (Anglicanism · Calvinism · Methodism) Minority: Judaism, Traditional African religion, Irreligion

Related ethnic groups
- Zimbabwean British, Afrikaners, British diaspora in Africa, South African American

South Africans in the United Kingdom include citizens and residents of the United Kingdom with origins in South Africa.

== Demographics ==
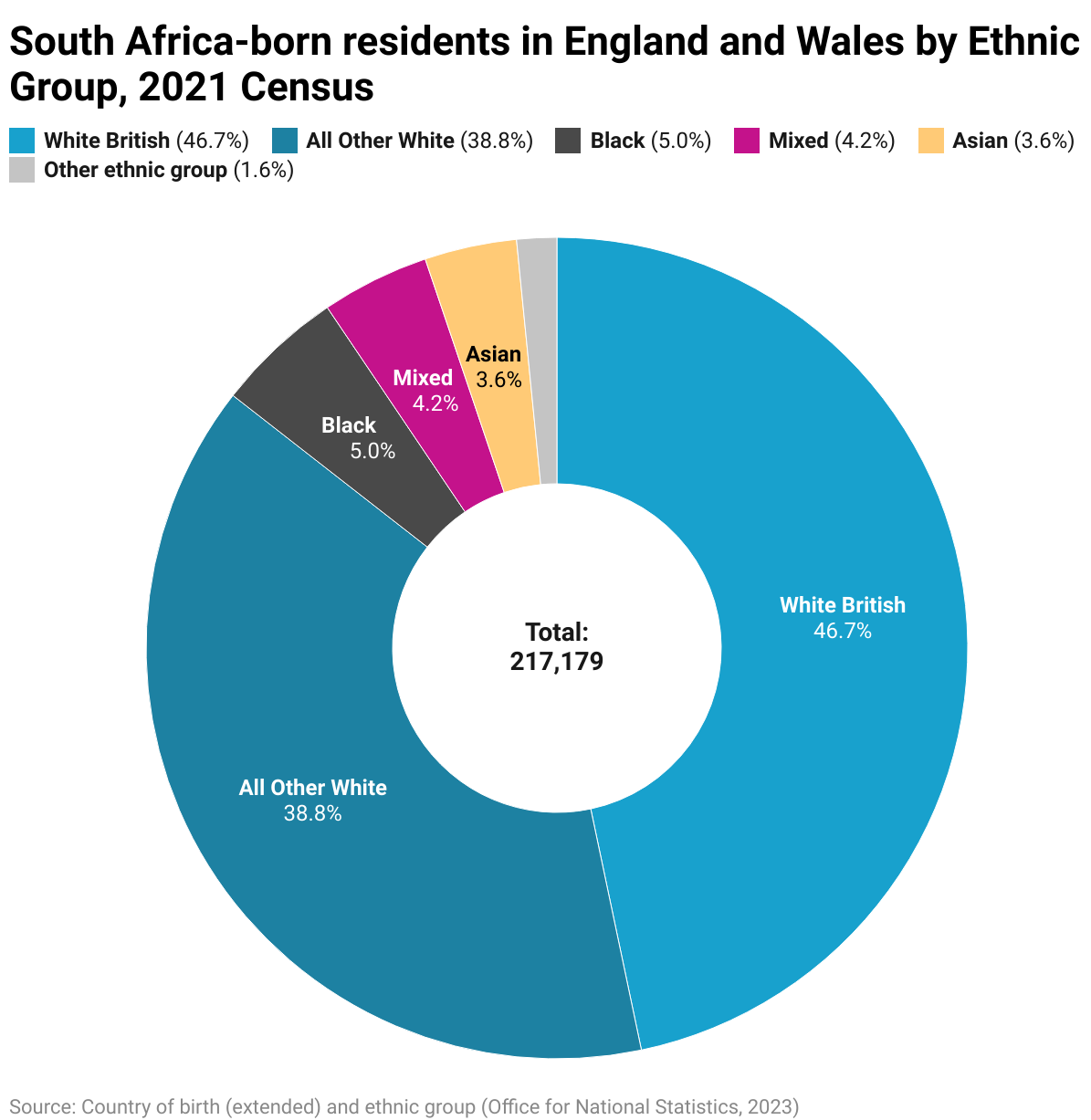
South Africa-born residents by ethnic group (2021 census, England and Wales)

According to the 2011 UK census, 186,355 South African-born people were resident in England, 10,607 in Scotland, 4,668 in Wales and 1,847 in Northern Ireland. The 2021 UK census recorded 211,447 South African-born people residing in England, 15,253 in Scotland, 5,733 in Wales, and 2,627 in Northern Ireland.

Unlike the country of South Africa itself, the majority of the South African diaspora living in the United Kingdom are White South Africans. Of all people identifying as South African in England and Wales, 86% identify as white, while 12% identify as black and 2% as mixed. According to the 2021 Census, the majority of South African born people in the UK live in Surrey and South West London, particularly in Putney, Wimbledon, Elmbridge, Woking, Sutton and Merton.

== Notable South Africans in the United Kingdom ==
This list includes those who were born in South Africa and those who were born in another country but primarily raised in South Africa.

South African born British people have contributed heavily in sports, especially in Commonwealth sports such as Cricket and Rugby. 17 South African born players have played for the England national cricket team and over a dozen have played for both the England and Scotland national Rugby Union teams collectively.

Name	Occupation
Alex Bell	Scotland Footballer with 1 cap in 1912
Allan Lamb	England Cricketer between 1982 and 1992
Amanda Craig	novelist
Andrew Feinstein	former politician
Andrew Surman	England U-21 Footballer with 4 caps and 1 goal between 2007 and 2008
Andrew Strauss	England Cricketer between 2003 and 2012
Angelique Rockas	British Actress, Producer and Activist
Antony Sher	British Actor
Basil D'Oliveira	England Cricketer between 1966 and 1972
Belle Delphine	Pornographic actress, Internet personality.
Beth Tweddle	British Gymnast, three time world champion and Olympic bronze medalist
Bill Perry	England Footballer with 3 caps and 2 goals between 1955 and 1956
Brad Barritt	England and British and Irish Lion Rugby Union Player with 26 appearances between 2012 and 2015
Sir Bradley Fried	British businessman, ex-chair of the Court of Directors of the Bank of England, chair of Goldman Sachs International
Bob Holness	British Quiz Show Host
Brian Stein	England Footballer with 1 cap in 1984
Cameron Norrie	British Tennis Player and former world number 66
Caspar Lee	British YouTuber and Vlogger with 7.5 million+ subscribers (Born in UK but raised in South Africa)
Ciara Charteris	producer and former actress
Chris Froome	British cyclist, 7 time grand tour winner and Olympic bronze medallist
Chris Smith	England Cricketer between 1983 and 1986
Chumisa Dornford-May	musical theatre actress (daughter of Mark Dornford-May and Pauline Malefane)
Cleve September	musical theatre actor
Colin Viljoen	England Footballer with 2 caps in 1975
Craig Kieswetter	England Cricketer between 2010 and 2013
David Ribbans	England Rugby Union player
Deborah Levy	novelist
Doreen Mantle	British Actress
Elize du Toit	British Actress
Eric Abraham	producer and former journalist
Frances Rivett-Carnac	British sailor, Olympic gold medalist
Frank Osborne	England Footballer with 4 caps and 3 goals between 1922 and 1926
Gordon Hodgson	England Footballer with 3 caps and 1 goal between 1930 and 1931, 241 goals for Liverpool FC
Ian Greig	England Cricketer in 1982
Jaco van Gass	British Paralympic Cyclist, Paralympic Champion
Jade Dernbach	England Cricketer between 2011 and 2014
Jason Roy	England Cricketer from 2014
Jenny Runacre	British actress
Johan Steyn	Judge and peer
John Hewie	Scotland Footballer with 19 caps and 2 goals between 1956 and 1960
Jonathan Trott	England Cricketer between 2007 and 2015
J. R. R. Tolkien	British Author of The Hobbit and The Lord of the Rings and World War 1 veteran
Justin Rose	English Golfer, Major winner, Olympic champion and former world number one
Justine Waddell	British producer and former actress
Keaton Jennings	England Cricketer from 2016
Keri-anne Payne	British Swimmer, two time world champion and Olympic silver medalist
Kevin Pietersen	England Cricketer between 2004 and 2014
Kyle Edmund	British Tennis Player and world number 14
Lillian Board	British middle-distance runner and Olympic silver medalist
Lizelle Bisschoff	Film theorist, academic, curator and the founder of the Africa in Motion film festival in Scotland
Mark Shuttleworth	British Millionaire
Michael Lumb	England Cricketer between 2010 and 2014
Mike Catt	England Rugby Union player, 2003 World Cup winner
Matt Prior	England Cricketer between 2004 and 2014
Neil Broad	British tennis player, former British number one and Olympic silver medalist
Natalie Steward	British swimmer, Olympic silver and bronze medalist
Nicky Hambleton-Jones	British Television Presenter
Oti Mabuse	dancer
Peter Hain	British Politician
Prue Leith	restaurateur and television personality
Quintin Brand	Second World War Royal Air Force Officer
Reg Osborne	England Footballer with 1 cap in 1927
Richard Mason	novelist
Robin Smith	England Cricketer between 1988 and 1996
Ronald Harwood	British Playwright
Rupert Obholzer	British rower and Olympic bronze medalist
Sid James	British Actor
Sir Sidney Kentridge	British lawyer who played a leading role in a number of the most significant political trials in Apartheid South Africa
Simon Lessing	British triathlete
Stuart Abbott	England Rugby Union player, 2003 World Cup winner
Stuart Meaker	England Cricketer between 2011 and 2012
Teignmouth Melvill	British polo player, Olympic gold medalist
Tom Curran	England Cricketer from 2017
Tony Greig	England Cricketer between 1972 and 1977
Vanessa Zachos	actress
William Rawson	England Footballer with 2 appearances between 1875 and 1877
Zola Budd	British distance runner and Olympian

== British people of South African ancestry ==
Name	Occupation	Link
Christian Bale	actor	South African father
Ben Barnes	actor	South African mother
Kegs Chauke	footballer	South African parents
Joan Collins	actress, author and columnist	South African father
Jackie Collins	novelist	South African father
Emma Corrin	actress	South African mother
Hector Janse van Rensburg	painter and cartoonist	South African father
Asanda Jezile	singer	South African parents
Natasha Kaplinsky	news presenter	South African father of Polish descent
Andrew Lincoln	actor, director	South African mother
Gugu Mbatha-Raw	actress	South African father
Sienna Miller	actress, model, and fashion designer	South African mother
Sem Moema	politician	South African parents
James Musa	Footballer	South African parents
Malachi Napa	footballer	South African mother
Daniel Radcliffe	actor	South African mother
Anna Shaffer	actress	South African parents
Dan Smith	singer	South African parents
Savannah Steyn	actress	South African descent
David Suchet	actor	South African father
Ellora Torchia	actress	South African mother
Hannah van der Westhuysen	actress	South African father
Andy Zaltzman	comedian, radio personality	South African father

== See also ==
- South Africa–United Kingdom relations
- South African diaspora
- Immigration to the United Kingdom
- British diaspora in Africa
