= South African Canadians =

Total population
- 51,590 (2021)

Regions with significant populations
- Toronto, Vancouver, Calgary, Edmonton, Hamilton, Ottawa

Languages
- Afrikaans; English; French

Religion
- Christianity; Judaism

Related ethnic groups
- Zimbabwean Canadians, Australian Canadians

South African Canadians are Canadians of South African descent. Most South African Canadians are White South Africans, mostly of British and Afrikaner ancestry. According to the 2021 Canada census there were 51,590 South African-born immigrants in Canada. It includes those who hold or have ever held permanent resident status in Canada, including naturalized citizens. 12,270 people considered Afrikaans their mother tongue.

== Demographics ==
South African-born population in Canada by year:

Year	Number	▲ / ▼
1921	1,760	Steady
1931	2,235	▲27.0%
2001	34,990	▲1.465%
2006	38,305	▲9.5%
2011	40,550	▲5.9%
2016	44,660	▲10.1%
2021	51,590	▲15.5%

South African-born immigrants by province and territory as recorded in the 2021 Canada Census:

Total South African Born Population
Province or Territory	Total	% of total
Canada	51,590	100%
Ontario	21,540	41.7%
British Columbia	15,380	29.9%
Alberta	8,965	17.4%
Saskatchewan	2,075	4.0%
Manitoba	1,180	2.2%
Quebec	1,020	1.9%
Nova Scotia	710	1.4%
New Brunswick	300	0.6%
Newfoundland and Labrador	185	0.4%
Prince Edward Island	120	0.2%
Northwest Territories	90	0.2%
Yukon	15	0.1%
Nunavut	10	0.0%

== Notable South African Canadians ==
- Luca Bellisomo, soccer player
- Ngaire Blankenberg, former director of the National Museum of African Art
- Neill Blomkamp, film director, film producer, screenwriter, and animator
- Mike Botha, master diamond cutter
- Chris Boushy, lacrosse player
- Kim Brunhuber, journalist
- Arlene Dickinson, businesswoman
- Robin Esrock, travel writer
- Kevin Harmse, soccer player
- Mpho Koaho, actor
- Shannon Kook, actor
- Jay Manuel, director creative and make-up artist
- Kandyse McClure, actress
- Thamela Mpumlwana, actor
- Derek Muller, science communicator, film-maker and television personality, also known by YouTube channel Veritasium
- Joyce Murray, politician
- Elon Musk, business magnate, investor, engineer and inventor
- Steve Nash, basketball player
- Lisa de Nikolits, writer
- Johannes Sauer, sport shooter
- Tony Dean Smith, film and television director, screenwriter, and editor
- D. T. H. van der Merwe, rugby union player
- Murad Velshi, former politician in Ontario

== See also ==
- South African diaspora
- Dutch Canadians
- Canadian Immigrant population by country of birth
- Canada–South Africa relations
- South African Americans
