= Ndebele language =

Ndebele language may refer to:

- Northern Ndebele language (isiNdebele saseNyakatho) or Zimbabwean Ndebele, spoken in Zimbabwe
- Southern Ndebele language (isiNdebele seSewula) or Transvaal Ndebele, spoken in South Africa
- Sumayela Ndebele language (isiNdebele sesumayela) or Transvaal ndebele, spoken in South Africa

== See also ==
- Nguni languages, the language family to which all of the above belong
