= Masimba Musodza =

Zimbabwean author

- Born: Julius Masimba Musodza'; March 29, 1976 (age 50); Harare, Zimbabwe
- Occupations: Screenwriter, novelist, producer

Julius Masimba Musodza (born 29 March 1976) is a Zimbabwean author.

== Life ==
Musodza was born at the cusp of the emergence of the new Zimbabwe, the eldest son of a senior civil servant in the Ministry of Lands. The Musodza family are of the Buja people of Mutoko, north east Zimbabwe. Australian actress and model Faro Musodza, who plays "Iris" in the series Turn Up The Volume is his cousin (or "sister" in the Zimbabwean kinship system). Reading was encouraged in the Musodza household. He was educated at Avondale Primary School, Harare and St Mary Magdalene's High School, Nyanga. After school, he trained as a screenwriter, selling his first screenplay to Media For Development Trust in 2002. Barely a month after, as political and socio-economic uncertainty engulfed Zimbabwe, Musodza relocated to the United Kingdom, where he has lived ever since. He lives in the North East England town of Middlesbrough.

== Writing ==
An avid reader as a child, Musodza aspired to be a writer from the time he discovered that it was possible to earn a living from it. Musodza has contributed to StoryTime e-zine, which was founded by Sweden-based Zimbabwean author and publisher, Ivor Hartmann., Jungle Jim, Bookends, Winter Tales and other periodicals.

In 2013, Masimba Musodza began to publish on the now defunct JukePop Serials online platform his vampire novel, Herbert Wants To Come Home. Inspired by Bram Stoker's Dracula, and what he saw as the migration and belonging themes in it, Musodza uses the modern vampire myth to express the fears his generation of exiles have about returning to Zimbabwe and finding a place in a society that has moved on. The full novel remains unpublished to date, but an excerpt in both English and ChiShona appeared in a special edition of the Manchester Review

He is also the author of the first definitive science fiction novel in the Shona language, MunaHacha Maive Nei? Musodza states that he began to write science-fiction in ChiShona when he was 10, when he translated Mary Shelley's Frankenstein for his maternal grandmother. His use of ChiShona challenges the widely-held perception that indigenous languages lack the "sophistication" with which to conceptualise and articulate "complex" ideas such as are found in science-fiction. He has also stated that he is inspired by Ngũgĩ wa Thiong'o's Decolonising The Mind. Musodza explores writing science -fiction in ChiShona in an essay, Writing and Publishing 'Complicated Stuff' in an African Language, which appeared in Vector 289, the magazine of the British Fantasy Association He is one of two Zimbabwean writers who have been featured in Geoff Ryman's 100 African Writers of SF

A devout Rastafarian since his teens, Masimba Musodza writes the Dread Eye Detective Agency series of novels and stories, which revolve around a sibling pair of private investigators, Chenai "Ce-Ce" Chisango and her brother, Farai, operating out of Chitungwiza. The first novel, Uriah's Vengeance, appeared in 2009. Since then, Musodza has focused on single stories in various magazines, and also as single ebooks.

In addition to two personal blogs, Musodza, an advocate for Zionism, blogs for The Times of Israel. He has taken part in the Battle for Ideas Festival

== Novels and novellas ==
- Aquilina (kana kuti, Reuriro yaHatifari Maforimbo), 2020, Belontos Books, ISBN 978-1-9997077-4-3, translated into English as Aquilina (or, The Confession Of Hatifari Maforimbo) ISBN 978-1-914287855, 2024, Carnelian Heart Publishing, United Kingdom
- Shavi Rechikadzi, 2015, Belontos Books, ISBN 978-1-908690-24-1
- MunaHacha Maive Nei? (2nd edition), 2016, Belontos Books, ISBN 978-1-908690-24-1
- Uriah's Vengeance, Lion Press, 2009, Coventry, United Kingdom ISBN 978-0-9558082-5-8

== Short Stories Collections ==
- Speaking For Melos, 2026, Carnelian Heart Publishing, ISBN 978-1918606-07-2

== Short fiction ==
- Perfect Strangers, Brittle Paper, 12 October 2026, United States/online
- Moon Bound, Teoría Ómicron, Año 8 – Número 3, 10 October, 2026, Ecuador
- Rastafarianul Gunoaielor (Romanian "The Junkyard Rastaman"), Revista Online SFF Galaxia 42, Romania, July 2026
- OtherCam, Bloodclot!Zine, Issue 2, Canada, July 2026
- The Shame Eater, Small World City, Issue 11, Bangladesh, June 2026
- The Usual Suspects, African Writer Magazine, Nigeria/online, March 2026
- Our Soil, Afrofuturism Short Stories, Flame Tree Press, United Kingdom, 2025
- Out Of The Frying Pan, Bluebell Literary Magazine Issue 1, University of East Anglia - Creative Writing Master’s Programme, United Kingdom, June 2025
- Somebody Is Going Get Hurt, EgoPhobia Magazine, Romania/online, September 2025
- The Meek, Savage Planets Magazine, United Kingdom, April 2025
- Cousin/Sister Modesta's Halloween Pumpkins, Halloweenthology-Witches' Brew, Wicked Press, India, 2024
- Highly Civlised Men, the other side of hope, Volume 3, Issue 2, United Kingdom, Winter 2023.
- The Head Gardner, Skobeloff Horror & Ghost Stories Anthology, Skobeloff Publishing, United Kingdom, October 2023
- Ask The Beasts, Omenana Speculative Fiction Magazine, Vol. 26, Seven Hills Media, Nigeria/online, July 2023
- Running Out, African Writer Magazine, Nigeria/online, July 2023
- Black Tax, Agbowo, Issue 6, November 2022, Y, Nigeria, 2022, translated into Igbo by Yvonna Chioma Mbanefo as Ụtụ Ojii, Olonga Africa Anthology, Nigeria, 2023
- Ronak's Shame, Lolwe Literary Magazine, Nairobi, Kenya, 2022
- The Sandship Builders Of Chitungwiza, Save The World: Twenty Sci-Fi Writers Save The Planet, ed. J.Scott Coatsworth, Other Worlds Ink, United States, 2022
- Here I Am, My Son, Sticks & Stones Magazine, Bright Lights Media House, United Kingdom, 2022, reprinted on the Saraba Magazine website
- Warrior Mine, Omenana Speculative Fiction Magazine, Vol. 19, Seven Hills Media, Nigeria, 2021
- Tek-Tek's Game, Other Side of Hope Vol 1, Other Side Of Hope Publishing, United Kingdom, 2021
- What Bastet Saw, Undead Press, online, 2021
- Imba YaSekuru Browne, Mosi-oa-Tunya Literary Review, Zimbabwe, 2021
- The Rapture of Pastor Agregate Makunike, Chitungwiza Musha Mukuru: An Anthology From Zimbabwe's Biggest Ghetto Town, Mwanaka Publishing, Chitungwiza, Zimbabwe, 2020
- Aquilina (kana kuti, Reururo yaHatifari Maforimbo, Belontos Books, United Kingdom, 2019, ISBN 978-1999707743
- The Witch of Eskale Hall, "Creep" anthology, ed. Jay Chakravarti, Culture Cult Magazine, India, 2019, ISBN 978-1073442454
- The Interplanetary Water Company, AfroSFv3, 2018, StoryTime, ISBN 978-9198291339
- African Roar (Anthology, contributed Yesterday's Dog, a short-story) edited by E. Sigauke/I.W. Hartmann, Lion Press, 2010, ISBN 978-0-9562422-8-0
- Here be Cannibals, Jungle Jim #23, Afreak Press, Cape Town, Republic of South Africa,2014
- When the Trees were Enchanted, Winter Tales, Fox Spirit Books, London, United Kingdom, 2014ISBN 978-1-909348-88-2
- Chishamiso, Bookends, The Sunday Observer, Kingston, Jamaica, 2012
- To The Woods, With A Girl, StoryTime e-zine, Sweden
- In The Blood, StoryTime e-zine, Sweden, 2008
- Framed, StoryTime e-zine, Sweden, 2008
- The Village Idiot, Trends, Bulawayo, 2006

== Critical reception ==
Musodza was listed in Geoff Ryman's 100 African Writers Of Speculative Fiction. His literary works have been examined by several academics, mostly as part of the African Speculative Fiction corpus, such as Alena Rettova, Maria Prozesky, Joanna Woods and also as literature by Zimbabwean writers living abroad.

An unpublished short story, The Salt Of The Earth, was shortlisted in the second History Of The Future International Literary Award, Best Short Story in Foreign Language category,

The story collection, Speaking For Melos, was listed by Middlesbrough Libraries Reader-in-Residence Debbie Rolls as part of her Read Local Authors campaign.

The Interplanetary Water Company was Longlisted in the Nommo Awards, Short Story category, 2019,

When The Trees Were Enchanted was Longlisted in the inaugural African Speculative Fiction Society's Nommo Awards, Short Story category, 2017

In 2016, Masimba Musodza was listed among the 10 Best Writers From Zimbabwe by Culture Trip.

== Acting ==
Masimba Musodza's professional acting debut was in Edgar Langeveldt's play, No News, which premiered at Theatre-In-The-Park, Harare, in 1997. He also appears in a short film, Vengeance is Mine (2001) by Tawanda Gunda. However, it was not until he settled in Middlesbrough that he began to pursue acting more seriously. He appeared in a short play, To Be Or Not To Be, written by compatriot Dictator Maphosa, as part of the Middlesbrough Council-sponsored Boro Bites short plays (August, 2010). In 2011, he joined the Arc Sketch Group, an extension of the Writers Block North East workshops, which put on themed sketch shows at the Arc Theatre, Stockton-on-Tees until it disbanded in 2012.

Since then, Masimba Musodza has been a film and TV extra, appearing in such productions as Beowulf: Return to the Shieldlands (Episode 11), where he plays a Vani warrior. He can also be seen in the festival teaser and UK trailer for Ken Loach's I, Daniel Blake. He has also appeared in Make! Craft Britain, which was aired on BBC4 on June 9, 2016. His most recent appearance has been in the short film I Need help (Ben Stainsby, 2018), where he plays 'The Wise Man'
