= John Collins (British businessman) =

British business executive (born 1941)

Sir Sir John Alexander Collins
- Born: December 10, 1941 (age 84); Southern Rhodesia
- Education: Campbell College, Belfast
- Alma mater: University of Reading; University of Strathclyde (honorary)
- Occupation: Business executive
- Known for: Chief Executive of Shell UK (1990–1993); Chairman of National Power (1998–2000); Director at Dixons Retail (2001–2009)
- Awards: Knight Bachelor (1993)

Sir John Alexander Collins (born 10 December 1941) is a British business executive and director for several corporations. He was born in Southern Rhodesia and after attending Campbell College in Belfast, he graduated from the University of Reading in England in 1964 and received an honorary degree from the University of Strathclyde in 1994.

He worked for the Shell Group for nearly thirty years, starting their Agribusiness in Africa and rising to be the Chief Executive for Shell, UK, from 1990 to 1993. Since then he has held a number of positions, including the chairman of the UK's National Power from 1998 to 2000. He worked for Dixons Retail (comprising Dixons, Currys, PC World, PC City, The Link, Fotovista, and Pixmania) from 2001 to 2009.

He was knighted in 1993.
