= Jabulani Dhliwayo =

Zimbabwean businessman (born 1960)

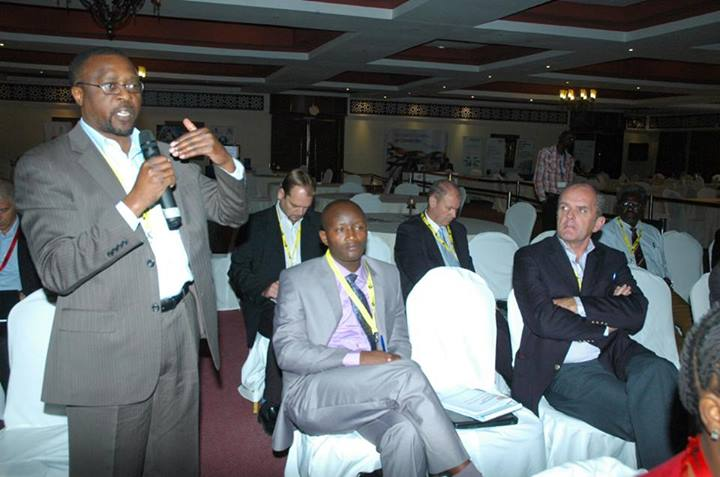
- Dhliwayo addressing a summit in Tanzania
- Born: 15 April 1960 (age 66); Harare, Zimbabwe
- Education: University of Kent
- Spouse: Nyaradzo Mafolo Dhliwayo
- Children: 2
- Awards: Black Engineer of the Year Special Recognition, (2004)
- Scientific career
- Fields: Physics, optical physics, optical fiber, giber sensors, marketing
- Workplaces: Corning, Inc.

Jabulani Dhliwayo (born 15 April 1960) is an ICT expert and the founder of ICT Africa. He is a strong advocate for the use of ICT as a vehicle for sustained economic development in Africa. He has travelled to more than twenty African countries providing training and support for fiber optic infrastructure development. Jabulani is a contributing author for "Open Access for Africa: Challenges, Recommendations and Examples" and the author of "The Endless Journey: From a liberation struggle to driving emerging technologies in Africa".

== Education ==
Jabulani Dhliwayo attended primary and central primary school at the United Church of Christ mission school at Mt. Silinda. As a result of disruptions due to the armed struggle in Rhodesia, Jabulani had to study at Jersey Secondary school in Zimbabwe, in camps in Mozambique and at Ahmadiyya High School in Sierra Leone before he could complete high school. He later graduated with a B.Sc. Education from the University of Sierra Leone, an M.Sc. in physics from Laurentian University in Canada and a PhD in physics from the University of Kent in the UK.

== Career ==
In 1975, Jabulani Dhliwayo went to Mozambique to join the ZANLA revolutionary movement led by President Robert Mugabe to fight the racist regime of Ian Smith in Rhodesia. He was later sent to Sierra Leone for further studies by the organization's secretary for education, Dzingai Mutumbuka.

After Zimbabwe's independence, Jabulani went back to Zimbabwe where he took up teaching positions at Chindunduma High School and Harare Polytechnic.

After completing his PhD, Jabulani Dhliwayo took up engineering, scientist and management positions at Ando Corporation in Maryland, USA, and at Corning Incorporated in New York, USA, before establishing ICT Africa. As a scientist, Jabulani developed novel measurement systems for photonics and fiber optics.

He also joined NEPAD Council in 2004 and was among a group of the organization's leaders invited to Maputo, Mozambique, to brief the NEPAD Heads of State and Government Implementation Committee on the council's vision for the development of the African continent.
