= Mati Hlatshwayo Davis =

Infectious diseases physician and public health expert

Mati Hlatshwayo Davis (Matifadza Hlatshwayo)
- Born: 1982 (age 43–44); Harare
- Education: Case Western Reserve University; Drury University
- Scientific career
- Workplaces: John Cochran VA Medical Center; Washington University in St. Louis

Matifadza (Mati) Hlatshwayo Davis (born 1982) is a Zimbabwean-born, American-based physician and public health expert in Missouri. Her subspecialty is infectious diseases, with a focus on community engagement addressing health disparities amongst people from historically marginalized groups. She serves as the director of health for the City of St. Louis Department of Health.

== Early life and education ==
Hlatshwayo Davis was born in Harare, Zimbabwe, to mother Macyline Mubika Cannon and father Gaylord Themba Hlatshwayo. She was an undergraduate student at Drury University, where she majored in chemistry and biology with Honors. Hlatshwayo Davis studied medicine at the Case Western Reserve University School of Medicine. While there she also earned a Master of Public Health. After completing her residency in internal medicine at University Hospitals Cleveland Medical Center, Hlatshwayo Davis did an infectious diseases fellowship at the Washington University School of Medicine. She specialized in the care of people living with HIV and sexually transmitted infections.

She is married to husband Dr. Jesse Davis, a neonatal hospitalist at Children’s Hospital in St. Louis, Missouri. They have two children.

== Career ==
Hlatshwayo Davis was appointed to the faculty at the Washington University School of Medicine from 2019 to 2021. During that time she was also appointed to the leadership of the Office of Diversity and Inclusion, where she created policy that looked to address bias amongst patients and medical practitioners.

Hlatshwayo Davis also served as the lead HIV clinician, graduate medical education co-ordinator and outpatient parenteral antibiotic therapy supervisor at the John Cochran VA Medical Center in St. Louis during that time from 2019 to 2021.

She previously served on the steering committee and then co-chair of the Fast Track Cities, St. Louis initiative, which aims to end the HIV epidemic by 2030. The program partners with local health departments and community based organizations focused on the care of people living with HIV. In 2020, she led the launch of an HIV data dashboard that reports the proportion of people living with HIV who knew their status, had accessed treatment and had achieved viral suppression at local, regional and state levels.

Hlatshwayo Davis was appointed to the City of St. Louis Board of Health from 2020 to 2021, which oversees public health standards for the city and region. During the COVID-19 pandemic she started to focus on COVID-19 community engagement, particularly in historically marginalized groups.

She was appointed to serve as the director of health for the City of St. Louis Department of Health in October 2021. She looked to take on the COVID-19 pandemic, and other public health crises including gun violence, sexually transmitted infections and behavioral health.

Hlatshwayo Davis also serves as an associate editor for the Disparities and Culturally Competent Care section of the Real Time Learning Network, for an Infectious Diseases Society of America and CDC grant.

She is a medical contributor for a variety of news stations including CNN, BBC and Al Jazeera. She has also published opinion editorials for Newsweek.
