= Namibian Americans =

Americans of Namibian birth or descent

Namibian Americans Namibiese Amerikaners
Regions with significant populations
- United States

Languages
- English, Afrikaans, German (official languages of Namibia); Other languages spoken by Namibians, including Oshiwambo, Ovambo, Herero, and Khoekhoe

Religion
- Christianity (predominantly Lutheranism and Roman Catholicism); Traditional African religions

Related ethnic groups
- Namibians, German Namibians, South African Americans

Namibian Americans are Americans who are of Namibian ancestry or who were born in Namibia, a country located in Southern Africa. According to the National Planning Commission there were approximately 1,547 people born in Namibia living in the United States as of 2001. This number has likely increased in the years since but the United States Census Bureau does not collect data on the specific ancestry of American residents, so it is not possible to determine the total number of Namibian Americans in the United States through census data.

== Demographics ==
Namibian Americans are a small but growing community in the United States, with the largest populations found in California, Texas, and New York. Many Namibian Americans are the children or grandchildren of immigrants who have come to the United States seeking education or economic opportunities, while others are refugees who fled Namibia during times of political upheaval and conflict.

== Language ==
The official languages of Namibia are English and Afrikaans, and many Namibian Americans are fluent in both languages. In the 2000 Census, 840 Namibian Americans reported their ethnic origins. There are an estimated 28,400 Afrikaans language speakers among Namibian Americans, as recorded in 2016.
