= South African Americans =

Americans of South African birth or descent

Total population
- 139,322 (2022)

Regions with significant populations
- Greater Los Angeles, San Diego, Houston, South Florida, New York, Atlanta, Phoenix, San Francisco, Maryland, Illinois

Languages
- South African English, American English, Xhosa, Afrikaans, Zulu, Tswana, see languages of South Africa

Religion
- Roman Catholic, Reformed Churches, Jewish, Methodism, Anglicanism, minority: irreligion

Related ethnic groups
- South African Canadians; White Africans; Zimbabwean Americans; Namibian Americans; Other African immigrants to the United States

South African Americans are Americans who have full or partial ancestry from South Africa. In 2021, there were approximately 123,461 people born in South Africa who were living in the United States. There are large populations in Southern California, especially in Orange County and San Diego County, and the Miami, Florida area. Between October 2025 and March 2026, 4,499 refugees were admitted into the United States; all but three were white South Africans, with over half arriving in February and March.

== Demography ==
The majority of overseas South Africans live in the United Kingdom, Australia and New Zealand, countries with similar cultural and linguistic heritage to many South Africans, as well as similar climates and latitude positioning in the case of the latter two countries. There have also been a large number of South African immigrants who have gone to the US. Many white South Africans, both before and after the end of apartheid, emigrated to Midwestern states such as Minnesota and Illinois.

Irvine, California has a large population of South African Jews. There are numerous South Africans living in New York City and Mid-Atlantic states such as Maryland. Most South African immigrants in the US are white people of European origin. Of the 82,000 South Africans living in the US between 2008 and 2009, about 11,000 of them were Black South Africans. In the 2000 Census, 509 South African Americans reported their ethnic origins as Zulu.

The majority of these immigrants are English speaking, with a moderate proportion of these being South African Jews. In the US, South Africans in general — both white and black — live in the US individually, rather than in communities of South African Americans. The highest number of South Africans in the US live in California, notably Los Angeles County, Orange County and San Diego, while smaller populations reside in the Mid-Atlantic and the Pacific Northwest.

=== South African-born population ===
South African-born population in the US since 2015:

Year	Number
2015	94,141
2016	▲104,889
2017	▲111,720
2018	▼99,672
2019	▲111,116
2020	▼108,650
2021	▲123,461
2022	▲139,322

== Culture ==
The culture of South African Americans is a blend of their diverse ancestral backgrounds (i.e. Zulus, Xhosa, Afrikaners, Anglo-South Africans, Jews, etc.) mixed with contemporary American life. South African Americans have large, close-knit communities, particularly in Southern California (especially in Orange County and San Diego) and the Miami, Florida area. Cultural life often includes elements like braai (South African barbecue), a passion for rugby or cricket, and a deep interest in South African politics and social affairs. Though many speak English, there is often infuency in Afrikaans, Zulu, Xhosa, and other South African languages, which are maintained within households. While maintaining a distinct identity, South African Americans often assimilate well into the US mainstream, particularly those of European or urban, professional backgrounds, though they often retain a unique cultural perspective on the American experience.

The most renowned South African restaurant in the United States is the international chain Nando's Peri-Peri. In addition, there are several South African restaurants located in other major cities, including New York City and Atlanta. These establishments were primarily founded by white South Africans who relocated to these urban areas and sought to introduce their native cuisine to an American audience. The majority of these restaurants offer South African dishes, including boerewors sausage and bobotie, as well as Indian dishes such as curries and samosas.

== Organizations ==
Indaba ("discussion" in Zulu) is an example of an organization set up by South Africans to promote community involvement. It was founded in the 1990s and sponsors community events and activities. This organization allows the exchange of information through a web site and a mailing list, keeping South Africans informed about international and local events.

The South African consulate in Chicago has close ties with many expatriates and hosts regular events and speakers, including an annual celebration of Freedom Day on 27 April. In 2001, the hosts founded the African Group of the U.S. Women's Action to boost the knowledge and understanding of South Africa among Americans. The South Africans are also in many other forums, such as informal parties, religious activities and rugby matches.

== Notable people ==
- Adam Friedland, comedian
- Adam Rose, professional wrestler
- Andrew Parkinson, soccer player
- Andrew Pattison, tennis player
- Ama Qamata, actress and activist
- Angela Hawken, academic
- Arnold Vosloo, actor
- Ben Viljoen, Boer general, politician and author
- Bongokuhle Hlongwane, footballer
- Candice Swanepoel, actress, Model
- Candice Pillay, singer-songwriter
- Caron Bernstein, model and actress
- Charlize Theron, model and actress
- Cliff Drysdale, tennis player
- Colin Cowie, lifestyle guru
- Da L.E.S, hip hop artist and record producer
- Daniel Mindel, cinematographer
- Dante Polvara, footballer
- Dave Matthews, musician
- Dave Wittenberg, anime and video game voice actor
- David DeCastro, American football player
- David O. Sacks, entrepreneur
- Denise Scott Brown, architect and urban planner
- Doja Cat, singer and rapper
- Dion George, politician and conservationist
- Candice Swanepoel, Model
- Earl Sweatshirt, rapper
- Elizabeth Furse, U.S. politician
- Elon Musk, entrepreneur
- Embeth Davidtz, actress
- Gary Barber, producer
- Gavin Buckley, politician
- Goapele, rhythm & blues artist
- Gregory Alan Isakov, singer-songwriter
- Greg Joseph, American football placekicker
- Jason Lewis, state legislator
- Johan Kriek, tennis player
- Joel Pollak, political commentator
- Jonathan Butler, musician, guitarist
- Jonathan Westphal, philosopher
- Jordan Taylor, professional racing driver
- Julian Krinsky, American, former South African, professional tennis player
- Kongos brothers, musicians
- Lesley-Ann Brandt, actress
- Liezel Huber, tennis player
- Lucy Heavens and Nic Smal, creators of Kiff
- Lyndon Rive, businessman, cousin of Elon Musk
- Madelaine Petsch, actress
- Mark Mathabane, author
- Mike Connell, professional footballer
- Nana Meriwether, Miss USA 2012
- Nomzamo Mbatha, actress & UNCHR Ambassador
- Patrick Soon-Shiong, entrepreneur
- Philippe Sandler, footballer
- Philip Lloyd, professional wrestler
- Richard W. Fisher, politician and banker
- Ricky Taylor, professional racing driver
- Robert Hamerton-Kelly, theologian
- Robert Schneider, musician and producer
- Robert Z. Lawrence, economist
- Rodney Howard Browne, theologian and author
- Roy Wegerle, soccer player
- Sasha Pieterse, actress
- Selema Masekela, sports broadcaster, son of Hugh Masekela
- Sharlto Copley, actor & director
- Stelio Savante, actor
- Stephen Simpson, professional racing driver
- Styles P, rapper
- Sydney Seethal, influencer and model
- Tammin Sursok, actor, singer, composer and guitarist
- Thuso Mbedu, actress
- Trevor Denman, thoroughbred race caller
- Trevor Noah, comedian, TV host
- Trevor Rabin, musician
- Tshego, musician
- Tsiki Ntsabeleng, footballer
- Tyla, musician
- Victor Nogueira, footballer
- Zinzi Clemmons, writer
- Genevieve Morton, model

== See also ==
- South Africa–United States relations
- Southern Africans in the United States
- White South African refugee program (2025-since)
