= S.P.E. Boshoff =

South African linguist, writer, Afrikaans linguistic patriot and politician

- Stephanus Petrus Erasmus Boshoff
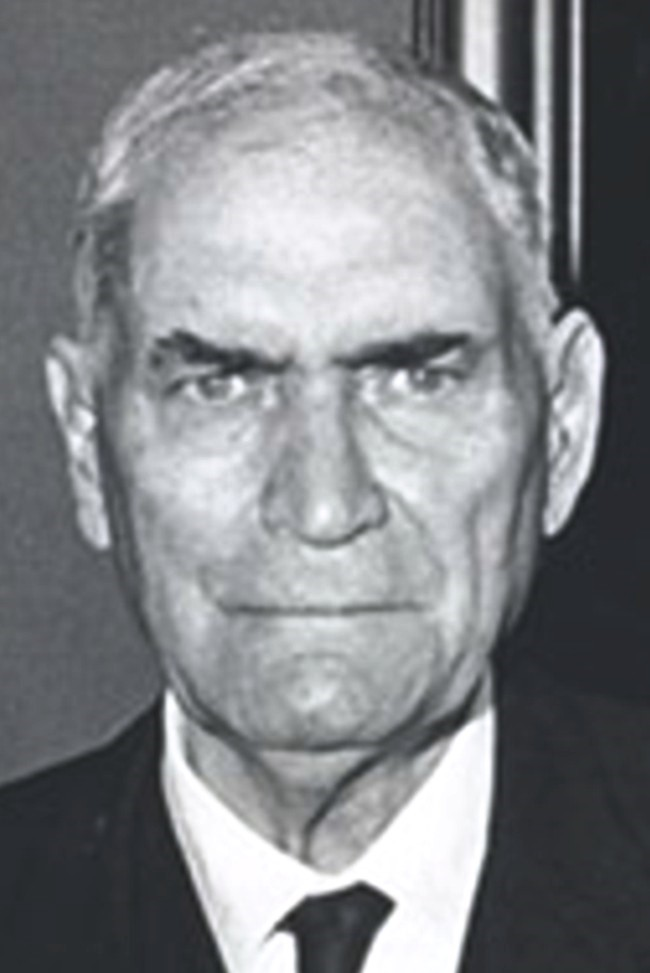
- Boshoff at an advanced age
- Born: July 14, 1891; Vaalbank, Senekal, South Africa
- Died: April 30, 1973 (aged 81); Potgietersrus, South Africa
- Citizenship: South African
- Spouse: Hester Catharina Cecilia Barnard
- Awards: Stals Prize (1959 and 1967)

Academic background
- Education: Grey University College, University of Amsterdam

Academic work
- Institutions: Teologiese Skool op Potchefstroom, North-West University

S.P.E. Boshoff (Stephanus ("Fanie") Petrus Erasmus Boshoff, 14 July 1891, Vaalbank, Senekal, South Africa – 30 April 1973, Potgietersrus, South Africa) was a South African Afrikaner linguist, writer, adapter of plays and promoter of the use of the Afrikaans language.

== Young years ==
Boshoff was born on July 14, 1891, at Senekal, Orange Free State, to Johannes Jurgens Boshoff (1847 – 1918), a Volksraad member and commander in the Second Boer War (1899–1902), and Jacoba Christina de Waal (1848 – 1919). Young Boshoff only went to school after the war when his mother had returned from a British concentration camp. He attended a primary school at Riebeek West, Cape Colony, and in 1911 graduated from Grey University College at Bloemfontein with a distinguished B.A. degree. He then taught school in Senekal (1912) and Bloemfontein (1913), while studying at Grey for an M.A. degree in English and Dutch. He left for the Netherlands to obtain a M.A. degree at the University of Amsterdam, but the outbreak of the First World War caused him to return to South Africa. There Boshoff joined the Maritz rebellion (1914 – 1915) under general C.F. Beyers (1869 – 1914), an experience he described in his 1918 book Rebellie - Sketse uit mij dagboek, 1914-1915 (Rebellion. Sketches from my diary, 1914–1915).

== Career ==
In 1915 Boshoff obtained a temporary position as a successor of professor Jan Kamp at the Teologiese Skool at Potchefstroom. Two years later he was appointed a professor of English, Dutch and History at Potchefstroom Universiteitskollege (later North-West University). In 1920, he went on leave to the Netherlands to obtain a PhD degree with his 1921 dissertation Volk en taal van Suid-Afrika, a historical description and linguistic analysis of the Afrikaans language. Returned to Potchefstroom, he was a municipal councilor and later mayor (1924 – 1926).

Boshoff was a member of the Taalkommissie (Language Committee) of the Suid-Afrikaanse Akademie vir Wetenskap en Kuns (SAAWK, South African Academy for Science and Art) from 1922 up to 1969 and with D. F. Malherbe and T.H. le Roux advised the 1933 translation of the Bible into Afrikaans, which was considered crucial to establish Afrikaans as a separate language from Dutch. In 1950 Boshoff was chosen president of the Suid-Afrikaanse Akademie and continued up to 1958.

His Etimologiese woordeboek van afrikaans (Etymological dictionary of Afrikaans) was published in 1936.

== Awards ==
His awards include the 1959 and 1967 Stals Prize for the Humanities.

== Publications ==
Boshoff published many books and articles, such as:

- 1917 – Boshoff, Stephanus Petrus Erasmus (1917). 'Vaalrivier die Broederstroom', of die uiteinde van Generaal C.F. Beyers [Vaal River the Broederstroom, or the end of General C.F. Beyers] (in Afrikaans). Bloemfontein: De Nationale Pers. OCLC 85091760.
- 1917 - Boshoff, Stephanus Petrus Erasmus (1917). Jannies, Johnnies en Jantjies (in Afrikaans). Potchefstroom: Het Westen", Drukkerij en Boekhandel. OCLC 750101855. Play.
- 1918 – Boshoff, Stephanus Petrus Erasmus (1918). Rebellie - Sketse uit mij dagboek, 1914-1915 [Rebellion. Sketches from my diary, 1914-1915] (in Afrikaans). Amsterdam, Kaapstad: J.H. De Bussy; Holl.-Afrik. Uitgevers Mij. v/h J. Dusseau & Co. OCLC 264665510.
- 1918 – Boshoff, Stephanus Petrus Erasmus; du Plessis, L.J. (1918). Afrikaanse volksliedjies [Afrikaner folk songs] (in Afrikaans). Pretoria: de Bussy. OCLC 901757084.
- 1921 – Boshoff, Stephanus Petrus Erasmus (1921). Volk en taal van Suid-Afrika [People and language of South Africa] (in Afrikaans). Kaapstad: J. Dusseau. OCLC 458650864. PhD thesis, full text online at Digital Library for Dutch Literature.
- 1927 – Boshoff, Stephanus Petrus Erasmus; Dekker, Gerrit, eds. (1927). Van Maerlant tot Boutens [From Maerlant to Boutens] (in Dutch). Pretoria: van Schaik. OCLC 252925917. Poetry anthology.
- 1936 – Boshoff, Stephanus Petrus Erasmus (1936). Beskouinge en feite [Views and facts] (in Afrikaans). Kaapstad: Nasionale Pers. OCLC 4636827. Essays.
- 1936 – Boshoff, Stephanus Petrus Erasmus (1936). Etimologiese woordeboek van afrikaans [Etymological dictionary of Afrikaans] (in Afrikaans). Kaapstad: Nasionale Pers. OCLC 13527316.
- 1955 – Boshoff, Stephanus Petrus Erasmus (1955). Afrikaanse woordelys en spelreëls : in opdrag van die Suid-Afrikaanse Akademie vir Wetenskap en Kuns [Afrikaans glossary and spelling rules: commissioned by the South African Academy of Science and Art] (in Afrikaans) (6th ed.). Kaapstad: Nasionale Boekhandel Beperk. OCLC 1038763044.
- 1963 – Boshoff, Stephanus Petrus Erasmus (1963). Mense van gister vandag en môre [People of yesterday, today, and tomorrow] (in Afrikaans). Johannesburg: Voortrekkerpers. OCLC 5846496.
- 1964 – Boshoff, Stephanus Petrus Erasmus; Kok, Benedictus; Snijman, F. J. (1964). Kruim en kors [Crumb and crust] (in Afrikaans). Johannesburg: Voortrekkerpers. OCLC 638451622.

== Literature on Boshoff ==
- Antonissen, Rob (1973). Die Afrikaanse letterkunde van aanvang tot hede (in Afrikaans) (3 ed.). Kaapstad: Nasou Beperk. ISBN 9780625001637. OCLC 1236079677.
- Nienaber, Petrus Johannes (1975). "Stephanus Petrus Erasmus Boshoff 'Vaalbank', Senekal 14 juli 1891 - Pretoria 30 april 1974". Jaarboek van de Maatschappij der Nederlandsche Letterkunde te Leiden (in Afrikaans). ISSN 0921-4895. OCLC 775987841.
