= Mariëtta Alberts =

South African linguist and terminographer

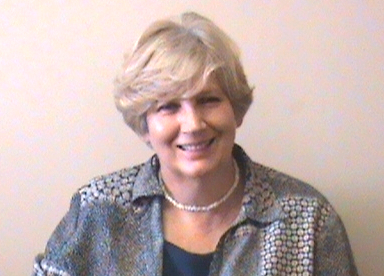
- Mariëtta Alberts
- Born: September 16, 1948 (age 77)
- Education: University of Pretoria
- Occupations: Terminologist & Terminographer
- Title: Doctor

Mariëtta Alberts (16 September 1948 – ) is a South African Afrikaans linguist, terminologist and terminographer who served for 16 years, from 1996 to 2012, on the Afrikaans Language Commission. She is well known in terminology and lexicography circles, that is, among those who compile dictionaries and terminology lists.

She is a contributing editor to the 2002 and 2009 editions (ninth and tenth editions) of the Afrikaanse Woordelys en Spelreëls.

== Biography ==
Alberts obtained the degrees B.A. (1969), B.A. (Hons) (1971), and M.A. (1983) at the University of Pretoria and a D.Litt et Phil (1991) at UNISA. She began her career in 1971 as terminologist at the Terminology Service of the Language Service Bureau, Department of National Education. She served as secretary of the Coordinating Technical Language Council (KOVAK) and was a member of LANGTAG, the language task group of the Department of Arts, Culture, Science and Technology (DACST).

She conducted research on lexicography, terminology and computational linguistics at the Human Sciences Research Council (1982–1994). AFRILEX, the African Association for Lexicography, came to be in 1995 with input from her and Prof. William Branford. Back at DACST as Head of Research Development, National Terminology Service, she drafted the bill for establishing the South African National Lexicography Units (NLUs). She acted for 23 months as Head: Terminology Division, Department of Arts and Culture (2000–2002).

In 2002 she joined the Pan South African Language Board (PanSALB) as manager of the National Lexicography Units. She visited all the NLUs across the country on a regular basis and provided training in lexicographic processes, practice, and management. In 2010 she took early retirement as Director: Terminology Development and Standardisation (PanSALB).

She remains involved in terminology projects and was co-author of the bilingual Legal Terminology Subject Dictionary: Criminal Law, Criminal Procedure and Law of Evidence (Eng/Afr – Afr/Eng) (2015), as well as the trilingual edition (Eng/Xho/Afr – Xho/Eng/Afr – Afr/Xho/Eng (2019) (SRTAT), and the Explanatory Political Dictionary (2017) (CEPTSA).

== Awards and honours ==
- As Language Commission member, co-recipient of the C.J. Langenhoven Prize for Linguistics (2003) of the South African Academy for Science and Arts (SAAWK), and the ATKV prize (2006) for compiling the Afrikaanse Woordelys en Spelreëls (AWS) 2002 edition.
- As Language Commission member, co-recipient of the C.L. Engelbrecht Prize for the 2009 edition of the AWS.
- As member of the Centre for Political and Related Terminology in Southern African Languages (CEPTSA), co-recipient of the SAAWK Stals Prize (2011) for the Nuwerwetse Politieke Woordeboek, and the SAVI Dictionary Prize (2018) and ATKV Woordveertjie (2018) for the Explanatory Political Dictionary.
- As member of the Centre for Legal Terminology in African Languages (SRTAT), co-recipient of the SAVI Dictionary Prize (2015) and ATKV Woordveertjie (2016) for Legal Terminology: Criminal Law, Criminal Procedure and Law of Evidence (2015, bilingual), and in 2020 the ATKV Woordveertjie for the trilingual (2019) edition, SRTAT in Afrikaans, English and Xhosa.
- The South African Academy for Science and Arts' Medal of Honour for the Humanities (2024).

== Books published ==
- Terminology and Terminography: Principles and Practice. A South African Perspective (2017), MLA Publications, (ISBN 978-0-9947129-0-5).
- Terminologie en Terminografie: ’n Handleiding (2019). (Afrikaans version)
