= Handwoordeboek van die Afrikaanse Taal =

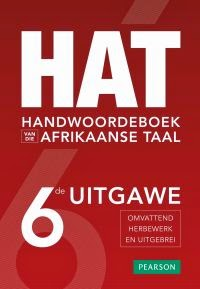
HAT 6th edition, 1st impression, 2015

The Handwoordeboek van die Afrikaanse Taal (HAT), is an explanatory dictionary for the Afrikaans language. Compared to the Woordeboek van die Afrikaanse Taal (WAT) it is a shorter Afrikaans explanatory dictionary in a single volume. The latest edition of the HAT, the sixth, was published in 2015, 50 years after the first edition of 1965. HAT6 comprises 1,636 pages.

== History ==
Understanding the history of the HAT requires an understanding of the relationship between the HAT and the Woordeboek van die Afrikaanse Taal (the WAT), initially known as Die Afrikaanse Woordeboek.

During the 1920s discussions were devoted to the compilation of an Afrikaans dictionary and in March 1926 the Nasionale Boekhandel and the government of the day agreed to the publication of a monolingual explanatory dictionary with an extent similar to that of the Dutch Van Dale (a single-volume work) at the time. J.J. Smith, professor of Afrikaans at the University of Stellenbosch, would be the editor, and the aim was to complete the work within three years.

When the dictionary was not completed in the proposed time, the University of Stellenbosch took over Nasionale Boekhandel's part of the contract, setting a new target of publishing the dictionary within five years.

After about 20 years Prof. Smith's health failed him. He took leave but did not resume his work on the dictionary. He was succeeded in 1947 as chief editor by Dr. P.C. Schoonees, a school principal from Vryheid.

In the meantime the goal of the WAT had shifted. A commission of inquiry recommended that a board of control be established. The secretary of education would serve as chairperson and the rector of the University of Stellenbosch as administrator. Hereafter the goal was no longer to compile a desk dictionary, but a comprehensive work that would record and explain the “complete” Afrikaans vocabulary, such as the Oxford English Dictionary (OED) for English and the Woordenboek der Nederlandsche Taal (WNT) for Dutch.

Under Schoonees's guidance the first part of the dictionary (A—C) was published in 1951, the second part (D—F) in 1955 and the third part (G) in 1957.

== First edition (1965) ==
Consequently, towards the end of the 1950s and beginning of the 1960s, the board of control decided that compilation of a “standard” or “desk” dictionary should commence alongside the work on the comprehensive dictionary. Adverts were placed for the post of editor, but although many applications were received, the board made no appointment.

Subsequently, Schoonees accepted the challenge to compile an Afrikaans desk dictionary in his own time. The board of control approved his undertaking; moreover, it gave him permission to use the WAT’s material for his task.

With the help of C.J. Swanepoel, a co-editor of the WAT, the work accelerated somewhat, but according to Schoonees still not quickly enough. Dr. S.J. du Toit, another co-editor of the WAT, was seconded too, and later the Afrikaans teacher, C. Murray Booysen, joined the team as well. The first edition of the Verklarende Handwoordeboek van die Afrikaanse Taal was published in 1965 under all four names, though by then Booysen had retired for health reasons. Although Schoonees was the de facto chief editor, he was not named as such.

HAT1 was published by Voortrekkerpers, which would some years later merge with the Afrikaanse Pers Boekhandel to form Perskor. HAT2 and HAT3 were published by Perskor. HAT4 (still with the Perskor imprint) and HAT5 were published by Pearson Education South Africa, a division of Maskew Miller Longman, into which Perskor was incorporated in the late 1990s.

== Second edition (1979) ==
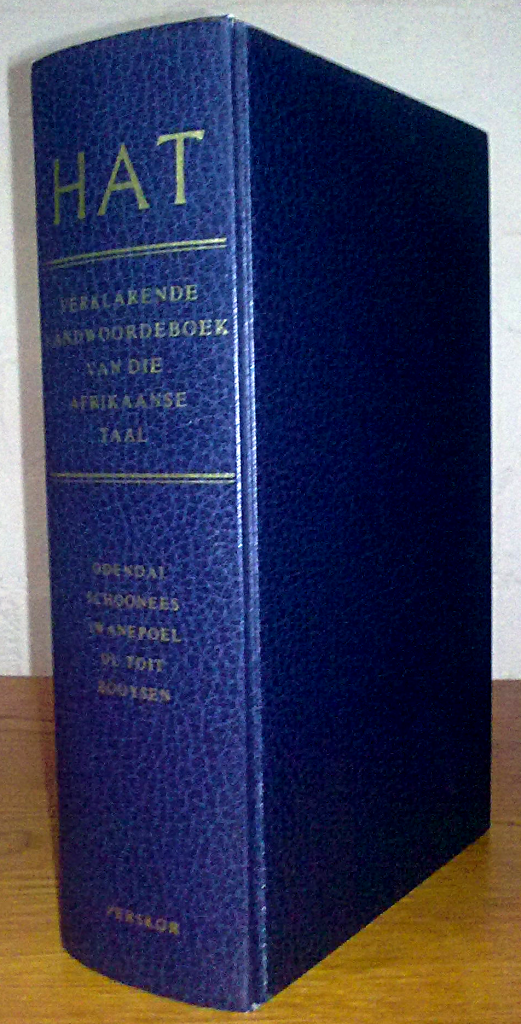
HAT 2nd edition, 4th impression from 1984

In 1971 Perskor offered Francois F. Odendal, professor in Afrikaans and Dutch linguistics at the then Rand Afrikaans University and chairperson of the language commission of the South African Academy for Science and Arts, the editorship of the HAT. At this point Odendal had published several papers on the lexicography. He had worked at the state terminology bureau for three years and had served as co-editor and assistant chief editor of the WAT for ten years.

In 1972 Odendal assumed full responsibility for HAT2. Thus a new chapter in the history of the HAT began, with Odendal as the sole editor for almost 25 years.

For the second edition he expanded the dictionary by about 50%. Besides additions, definitions were altered and archaic words and meanings deleted, especially words and meanings that were more Dutch than Afrikaans. (Here the contribution of Mrs Estelle Odendal should be mentioned, who recorded new and missing words from newspapers, magazines and books the whole time her husband was working on the HAT.)

HAT2 was published in 1979 by Perskor under Odendal's name, with the names of the original four editors (even though their contribution had ceased). The dictionary had a favourable reception, prompting Odendal to continue with the work with a third edition in mind.

== Third edition (1993) ==
When Perskor began talking about a third edition, Odendal started to work on the dictionary full-time. He left the service of RAU in 1989, two years before his compulsory retirement date, to complete the revision.

HAT3 was published in 1993. In the late 1990s HAT3 was also released in an electronic format – the first Afrikaans dictionary on CD-ROM, called el-HAT.

In preparing HAT3, the extent of the dictionary was increased by 30% (made possible by setting the text in three columns instead of two). More archaic words were removed and labels were systematically revised (which meant that a word without a label could be assumed to be standard Afrikaans).

== Fourth edition (2000) ==
Odendal proposed to Perskor in the 1990s that it was time to appoint a second, younger editor. Rufus H. Gouws, professor in Afrikaans linguistics at the University of Stellenbosch, was selected.

In the planning of HAT4 Gouws and Odendal decided that the allocated time precluded an incisive revision of HAT3. For a general revision the dictionary was divided between the editors into two equal parts. Odendal would take the first half, Gouws the second. However, one editor would be responsible for a particular aspect from A to Z, such as adding citations, refining the labels, and supplementing and checking computer terms. In spite of the limited time archaisms were deleted and many new words added. An innovation was the inclusion of a number of English words. A diagram illustrating the various components of a lemma was included in the front matter of the book.

HAT4 was published in 2000 by Pearson Education South Africa, a division of Maskew Miller Longman, into which Perskor was incorporated. (The name Perskor was retained as imprint for the fourth edition.)

== Fifth edition (2005) ==
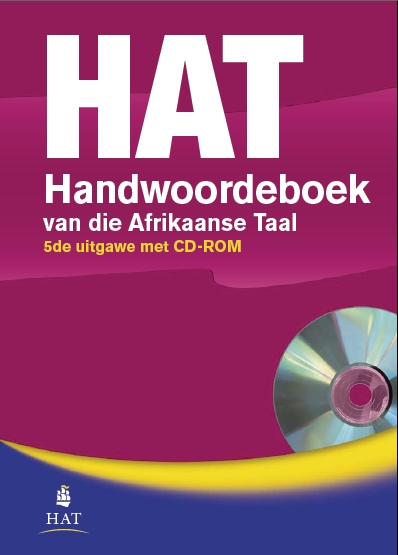
HAT 5th edition with CD-ROM

In 2003 Pearson asked the compilers to deliver a fifth edition in 2004. Both editors reacted negatively: there was too little time. As a more realistic target Gouws suggested 2005, which would also allow its publication to coincide with the fortieth anniversary of the first publication of the HAT in 1965.

For HAT5 the two editors again took responsibility for one half of the dictionary, Gouws the first half, Odendal the second (the reverse of HAT4). As with HAT4 each editor assumed special responsibility for particular aspects of the dictionary as a whole: expanding the etymologies, improving the lemma layout, expanding the abbreviations and moving them to a special section at the back of the book, adding a section of geographical names with their derivatives, refining the labels further, sourcing additional suitable citations, and compiling a complete usage guide for the front matter. In addition more “foreign” yet common words were included as well as words from varieties other than standard Afrikaans.

== e-HAT 2009 ==
In October 2007 Pearson Education appointed Jana Luther, inter alia former senior editor of the Pharos Afrikaans-English-English-Afrikaans Dictionary (2005) and co-editor of the Pharos Afrikaans-English-English-Afrikaans Concise Dictionary (2007), as dictionary compiler and publisher. In 2008 she joined Gouws as editor for the preparation of HAT6.

A CD-ROM – e-HAT 2009 – was launched with the third impression of HAT5 in March 2009. This electronic dictionary contains the complete alphabetical list, list of abbreviations and list of geographical names and their derivatives of the fifth edition of the Verklarende Handwoordeboek van die Afrikaanse Taal. The third edition received a new cover and the title was truncated to Handwoordeboek van die Afrikaanse Taal). Typographical and spelling errors that were brought to the editors’ attention since the publication of the fifth edition in 2005 were corrected in the electronic dictionary and, in accordance with the Afrikaanse woordelys en spelreëls of the Afrikaans language commission of the SA Academy, certain improvements were applied.

e-HAT 2009 is the first step on the road to a new, improved and comprehensively revised sixth edition of the HAT that is intended to mirror contemporary Afrikaans. The work on this new edition has been ongoing at Pearson South Africa since 2008 and was nearing completion at the beginning of 2015. To assist in the preparation of HAT6, Pearson in 2012 appointed Fred Pheiffer, a former colleague of Luther and co-editor of the abovementioned two Pharos dictionaries. In addition he worked as compiler, co-editor and project manager on the Oxford Bilingual School Dictionary: isiZulu and English (2010), the Oxford South African School Dictionary (2010), the Oxford Afrikaanse Skoolwoordeboek (2012) and the Oxford Bilingual School Dictionary: isiXhosa and English (2014).
