= Hoërskool Fichardtpark =

School in Free State, South Africa

Location
- 24 Hudson Drive, Fichardt Park; Bloemfontein, Free State, 9301; South Africa

Information
- School type: Public
- Motto: Glo, Werk & Dien (Believe, Work & Serve)
- Religious affiliation: Christianity
- Established: 1984; 42 years ago
- School district: District 9
- School number: 051 522 6927
- Principal: Herman van der Merwe
- Grades: 8–12
- Gender: Boys & Girls
- Age: 14 to 18
- Language: Afrikaans
- Schedule: 07:30 - 14:00
- Hours in school day: 6 hours, 30 minutes
- Colours: Blue; White; Yellow
- Nickname: Fichies
- Rivals: Hoërskool Jim Fouché; Hoërskool Sentraal
- Website: www.fpark.co.za

Hoërskool Fichardtpark is a public Afrikaans medium co-educational high school situated in the suburb of Fichardtpark in Bloemfontein in the Free State province of South Africa, It is one of the top and most academic schools in the Free State. It was founded in 1984.

The school is named after Fichardt Park, the suburb in which it is located.

== Sports ==
- Athletics
- Chess
- Cricket
- Cycling
- Cheerleading
- Golf
- Gym
- Hockey
- Netball
- Shooting
- Rugby
- Tennis

== Subjects ==
Sources:

- History
- Drama
- Afrikaans
- Business Studies
- Computer Application Technology
- Engineering Graphics and Design
- English
- Life Orientation
- Life Science
- Mathematics
- Mathematical Literacy
- Music
- Information Technology (Delphi Programming)
- Physical Science
- Technology
