= Afrikaanse Woordelys en Spelreëls =

Orthographic guide to Afrikaans spelling

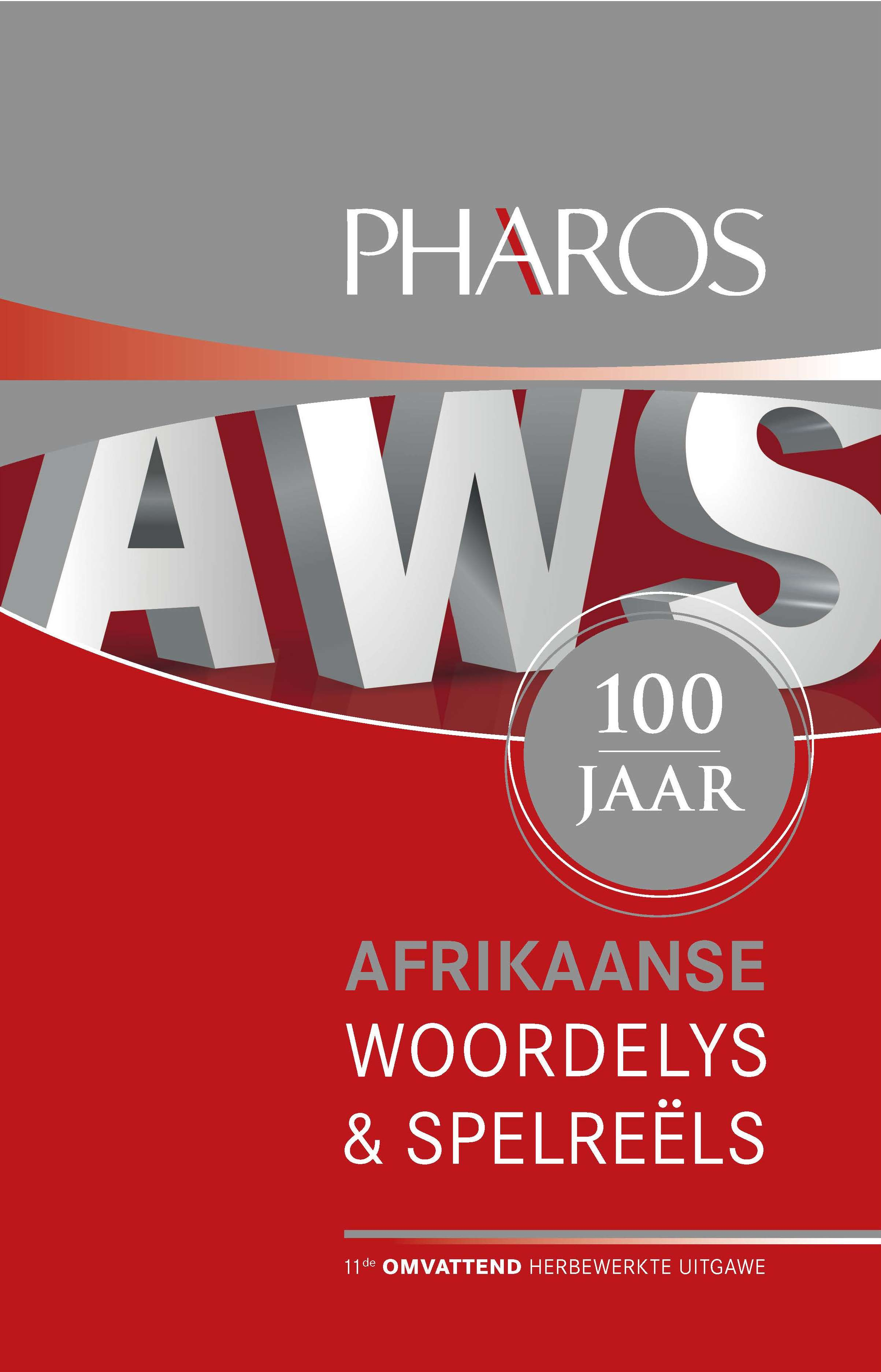
The centenary edition of the Afrikaanse Woordelys en Spelreëls, published in 2017. It is sometimes referred to as the "Red Book" to distinguish it from previous editions.

The Afrikaanse Woordelys en Spelreëls (AWS) an orthographic guide to provide a framework with respect to Afrikaans spelling. It is a publication of the Suid-Afrikaanse Akademie vir Wetenskap en Kuns and comprises three main sections: spelling rules, a list of words, and a list of abbreviations for Afrikaans. The first full edition appeared in 1917, and regular revisions have been undertaken since then to keep track with the evolution of the language.

It is by no means a complete list of Afrikaans words, rather, it aims to highlight problematic cases or indicate less common words as acceptable. The word list contains a selection of Afrikaans words to indicate the correct spelling, variant forms, use of hyphens, capital letters, and diacritics. Specific spelling rules are given, explaining the conventions of Standard Afrikaans. Topics include: Principles of Afrikaans spelling, variant forms, sounds (vowels, diphthongs, and consonants), plural forms, orthographic signs (apostrophe, acute accent, circumflex, diaeresis, hyphen), capital letters, diminutives, degrees of comparison, punctuation marks, and the rules for writing words separately or as compounds.

== History ==
The South African Academy of Science and Arts was founded on 2 July 1909 in Bloemfontein to promote Afrikaans and Dutch language and literature, South African history, antiquities, and the arts. The Academy began compiling spelling rules for Afrikaans in 1914, and the first word list (then called "Woordelijs") was included in Yearbook V of the Academy in 1914. The first spelling rules (then called "Spelregels") were approved by the Academy on 8 September 1915 (Yearbook VI of 1915), after which they were published together with the word list in pamphlet form in 1916. The first Afrikaanse Woordelijs en Spelreëls was published in book form in 1917, with a second, revised printing appearing in 1918.

== Editions ==
By 2017 eleven editions of the AWS have appeared, of which the second edition was merely a reprint of the first – therefore essentially ten editions.

1917 edition

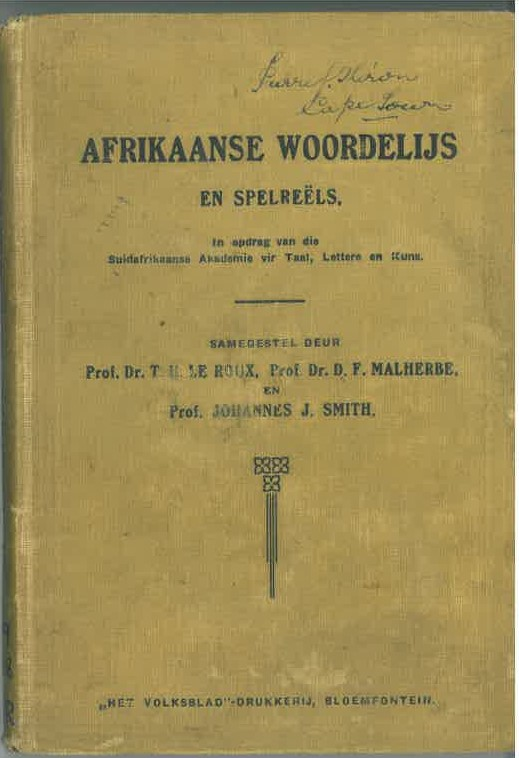
The front cover of the 1917 edition of the Afrikaanse Woordelys en Spelreëls

The first Afrikaanse Woordelys en Spelreëls (AWS) was published in 1917. The compilers were T.H. le Roux, D.F. Malherbe, and Johannes J. Smith, working on instruction from the Suid‑Afrikaanse Akademie vir Taal, Wetenskap en Kuns. Other members of the spelling commission included Jan F.E. Cilliers, J.D. du Toit, C.J. Langenhoven, and Gustav Preller. The preface to the 1917 edition presented the work as the culmination of linguistic developments since the founding of the Genootskap van Regte Afrikaners in 1875. Despite this claim of continuity, the 1917 spelling system differed markedly from the GRA’s earlier “Patriot” orthography.

The term “beskaafde Afrikaans” (cultivated Afrikaans) is explained as “what is customary is cultivated; what is not customary is uncultivated.”

The 1917 AWS formulated five fundamental principles (“grondbeginsels”) of Afrikaans spelling:

1. Each sound is represented by a separate letter, and no unnecessary letters are used.
2. Words, prefixes and suffixes are spelled consistently wherever possible.
3. Historical forms are respected only where practical.
4. Afrikaans should deviate as little as possible from the Simplified Dutch Spelling.
5. The most common pronunciation is normative.

These principles placed Afrikaans orthography somewhere between Dutch tradition and emerging Afrikaans phonology. A major departure from GRA spelling was the explicit requirement to avoid unnecessary divergence from Dutch. The accompanying wordlist from 1917 contained 15,680 entries and 48 rules, illustrating the transitional state of Afrikaans spelling in the early twentieth century.

1921 edition (third edition)

The main contributors were T.H. le Roux, D.F. Malherbe, Johannes J. Smith, D.B. Bosman. This edition made limited changes but addressed two major criticisms of the 1917 AWS: the large number of variant forms and the perceived leniency toward foreign spellings. Major adjustments included dropping the silent w (e.g., opbouw → opbou), replacing ij with y, and simplifying diacritic rules.

1931 edition (fourth edition)

The main contributors were S.P.E. Boshoff, D.B. Bosman, T.H. le Roux, D.F. Malherbe. Prepared after the Taalkommissie received a mandate in 1926 to revise the AWS comprehensively, this edition aimed to remove inconsistencies, incorporate more technical terms, and provide clarity where no consensus existed. It introduced revised spelling principles aligned with the Simplified Dutch Spelling (Vereenvoudigde Nederlandse Spelling).

1937 edition (fifth edition)

The main contributors were S.P.E. Boshoff, D.B. Bosman, L.W. Hiemstra, T.H. le Roux, D.F. Malherbe. This edition represented continuity with the 1931 revision, consolidated the evolving standard and formed a transitional stage toward the more substantial reforms of the following postwar editions.

1953 edition (sixth edition)

The main contributors were S.P.E. Boshoff, S.J. du Toit, L.W. Hiemstra, Willem Kempen, T.H. le Roux, D.F. Malherbe, and Johannes du Plessis Scholtz. This edition differed substantially from its predecessors and removed many words considered unproblematic for spelling purposes. It expanded the technical and scientific vocabulary, introduced an updated list of abbreviations, and reduced the number of variant forms.

1964 edition (seventh edition)

The Taalkommissie as a whole was cited as the compiler and major figures included Willem Kempen, H.J. Terblanche, and H.J.J.M. van der Merwe. Often referred to as the “Brown Book” due to the colour of the cover, this edition made extensive revisions reflecting significant growth in the language. It expanded technical terminology. The foreign words were systematically Afrikaansised (e.g., cheque → tjek).

1991 edition (eighth edition)

The main contributors were Francois Odendal, Johan Combrink, Louis Eksteen, Jarries van Jaarsveld and other newly appointed members of the Taalkommissie. Published nearly three decades after the previous edition, this “Blue Book” (called so due to the blue cover) reformulated all spelling rules for clarity, while maintaining earlier principles, introduced phonetic guidance, and recognised a broader range of Afrikaans words of African language origin.

2002 edition (ninth edition)

The main contributors were Anton Prinsloo (chair), Ernst Kotzé, Frikkie Lombard, Mariëtta Alberts, Johan Anker, Wannie Carstens, Anna Coetzee and Tom McLachlan. Referred to as the “Rainbow Book” due to the colour of the cover, it reverted several rules to their 1964 formulations and refined and simplified spelling principles. The rules were reorganised alphabetically by topic and numbered for ease of reference. An additional list of colloquial Afrikaans words was included for the first time.

2009 edition (tenth edition)

The main contributors were Mariëtta Alberts, Johan Anker, Madaleine du Plessis, Ernst Kotzé, Frikkie Lombard, Tom McLachlan, Annél Otto and Gerhard van Huyssteen. Known as the “Green Book,” this edition made greater use of corpus‑based evidence, simplified the rules for capitalisation, and removed the colloquial wordlist introduced in 2002.

2017 edition (eleventh edition)

The main contributors were Herman Beyer, Frank Hendricks, Sophia Kapp, Frikkie Lombard, Phillip Louw, Jana Luther, Marné Pienaar, Suléne Pilon and Gerhard van Huyssteen. Issued as the centenary “Red Book,” this edition provided a comprehensive user guide, a concise history of the AWS, a fully rewritten chapter on punctuation, and—for the first time—systematic rules for degrees of comparison. New appendices covered country names and currencies, geographical names in the East, the periodic table, and SI‑unit guidelines. The wordlist increased to more than 34,000 entries and a total of 457 spelling rules.

Over its first hundred years, the Afrikaanse Woordelys en Spelreëls developed into a comprehensive and authoritative standard for written Afrikaans. The successive revisions illustrate the maturation of Afrikaans as a modern language with a stable and widely accepted orthography.

== See also ==
- Handwoordeboek van die Afrikaanse Taal (HAT) (Concise Afrikaans Dictionary)
- Woordeboek van die Afrikaanse Taal (WAT) (Comprehensive Afrikaans Dictionary)
- Differences between Afrikaans and Dutch
- IPA/Afrikaans
