= Hoërskool Jim Fouché =

Public school in Free State, South Africa

- Hoërskool Jim Fouché school crest

Location
- Lilac Street, Gardeniapark; Bloemfontein, Free State; South Africa
- Coordinates: 29.1282°S 26.1758°E

Information
- Type: Public & Boarding
- Motto: Saai Om te oes! (Sowing to harvest!)
- School district: District 4
- Principal: Henri Wilken
- Teaching staff: 67
- Grades: 8–12
- Gender: Boys & Girls
- Age: 14 to 18
- Enrollment: 1,064 (2011); 950 (2013); 1068 (2024)
- Language: Afrikaans
- Schedule: 07:20 - 13:40
- Hours in school day: 6 hours, 20 minutes
- Campus: Urban Campus
- Colours: Black; Green; Orange; White
- Mascot: Jimmy; Jenny
- Rival: Hoërskool Sentraal; Hoërskool Fichardtpark
- Accreditation: Free State Department of Education
- Newspaper: JF Oester

Hoërskool Jim Fouché is a public Afrikaans medium co-educational high school situated in the suburb of Gardeniapark in Bloemfontein in the Free State province of South Africa. It is one of the top academic schools in the Free State. It was founded in 1959.

The school is a successor to Wilgehof Hoërskool, and was named after Jacobus "Jim" Fouché, who became President of South Africa in 1968.

== Notable alumni ==
- Leon Schuster (1968, teacher 1973–75)
- Brendan Peyper (2014), singer
- Jamba Ulengo (born 1990), rugby union player for the Tel Aviv Heat
