= University of the Free State =

Multi-campus public university in South Africa

Coordinates: 29°06′16″S 26°10′31″E

- Universiteit van die Vrystaat; Yunivesithi ya Freistata
- Former names: Grey University College (1904–1935) University College of the Orange Free State (1935–1950) University of the Orange Free State (Universiteit van die Oranje Vrystaat) (1950–2001)
- Motto: In Veritate Sapientiae Lux (In Truth is the Light of Wisdom)
- Type: Public university
- Established: 1904; 122 years ago
- Chancellor: Prof Bonang Francis Mohale
- Vice-Chancellor: Prof Hester C. Klopper
- Students: 41,169 (2023)
- Undergraduates: 34,446 (2023)
- Postgraduates: 6,396 (2023)
- Location: Bloemfontein, Free State, South Africa
- Campus: Bloemfontein Campus South Campus (Bloemfontein) Qwaqwa Campus (Phuthaditjhaba, Free State)
- Website: www.ufs.ac.za

The University of the Free State (Afrikaans: Universiteit van die Vrystaat; Sesotho: Yunivesithi ya Freistata) is a multi-campus public university in Bloemfontein, the capital of the Free State and the judicial capital of South Africa. It was first established as an institution of higher learning in 1904 as a tertiary section of Grey College. It was declared an independent Afrikaans-language university in 1950 and the name was changed to the University of the Orange Free State. The university has two satellite campuses. Initially a whites-only precinct, the university was fully de-segregated in 1996. The first black university vice-chancellor was appointed in 2010.

== History ==
The long-held dream of an institution of higher education in the Free State became a reality in 1904 when the Grey College first accepted matriculants for a full B.A. course. In 1906 the tertiary part of Grey College became known as the Grey University College (GUC), but shortly thereafter the school and college parted ways. In 1910, the Parliament of the Orange River Colony passed legislation declaring the GUC an official educational institution in the fields of the Arts and Sciences. In terms of the modern South African university system, the University of the Free State owes its formal emergence to the University of South Africa (UNISA), itself established as an autonomous university by legislation in 1916. UNISA, at the time, was an "umbrella" or federal institution with its seat in Pretoria, playing an academic trusteeship role for several colleges that eventually became autonomous universities. One of the colleges that were under UNISA's trusteeship was Grey University College, Bloemfontein. UNISA's trusteeship ended in 1949 when the Orange Free State University received a charter as a university.

Initially, the medium of instruction was English, but later this changed to be bilingual and included Afrikaans. The name was changed to the University College of the Orange Free State—the Afrikaans version of this name change is the source of the word used to this day to refer to students of the university ("Kovsies"). In the late 1940s, the medium of instruction was changed to Afrikaans. The university was declared a full-fledged, independent university in 1950, and the name was again changed to the University of the Orange Free State.

In 1993, it adopted a system of parallel-medium tuition. However, the university decided to make English the primary medium of instruction in 2016. Subsequent to the adoption in 1999 of a new university statute, the UFS entered a significant growth period. Today, the University of the Free State counts more students than ever in its history.

In February 2001, the university's name changed to the University of the Free State, which was adopted to reflect the real character of the institution and its environment. In 2004, the university celebrated its centenary.

== Language policy ==
After the defeat of the Boers by the British in 1902 the Orange Free State became known as the Orange River Colony during which time the official language was changed from Dutch to English. Therefore, when the Grey University College was founded in 1904, the language medium was English. However, Dutch was one of the subjects taught at the college from the very beginning. Language activists in favor of Afrikaans made it possible for the language to be accepted as one of the subjects at the college as a "supplementary subject to Dutch" in 1919 when Afrikaans became a popular subject. In 1950 the University of the Orange Free State (UOFS) was established and the official medium language was Afrikaans. The name of the university again changed in 2001 to the University of the Free State as it is known today. Although a bilingual language policy (Afrikaans & English) were introduced since 1993 it was formalized in 2003. However, the university decided to make English the primary medium of instruction in 2016. This decision was jointly challenged by civil rights group AfriForum and Solidarity (South African trade union) but the decision to remove Afrikaans was upheld by the Constitutional Court of South Africa in 2017; when the judgment favored the university's new language policy which has been implemented since then.

== Campuses ==
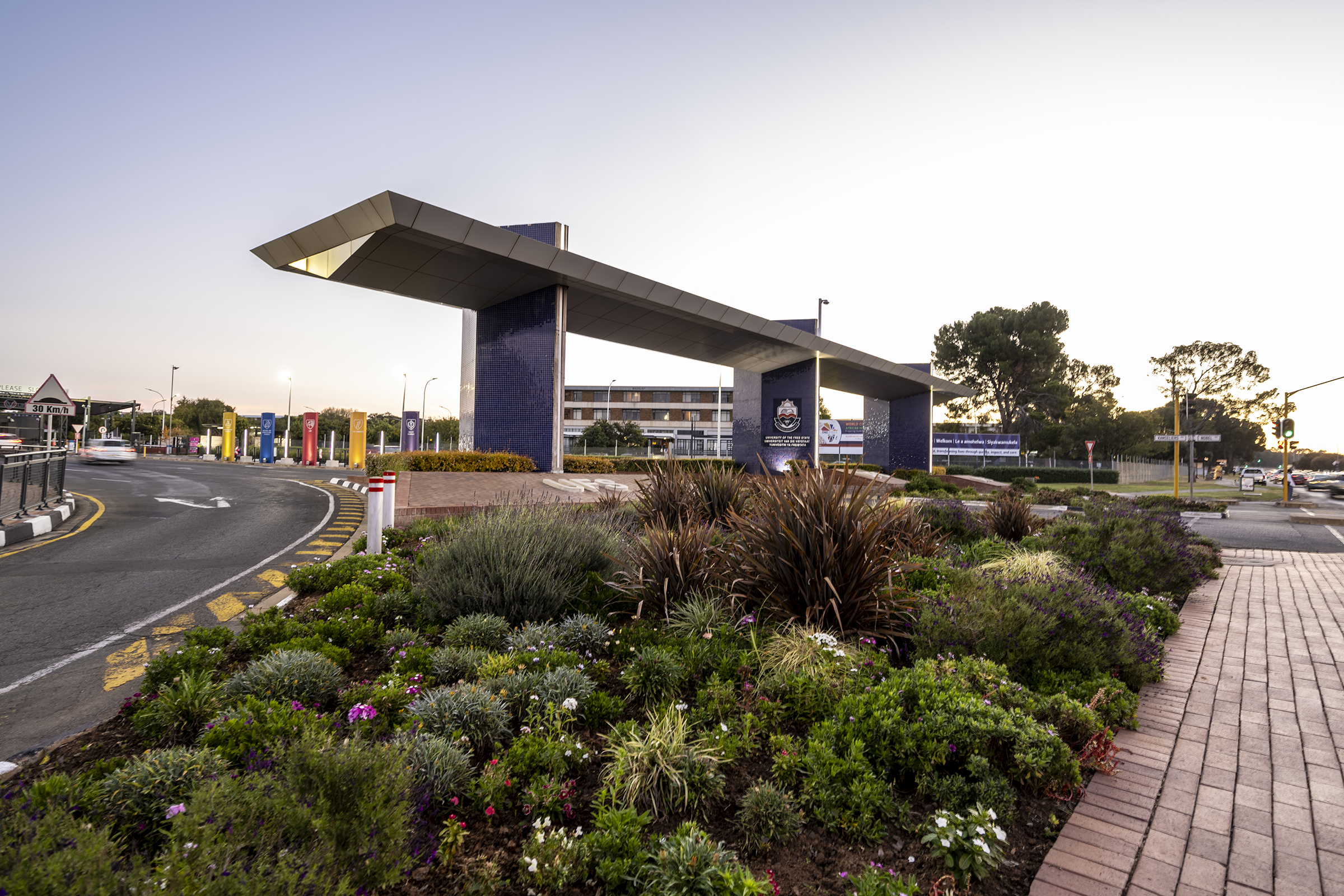
The main entrance to the University of the Free State.

The university's Bloemfontein Campus is near the city centre. The university also has three campuses. Two are situated in Bloemfontein, referred to as the Bloemfontein Campus and the South Campus, and the other in the former homeland QwaQwa that was, until 2003, part of the University of the North.

The university sports facilities cater for more than 20 sports, medical facilities and cultural activities, ranging from the political arena to outdoor life and the creative arts. It has a student centre, a student newspaper, the IRAWA and a campus radio station KovsieFm. In addition, students have access to a library, The Sasol Library, as well as the Frik Scott medical library, a career and guidance centre, a student theatre and a computer centre.

== Academic divisions ==
- Economic and Management Sciences
- Education
- Health Sciences
- Law
- Natural and Agricultural Sciences
- The Humanities
- Theology and Religion
- Business School
- Open distance learning

== Notable alumni ==
Main List: Notable Alumni of the University of the Free State

- Oprah Winfrey,(1954-): American TV show host and philanthropist received honorary doctorate in education
- P. W. Botha (1916–2006): Prime Minister of South Africa from 1978 to 1984 and the first executive state president from 1984 to 1989
- S.P.E. Boshoff (1891–1973): South African linguist and writer
- Heinrich Brüssow (1986–): Springbok rugby player
- Hansie Cronje (1969–2002): cricketer and captain of the South African national cricket team in the 1990s
- Winkie Direko (1929–2012): Premier of the Free State 1999–2004
- Bram Fischer (1908–1975): Grandson of Abraham Fischer, lawyer, and notable anti-apartheid activist, including legal defence of anti-apartheid figures, such as Nelson Mandela
- Maye Musk (1948–): Model and dietitian
- Rassie Erasmus (1972–): International rugby player, Springbok coach
- Neil Powell (1978–): Coach of South Africa national rugby sevens team, 2016 Olympic Bronze medalist team coach
- Colin Ingram (1985–): Cricketer and member of the South African national cricket team
- Wayde van Niekerk (1992–): 400m world and Olympic record holder
- Antjie Krog (1952–): poet
- Deon Meyer (1958–): novelist
- Elzabe Rockman (1967–): Member of the Executive Council for Finance 2013–2019
- Karel Schoeman (1939–2017): Historian, translator, and author
- Leon Schuster (1951–): filmmaker, comedian, actor, presenter, and singer
- Rolene Strauss (1992–): Miss World 2014
- C. R. Swart (1894–1982): First State President of the Republic of South Africa 1961–1967
- Jamba Ulengo (born 1990): rugby union player for the Tel Aviv Heat
- Rolene Streutker (born 2000): Member of the South Africa national netball team
- Thato Mosehle (born 1995) South African doctor and Miss Supranational South Africa 2021

== Notable staff ==
- Category:Academic staff of the University of the Free State

== Ranking ==
In 2010 Webometrics ranked the university the ninth best in South Africa and 2095th in the world.

UWC Times Higher Education Ranking 2023 to 2024
| Year | World Rank |
|---|---|
| 2024 | 801–1000 |
| 2023 | 801–1000 |

== Partnerships ==
The University of the Free State maintains student exchange and academic partnerships with several other universities including Schmalkalden University and the University of Haifa.

== Controversies ==
After having previously been open only to whites, UFS admitted its first black students in the early 1990s, as apartheid in South Africa began to end. Large majorities of students of all races supported racial integration of the housing facilities, and for several years UFS was seen as a model integration project. However, in the mid- to late-1990s, blacks began to form a larger percentage of the student body (they are 85% of the population of the Free State province) and began to be less enthusiastic about continuing traditions from the history of UFS. After a 1996 riot, the UFS student residences became de facto re-segregated. Furthermore, as classes became offered in English as well as Afrikaans, classes also became segregated as whites favoured Afrikaans-language classes and blacks favoured English-language classes.

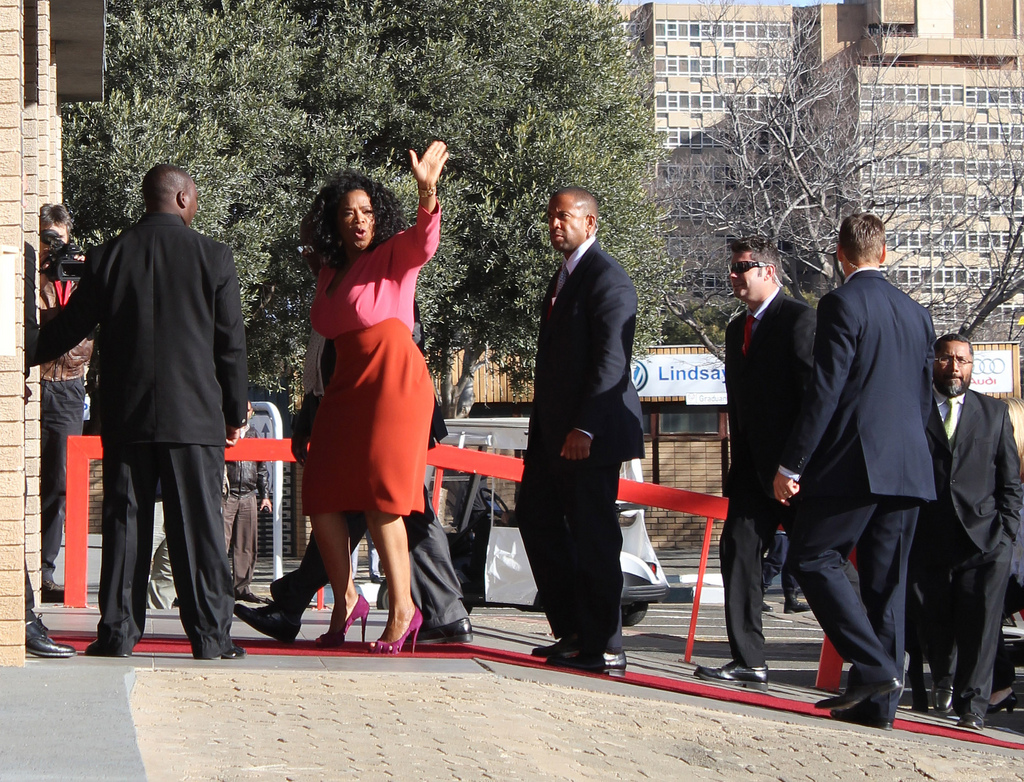
Oprah Winfrey received an honorary doctorate in education from the university on 24 June 2011.

The university faced controversy in late February 2008 following a video made by four white students of the Reitz residence which was referred to as being a protest against racial integration on the campus. The video depicted five black workers being subjected to various mock activities, including being forced to consume food which appeared to have been urinated on. The video received coverage from both South African and international media and condemnation from most major political parties in South Africa, and led to riots and racial strife among students at the university. In riots that followed the video, threats were made against white students by protesting black students.

The council of the university closed the Reitz hostel over the incident and the incident triggered a broader investigation into racism in education by the Department of Education of South Africa.

The then-new Vice-Chancellor, Jonathan Jansen – a strong proponent of intellectual freedom and the first black president of UFS – was appointed and he has subsequently initiated a process for campus-wide racial integration among students which included inviting the four students to continue with their studies at the university. Jansen was widely criticised for pardoning the students and failing to consult the workers subjected to racist humiliation before doing so. In 2010, the university was awarded the World Universities Forum Award for Best Practice in Higher Education which praised amongst other the racial integration and harmonisation of the student community. On receiving her honorary doctorate from the university, Oprah Winfrey called the transformation of the university as "nothing short of a miracle" when referring to the incident and subsequent racial integration. However, later assessments have argued that "neither the institutional problems nor the individual bad apples were dealt with" and that Jansen's approach reflected a tendency to diminish the harms of apartheid.

In April 2015, the University of the Free State, under leadership of UFS Rector and Vice-Chancellor, Prof. Jonathan Jansen, led a three-day discussion session about the role and place of statues, symbols, and signs at the university which initiated the process to remove the statues of C. R. Swart and Martinus Theunis Steyn. In 2016, following protests during the FeesMustFall movement; the statue of C. R. Swart was vandalized by Economic Freedom Fighters protesters. C. R. Swart served as the Governor General of South Africa from 1960 to 1961 where after he became the president of the Republic of South Africa from 1961 until 1967. Being a symbol of importance to the Afrikaners, the statue was removed from campus by the Voortrekkers movement on 19 December 2016 where after it was restored and relocated to the Sarel Cilliers heritage site.

In 2018, the university targeted the statue of President MT Steyn, the last Boer president of the Orange Free State, as a priority to be dealt with according to its Integrated Transformation Plan (ITP). In November, the Rector and Vice-Chancellor, Prof Francis Petersen, stated that a large portion of the student body felt unwelcome near the statue and that a “Special Task Team” found that there could be no historical reinterpretation of the statue and that it should therefore be relocated.

== See also ==
- Open access in South Africa and List of South African open access repositories
