= Brendan Peyper =

South African Afrikaans singer (born 1996)

- Born: Brendan Peyper; 7 August 1996 (age 30); Bloemfontein, South Africa
- Genres: Pop
- Occupations: Singer; songwriter
- Instruments: Vocals; guitar
- Years active: 2015–present
- Website: brendanpeyper.com

Brendan Peyper (born 7 August 1996) is a South African singer-songwriter. He released his debut album Stop, wag, bly nog 'n bietjie in 2015 and then a follow-up album Hy Loop Oop in 2017. His latest album is Omdat Jy Mag which was released in 2024. He was on his search for love on KyKNet's third season of Op My Eish where he chose Janae Stander as the winner of his heart, unfortunately he was not the winner of her heart.

== Career ==
Brendan Peyper was born in Bloemfontein in a farming family. He studied at Hoërskool Jim Fouché with plans to study sound engineering. He started playing guitar at the age of five and began his professional career in music at age 14. He attracted audiences early on with sincere, infectious lyrics.

His first single, Stop, wag, bly nog 'n bietjie, was a success with Channel 24 dubbing it the hottest music video. He followed it up with Tafelberg vir Twee light accompanied by a new music video with good following.

== Filmography ==
| Year | Title | Role |
|---|---|---|
| 2024 | Op My Eish | Himself |

== Discography ==
=== Album ===
| Title | Album details | Notes |
|---|---|---|
| Stop, wag, bly nog 'n bietjie | Release date: 25 September 2015; Label: SME Africa; Formats: CD, LP, digital download | Tracklist: 1. "Die Perfekte Een Vir My" (3:12); 2. "Stop, wag, bly nog 'n bietjie" (3:39); 3. "Jong Liefde Sal Ons Jonk Hou" (3:26); 4. "Tafelberg vir Twee" (3:42); 5. "Nothin' Like You" (3:05); 6. "Gebreektehartsvallei" (3:26); 7. "'n Boeredrukkie vir My Boeremeisie" (4:01); 8. "Ek Sal By Jou Staan" (3:15) |
| Hy Loop Oop | Release date: 14 April 2017; Label: SME Africa; Formats: CD, LP, digital download | Tracklist: 1. "Twee Is Beter As Een" (4:04); 2. "Vanaand Sê Ek Net Ja" (3:35); 3. "Hy Loop Oop" (3:32); 4. "Jou Mond is In Die Pad" (3:52); 5. "Ek Gee Jou My Woord" (3:10); 6. "Net 'n Bietjie" (2:47); 7. "Niemand Soos Jy Nie" (4:08); 8. "In Silhouette Saam Met My (feat. Franja Du Plessis)" (4:20); 9. "Dis So Lekker Om Kort Te Wees" (3:01); 10. "Ek Soek" (3:21); 11. "Sal Jy My Kan Vergewe?" (4:32); 12. "Koffie Pure Plaas" (4:00); 13. "Rollercoaster" (3:25); 14. "Stille Waters" (4:13); 15. "Province Medley" (3:32) |
| Dis Nie Sonde Nie | Release date: 26 October 2018; Label: SME Africa; Formats: CD, LP, digital download | Tracklist: 1. "Maak Die Perde Los" (3:23); 2. "Dis Nie Sonde Nie" (3:46); 3. "Jy Laat Dit Maklik Lyk" (3:43); 4. "Vir Nou" (3:19); 5. "Mooi" (3:40); 6. "Klim Jou Everest" (3:31); 7. "Af Die Plaas Af" (2:59); 8. "Vat Aan My" (3:37); 9. "St. Elmo's Fire (Man in Motion)" (4:03); 10. "Die Lewe's Te Kort" (3:46); 11. "Ek Mis Jou Vir Niks Weer Nie" (3:25); 12. "Reg Soos 'n Roer" (3:07); 13. "Buddy Holly Medley" (5:02) |
| Twintig20 | Release date: 3 April 2020; Label: SME Africa; Formats: CD, LP, digital download | Tracklist: 1. "Sterk Soos 'n Leeu" (4:15); 2. "Lekkerder op my Trekker" (3:43); 3. "Dryf my teen die mure uit (Dis wat jy doen aan my)" (2:55); 4. "Dis alles jy" (3:17); 5. "Ek het jou nodig" (3:16); 6. "Malligheid" (3:23); 7. "Vasdanslyf" (3:34); 8. "Trouvrou" (4:22); 9. "Ons Maak Saak (Remix)" (4:32); 10. "Trompie" (3:30); 11. "Lief vir jou soos jy is" (2:55) |
| Insomnia | Release date: 22 July 2022; Label: SME Africa; Formats: CD, LP, digital download | Tracklist: 1. "Insomnia" (3:58); 2. "Toer Om Die Vloer" (3:11); 3. "Meisies Soos Jy" (4:10); 4. "Alleen Braai" (4:06); 5. "Die Boer In My" (3:40); 6. "Botter" (3:11); 7. "Skeur My Klere" (3:59) |

=== Singles ===
- 2015: "Stop, wag, bly nog 'n bietjie"
- 2015: "Tafelberg vir twee"
- 2015: "Die perfekte een vir my"
- 2017: "Twee is beter as een"
- 2017: "Vanaand sê ek net ja"
- 2018: "We Got Forever"
- 2018: "Klim Jou Everest"
- 2018: "Jy Laat Dit Maklik Lyk"
- 2018: "Maak Die Perde Los"
- 2018: "Like a River Flows"
- 2020: "Sterk Soos 'n Leeu"
- 2020: "Lekkerder Op My Trekker"
- 2021: "Dik en dun"
- 2021: "Op jou spoor"
- 2021: "Warm nog op"
- 2021: "Die Wolf"
- 2021: "Nooit 'n Glas"
- 2022: "Stop die wêreld ek wil afklim"
- 2022: "Meisies Soos Jy"
- 2022: "Meisies & Ouens Soos Jy (feat. Minke Brits)"
- 2023: "Nee of Ja"
- 2023: "Moegdans"
- 2024: "Soen Soos Wat Jy Dans"
- 2024: "Madelein"
- 2024: "Plaaspop (Mullet Mix)"
- 2024: "Jou Tipe Boer"
- 2025: "Kyk"
- 2025: “Brand”

== Awards and nominations ==
| Year | Ceremony | Award | Nominated | Result |
|---|---|---|---|---|
| 2016 | South African Music Awards | Best Pop Album (Afrikaans) | Stop, wag, bly nog 'n bietjie | Nominated |
| 2016 | South African Music Awards | South African Music Award for Best Engineered Album of the Year | Stop, wag, bly nog 'n bietjie | Nominated |
| 2016 | Ghoema Awards | Male Singer of the Year | Stop, wag, bly nog 'n bietjie | Nominated |
| 2016 | Ghoema Awards | Newcomer of the Year | Stop, wag, bly nog 'n bietjie | Nominated |
| 2019 | South African Music Awards | Best Pop Album | Dis Nie Sonde Nie | Nominated |
