= List of countries and territories where Afrikaans or Dutch are official languages =

Legal statuses Afrikaans and Dutch: Countries where Dutch is the majority language Countries where Dutch is an official or recognized language Countries where Afrikaans is an official or recognized language Dutch is a former official or recognized language of these countries

Percentages of Afrikaans and Dutch speakers (assuming a rounded total of 46 million) worldwide.
1. Native Dutch (47.8%)
2. Native Afrikaans (15.5%)
3. Afrikaans as second language (22.4%)
4. Dutch as second language (14.3%)

The following is a list of the countries and territories where Afrikaans or Dutch are official languages. It includes countries, which have Afrikaans and/or Dutch as (one of) their nationwide official language(s), as well as dependent territories with Afrikaans and/or Dutch as a co-official language.

Worldwide, Afrikaans and Dutch as native or second language are spoken by approximately 46 million people. There is a high degree of mutual intelligibility between the two languages, particularly in written form. As an estimated 90 to 95% of Afrikaans vocabulary is ultimately of Dutch origin, there are few lexical differences between the two languages; however, Afrikaans has a considerably more regular morphology, grammar, and spelling.

== Afrikaans or Dutch as official languages ==
Afrikaans and/or Dutch are the official language of five sovereign countries, which lie in the Americas, Africa and Europe. These countries are referred to as the Nederlands taalgebied (Dutch language area). The Netherlands, Belgium and Suriname are member states of the Dutch Language Union; South Africa refuses to become a member state although Afrikaans is integrated in the task statement of the Dutch Language Union.

Country	Population 2011	Speakers		Notes
Country	Population 2011	L1	L2	Notes
Belgium Dutch	11,303,000	6,215,000 (55%)	1,469,000 (13%)	De jure nationwide co-official language (majority language in Flemish Region and minority in Brussels-Capital Region)
Namibia Afrikaans	2,113,000	220,000 (10.4%)	lingua franca	Recognized national language
Netherlands Dutch	17,116,000	16,431,360 (96%)	687,000 (4%)	De jure sole nationwide official language
South Africa Afrikaans	51,770,000	6,860,000 (14%)	10,300,000 (19%)	De jure nationwide co-official language
Suriname Dutch	540,000	325,000 (60%)	215,000 (40%)	De jure sole nationwide official language
Total	c. 82,834,000	c. 29,069,000	c. 12,671,000+	

=== Dependent entities ===
Afrikaans and/or Dutch are co-official languages in several dependent entities. At certain administrative levels in the Kingdoms of the Netherlands and Belgium the Dutch language is a co-official language. The same happens with Afrikaans in South Africa.

==== Kingdom of the Netherlands ====
In the Kingdom of the Netherlands Dutch is the only language that has an official status in all spheres of administration. At the federal level, in most provinces and municipalities Dutch is the sole administrative language. However, in some constituent countries, a province and some municipalities Dutch is a co-official language, together with West Frisian, Papiamento or English.

Region	Status of the region	Status of the language
Aruba	constituent country	Dutch is a co-official language, together with Papiamento
Curaçao	constituent country	Dutch is a co-official language, together with Papiamento and English
Netherlands	constituent country	Dutch is the official language. Only Friesland and the Caribbean Netherlands have co-official languages.
Friesland	province	Dutch is a co-official language, together with West Frisian
Bonaire	municipality	Dutch is a co-official language, together with Papiamento
Sint Eustatius	municipality	Dutch is a co-official language, together with English
Saba	municipality	Dutch is a co-official language, together with English
Sint Maarten	constituent country	Dutch is a co-official language, together with English

==== Belgium ====
At the federal level Dutch, French and German are co-official languages. In the Flanders Region Dutch is the sole official language. In Brussels-Capital Region Dutch and French are co-official languages. In the Wallonia Region French and German are co-official languages, but in four municipalities with language facilities limited government services are also available in Dutch.

Region	Status of the region	Status of the language
Flanders (Dutch: Vlaanderen)	Region	Dutch is the sole official language. In 12 municipalities limited government services are also available in French
Brussels-Capital Region (Dutch: Brussels Hoofdstedelijk Gewest)	Region	Dutch and French are co-official languages
Wallonia (Dutch: Wallonië)	Region	French and German are the sole official language in different areas. In 4 municipalities limited government services are also available in Dutch
Comines-Warneton (Dutch: Komen-Waasten)	municipality	French is the sole official language, but limited government services are also available in Dutch
Enghien (Dutch: Edingen)	municipality	French is the sole official language, but limited government services are also available in Dutch
Flobecq (Dutch: Vloesberg)	municipality	French is the sole official language, but limited government services are also available in Dutch
Mouscron (Dutch: Moeskroen)	municipality	French is the sole official language, but limited government services are also available in Dutch

==== South Africa ====
Between 1910 and 1961 Dutch was a co-official language of South Africa, together with English. In 1961 Dutch was replaced by Afrikaans as a co-official language. However, between 1925 and 1984 Dutch and Afrikaans were seen as two varieties of the same language by the Official Languages of the Union Act, 1925 and later article 119 of the South African Constitution of 1961. After a short period (1984–1994) where Afrikaans and English were the two co-official languages of South Africa, Afrikaans has been one of eleven official languages since 1994.

Since 2012 a new language policy has been implemented where working languages of all government institutions were established. Every government institution is required to establish three working languages out of the eleven official languages. Provinces and municipalities are obligated to take into account the local language demographics before establishing three working languages.

Region	Status of the region	Status of the language
Western Cape (Afrikaans: Wes-Kaap)	Province	Afrikaans is a co-official language, together with English and Xhosa
City of Cape Town (Afrikaans: Stad Kaapstad)	municipality	Afrikaans is a co-official language, together with English and Xhosa. Afrikaans is the mother tongue of half of the population
Northern Cape (Afrikaans: Noord-Kaap)	province	Afrikaans is a co-official language, together with Tswhana, Xhosa and English. Afrikaans is the mother tongue of the majority of the population

== Status in other regions ==
Dutch is not an official language in Indonesia, but the language is widely used in Indonesia as a source language after a 350-year colonial period. Certainly in law, Dutch has some official status as many colonial laws are available in Dutch only.

Although Dutch is historically the native language of people in French Flanders, Dutch is not an official language in France or French Flanders.

== International institutions ==
Afrikaans and/or Dutch are an official languages of the following international institutions:

- Benelux Union (nld)
- African Union (afr)
- Caribbean Community (nld)
- European Union (nld)
- Union of South American Nations (nld)
- Dutch Language Union (afr/nld)

== See also ==
- Afrikaans speaking population in South Africa
- Differences between Afrikaans and Dutch
- Dutch Language Union
- Dutch-based creole languages

By ISO 639-3 code
Enter an ISO code to find the corresponding language article.
