= Jamba Ulengo =

South Africa international rugby union player

- Full name: Jamba Isaac Ulengo
- Born: 7 January 1990 (age 36) Vryburg, South Africa
- Height: 1.85 m (6 ft 1 in)
- Weight: 100 kg (220 lb; 15 st 10 lb)
- School: Hoërskool Jim Fouché
- University: University of the Free State

Rugby union career
- Position: Winger
- Current team: Griffons
Youth career
- 2005–2011: Free State Cheetahs
Amateur team(s)
Years	Team	Apps	(Points)
2010–2012	UFS Shimlas	18	(55)
Senior career
Years	Team	Apps	(Points)
2012	Free State XV	1	(0)
2014–2018	Blue Bulls	39	(125)
2015–2018	Bulls	23	(45)
2018	Blue Bulls XV	5	(15)
2019	Free State XV	7	(50)
2019–2022	Golden Lions	5	(0)
2020–2022	Lions	7	(15)
2021–2023	Tel Aviv Heat	6	(5)
2023–	Griffons	6	(5)
- Correct as of 16 September 2023
International career
Years	Team	Apps	(Points)
2012–2014	South Africa Sevens		
2016	Springbok XV	1	(0)
2016	South Africa	1	(0)
- Correct as of 13 April 2018
Medal record
Men's rugby sevens
Representing South Africa
World Games
Gold medal – first place	2013 Cali	Team competition

Jamba Isaac Ulengo (born 7 January 1990) is a South African rugby union player for the Tel Aviv Heat, which competes annually in the Rugby Europe Super Cup. His regular position is wing.

== Career ==
=== Youth and Varsity Cup rugby ===
He was chosen to represent the Free State at various youth levels while he was a scholar at Hoërskool Jim Fouché in Bloemfontein; in 2005 and 2006, he played at the Under-16 Grant Khomo Week tournaments, in 2007 he played at the Under-18 Academy Week tournament and in 2008 he played at the Under-18 Craven Week tournament. He continued to play for the Bloemfontein-based side after school too, playing for the Free State U19 side in the 2009 Under-19 Provincial Championship and for the Free State U21 side in the 2010 and 2011 Under-21 Provincial Championships, scoring twelve tries during those two seasons, which included a hat-trick against the Falcons U21 in 2011.

He also played Varsity Cup rugby for the UFS Shimlas between 2010 and 2012, scoring eleven tries in eighteen appearances over the three seasons.

=== Free State Cheetahs ===
Despite his long-standing involvement with the Free State youth sides, he made just a single appearance for the senior side. This appearance – his first class debut – came during the 2012 Vodacom Cup competition when he started in the Free State XV's 36–22 defeat to the Eastern Province Kings in Port Elizabeth. He was included in the Free State Cheetahs squad for the 2012 Currie Cup Premier Division, but didn't make any appearances for them.

=== Sevens ===
Ulengo was a prominent member of the South Africa Sevens since making his debut for them in the Scotland leg of the 2011–12 IRB Sevens World Series. He played for them in the two final tournaments of that season and then signed a two-year contract with the South African Rugby Union to represent them in the 2012–13 and 2013–14 series. While he only competed at four events in his first full season, he was involved in seven of the tournaments in his second season. He also helped South Africa win the gold medal at the 2013 World Games.

=== Bulls ===
Ulengo made his return to the 15-man version of the sport, signing a contract to play Currie Cup rugby for Pretoria-based side the Blue Bulls in 2014 and for their Super Rugby franchise, the Bulls, from the 2015 Super Rugby season.
