= Taalkommissie =

Language regulator of Afrikaans

The Taalkommissie ("Language Commission") is a subsidiary of the Suid-Afrikaanse Akademie vir Wetenskap en Kuns ("South African Academy for Science and Arts") that serves as the technical committee of the Nasionale Taalliggaam vir Afrikaans ("National Language Body for Afrikaans"), which is the language regulator of the Afrikaans language. The Akademie was founded in Bloemfontein in 1909, and its branch, the Spellingskommissie ("Spelling Commission"), in 1914.

The commission focuses mainly on the revision and publication of the Afrikaanse Woordelys en Spelreëls (AWS; "Afrikaans Word List and Spelling Rules"), a standard guide to the spelling and related writing conventions of Afrikaans. It is held as an authoritative source for the spelling of Afrikaans words.

Furthermore it takes cognisance of Afrikaans grammar and the natural developments in the Afrikaans language community, such as new terminology which emerges in technology and other disciplines. Its coverage of varieties of Standard Afrikaans is being expanded, which includes the Nama, Griqua and Kaaps varieties. A large corpus of the words used in the Afrikaans Muslim community is also included in the AWS.

== See also ==
- Pan South African Language Board
