= Fichardt Park =

- Benade Drive

- Location within Free State (South African province) Location within South Africa
- Coordinates: 29.144°S 26.180°E
- Country: South Africa
- Province: Free State
- Municipality: Mangaung
- Main Place: Bloemfontein

Area
  - Total: 5.34 km^{2} (2.06 sq mi)

Population (2011)
  - Total: 8,783
  - Density: 1,640/km^{2} (4,260/sq mi)

Racial makeup (2011)
  - Black African: 15.1%
  - Coloured: 3.4%
  - Indian/Asian: 0.7%
  - White: 80.1%
  - Other: 0.7%

First languages (2011)
  - Afrikaans: 82.7%
  - English: 8.1%
  - Sotho: 5.0%
  - Other: 4.2%
- Time zone: UTC+2 (SAST)
- Postal code (street): 9301
- PO box: 9317

Fichardt Park is a suburb of the city of Bloemfontein in South Africa.
