= Suid-Afrikaanse Akademie vir Wetenskap en Kuns =

Promoter of science, technology and the arts in Afrikaans

- Predecessor: Zuid-Afrikaanse Akademie voor Taal, Letteren en Kunst
- Formation: 2 July 1909; 117 years ago
- Founded at: Pretoria, South Africa
- Legal status: Nonprofit Company
- Purpose: Promotion of science, technology and the arts in Afrikaans
- Location: Pretoria, South Africa
- Fields: Science, Technology and the Arts
- Official language: Afrikaans
- Subsidiaries: Die Taalkommissie
- Website: www.akademie.co.za

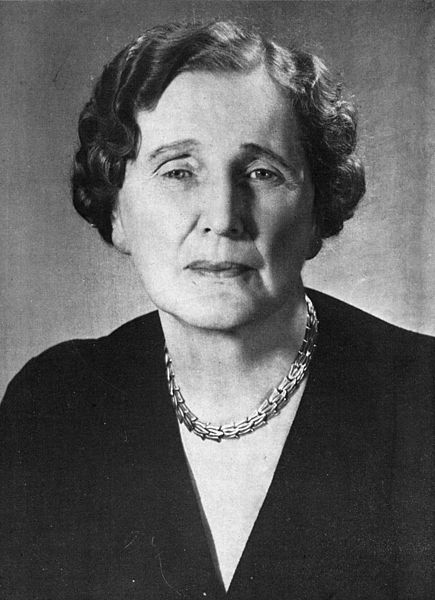
Mabel Jansen (née Pellissier), the academy's first female member.

The Suid-Afrikaanse Akademie vir Wetenskap en Kuns (SAAWK) (literally South African Academy for Science and Arts) is a multidisciplinary organization dedicated to promoting science, technology and the arts in Afrikaans, as well as promoting the use and quality of Afrikaans. The Hertzog Prize is awarded annually by the academy for high-quality literary work, while the Havenga prize is awarded annually for original research in the sciences.

Members are entitled to the post-nominal letters LAkadSA (if the correspondence is in Afrikaans) and MAkadSA (if the correspondence is in English).

== Origin ==
The initiative for the founding of the SAAWK came from General J. B. M. Hertzog who championed the Dutch-Afrikaans language. He suggested "dat een lichaam in 't leven worde geroepen ter bevordering van de Hollandse taal en letteren in Zuid-Afrika" (that one organisation be established to promote the Dutch language and literature in South Africa).

On 2 July 1909, the first 30 members of the body gathered to form the "Zuid-Afrikaanse Akademie voor Taal, Letteren en Kunst" (South African Academy for Language, Literature and Art). The aim of the academy was "The enforcement and promotion of Dutch Language and Literature, and of the South African History, Archeology and Art", with an addendum that Dutch implied both Dutch and Afrikaans, as both languages were common in South Africa at the time.

The name of the academy was changed to the Suid-Afrikaanse Akademie vir Wetenskap en Kuns in 1942 when a "science and technology" faculty was created.

Since then, it has been responsible for the establishment of, among others, the Simon van der Stel Foundation and the Africa Institute. Furthermore, the academy strives to promote interest in South African history, antiquities, art and Afrikaans language and literature. The academy has become known over the years because of the regular awarding of literary prizes (of which the Hertzog Prize is best known) and other prestigious awards such as the N. P. van Wyk Louw medal.

Honorary membership of the academy is regarded as an exceptionally high honour, although it is not accompanied by any prize or prize money. A person considered for honorary membership of the academy is nominated in recognition of exceptional service to South Africa, the Afrikaans language, or to the academy in particular.

== Change in status ==
In the early 1990s it was decided that a new organisation should be created to be the representative national science academy for South Africa. To this end the president of the Foundation for Research and Development invited the Royal Society of South Africa (RSSAf), the Suid-Afrikaanse Akademie vir Wetenskap en Kuns (SAAWK) and the Science and Engineering Academy of South Africa (SEASA) to jointly plan a new academy. This led to the creation of The Academy of Science of South Africa (ASSAf) in 1995. Act 67 of 2001, the ASSAf Statute, revoked the SAAWK statute and ASSAf became the only national science academy of South Africa.

In response to this the Suid-Afrikaanse Akademie vir Wetenskap en Kuns registered in 2002 as a Nonprofit company.

== Awards ==
Prizes, medals, awards of honorary membership and bursaries, as awarded by the academy, are listed below.

=== Prizes ===
- Hertzog Prize
- Eugène Marais Prize
- Scheepers Prize for Youth Literature
- SA Academy Prize for Translated Work
- Alba Bouwer Prize for Children's Literature
- Elsabe Steenberg Prize for Translated Children's and Youth Literature in Afrikaans
- C.J. Langenhoven prize for linguistics
- Gustav Preller Prize for Literature and Literary Criticism
- Toon van den Heever prize for jurisprudence
- DF du Toit-Malherbe Prize for Genealogical Research
- Stals prize
- Totius Prize for Theology and the study of the basics of the Bible
- Samuel Edward Mqhayi prize
- Olive Schreiner Prize for English Literature
- Havenga Prize
- Albert Strating Prize for Preventative Medicine
- FARMOVS Prize for Pharmacology and Drug Development
- Douw Greeff Prize
- Esther Greeff Prize
- Louis Hiemstra Prize for Non-fiction
- Huberte Rupert Prize for Classical Music
- CL Engelbrecht prize
- Protea Book House Prize for Best History Dissertation

=== Medals ===
- Tienie Holloway Medal for Kindergarten literature
- Markus Viljoen Medal for Journalistic Performance
- D.F. Malan medal
- Rev. Pieter van Drimmelen medal
- NP van Wyk Louw medal
- Elizabeth C. Steijn medal
- Frans du Toit Medal for Business Leadership
- Transnet Medal
- Gold Academy Medal for Natural Science and Technical Achievement
- MT Steyn Medal for Natural Science and Technical Achievement
- Senior Captain Scott Medal
- Junior Captain Scott Medal
- Christo Wiese Medal for an Emerging Entrepreneur

=== Awards of honorary membership ===
Awards are given in the following categories:

- Contributions to Afrikaans Radio dramatisations
- Contributions to Afrikaans Television Drama and Afrikaans Documentary Television Programmes
- Contributions to the academy
- Promotion of Scientific subjects
- Honorary membership of the Faculty of Natural Sciences and Technology

=== Other ===
- Elisabeth Eybers bursary
- Special bursaries

== See also ==
- Afrikaanse Woordelys en Spelreëls - Afrikaans words and spelling rules published by SAAWK
- S.P.E. Boshoff, 1950 – 1958 president
- Suid-Afrikaanse Akademie vir Wetenskap en Kuns in Afrikaans Wikipedia

== Sources ==
- Combrink, J.G.H. and Spies, J. SARA: Sakboek van regte Afrikaans (in Afrikaans), Tafelberg, Cape Town, 1994
- Kapp, P.H. Draer van 'n droom: die geskiedenis van die Suid-Afrikaanse Akademie vir Wetenskap en Kuns, 1909-2009 (in Afrikaans), ISBN 9780620438742 Hemel & See Boeke, Hermanus, 2009
- Nienaber, P.J.Op brandwag vir ons taal : die geskiedenis en werksaamhede van die Suid-Afrikaanse Akademie vir Wetenskap en Kuns (in Afrikaans), S.A. Akademie vir Wetenskap en Kuns, South Africa, 1950
