= D. F. Malherbe =

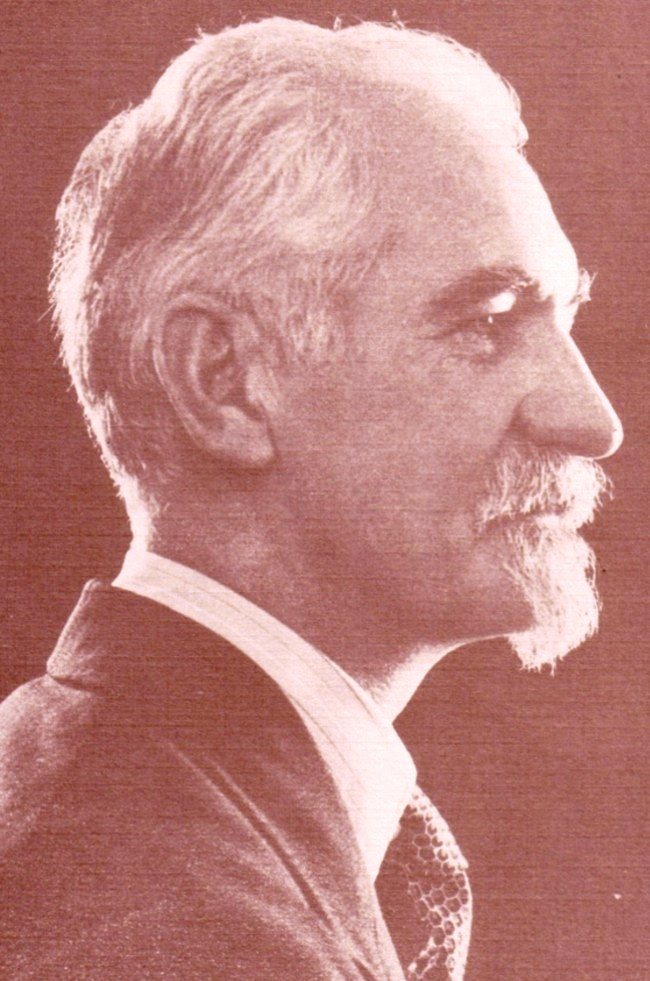
D.F. Malherbe

Daniël Francois Malherbe or (as he is generally known) D.F. Malherbe (28 May 1881 – 12 April 1969), was an Afrikaans-language novelist, poet, dramatist, and scholar.

He was born in Dal Josafat in the Cape Colony, now Western Cape Province, South Africa.

Malherbe is most noted for having written what is regarded as the first novel of artistic value in Afrikaans, Vergeet niet (Do Not Forget). His Biblical novels--Die Hart van Moab (The Heart of Moab, 1933), Saul die worstelheld (Saul the Struggle Hero, 1935), and Die profeet (The Prophet, 1937) draw a parallel between the Afrikaners and the Israelites of the Old Testament, yet today they are lightly regarded. Malherbe was also active in the promotion of Afrikaans.

The D.F. Malherbe High School in 14th Avenue, Walmer, Port Elizabeth, South Africa is named after him as well as the D.F. Malherbe Primary School in Vanderbijlpark, South Africa.
