= Comparison of Afrikaans and Dutch =

Dutch and Afrikaans geographical distribution: Dark green (left): largest Dutch speaking regions – Dutch Caribbean, French Flanders, Suriname, Netherlands, Belgium; Light green (right): primary Afrikaans speaking regions – South Africa, Namibia

Afrikaans is a daughter language of Dutch mainly spoken in South Africa and Namibia; it is a separate standard language rather than a national variety, unlike Netherlands Dutch, Belgian Dutch, Indonesian Dutch, and Surinamese Dutch. An estimated 90 to 95% of Afrikaans vocabulary is ultimately of Dutch origin, so there are few lexical differences between the two languages; however, Afrikaans has considerably more regular morphology, grammar, and spelling.

== Mutual intelligibility ==
There is a high degree of mutual intelligibility between the two languages, particularly in written form. Research suggests that mutual intelligibility between Dutch and Afrikaans is better than between Dutch and Frisian or between Danish and Swedish. Mutual intelligibility tends to be asymmetrical, as it is easier for Dutch speakers to understand Afrikaans than for Afrikaans speakers to understand Dutch.

=== Intelligibility of Afrikaans to Dutch speakers ===
==== Cognate words ====
Although Afrikaans borrows some lexical and syntactical structures from other languages, including Malay, Portuguese, Khoisan languages, Bantu languages, and to a lesser extent Low German, Dutch speakers are confronted with fewer non-cognates when listening to Afrikaans than the other way around.

In Afrikaans, het is an inflection of the verb hê ("to have" from Dutch hebben) although sy (cognate with zijn) is used as the subjunctive of "to be", while we in Dutch is cognate with "we" in English, a language widely understood by Afrikaans speakers. Conversely, wees, meaning "to be" in Afrikaans, is used as the imperative in Dutch as in Afrikaans (e.g. wees betyds, meaning "be on time").

==== Verb forms ====
The simplification of verbs in Afrikaans, with almost all verbs being regular and the near absence of the imperfect tense, means that while the phrase ek het gehelp ("I have helped" or "I helped") would be recognisable by Dutch speakers, the Dutch phrase ik hielp would not be as readily understood by speakers of Afrikaans.

Similarly, the resemblance of Afrikaans verbs like lees ("to read", Dutch lezen) to the first person singular and verbs like gaan ("to go") to infinitive forms in Dutch means that julle lees ("you [plural] read") or ek gaan ("I go") would be understood by Dutch speakers more readily than jullie lezen or ik ga would be by Afrikaans speakers.

==== Unmarked and marked forms of words ====
As Afrikaans no longer has unmarked and marked forms of words, instead using words derived from the marked forms in Dutch, the Afrikaans words for "there" and "now", daar and nou, are more intelligible to speakers of Dutch than the unmarked Dutch forms er and nu are to Afrikaans speakers.

For example, nou is daar, meaning "now there is" in Afrikaans, is sometimes encountered in Dutch although nou is used more colloquially for emphasis, in the sense of the English "well". In Dutch, "now there is" would be translated as nu is er, using the unmarked forms, which do not exist in Afrikaans.

=== Intelligibility of Dutch to Afrikaans speakers ===
==== Loanwords vs purisms ====
Afrikaans uses purisms or calques where Dutch would use loans from French, Latin or English. Owing to the exposure of Afrikaans speakers to English, Dutch words like computer, lift and appartement are more readily understood by them than Afrikaans equivalents like rekenaar, hysbak and woonstel are by Dutch speakers.

Similarly, Dutch words such as favoriet ("favourite"), film, and station are intelligible to Afrikaans speakers on account of their resemblance to their English equivalents, whereas the Afrikaans gunsteling, rolprent, and stasie (cognate with Dutch statie), while intelligible to Dutch speakers, would be considered old-fashioned.

==== Words of Dutch and non-Dutch origin ====
In addition, while Afrikaans may use words of non-Dutch origin unintelligible to Dutch speakers (such as those derived from Malay, like baie), their Dutch equivalents, or cognates, are also used in Afrikaans, and would therefore be more intelligible to Dutch speakers.

For example, although Afrikaans baie ("very", "many" or "much"), from banyak has no cognate in Dutch, heel as in heel goed ("very good") is used in Afrikaans as well as Dutch. The Dutch word amper ("scarcely" or "sour") is unrelated to the Afrikaans word amper ("almost" or "nearly"), being derived from the Malay hampir, but the Dutch word bijna, also meaning "almost" or "nearly", is cognate with byna in Afrikaans.

== Orthographic differences ==
Orthographic differences between Dutch and Afrikaans are mainly due to phonetic evolutions and spelling simplifications in Afrikaans, and the more conservative character of and recent changes to modern Dutch orthography.

However, some aspects of Afrikaans orthography also resemble those of older forms of Dutch, for example, whereas "God be with you" in modern Dutch would be God zij met u, the Afrikaans spelling God sy met u, was also used in 18th century Dutch. The current Dutch spelling, using ⟨z⟩ and the digraph ⟨ij⟩, became prevalent from the 19th century.

Other simplifications in Afrikaans had earlier been proposed for Dutch by R.A Kollewijn, but were either not adopted until 1934, such as changing ⟨sch⟩ to ⟨s⟩ (hence Nederlandsch to Nederlands), or rejected, such as changing ⟨isch⟩ to ⟨ies⟩ (hence logisch to logies) and ⟨ijk⟩ to ⟨ik⟩ (hence moeilijk to moeilik).

=== Afrikaans simplifications ===
==== Replacement of ⟨c⟩ and ⟨ch⟩ ====
Afrikaans uses ⟨k⟩ for the Dutch hard ⟨c⟩, both pronounced [ k ]; compare Dutch cultuur ("culture") with Afrikaans kultuur. Before the 1990s major spelling reform, the latter spelling was also accepted in Dutch, although other Dutch words such as commissie ("commission") were already spelt with ⟨c⟩, which in Afrikaans would be kommissie.

Words in Dutch with the letter combination ⟨cc⟩, when pronounced as [ kk ] are transliterated in Afrikaans using ⟨kk⟩, for example, acclimatiseren and accommodatie in Dutch become Afrikaans akklimatiseer and akkommodasie ("akkommodasie" is used for all meanings of "accommodation" except "a place to stay"; for that meaning, the most accepted word is "verblyf", cognate with Dutch "verblijf"). Those in which ⟨cc⟩ is pronounced as ⟨ks⟩, such as Dutch accent and accepteren, become aksent and aksepteer in Afrikaans ("aksepteer" is very rare, and typically rejected; the accepted translation of "accept" is "aanvaar", cognate with Dutch "aanvaarden").

Similarly, Afrikaans uses ⟨s⟩ for the Dutch soft ⟨c⟩, both pronounced [ s ]; compare Dutch centraal ("central") and ceremonie ("ceremony") with Afrikaans sentraal and seremonie. Afrikaans also uses ⟨s⟩ instead of ⟨c⟩ in words like spesiaal ("special") and spesifiek ("specific") which in Dutch would be speciaal and specifiek.

Most Afrikaans words using ⟨c⟩ begin with the digraph ⟨ch⟩, pronounced [ x ], such as Christelik ("Christian") or chemie ("chemistry") with some exceptions like confetti, although Afrikaans dictionaries may also list more phonetic alternative spellings using ⟨k⟩ or ⟨sj⟩, such as kronies for chronies ("chronic", similar to Dutch chronisch) and sjirurg for chirurg ("surgeon").

However, although the Dutch words China and Chinees (inflected as Chinese) are transliterated in Afrikaans using ⟨sj⟩ as Sjina, Sjinees, and Sjinese respectively, the Dutch spellings are also used, particularly in the media. In some Afrikaans dictionaries, China is standard, while Sjinees is listed as an alternative spelling to Chinees.

==== Transliteration of loanwords ====
French loanwords in Dutch beginning in ⟨ch⟩ (pronounced [ ʃ ]), are transliterated in Afrikaans using ⟨sj⟩; compare Dutch champagne and chic with Afrikaans sjampanje and sjiek. Afrikaans also changes ⟨gn⟩, encountered in French loanwords in Dutch like campagne and compagnie to ⟨nj⟩, hence kampanje and kompanjie, and "sjampanje", in which both these changes are seen.

When ⟨ch⟩ (pronounced [ ʃ ]) appears within a Dutch word, in its Afrikaans equivalent, it is replaced by ⟨sj⟩; compare machine with masjien. This also applies to word endings; compare Dutch Jiddisch ("Yiddish") with Afrikaans Jiddisj, although the latter is also encountered in Dutch. In Dutch, hasjiesj ("hashish") is always written with ⟨sj⟩ similar to hasjisj in Afrikaans.

The Dutch word cheque, in which ⟨ch⟩ is pronounced as [ tʃ ], is written in Afrikaans as tjek, while the Italian-derived word cello is written as tjello. Both languages also use ⟨tsj⟩ (also pronounced as [ tʃ ]) in some geographical names, despite other differences in spelling; compare Dutch Tsjaad ("Chad") with Afrikaans Tsjad.

==== Use of ⟨k⟩ instead of soft ⟨c⟩ ====
Another difference between the two languages concerns verbs derived from Latin or French, with Dutch using a soft ⟨c⟩ ([s]) and Afrikaans using ⟨k⟩, hence communiceren and provoceren ("to communicate" and "to provoke") in Dutch become kommunikeer and provokeer in Afrikaans, although kommuniseren was also used in 18th century Dutch.

The word kommuniseer was also previously used in Afrikaans to mean kommunisties maak or "to make communist". However, provoseer is accepted as a synonym for provokeer. Similarly, the verb kompliseer, similar to Dutch compliceren, is used to mean "to complicate", both using the [s] sound.

By contrast, related nouns in both languages contain the [k] sound, hence communicatie and provocatie in Dutch and kommunikasie and provokasie in Afrikaans.

==== Changes to digraph ⟨ij⟩ ====
The Dutch digraph ⟨ij⟩ corresponds to ⟨y⟩ in Afrikaans, in line with older Dutch spelling norms, although pronunciation remains [ɛi]. An example is prijs (price), which is spelt prys in Afrikaans. Dutch words ending in ⟨lijk⟩, however, end in ⟨lik⟩ in Afrikaans, not ⟨lyk⟩, for example lelijk (ugly) in Dutch becomes lelik in Afrikaans. In both languages, this suffix is pronounced [lək], with a schwa.

In Dutch, in which ⟨ij⟩ is treated as a separate letter of the alphabet, IJ often features in place names in the Netherlands like IJsselmeer, or in the Dutch name for Iceland, IJsland. Afrikaans similarly uses Ysland, which was also used in 18th century Dutch.

However, few place names in South Africa of Dutch origin begin with Y, with the exception of Yzerfontein in the Western Cape. The spelling of the name of the town, which means iron fountain, is based on the old Dutch word for iron, yzer. It was also previously written as Ijsterfontein. The modern Afrikaans word for iron is yster, while in Dutch it is ijzer.

In modern Dutch, ⟨y⟩ is now typically used in words of Greek origin like cyclus ("cycle") replaced by ⟨i⟩ in its Afrikaans equivalent siklus, although both are pronounced as [i].

==== Mergers of digraphs or trigraphs ====
Afrikaans merged Dutch trigraphs ⟨tie⟩, ⟨cie⟩ and ⟨sie⟩ to a single spelling ⟨sie⟩. Apart from ⟨tie⟩, generally pronounced as [tsi] in the Netherlands, there is no difference in pronunciation; compare Dutch provincie ("province") and politie ("police") with Afrikaans provinsie and polisie. However, words ending in ⟨tie⟩ in Dutch are often pronounced as [si] particularly in Flanders.

Afrikaans merged Dutch digraphs and trigraphs ⟨ou⟩, ⟨ouw⟩, ⟨au⟩, and ⟨auw⟩ (pronounced identically as /ɔu/ by many Dutch speakers) to a single spelling ⟨ou⟩, (contrastingly pronounced /œu/); vrouw ("woman") and dauw ("dew") in Dutch become vrou and dou in Afrikaans respectively. Similarly, some Dutch words beginning with ⟨au⟩, such as autonomie are written with ⟨ou⟩, hence outonomie.

The Dutch cluster ⟨tion⟩ became ⟨sion⟩ in Afrikaans. Compare nationaal ("national") with nasionaal. In Dutch, the pronunciation differs from region to region and include [tsiɔn], [siɔn], and [ʃon].

Conversely, the Afrikaans cluster ⟨si⟩ in words such as spesiaal ("special") and pensioen ("pension") is pronounced as [ʃi] with an extra syllable ⟨i⟩, but in Dutch, both the ⟨ci⟩ in speciaal and ⟨si⟩ in pensioen are pronounced as [ʃ], although the pronunciation [ʃj] is encountered in the Southern Netherlands.

==== Dropping of final letters ====
At the end of words, Afrikaans often dropped the ⟨n⟩ in the Dutch cluster ⟨en⟩ (pronounced as a schwa, [ə]), mainly present in plural nouns and verb forms, to become ⟨e⟩ Compare Dutch leven (life) and mensen (people) to Afrikaans lewe and mense. Also in Dutch, final -n is often deleted after a schwa, but the occurrence and frequency of this phenomenon varies between speakers, and it is not recognised in spelling.

=== Phonetically induced spelling differences ===
==== Simplification of consonant clusters ====
Afrikaans has frequently simplified consonant clusters in final position that are still present in Dutch, although they are used in inflected forms of adjectives, for example, bes ("best") in Afrikaans is still inflected as beste, as in Dutch, hence beste man ooit (best man ever) is correct in both languages.

At the end of words, the Dutch cluster ⟨cht⟩ was reduced in Afrikaans to ⟨g⟩, with lucht ("air", pronounced [lʏxt]) in Dutch becoming lug ([ləχ]) in Afrikaans, lugt being an older spelling in Dutch. Similarly, ⟨st⟩ dienst (service, pronounced [dinst]) was reduced to diens ([dins]) in Afrikaans. Between two vowels, ⟨cht⟩ is replaced with ⟨gg⟩; compare Dutch echtgenoot ("husband") with Afrikaans eggenoot.

Similarly, whereas Dutch words like technologie ("technology") and monarchie ("monarchy") contain ⟨ch⟩ (in this case pronounced as [χ]) their Afrikaans equivalents use ⟨g⟩, hence tegnologie and monargie. In other cases, ⟨ch⟩ is replaced with ⟨gg⟩, compare Tsjechische Republiek ("Czech Republic") in Dutch with Tsjeggiese Republiek in Afrikaans.

At the end of words, Dutch cluster ⟨ct⟩ was reduced to ⟨k⟩ in Afrikaans, hence Dutch contact and perfect with Afrikaans kontak and perfek. Similarly, ⟨ctie⟩ in Dutch (pronounced [ktsi]) is replaced by ⟨ksie⟩ (pronounced [ksi]); compare reactie ("reaction") and connectie ("connection") in Dutch with reaksie and konneksie in Afrikaans.

==== Consonant mergers ====
As a result of Afrikaans merging Dutch consonants ⟨z⟩ and ⟨s⟩ to a single sound [s], spelt ⟨s⟩, the use of ⟨z⟩ in Afrikaans is confined to words of non-Dutch origin, such as Zoeloe ("Zulu") and zero, or country names like Zambië ("Zambia"), while use of ⟨z⟩ is preserved only in Dutch place names in South Africa like Zonnebloem and Zeerust.

However, although Suid-Afrika ("South Africa") is used in Afrikaans rather than Zuid-Afrika as in Dutch, South Africa adopted "ZA" as its international vehicle registration code in 1936, which later became the country's ISO country code, with .za becoming the country's internet domain.

In the middle of words, Afrikaans merged Dutch ⟨v⟩ and ⟨w⟩ to a single sound [v] and consequently to a single spelling, ⟨w⟩. Compare Dutch haven (port) with Afrikaans hawe, both pronounced [ɦɑːvə]. Meanwhile, at the beginning of words, ⟨v⟩ became devoiced to /f/ in Afrikaans (except in words of Latin origin, like visueel).

Afrikaans merged Dutch fricatives ⟨ch⟩ and ⟨g⟩ to a single sound [χ], spelt ⟨g⟩, except when preceded by ⟨s⟩, in which case ⟨sk⟩ (pronounced as spelt) is used where Dutch uses ⟨sch⟩ (pronounced [sx], [sχ] or [sç]; hence "school" is school in Dutch but skool in Afrikaans, but Dutch misschien ("maybe") is written with ⟨ss⟩, while Afrikaans miskien is written with ⟨s⟩.

Consonant comparison between Standard Dutch and Afrikaans
Pronunciation		Examples	
Standard Dutch	Afrikaans	Standard Dutch	Afrikaans
z /z/ voiced s /z/	s /s/	zuid /ˈzœʏ̯t/ analyse /aːnaːˈliːzə/	suid /ˈsœɪ̯t/ analise /ɑːnɑːˈliːsə/
starting v /v/	/f/	vier /ˈvir/	vier /ˈfir/
middle v /v/	w /v/	haven /ˈɦaːvən/	hawe /ˈɦɑːvə/
v (for Latin and French loanwords) /v/	v, w /v/	visueel /vizyˈeːl/ conservatief /kɔnsɛrvaːtif/	visueel /visyˈɪəl/ konserwatief /kɔnsɛrvɑːtif/
w /ʋ/	/v, w/	weet /ˈʋeːt/ kwaad /ˈkʋaːt/ wraak /ˈvraːk/	weet /ˈvɪət/ kwaad /ˈkwɑːt/ wraak /ˈvrɑːk/
ch /x/ g /ɣ/	g /χ/	acht /ˈɑxt/ gat /ˈɣɑt/	agt /ˈaχt/ gat /ˈχat/
sch /sx/	sk /sk/	school /ˈsxoːl/	skool /ˈskʊəl/
-rgen /-rɣən/	-rge /-rgə/	bergen /ˈbɛrɣə(n)/	berge /ˈbɛrgə/
-rv- /-rv/	-rw- /-rv/	sterven /ˈstɛrvə(n)/	sterwe /ˈstɛrvə/
-tie /-tsi, -si/	-sie /-si/	actie /ˈɑksi/	aksie /ˈaksi/
-st /-st/	-s /-s/	best /ˈbɛst/	bes /ˈbɛs/
-cht /-xt/	-g /-χ/	lucht, echtgenoot /ˈlʏxt, ˈɛxtxənoːt/	lug, eggenoot /ˈlœχ, ˈɛχənʊət/
-ct /-kt/	-k /-k/	contact /ˈkɔntɑkt/	kontak /ˈkɔntak/
-isch /-is/	-ies /-is/	Tsjechisch /ˈtʃɛxis/	Tsjeggies /ˈtʃɛχis/

==== Consonant omissions ====
Between two vowels, the Dutch ⟨g⟩ is omitted in Afrikaans; hence Dutch uses hoger ("higher"), pronounced [ˈɦoːɣər] and "regen" ("rain"), pronounced [ˈreː.ɣə(n)] while Afrikaans uses hoër ([ˈɦuə̯r]) and reën ([ˈrɪə̯n]), in which the second vowel requires a trema to avoid confusion with the digraphs ⟨oe⟩ ([u(ː)]) and ⟨ee⟩ ([ɪə]).

This also applies to Afrikaans nouns that, while ending in ⟨g⟩ as in Dutch, end with ⟨eë⟩ in the plural; while "railway" in both languages is spoorweg, "railways" is spoorwegen in Dutch ([spoːrʋeːɣə(n)]) but spoorweë ([spʊərvɪə̯]) in Afrikaans.

Between two vowels, Dutch ⟨v⟩ is omitted in Afrikaans; compare Dutch avond ("evening"), pronounced [ˈaː.vɔnt] and over ("over"), pronounced [ˈoːvər], with Afrikaans aand ([ɑːnt]) and oor ([ʊər]), with ⟨aa⟩ and ⟨oo⟩ being [ɑː] and [ʊə] respectively. In Afrikaans, as in Dutch, oor also means "ear".

Where ⟨ov⟩ precedes final ⟨en⟩ in Dutch, as in boven ("above") pronounced [boːvən] and geloven ("believe") pronounced [ɣəˈloːvə(n)], in Afrikaans they merge to form the diphthong [ʊə], resulting in bo ([bʊə]) and glo ([χlʊə]). Similarly, open and samen ("together") in Dutch become oop ([ʊəp]), and saam ([sɑːm]) in Afrikaans.

At the end of words, Dutch ⟨g⟩ is sometimes omitted in Afrikaans, which opens up the preceding vowel (usually a short ⟨e⟩) now written with a circumflex. For example, the Dutch verb form zeg ("say", pronounced [zɛx]) became sê ([sɛː]) in Afrikaans, as did the infinitive zeggen, pronounced [ˈzɛɣə(n)]. Another example is the Dutch leggen ("to lay", pronounced [lɛɣə(n)]), which becomes lê ([lɛː]) in Afrikaans.

Alternatively, Dutch verb form vraag ("ask", pronounced [ˈvraːɣ]) became vra ([ˈfrɑː]) in Afrikaans, which is also the equivalent of the Dutch verb vragen, "to ask". Unlike Dutch, vraag in Afrikaans, pronounced [ˈfrɑːχ], is only used as a noun meaning "question", with vrae, pronounced [ˈfrɑːə], being the plural form.

The word for "day" in both languages is dag, but whereas the plural in Dutch is dagen ([daːɣə(n)]), in Afrikaans it is dae ([dɑːə]). By contrast, wagen or "wagon" in Dutch, pronounced [ˈʋaːɣə(n)], became wa in Afrikaans, ([ˈvɑː]), with the plural form, wagens, pronounced [ˈʋaːɣəns], became waens ([ˈvɑːəns]).

==== Circumflex ====
In contrast to Dutch, where the use of the circumflex is essentially limited to French borrowings, like enquête, Afrikaans makes frequent use of ⟨ê⟩, ⟨ô⟩, and ⟨û⟩; examples include nêrens ("nowhere", Dutch nergens), môre ("morning", Dutch morgen), and brûe ("bridges", Dutch bruggen).

As a result of the disappearance of consonants found in equivalent Dutch words, particularly ⟨g⟩, Afrikaans uses circumflexes with single vowel letters in open syllables to indicate the long monophthongal pronunciations [ɛː], [ɔː], and [œː], as opposed to the vowel letters without a circumflex, pronounced as [ɪə], [ʊə] and [yː], respectively.

The circumflex is also used in ⟨î⟩, appearing only in wîe ("wedges", Dutch wiggen), where it denotes a long pronunciation [əː], keeping the digraph ⟨ie⟩ from being pronounced i.

==== Diminutive ====
In diminutive forms, Afrikaans uses ⟨tjie⟩ and ⟨etjie⟩ (normally pronounced [kʲi] or [ikʲi], where Standard Dutch would use ⟨tje⟩ (pronounced [cə] or [t͡ʃə]). For example, whereas the diminutive of beet ("bit") in Dutch would be beetje (pronounced [beːt͡ʃə]), in Afrikaans only the diminutive exists and is written bietjie (pronounced [bikʲi]).

In Belgium and the Southern Netherlands, the diminutive is often realised as [(s)kə] in the spoken language. This ending is also found in some varieties of Dutch Low Saxon, a group of dialects spoken in the Northeastern Netherlands. Conversely, in the Western Cape, it is common to hear it realised as [tji]. The diminutive of words ending in ⟨k⟩ in Afrikaans is ⟨ie⟩, hence whereas doek in Dutch becomes doekje, in Afrikaans, it becomes doekie.

Where Dutch would use ⟨je⟩, ⟨pje⟩ and ⟨mpje⟩ (pronounced [jə], [pjə] and [mpjə]) Afrikaans would use ⟨ie⟩, ⟨pie⟩ and ⟨mpie⟩ (pronounced [i], [pi] and [mpi]) hence the diminutives of glas, kop and probleem in Dutch would become glaasje, kopje and probleempje, while in Afrikaans they would be glasie, koppie and probleempie, with an extra ⟨p⟩ being added to kop. The ⟨ie(n)⟩ ending is also found in some varieties of Dutch Low Saxon: glassie(n), koppie(n), probleempie(n). In addition, the ⟨ie⟩ diminutive is used in Hollands dialects such as that of Amsterdam as well as in less formal registers of general Dutch. "A cute little face", for instance, can be rendered as Een schattig koppie.

Other words formed from diminutives in Dutch ending in ⟨tje⟩ may have different equivalents in Afrikaans; for example, the Dutch term of endearment schatje (the diminutive of schat or "sweetheart", literally "treasure") can be either skattie or skatjie. The latter is the only form used as the diminutive of a literal treasure.

In both languages, the word for "niece" is a diminutive of the word for "female cousin", but owing to the simplification of consonant clusters in Afrikaans, nig becomes niggie, using ⟨gie⟩ in contrast to Dutch, in which nicht becomes nichtje. The adjectives saggies and zachtjes, both meaning "softly", are diminutives of Afrikaans sag and Dutch zacht respectively.

=== Other spelling differences ===
Unlike Dutch, the names of months in Afrikaans are capitalised, hence 2 June 2016 would be written as 2 Junie 2016, whereas in Dutch, it would be written as 2 juni 2016.

== Phonetic differences ==
Afrikaans pronunciation tends to be closest to the dialects of the province of South Holland, in particular that of Zoetermeer.

=== Consonant mergers ===
Afrikaans merged Dutch consonants ⟨z⟩ and ⟨s⟩ to a single sound [s], spelt ⟨s⟩, with zorg ("care") and zout ("salt") in Dutch becoming sorg and sout in Afrikaans. A similar phonetic evolution can be found in the Northern Netherlands.

At the start of words, Afrikaans often merged Dutch voiced [v] with voiceless [f], as in ver ("far"), pronounced [fɛr] in Afrikaans and [vɛr] in Standard Dutch. The same merger is present though in the areas around Amsterdam, where all voiced consonants merged with the voiceless ones, pronounced as the latter ones.

Afrikaans merged Dutch voiced [w] with voiced [v], as in werk ("work"), pronounced [vɛrk] in Afrikaans and [wɛrk] in Belgium and Suriname or [ʋɛrk] in the Netherlands. A similar near-assimilation of ⟨w⟩ to ⟨v⟩ can also be found in the Northern Netherlands, where ⟨w⟩ is pronounced [ʋ], and ⟨v⟩ [v].

=== Fricative mergers ===
In Afrikaans, Dutch fricatives ⟨ch⟩ and ⟨g⟩ were merged to a single sound [χ]. A similar phonetic evolution can be heard in the Northern Netherlands, where the sounds have also been merged to [χ] or [x], although the spelling difference has been retained. In Belgium and Suriname, however, the phonetic distinction between ⟨ch⟩ and ⟨g⟩ has been preserved.

Afrikaans uses only [sk] (written as ⟨sk⟩) in initial syllables where Dutch uses [sx], [sχ] or [sç] (written as ⟨sch⟩), hence skoonheid ("beauty") in Afrikaans is schoonheid in Dutch. However, in some Dutch varieties, such as Southern West Flemish and certain dialects of Dutch Low Saxon, ⟨sk⟩ can also be heard word-medially as well as syllable-initially.

=== Vowels ===
Vowel comparison between Dutch and Afrikaans
Pronunciation		Examples	
Dutch	Afrikaans	Dutch	Afrikaans
short a /ɑ/	/a/	kat /ˈkɑt/	kat /ˈkat/
long a /aː/	/ɑː/	kaart /ˈkaːrt/	kaart /ˈkɑːrt/
short e /ɛ/	/ɛ/	bed /ˈbɛt/	
long e /eː/	/ɪə/	weet /ˈʋeːt/	weet /ˈvɪət/
eu /øː/	/ɪø/	neus /ˈnøːs/	neus /ˈnɪøs/
short i /ɪ/	/ə, ɪ/	kind, Indië /ˈkɪnt, ˈɪndiə/	kind, Indië /ˈkənt, ˈɪndiə/
long i, ie /i/	/i/	dief /ˈdif/	
short o /ɔ/	/ɔ/	bok /ˈbɔk/	
long o /oː/	/ʊə/	brood /ˈbroːt/	brood /ˈbrʊət/
short oe /u/	/ʊ/	boek /ˈbuk/	boek /ˈbʊk/
long oe /uː/	/u/	boer /ˈbuːr/	boer /ˈbuːr/
short u /ʏ/	/œ/	kus /ˈkʏs/	kus /ˈkœs/
short u /y/	/y/	u /ˈy/	u /ˈy/
long u /yː/	/yː/	duur /ˈdyːr/	duur /ˈdyr/
ai /ɑi̯/	/aɪ̯/	ai /ˈɑi̯/	ai /ˈaɪ̯/
aai /aːi̯/	/ɑːɪ̯/	haai /ˈhaːi̯/	haai /ˈhɑːɪ̯/
au, auw /ɑu̯/	ou /œʊ̯/	rauw ˈrɑu̯/	rou /ˈrœʊ̯/
ou, ouw /ɔu̯/	ou /œʊ̯/	koud, rouw ˈkɔu̯t, ˈrɔu̯/	koud, rou /ˈkœʊ̯t, ˈrœʊ̯/
ei /ɛi̯/ ij /ɛi̯/	ei /əɪ̯/ y /əɪ̯/	eiland /ˈɛi̯lɑnt/ hij /ˈhɛi̯/	eiland /ˈəɪ̯lant/ hy /ˈhəɪ̯/
eeu, eeuw /eːʊ̯/	eeu /iʊ̯/	leeuw /ˈleːu̯/	leeu /ˈliʊ̯/
ieu, ieuw /iu̯/	ieu /iʊ̯/	kieuw /ˈkiu̯/	kieu /ˈkiʊ̯/
oei /ui̯/	/uɪ̯/	groei /ˈɣrui̯/	groei /ˈχruɪ̯/
ooi /oːi̯/	/oːɪ̯/	mooi /ˈmoːi̯/	mooi /ˈmoːɪ̯/
ui /œy̯/	/œɪ̯/	huis /ˈhœy̯s/	huis /ˈhœɪ̯s/
uw /yu̯/	u /y/	schaduw /ˈsxaːdyu̯/	skadu /ˈskɑːdy/

== Grammatical differences ==
Grammatical differences are arguably the most considerable difference between Afrikaans and Dutch, as a result of the loss of inflections in Afrikaans, as well as the loss of some verb tenses, leading to it being greatly simplified in its grammar compared to Dutch.

Unlike Dutch, Afrikaans has no grammatical gender, and therefore only has one form of the definite article die, while standard Dutch has two (de for both masculine and feminine nouns and het for neuter ones) and Dutch dialects in the Southern Netherlands have a third, den, used for masculine nouns.

The verb "to be" in Afrikaans is wees (from Dutch wezen); the Dutch zijn only survives in Afrikaans in the form of the subjunctive sy, as in God sy met u ("God be with you"). In Dutch, as in Afrikaans, wees is used as an imperative, hence wees sterk! ("be strong!") while wezen is used as a less formal form of to be than zijn.

=== Verb conjugations ===
In Afrikaans verbs, the same form is generally used for both the infinitive and the present tense, with the exception of wees ("to be") conjugated as is and hê ("to have") conjugated as het, and there is no inflection for person; contrast ek gaan ("I go") with ik ga, hy doen ("he does") with hij doet, and julle was ("you (plural) were") with jullie waren.

The past participle is usually regularly formed by adding the prefix ge- to the verb, hence gedoen ("done") is formed from doen in Afrikaans, although Dutch gedaan survives in Afrikaans as welgedaan! ("well done!") One exception is the verb hê ("to have") of which the past participle is gehad, while sometimes an irregular past participle is used with the verb dink ("to think") hence hy het gedag or hy het gedog, similar to Dutch hij heeft gedacht, instead of hy het gedink (although the strong form is only used in the sense of "he thought wrongly").

Verbs that already have certain prefixes use the existing form unchanged as the past participle. For example, "to pay" is betaal and "I have paid" is "ek het betaal", while "to translate" is "vertaal" and "he has translated" is hy het vertaal; Dutch would use betaald (from betalen) and vertaald (from vertalen) respectively.

=== Verb tenses ===
Afrikaans has dropped the simple past tense for all but a few verbs, of which five are modal. For example, kon ("could") from kan ("can") and moes ("should") from moet ("must"). Instead, it generally uses either the present perfect or the present tense (depending on context), with the latter being used as the historical present. It has also lost the pluperfect (conjugated using had), being replaced by the present perfect (with het as the helper verb) instead.

Consequently, the sentence ek het die boek vir haar gegee in Afrikaans can be translated into Dutch as ik heb het boek aan haar gegeven ("I have given the book to her") ik gaf het boek aan haar ("I gave the book to her") or ik had het boek aan haar gegeven ("I had given the book to her").

However, the verb dink ("to think") still makes use of a simple past tense; for example, instead of ek het gedink to mean "I thought", ek dag or ek dog, similar to Dutch ik dacht, is sometimes used instead.

Whereas Dutch distinguishes between verbs that use zijn ("to be") and verbs that use hebben ("to have") in the present perfect, Afrikaans has dropped this distinction, instead using hê ("to have"), hence "he has been" is hy het al gewees in Afrikaans, while hij is geweest would be used in Dutch. In Dutch Low Saxon, hebben is found in the present perfect as well: hi'j hef (e)west.

The past tense of the passive voice in Afrikaans uses is, the present tense of wees instead of word, hence dit word geskryf ("it is written") becomes dit is geskryf ("it was/has been written"). In Dutch, the passive voice can be constructed by both zijn and worden, hence het is/wordt geschreven, and het was/werd geschreven.

Dutch, like English, has a continuous tense using the verb zijn ("to be") with aan het ("on the") and the infinitive, hence "I am reading" is ik ben aan het lezen, which may be expressed periphrastically in Afrikaans as ek is besig om te lees (literally "I am busy of to read") or "I am busy reading". However, a similar grammatical construction may be found in Afrikaans using wees ("to be") and aan die ("on the") as in ek is aan die werk ("I am working"), though this is less common than ek werk ("I work"/"I am working").

=== Omitting of subordinate conjunctions ===
In Afrikaans, as in English, it is possible to omit the subordinate conjunction dat ("that"); for example, the phrase "I believe [that] she has done it" can be translated into Afrikaans as either ek glo dat sy dit gedoen het or ek glo sy het dit gedoen (note the change in position of the auxiliary verb het), but in Dutch it is not possible to do so, hence the sentence would be translated as ik geloof dat ze het gedaan heeft.

=== Merger of marked and unmarked forms of words ===
Whereas Dutch has unmarked and marked forms for pronouns, adverbs and indicatives, Afrikaans uses only one form; for example, whereas Dutch uses er to mean "here" or "there", Afrikaans only uses hier for "here" and daar for "there", as well as hiervan ("hereof") for "of this/these" and daarvan ("thereof") for "of that/those/them", not ervan as in Dutch.

Pronouns in Afrikaans, whether subjects, objects or possessives, usually have only one form, derived from the Dutch marked forms; compare my in Afrikaans, which can be used either as the object "me" or the possessive "my", with Dutch marked forms mij and mijn, the unmarked forms being me for "me" and m'n for "my" respectively. Whereas Dutch uses the term van mij, van jou, van hem, van haar, van ons, van jullie. to mean "mine", "yours", "his", "her", "ours" and "theirs" respectively, Afrikaans uses myne, joune, syne, hare, ons s'n, and hulle s'n.

Dutch uses an apostrophe in some unmarked possessive pronouns instead of the digraph ⟨ij⟩, hence zijn "his" or "its" becomes z'n, whereas in Afrikaans, sy is not abbreviated. In Afrikaans sy also means "she", but Dutch equivalents ze (unmarked) and zij (marked) mean either "she" as in ze/zij is ("she is"), or "they", as in ze/zij zijn ("they are").

Similarly, Afrikaans uses only jy as the subject "you" (singular) where Dutch uses je or jij, jou as the object "you" where Dutch uses je or jou, and as the possessive "your" where Dutch would use jou or jouw.

=== Personal pronouns ===
Afrikaans, unlike Dutch, has no unmarked or marked forms of pronouns; whereas Dutch distinguishes between je/jij and ze/zij for "you" (singular) and "she" as subject pronouns, Afrikaans uses only jy and sy, while whereas me/mij and je/jou are the Dutch unmarked or marked forms of object pronouns for "me" and "you", Afrikaans only uses my and jou.

It also lacks the distinction between the subject and object form for plural personal pronouns; the first person plural pronoun in Afrikaans differs markedly from Dutch, with ons meaning either "we" or "us", in contrast to Dutch we and wij, hence "we go to the beach" is ons gaan na die strand as opposed to we gaan naar het strand.

Similarly, the third person plural pronoun in Afrikaans is hulle, used to mean "they" or "them", in contrast to Dutch in which ze and zij are used as plural pronouns, hence "they are the best" is hulle is die beste as opposed to ze zijn de beste, although hullie is encountered in Dutch dialects, particularly in North Brabant and North and South Holland.

Other possessive pronouns like ons ("our", inflected as onze in Dutch and onse in Afrikaans) and Dutch jullie ("your" plural, julle in Afrikaans) work in a similar fashion in both languages.

=== Demonstrative pronouns ===
The word die is used in Afrikaans as a definite article, but in Dutch, it is used as a demonstrative pronoun meaning "that" or "those", or as a relative pronoun meaning "who", "which" or "that", for which Afrikaans would use wat; compare Afrikaans die man wat weet ("the man who knows") with Dutch de man die weet.

For demonstratives, Afrikaans uses hierdie for "this" or "these" and daardie for "that" or "those", which are shortened to dié (with an acute accent) and daai. In Dutch, dit is used as the word for "this", whereas in Afrikaans it is the third-person singular impersonal pronoun meaning "it", with dis being a contraction of dit is, similar to "it's" in English.

=== Genitive ===
As Afrikaans has no genitive forms of nouns, the official titles of most countries include the word van, although this was considered optional, hence Republiek van Malta (as opposed to Republiek Malta as in Dutch) although Republiek van Suid-Afrika was previously considered an anglicism. However, the Union of South Africa was known in Dutch and Afrikaans as Unie van Zuid-Afrika and Unie van Suid-Afrika respectively.

The title "Kingdom of the Netherlands", which refers to the entire realm including its Caribbean islands, is known in Afrikaans as Koninkryk van die Nederlande, a direct translation of the Dutch title Koninkrijk der Nederlanden, which uses the genitive article der meaning "of the".

Afrikaans may form compounds where Dutch would use separate words using the genitive or equivalent, or vice versa. For example, The Salvation Army is known in Afrikaans as Heilsleër, but in Dutch as Leger des Heils; conversely "Member of Parliament" in Afrikaans is Lid van Parlement, similar to English, while in Dutch, the term is parlementslid or kamerlid. However, in both languages, a member of a council or councillor is raadslid.

=== Possessive ===
Whereas Dutch uses an apostrophe with an "s" as in English to form the genitive, or alternatively an "s" without an apostrophe, Afrikaans uses se, hence Maria's huis and haar broers probleem would be Maria se huis and haar broer se probleem respectively.

Afrikaans, like Dutch, has possessive pronouns to indicate ownership, hence joune and jouwe, although Afrikaans omits the use of the definite article, hence is dit jou glas of syne? ("is that your glass or his?") in contrast to is dat jouw glas of het zijne? in Dutch.

Similarly, van or "of" is also omitted in Afrikaans; compare dit is my fiets, waar is joune? ("that is my bike, where is yours?") to Dutch dat is mijn fiets, waar is die van jou? However, Dutch also uses the construction waar is de jouwe?

=== Plural ===
While Afrikaans uses -e as the plural of most nouns, similar to Dutch -en, it also uses the -s ending where Dutch would use -en, hence the plural of seun ("son") being seuns, in contrast to Dutch, in which the plural of zoon is zonen, zoons being used as a plural in eighteenth century Dutch. The plural zoons in Dutch is still common.

Similarly, -ers is used as a double plural instead of -eren, hence the plural of kind ("child") is kinders, not kinderen, although the plural kinders being used in nineteenth century forms of Dutch, including West Flemish.

=== Double negative ===
A notable feature of Afrikaans is its use of a double negative, which is absent in standard Dutch, but still exists in some dialects like West Flemish, hence ik een niets nie gezien ("I have nothing not seen"). For example, ik spreek geen Engels ("I speak no English") in Dutch becomes ek praat nie Engels nie in Afrikaans. Similar constructions can be found in French (Je ne parle pas anglais) but also in old Dutch dialects, hence ik en kan niet gaan ("I not can not go") or daer is niemand niet ("there is nobody not").

=== Adjective inflections ===
Like Dutch, adjectives in Afrikaans are generally inflected (with a number of exceptions) in the attributive position (when preceding the noun) and not in the predicative. Unlike Dutch, this inflection depends only on position, not grammatical gender; for example, nasionaal, when followed by party becomes nasionale, hence Nasionale Party.

This also applies to adjectives from which the final "t" has been dropped, for example, while "first" is eers, not eerst, "first time" is eerste keer in both languages; similarly, while "bad" is sleg in Afrikaans (instead of Dutch slecht), the "t" is reintroduced in inflected form, hence slegte tye ("bad times") similar to slechte tijden.

Similarly, just as Dutch adjectives ending with -ief, such as positief, are inflected to end with -ieve, for example, positieve reactie ("positive reaction") their equivalents in Afrikaans end in -iewe, hence positiewe reaksie, despite the differences in spelling.

== Vocabulary differences ==
Owing to the geographical and later political isolation of South Africa from the Netherlands, Afrikaans vocabulary diverged from that of Dutch, coining purisms or using loan translations rather than adopting terms found in English, as English was perceived as being a greater threat to Afrikaans in South Africa than it was to Dutch in the Netherlands.

=== French and Latin influence ===
While Dutch, like English, increasingly borrowed vocabulary from Latin or French, Afrikaans resisted such borrowing and instead favoured older Germanic equivalents, albeit with some exceptions; one of these is the Afrikaans word for "hospital", hospitaal, which, while understood in Dutch, is less widely used than ziekenhuis (literally "sick house").

For example, the word for "magistrate" in Afrikaans, landdros, comes from the Dutch term landdrost, a legacy of the old court system of the Dutch Cape Colony which survived its abolition and replacement by magistrate's courts under British rule, but the term is no longer officially used in the Netherlands, where the Latin-derived term magistraat is used instead.

Conversely, the Dutch word procureur, referring to a kind of lawyer, became obsolete in 2008, whereas in Afrikaans, prokureur is still used to mean "attorney", "solicitor" or "lawyer", especially in the sense of Prokureur-Generaal or "Attorney-General". The spelling prokureur was also previously used in Dutch. By contrast, whereas advocaat in Dutch means "lawyer", in Afrikaans, advokaat is only used to mean "advocate" or "barrister", hence "Senior Counsel" in Afrikaans being Senior Advokaat.

Similarly, the South African Navy is known in Afrikaans as the Suid-Afrikaanse Vloot, the word vloot (meaning "fleet") having been used in Dutch for the navy of the Dutch Republic, known as Staatse vloot, but the modern Dutch navy is known as the Koninklijke Marine, marine being a French loanword.

In Afrikaans, Eerste-Minister ("first minister") was the official title of the Prime Minister of South Africa (before the post was abolished in 1984) and is still the official Dutch title of the Prime Minister of Belgium, but in the Netherlands, the term premier is used as a generic term for a prime minister or equivalent office holder, the official title of the Prime Minister of the Netherlands being minister-president.

In South Africa, the term premier is now more typically used in Afrikaans to refer to the head of government in each of the nine provinces, whereas eerste-minister is used for foreign leaders, and is used by the Afrikaans-language media in Namibia to refer to the country's Prime Minister.

Some French loanwords are common to Afrikaans as well as Dutch, such as regisseur, used in both languages to mean director of a play or film, although the use of rolprent in Afrikaans instead of "film" is considered old-fashioned in Dutch. The word redakteur ("editor") is used in Afrikaans as well as Dutch, but in the latter it is now written as redacteur.

=== Purisms and loan translations ===
As the influence of English was perceived as a threat to Afrikaans, there was a trend to coin purisms rather than to borrow from English or international vocabulary; whereas the word for "computer" in Dutch is simply computer, in Afrikaans it is rekenaar, from reken, meaning "to calculate".

Other purisms were less successful; beeldradio, a word for "television" which literally means "picture radio", proposed before its introduction in the 1970s, was abandoned in favour of televisie, already used in Dutch. In South Africa and Namibia, the TV licence is known in Afrikaans as TV-lisensie, whereas in the Netherlands and Flanders, the now defunct equivalent was known in Dutch as kijkgeld ("viewing money") or omroepbijdrage ("broadcasting subsidy").

There are some instances of Afrikaans using calques or loan translations where Dutch uses an English loanword, such as the word for "milkshake", melkskommel, from melk ("milk") and skommel ("shake" or "shuffle") in contrast to Dutch, in which the original English word is untranslated.

Similarly, English has influenced such terms in Afrikaans as bestuurslisensie, from bestuur ("driving") and lisensie ("licence") and grondboontjiebotter, literally "peanut butter". By contrast, the Dutch term rijbewijs, translates as "driving certificate", but while ry is used in Afrikaans to mean "driving", bewys means "evidence" or "proof".

The Dutch term for peanut butter, pindakaas (literally "peanut cheese"), was coined because when it was first sold in the Netherlands, the term boter was a protected name and could only be used for products containing actual butter. The word pinda, a loanword from Papiamentu, spoken in the Dutch Caribbean, is ultimately of Kongo origin.

=== Comparison of vocabulary ===
Afrikaans	Dutch	English
aand	avond	evening
aartappelskyfies	(aardappel)chips	potato chips (US) crisps (UK)
afkappingsteken, apostroof	weglatingsteken, afkappingsteken, apostrof	apostrophe
afleweringswa, bestelwa, paneelwa	bestelbus (Netherlands) bestelwagen (Belgium)	delivery van, panel van
amper	bijna amper means "just"	nearly, almost
amptelik	officieel ambtelijk means "ex officio"	official
as	als	if
asem	adem asem also used in Belgium	breath
asseblief	alsjeblieft, alstublieft	please
baadjie, jas	jasje, vest	jacket
baba	baby, kindje	baby
babalaas, babelas	kater	hangover
baie	heel, zeer, veel	very, much
bakkie	pick-up	pick-up truck
beeldpoetser	media-adviseur	media spokesperson press officer
bergie, boemelaar	zwerver	vagrant
bestuurslisensie	rijbewijs	driving licence (UK) driver's license (US)
blokkiesraaisel	kruiswoordraadsel	crossword puzzle
bobbejaan	baviaan	baboon
bokkie	schatje, liefje	baby, darling
bolla	zoet broodje	bun
botsing	botsing, aanrijding	collision
braai	barbecue	barbecue
Brittanje	Groot-Brittannië	Britain, Great Britain
bromponie	bromfiets, scooter	moped, scooter
daardie, daai	die	that, those
dagga	marihuana	marijuana, cannabis
dankie	dank je/u, bedankt	thank you, thanks
deur	door	through, door
deurmekaar	door elkaar door mekaar dialectal	mixed up, confused
die	de, het	the
domkrag	krik	jack (device for lifting heavy objects)
duikboot	onderzeeër, duikboot	submarine
duikweg	tunnel	tunnel, underpass
dwelms	drugs bedwelmen means "intoxicate"	drugs
e-pos	e-mail e-post purism	email
eiendoms beperk (Edms.) Bpk.	besloten vennootschap (BV)	propriety limited (Pty.) Ltd.
eksie-perfeksie	fantastisch	cool, great
ekskuus	excuus similar pronunciation	sorry, apology
enigiets	nog iets	anything
enigiemand	iedereen	anyone
enjin	motor	engine
gatvol	zat zijn	fed up
geskenk	geschenk, cadeau	gift, present
glo	geloven	believe
gogga	insect	insect, bug
grasperk	gazon	lawn
grondboontjie	pinda aardnoot, apennoot, grondnoot and olienoot are also sometimes used	peanut
grondboontjiebotter	pindakaas	peanut butter
gunsteling	favoriet gunsteling older term	favourite
haas	konijn haas means "hare"	rabbit
Heilsleër	Leger des Heils; Heilsleger older term	Salvation Army
hierdie, dié	dit, deze	this, these
hoender	kip hoen, hoender are less common	chicken
hoekom?	hoezo? waarom?	how come? how so? why?
hoezit! (hoe is dit?)	hoe gaat het? hoe is het?	how's it going?
hoërskool	voortgezet onderwijs, middelbare school (Netherlands) secundair onderwijs (Belgium)	high school, secondary school
Hollands (taal)	Nederlands (taal)	Dutch (language)
horlosie	horloge	watch
hospitaal	ziekenhuis, gasthuis hospitaal mostly used in a military context	hospital
hysbak, hyser	lift	lift, elevator
inskrywing	abonnement, inschrijving	subscription
jol	leukheid	fun, party
Julie	juli	July
Junie	juni	June
kaartjie	kaartje, ticket	ticket
kameelperd	giraffe kameelpaard and kameelpardel considered archaic	giraffe
kampanje	campagne similar pronunciation	campaign
Kanada	Canada	Canada
Kersfees	Kerstmis (Catholic); Kerstfeest (Protestant)	Christmas
kitsbank	geldautomaat, bankautomaat	cash machine, ATM
klavier	piano	piano
koerant	krant courant older term	newspaper
kombuis	keuken kombuis means "galley" (on a ship)	kitchen
konserwatief	conservatief	conservative
kopiereg	copyright, auteursrecht	copyright
landdros	magistraat	magistrate
lê	leggen, liggen	lie, lay
leër	landmacht, leger	army
lemmetjie	limoen lemmetje (Suriname)	lime
lemoen	sinaasappel (Netherlands) appelsien (Belgium)	orange
Lid van Parlement (LP)	parlementslid, kamerlid	Member of Parliament (MP)
lirieke	songtekst	lyrics
lokprent	trailer	film trailer
lugmag	luchtmacht	air force
lughawe	luchthaven, vliegveld	airport
lugpos	luchtpost	airmail
lugredery	luchtvaartmaatschappij	airline
lugwaardin	stewardess luchtwaardin older Belgian purism	air hostess air stewardess
maalvleis	gehakt	mincemeat
mal oor	gek op	mad about
masjienkap	motorkap	bonnet (UK) hood (US)
meisie	meisje, meid	girl
mekaar	elkaar mekaar dialectal	each other
melkskommel	milkshake	milkshake
moffie (Usage Warning: moffie is considered a homophobic slur, comparable to "faggot")	homo	gay, effeminate man
moltrein	metro	metro, subway train
moontlik	mogelijk	possible
muurpapier	behang	wallpaper
na	naar	to
ná	na	after
naby	dichtbij, nabij	close to
naweek	weekend weekeinde sometimes used	weekend
nie	niet	not
niggie	nichtje	niece
Nieu-Seeland	Nieuw-Zeeland	New Zealand
nuus	nieuws	news
nuusblad, nuustydskrif	opinieblad, nieuwsblad	news magazine, news letter
onderskrifte	ondertitels	subtitles
oomblik	moment, ogenblik	moment
oopmaak, maak oop	openen, openmaken	to open
oorklanking	nasynchronisatie	dubbing
oorspronklik	origineel oorspronkelijk used only in relation to the origin or beginning	original
oos	oost	east
openbare maatskappy	naamloze vennootschap (NV)	public limited company (PLC)
ou, outjie	kerel, gozer	guy, bloke
outomaties	automatisch	automatic
padda	kikker pad means "toad"	frog
passasier	passagier	passenger
perd	paard	horse
peuselhappie	snack, tussendoortje	snacks
piesang	banaan pisang less common term	banana
pikkewyn	pinguïn, vetgans	penguin
polisiebeampte	politieagent politiebeambte used formally	police officer
polisiestasie, polisiekantoor	politiebureau politiekantoor rare term	police station
posbus	postbus	post office box
poskantoor	postkantoor	post office
posman, posbode	postbode	postman
prokureur	advocaat	attorney, solicitor, lawyer
pynappel	ananas pijnappel older term, now means "pine cone"	pineapple
ratel	honingdas ratel considered archaic	honey badger
reisagent, reisagentskap	reisbureau (Netherlands) reisagentschap (Belgium)	travel agent, travel agency
rekenaar	computer rekentuig purism, considered dated	computer
renoster	neushoorn renoster considered archaic	rhinoceros
rolprent	film rolprent considered dated	film
rubriekskrywer	columnist	newspaper columnist
sakrekenaar	rekenmachine, zakrekenmachine, calculator	calculator
sambreel	paraplu sombreel means "parasol"	umbrella
sampioen	champignon	mushroom
saans	's avonds'	in the evening
sê	zeggen	say
seekoei	nijlpaard zeekoe older term, now means "sea cow"	hippopotamus
selfoon	mobiele telefoon, mobieltje (Netherlands); GSM (Belgium) cellulair, cell (Suriname)	mobile phone (UK, Australia) cellphone (US, South Africa)
sent	cent	cent
seuntjie	jongen zoontje means "(small) son"	boy, young man
sinies	cynisch	cynical
sinkplaat	golfplaat	corrugated iron
sjokolade	chocolade	chocolate
skadu, skaduwee	schaduw, schaduwbeeld	shadow
skakel	bellen schakelen means "to change gear"	dial, call (telephone number)
skeelhoofpyn	migraine	migraine
skootrekenaar	laptop schootcomputer sometimes used	laptop
skurf	ruw schurft means "scabies"	rough
slagoffer	slachtoffer	victim
slaptjips	frieten	french fries (US), chips (UK)
snippermandjie	prullenmand	wastepaper basket
soet	zoet	sweet
sokker	voetbal	association football (UK) soccer (US)
soos	als, zoals	like, such as
spinnekop	spin spinnenkop sometimes used	spider
spoed	snelheid	speed
staatsdiens	civiele dienst (Netherlands) overheidsdienst (Belgium)	civil service, public service
stasie	station statie older term	station
Statebond	Gemenebest van Naties statenbond sometimes used for "confederation"	Commonwealth of Nations
stasiewa	stationwagen	station wagon (US) estate (UK)
stewels	laarzen	boots
streek	streek, gewest, regio	region
stuurwiel	stuur	steering wheel
suid	zuid	south
suiwer	zuiver	clean
suurlemoen	citroen	lemon
sypaadjie	stoep, trottoir, voetpad	pavement (UK), sidewalk (US)
tjek	cheque	cheque, check
toeter	toeter, claxon	hooter (UK), horn (US)
troeteldier	huisdier	pet (animal)
tuisblad	homepagina, thuispagina	homepage
uitgawe	editie, uitgave uitgaven can also mean "expenditure"	edition, version
uitsaai	omroep, uitzending uitzaaiing means "metastasis"	broadcasting
uurglas	zandloper	hourglass
van	achternaam, van	surname
vanaand	vanavond	this evening
vanmôre	vanmorgen	this morning
vat	pakken	seize, clutch
verkleurmannetjie (also trapsoetjies, trapsuutjies)	kameleon verkleurmannetje considered archaic	chameleon
vinnig	snel vinnig in Dutch can mean insulting, offending or cutting speech	fast, quick
vir	voor	for
vlak, peil	niveau, peil	level (height of a substance, like water)
vlugbeampte, vlugkelner	steward	air steward, flight attendant
voetsek! (voert sê ek!)	verdwijn! scheer je weg!	get lost! away with you!
vrieskas	vrieskist, diepvries, diepvriezer, vrieskast	freezer
vulstasie	tankstation	filling station, petrol station, service station
vuurhoutjie	lucifer vuurhoutje considered dated	match, light
wa	wagen	wagon
wasbak	wasbak, wastafel	washbasin, sink
wat	welke, wie	which, who
webwerf	website webstek purism	website
weermag	krijgsmacht weermacht sometimes used	defence force, armed forces
wêreldwyd	wereldwijd	worldwide
wees	zijn wezen sometimes used informally	to be
wes	west	west
woonstel	appartement, flat	apartment, flat
yskas	ijskast, koelkast	refrigerator
Ysland	IJsland	Iceland
yster	ijzer	iron

=== Names of languages and countries ===
Unlike in Dutch, in Afrikaans, the word Afrikaans is not used to mean "African" in general; instead the prefix Afrika- is used, hence whereas African languages would be referred to in Dutch as Afrikaanse talen, in Afrikaans, they would be called Afrikatale. Conversely, the Afrikaans language is sometimes referred to in Dutch as Zuid-Afrikaans, literally "South African".

Although the Netherlands is formally called Nederland in Afrikaans, it is more colloquially known as Holland, as in English. The term Hollanders is similarly also used to refer to Dutch people in general, particularly in a historical context, while Hollands is used either to refer to the Dutch language or as an adjective, hence the expression die Kaap is weer Hollands ("the Cape is Dutch again") to mean that things are back to normal.

In the Netherlands, the former Dutch Reformed Church was known in Dutch as the Nederlandse Hervormde Kerk, but in South Africa, the two Dutch Reformed Churches are known in Afrikaans as the Nederduitse Gereformeerde Kerk and Nederduitsch Hervormde Kerk respectively, as Nederduitsch (or Nederduits) originally referred not to Low German but to any West Germanic language except High German.

=== Changes in meanings of words ===
Although the Afrikaans word as, like als in Dutch, means "if", it is also used as a conjunction to mean "than" with which to make comparisons, instead of dan, used in Dutch, hence "more than" is meer as (similar to mehr als in German) rather than meer dan, although meer als is also encountered in Dutch.

In Dutch, als can also mean "as" or "like", but Afrikaans generally uses soos, similar to zoals ("such as") in Dutch, whereas Dutch would use either als or zoals, hence the Afrikaans troeteldiere soos katte en honde... ("pets, like cats and dogs,...") could be translated into Dutch either as huisdieren als katten en honden or dieren zoals katten en honden....

While the Afrikaans verb heet can be used to mean "to be called", like the Dutch heten, it is less commonly used for that purpose, hence "what is your name?" and "my name is John" would be wat is jou naam? and my naam is Johan, rather than hoe heet jy? ("how are you called?") and ek heet Johan. By contrast, Dutch would use hoe heet je? and ik heet John.

In Afrikaans, heet is used to mean "to be said", for example, soos dit heet ("as it is claimed") or, as in Dutch, "to bid", as in ek heet jou welkom ("I bid you welcome" or "I welcome you"). As an adjective, like the Dutch heet, it means "hot", as in "high temperature", and can also mean "fiery temper". In Dutch, heet can also mean "hot" in the sense of "spicy" or "horny".

Like praten in Dutch, the verb praat in Afrikaans means "to talk", but can also mean "to speak", where Dutch uses spreken; compare sy praat vlot Engels ("she speaks English fluently") with zij spreekt vlot Engels. However, Afrikaans uses sprekend as an adjective meaning "speaking", as in Afrikaansprekend ("Afrikaans-speaking"). Spreek is used interchangeably with praat, but praat is more common.

Like "football" in American and Australian English, the term voetbal is not generally used in Afrikaans to mean soccer, which, unlike in Dutch, is called sokker. Instead, it is used in the context of other codes of football, such as American football, hence Amerikaanse voetbal. In Dutch, soccer is only used to refer to the game when played in the United States. Rugby, however, is the more popular sport amongst Afrikaners.

=== Changes due to spelling and pronunciation ===
The changes in spelling and pronunciation in Afrikaans means that two unrelated words become homophones and are written identically, unlike their Dutch equivalents; bly in Afrikaans, like blij in Dutch is used as an adjective to mean "happy", it is also a verb meaning "to remain", cognate with blijven in Dutch.

In Afrikaans, unlike Dutch, the word ná (meaning "after") is written with an acute accent, as na (derived from Dutch naar) means "to". Conversely, while the Dutch word for "one" is written as één, to distinguish it from the indefinite article een, in Afrikaans, een ("one") is written without any diacritics as the indefinite article in that language is ŉ.

Similarly, the Dutch word for "before", vóór, may be written with acute accents on both vowels to distinguish it from voor, meaning "for", although it is correct to write the word without them irrespective of meaning. By contrast, voor in Afrikaans only means "before", the word for "for" being vir, and so no diacritics are required.

In both languages, oor means "ear", but in Afrikaans oor (derived from Dutch over) can also mean "over" or "about", as in hy praat oor die weer ("he talks about the weather", or in Dutch hij spreekt over het weer). Although Dutch and Afrikaans share a number of words prefixed with ⟨oor⟩, such as oorsprong ("origin"), this is an unrelated word meaning "original".

Although kus in Afrikaans can mean "kiss", as in Dutch, the more usual term is soen, similar to Dutch zoen, as the homophone kus means "coast". In contrast to the Dutch equivalents kus and kust (plural kussen and kusten), it is only in their inflected plural forms kusse and kuste that the two Afrikaans words can be clearly distinguished.

=== False friends due to English influence ===
English language influence has also resulted in changes in the meanings of some Afrikaans words, such as eventueel, which now means "eventual" or "eventually", rather than "possibly", as in Dutch. Consequently, some Afrikaans dictionaries give both meanings, with the entry for eventueel listing uitendelik ("finally") as well as moontlik ("possible") as definitions. However, the latter is described as Nederlandisties or "Dutch-influenced".

By contrast, other Afrikaans words cognate with Dutch ones retain the same meaning, such as aktueel, which, like actueel in Dutch, means "up to date" or "concerned with current affairs", although aktualiteit can also mean "reality" in the sense of the English word "actuality". The Dutch word actualiteit, on the other hand, only means "topicality" or "current events". Dutch also previously spelled both actueel and actualiteit with a "k".

=== Colloquialisms ===
Another consequence of the two languages diverging has been the differences between colloquialisms, meaning that a word in Dutch which has no offensive connotations is used as an expletive or term of abuse in Afrikaans, and vice versa, although other changes in meanings have also arisen.

For example, the Afrikaans phrase die meisie gooi haar flikkers ("the girl throws her sparkle") was highlighted by the Dutch journalist, Derk-Jan Eppink, in an article in the daily NRC Handelsblad, as an example of differences in meaning. In Afrikaans, flikkers by iemand gooi means to flirt with someone, but in Dutch, flikker means a male homosexual, while flikker op! is akin to the British English expletive "bugger off!"

=== List of words with different meanings ===
Word	Afrikaans meaning	Dutch meaning
aardig	pleasant, strange	friendly
amper	nearly	scarcely
bees(t)	generic singular for cattle (cow, bull, etc.)	animal
bliksem	lightning, also expletive meaning "bastard" (as noun) and "bloody" (as adjective). It can also mean to hit or an intention to hit someone to cause great bodily harm as in "Ek gaan jou bliksem" – "I am going to kill / hit you."	lightning
brommer	blue bottle fly (insect)	motor cycle or scooter
dassie	rock hyrax (Procavia capensis)	European badger (Meles meles) (diminutive)
die	the	that one, which, who
dit	it	this, these
doos	box, also expletive "cunt"	box, case, also "daft woman"
fok(ken)	fuck, fucking	to breed, to rear (animal husbandry)
geitj(i)e	gecko (reptile)	small goat
het	have, has	the (neuter gender)
Holland	Netherlands	former province of Holland
houtkop	racial slur for black African, literally "wooden head"	"wooden head"
kaal	naked	bald
koeke(n)pan	mine cart or skip (rolling stock used in mining)	cake pan
kont	female genitals, also expletive "cunt"	buttocks
kuier(en)	visit	go for a walk
l(e/i)moen	orange (fruit)	lime
lol	cause trouble	have fun
motor	motorcar	motorcycle
na	to	after
Nederduits	Dutch (as in Dutch Reformed Church)	Low German Dutch formerly used the term to refer to the Dutch language
neuk(en)	strike, hit	screw, hump, have sex with
piel	expletive "dick", "penis"	duckling
poes	expletive "cunt" or "pussy"	pussycat, tabby (although poesje is used as a vulgar term for "vagina")
sop	soup	dishwater
stoep	veranda	sidewalk
vat	take	grab, seize
verskoon	excuse	clean
vies	angry, annoyed	dirty, filthy
vinnig	fast	sharp
waaier	electric fan	hand fan

== Comparisons of various phrases in Afrikaans and Dutch ==
Afrikaans	Dutch	English
Verstaan jy my?	Versta jij mij? / Begrijp je me?	Do you understand me?
Ek verstaan dit	Ik versta dit / Ik begrijp het	I understand it
Wat is jou naam?	Hoe heet je? Wat is jouw naam?	What is your name?
Wat maak jy?	Wat ben je aan het doen? Compare Dutch Wat maak jij? (What are you making?)	What are you doing?
Dit maak my seer	Het doet me pijn / Dit doet mij zeer	It hurts me
Ek hou van haar	Ik vind haar leuk / Ik hou van haar	I like her
Ek is lief vir jou	Ik hou van jou Compare Dutch Ik ben lief voor jou (I am sweet to you)	I love you
Ek het jou lief	Ik heb jou lief / Ik hou van jou	I love you
Is jy honger?	Heb je honger? / Heb jij honger?	Are you hungry?
Dié boek is vir jou	Dit boek is voor jou	This book is for you
Ek het al geëet	Ik heb al gegeten	I have already eaten
Kom jy saam met ons?	Kom je met ons mee? / Kom je samen met ons mee?	Are you coming with us?
Stem jy saam?	Ben je het daarmee eens? Stem jij daarmee in?	Do you agree?
Stem jy [daartoe] in?	Stem jij daarmee in? / Ga je daarmee akkoord?	Do you agree [to it]?
Oop vanaand	Open vanavond	Open tonight
Hulle woon hier	Ze wonen hier Dialectal: Hullie wonen hier	They live here
Kan ons die middestad besoek?	Kunnen we de binnenstad bezoeken? Belgium Dutch: Kunnen we de middenstad bezoeken?	Can we visit the city centre?
Ek is halfpad daar	Ik ben halverwege	I am halfway there
Hierdie vrug proe/smaak sleg	Dit fruit is niet lekker / Dit fruit smaakt slecht	This fruit tastes bad
Het jy dat gesê?	Heb je dat gezegd? Zei je dat?	Did you say that?
Hy het op die lughawe aangekom	Hij is op de luchthaven aangekomen	He has arrived at the airport
Moenie dit vergeet nie!	Vergeet het niet!	Don't forget it!
As dit reën, sal dié sambreel jou beskerm	Als het regent, zal deze paraplu jou beschermen *	If it rains, this umbrella will protect you
'n Lemoen is 'n oranjekleurige vrug	Een sinaasappel is een oranjekleurige vrucht	An orange is an orange-coloured fruit
'n Lemmetjie is 'n klein groen sitrusvrug	Een limoen is een kleine groene citrusvrucht	A lime is a small green citrus fruit
Ons hou daarvan om te braai	Wij houden ervan om te barbecueën Compare Dutch: braden (to roast), Wij houden ervan om te braaien (braaien is a recent loanword from Afrikaans) **	We love to barbecue
Ek kan dit nie glo nie	Ik kan dit niet geloven	I cannot believe it

* In some Dutch dialects it is also common to pronounce als as as.
** In Dutch, in some dialects d between two vowels tends to degenerate to i (pronounced -[jən]) or w (e.g. goedendag > goeiedag (good day), bloeden > bloeien (bleed), rode > rooie (red), poeder > poeier (powder), loden > looien (lead), lang geleden > lang gelejen (long ago), wij deden > wij dejen (we did), onthouden > onthouwen (remember)), some of which forms are more common and more accepted than others (dialectical, spoken, informal or standard language).

== Comparison of sample text ==
Below is a comparison of the Afrikaans words of the first stanza of "Die Stem van Suid-Afrika" (formerly the national anthem of South Africa) with the Dutch translation.

Afrikaans	Dutch	English translation (literal)
Uit die blou van onse hemel,	Uit het blauw van onze hemel	From the blue of our sky
Uit die diepte van ons see,	Uit de diepte van onze zee,	From the depths of our sea,
Oor ons ewige gebergtes	Over onze eeuwige gebergtes,	Over our eternal mountains
Waar die kranse antwoord gee.	Waar de rotsen antwoord geven.	Where the cliffs give answer
Deur ons ver verlate vlaktes	Door onze ver verlaten vlaktes	Through our far-deserted plains
Met die kreun van ossewa.	Met het gekreun van ossenwagens	With the groan of ox-wagon
Ruis die stem van ons geliefde,	Ruist de stem van ons geliefde,	Rouses the voice of our beloved,
Van ons land Suid-Afrika.	Van ons land Zuid-Afrika.	Of our country South Africa
Ons sal antwoord op jou roepstem,	We zullen antwoorden op je roepen	We will answer to your calling,
Ons sal offer wat jy vra:	We zullen offeren wat jij vraagt	We will sacrifice what you ask
Ons sal lewe, ons sal sterwe,	We zullen leven, we zullen sterven	We will live, we will die
Ons vir jou, Suid-Afrika.	Wij voor jou, Zuid-Afrika.	We for Thee, South Africa.

== See also ==
- Comparison of Danish, Norwegian and Swedish
- Comparison of Indonesian and Standard Malay
- Comparison of Portuguese and Spanish
- Comparison of Ukrainian and other Slavic languages
