= Kaaps =

Dialect of Afrikaans

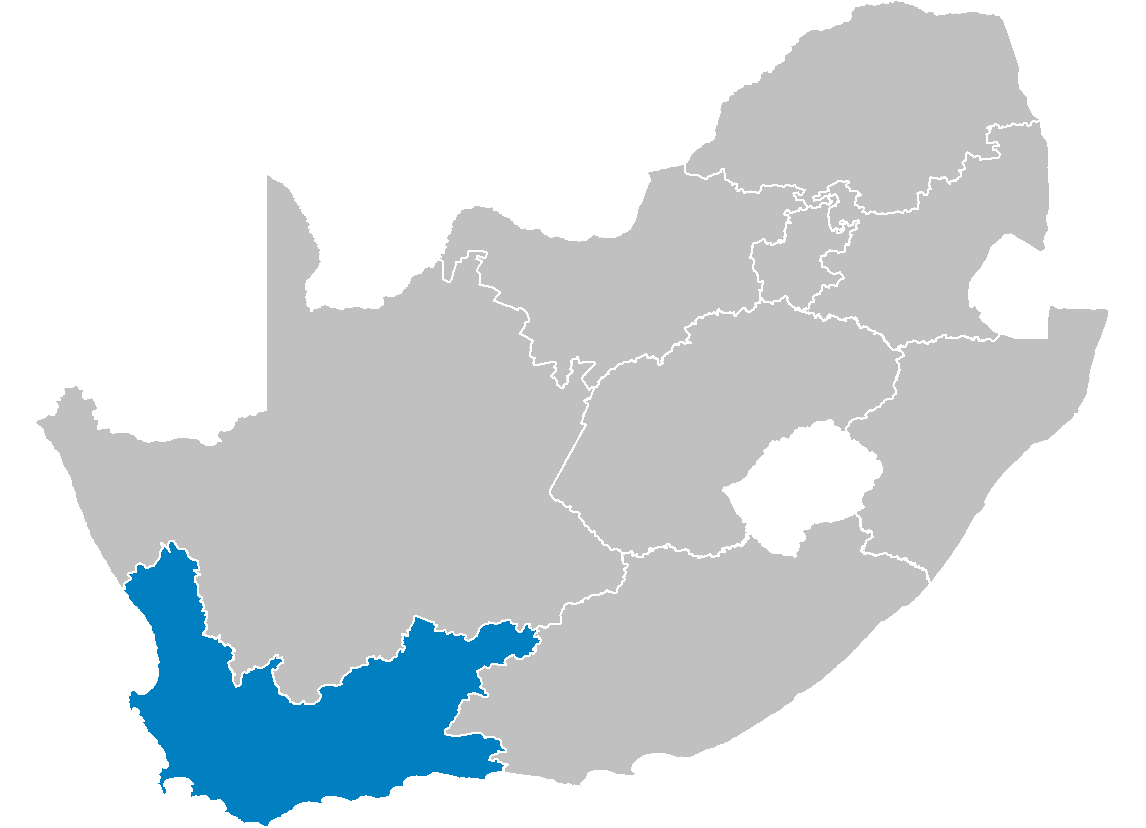
- Western Cape within South Africa
- Pronunciation: [kɑːps]
- Native to: South Africa (Western Cape)
- Ethnicity: Cape Coloureds; Cape Malays
- Native speakers
- Language family: Indo-European: Germanic; West Germanic; Weser–Rhine Germanic; Low Franconian; Dutch; Central Dutch; Hollandic; Afrikaans; Kaaps
- Early forms: Frankish: Old Dutch; Middle Dutch; 17th-century Hollandic

Language codes
- ISO 639-3: –

Kaaps (UK: /kɑːps/, meaning 'of the Cape'), also known as Afrikaaps, is a dialect of Afrikaans that evolved in the Western Cape province of South Africa. Since the early 2020s there has been a significant increase in the number of works of literature published in Kaaps. Most works in Kaaps come from authors located in the Cape Flats area of Cape Town, South Africa, where it is most commonly spoken. Although Kaaps is considered a growing phenomenon, it is more specifically a colloquial dialect of Afrikaans. All other distinct colloquial variations of Afrikaans, including Kaaps, are organically connected to Standard Afrikaans as a widely spoken unitary variety and interact with it.

An academic project to create the first Kaaps language dictionary was launched in 2021.

== History ==
In the 17th century, Kaaps developed in South Africa's Western Cape in a multilingual context through the Dutch Colonisation. In 1652 the Dutch East India Company (Vereenigde Oostindische Compagnie, VOC) set up a refreshment station on the Cape, with the main purpose to replenish the supplies of food for the ships sailing between Europe and the East. During this period, the region's population consisted of a range of people from different ethnic groups and cultures such as the indigenous Khoisan, Malays, West Africans and Madagascan people. Many of these people were enslaved by the VOC, the Dutch East India Company and opulent Netherlanders. As a form of rebellion, the people refused to speak the language of the colonists, Kaaps thus developed through Afrikaans to communicate with one another and keep their conversations private.

== Identity and social status ==
Just as with any language, Kaaps plays an indisputable role in an individual's culture and identity, especially on the Cape Flats. Kaaps and its speakers, consisting mostly of "coloured" individuals, are deemed as marginalised. Under apartheid, "coloureds" were considered the “forgotten nation”, but latterly more positive identity construction centres on concepts of creolisation and "Khoisan" indigeneity. In hegemonic discourse, only one of two perspectives is taken into account when discussing political topics such as class, race, and culture within a South African context: either that of the "over-privileged White" or that of the "underprivileged Black." Despite "coloured" and "black" individuals sharing similar oppression, inequality and poverty of the South African apartheid, the "coloured" community remains an overlooked social group.

=== Stigmatisation ===
Kaaps is mostly spoken by the working class "coloured" community on the Cape Flats. Kaaps is considered one of the most stigmatised variations of Afrikaans; it is often associated with low status and being comical. It was also a marker of one's origins, used by the apartheid Race Classification Board when considering borderline cases. Some common labels of Kaaps include a "kombuistaal" (kitchen language) and "skollie-idioom” (gangster idiom). The dominating image and portrayal of a Cape Kaaps speaker often consists of being uneducated, half-skilled, naive and unable to comprehend or fully appreciate complexities. Additionally, Kaaps is portrayed as a socially inferior “other”. It is mocked by numerous jokes and linked to Gatiepie, which is equivalent to the American Blackface in pop culture. Due to this negative connotation and stigmatisation, many speakers of Kaaps felt embarrassed while using it in public settings.

== Dictionary ==
The first dictionary in Kaaps has been announced in Cape Town, South Africa in 2021. This dictionary will be trilingual and will contain Kaaps, Afrikaans and English. The "Trilingual Dictionary of Kaaps" project was launched through a collective effort by academic and community stakeholders; the Centre for Multilingualism and Diversities research at the University of the Western Cape in partnership with an NGO Heal the Hood Project. The "Trilingual Dictionary of Kaaps" has four goals: to increase awareness and knowledge on the history and roots of Kaaps, to contribute to debates around unifying the writing systems of Kaaps, to document the use of Kaaps on different platforms and lastly, to describe the lived linguistic experiences of Kaaps speakers.

Today Kaaps is a marginalized language as it was perceived as a colloquial version of standard Afrikaans during the Apartheid era in South Africa, a perception that persists in contemporary democratic South Africa. During the late 1800s and early 1900s, Afrikaans was adopted by Dutch speaking settlers of European descent thereby contributing to the formation of the Afrikaner ethnic group; with standard Afrikaans being established and developed as a form of resistance against English linguistic presence in the Cape Colony, which they perceived as hegemonic. The development of Afrikaans was used to create a collective racial identity of ordinary "white" Afrikaner people, thereby separating them from the working-class, Kaaps-speaking "coloured" community. Kaaps is viewed as a subpar, impure or mixed language; consisting of mainly Afrikaans and English languages thrown together. The speakers of Kaaps are often linked to a low social-order, comicality, stupidity and a despised language variety.

The dictionary project has been critiqued as constituting a form of "woordeboekapartheid" [dictionary apartheid], since it furthers colonial and apartheid "race" categories - specifically so-called Colouredness- on the one hand and questionable linguistic research practices on the other. This critique has illustrated how the methodology of the dictionary project is academically unsound.

It does not take into account insights from variational linguistics research in and on Afrikaans, and this leads to aspects of Afrikaans - which could be described as regional, dialectical, or merely colloquial - subsequently being appropriated through the dictionary project as being uniquely Kaaps, when there is no scholarly basis to do so. This critique of appropriation also applies to the dictionary project's "dating" of Kaaps to the 1500s, since the argument for "dating" Afrikaans's origins to 1595 relate not to Kaaps, but to another dialect of the language, namely Orange River Afrikaans.

== See also ==
- Afrikaans (Eastern Cape dialect)
- Afrikaans (Northern Cape dialect)
