= Patagonian Afrikaans =

Form of Afrikaans

- Patagoniese Afrikaans
- Native to: Argentina
- Region: Chubut Province; Sarmiento; Comodoro Rivadavia
- Ethnicity: Boer Argentines
- Native speakers: 20-30 (2019)
- Revival
- Language family: Indo-European: Germanic; West Germanic; Weser–Rhine Germanic; Low Franconian; Dutch; Central Dutch; Hollandic; Afrikaans; Patagonian Afrikaans
- Early forms: Frankish: Dutch; Afrikaans

Language codes
- ISO 639-3: –
- IETF: af-u-sd-aru

Patagonian Afrikaans is a form of Afrikaans brought to Argentina by Boer immigrants following the Second Boer War (1899–1902).

Today, there are still Afrikaans-speaking communities with a well established cultural identity.

== History ==
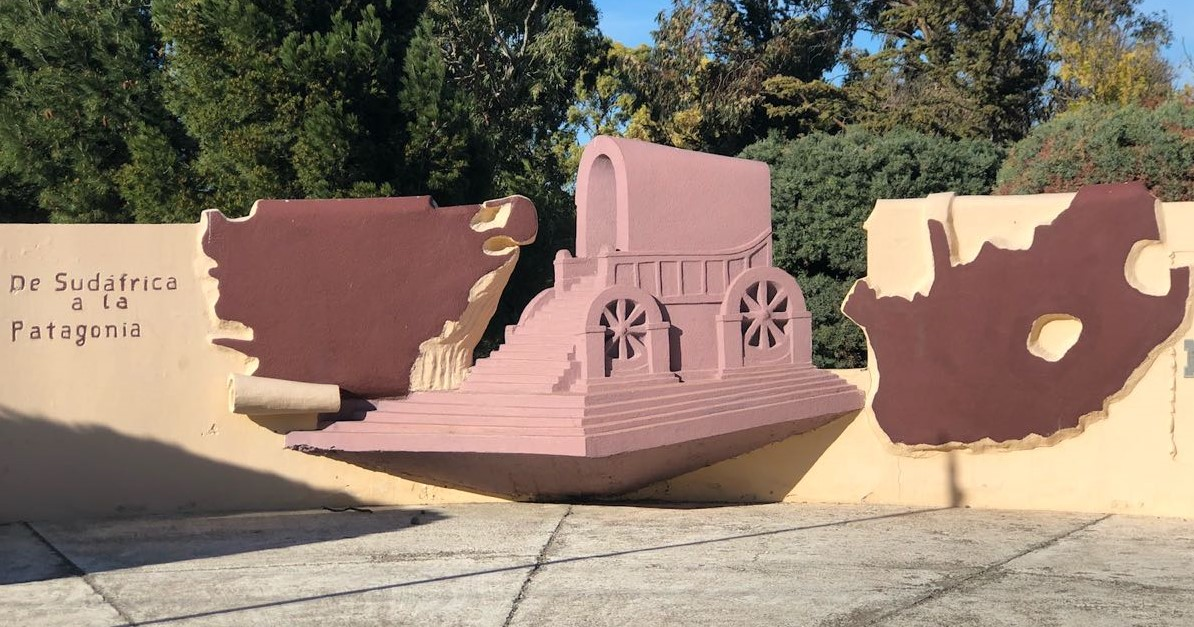
Monument commemorating the arrival of the Boers in Chubut.

Afrikaans was brought to Patagonia in 1902 by Boers following their defeat in the Second Boer War. Boer immigration ended by 1907 with approximately 600-650 Afrikaners settling in Comodoro Rivadavia. An Argentine delegation visited South Africa around the turn of the century and published advertisements in newspapers in Bloemfontein, Philipstown, and Burgersdorp to encourage Afrikaner immigration to Chubut. In 1938, about half of the community was repatriated to South Africa.

The Boers were amongst the first settlers of Comodoro Rivadavia, but many trekked further inland to Sarmiento, as it had better access to arable land and fresh water. Many of these colonists' descendants still speak Afrikaans and continue to attend the Dutch Reformed Church. An early arrival described the territory as "painfully discouraging: bare ridges, with huge limestone rocks scattered around, threatening to tumble down. Yes, the coast was so unattractive that one might think that this part of the creation was still incomplete, and the bare mountains were heaps of sand which were left over when the Creator - with respect - had completed His task."

The community in Sarmiento was isolated for over 120 years and remained monolingual Afrikaans until the mid-1950s.

== Speakers ==
There is no accurate estimate for the number of Afrikaans speakers in Argentina. The University of Michigan collaborated with the community and identified no more than 40 fluent speakers in 2018 while 20 to 30 were described in 2019. Very few people under the age of sixty still speak Afrikaans, but it has been retained by third-generation descendants; this shift is believed to have been encouraged by intermarriage, increased immigration by Spanish speakers during the 1950s for economic reasons, and the suggestion by South African journalists that Afrikaner-Argentines were less-than. There is also no accurate estimate for the number of Boer descendants, though most live in Comodoro, Sarmiento, and the surrounding areas. Community members claim somewhere between 500 and 1,200 descendants with around 35 Boer families numbering "several hundred" in Comodoro.

== Characteristics ==
Patagonian Afrikaans exhibits velar palatalization before non-back mid and high vowels /i ɛ ə iə ei/ so that kind [kənd] "child" is pronounced [kjənt]. It also lacks /ɛ/-lowering before /r l k x/. In standard Afrikaans the vowel /ɛ/ becomes [æ] before /r l k/ but in Patagonia it is always [ɛ], for example the first person pronoun ek "I" is pronounced as [ɛk] instead of [æk]. Velar palatalization and /ɛ/-lowering do not occur in standard Afrikaans, which is based on the Northeastern dialect, nor are they features of Spanish. However, they do occur in Northern-Cape Afrikaans, suggesting that Patagonian Afrikaans is more reminiscent of the Northern-Cape dialect.

Between vowels the letter "g" is pronounced as a voiced plosive [g] so that the word nege (Afrikaans pronunciation: [ˈniəχə]) "nine," is pronounced as [ˈniəgə]. This was an archaism that existed in Afrikaans prior to its standardization.

=== Spanish influence ===
In Afrikaans, nouns form their plural by adding [-s] or [-ə]. Influence from Spanish has caused speakers to replace [-ə] with [-s] in many words. Instead of trokke "trucks" there is troks, and instead of skoene "shoes" there is skoens.

Spanish has also possibly influenced the syntax, so that Patagonian Afrikaans lacks double negation. Instead of standard Ek gaan nie plaas toe nie "I don't go to the farm" which uses the negative particle nie twice, Patagonian Afrikaans would instead say Ek gaan nie plaas toe, which only uses nie once.

Spanish influence on Patagonian Afrikaans phonology has caused vowel production to become closer to that of Spanish. Afrikaans vowels /ɛ ɔ/ have closer vowel spacing to Spanish /e o/, while Afrikaans short and long /a aː/ are closer to Spanish /a/.

In the reverse, there is hardly any Afrikaans influence on the Spanish spoken by the Boer descendants with all speakers using the typical Argentine (Rioplatense) Spanish features (voseo, zheismo/sheismo, and weakening of syllable-final /s/). Some speakers from the rural areas of Sarmiento do have a slight influence in that in between vowels they pronounce /b d g/ as hard plosives instead of softening to /β ð ɣ/ as in Spanish. Words such as todo [toðo] "all" and globo [gloβo] "balloon" are pronounced [todo] and [globo].

=== Lexicon ===
Some words also differ completely, some of which were adapted in the twenty-first century. For example, airport in Afrikaans is lughawe, which is a word that did not exist when the first Boers settled in Argentina. In Patagonia, the word for airport is vliegtuigstasie (lit. 'aeroplane station') or lugskipstasie (lit. 'airship station')). Other examples are listed below.

Comparison of Some Lexical Differences
Patagonian Afrikaans	Standard Afrikaans	Standard Dutch	Spanish	English
vliegtuigstasie/lugskipstasie	lughawe	luchthaven	aeropuerto	airport
lugskip	vliegtuig	vliegtuig	avíon	airplane
kapok	sneeu (or kapok which is used less commonly)	sneeuw	nieve	snow
kapokpop	sneeuman	sneeuwman, sneeuwpop	muñeco de nieve	snowman
leermeester	onderwyser	leraar	maestro/a	teacher
mister	meneer	meneer	señor	mister
goewerment	regering	regering	gobierno	government
juts	regter	rechter	juez(a)	judge
operasiedokter	chirurg	chirurg	cirujano/a	surgeon
maalbolletjie	frikkadel	gehaktbal	albóndiga	meatball
camión	bakkie	vrachtwagen	camión	truck
sí	ja	ja	sí	yes
