= Bible translations into Afrikaans =

There have been several Bible translations into Afrikaans, a language primarily spoken in South Africa and Namibia. The South African Bible Society released full Afrikaans Bibles in 1933, 1953, 1983, and 2020. Other full translations include Die Lewende Bybel (1982), the Nuwe Wêreld-vertaling van die Heilige Skrif (2001), Die Boodskap (2002), the Nuwe Lewende Vertaling (2006), Pad van Waarheid tot die Lewe (2016), and Contemporary Afrikaans Bible (2023). In addition, several individual books were translated into Afrikaans between the 1880s and the 1920s. This was as opinion had started to change that Afrikaans had become a language in its own right separate from Dutch; prior to that, the Dutch Statenbijbel had been used instead.

== Early history ==
The translation of the Bible which was used in the Dutch Reformed Church in the latter half of the nineteenth century was the Statenbijbel.

Arnoldus Pannevis proposed an Afrikaans Bible translation in 1872 in a letter to the Zuid Afrikaan newspaper. CP Hoogenhout published a book called The history of Joseph for Afrikaans children and households in 1873. Pannevis also wrote to the British and Foreign Bible Society in 1874 to request such a translation, but the request was denied.

At around this time (1875) several magazines, small newspapers and other publications in Afrikaans (for speakers regardless of race) increasingly agreed with Pannevis. The publisher of several of these decided in 1878 that an Afrikaans Bible translation must be made, and in 1885 commissioned SJ du Toit to start the translations. These translations were completed: Genesis (1893), Gospel of Matthews (1895), Revelation (1898), and Psalms (1907). Before his death in 1911 Du Toit was working on a translation of the Gospel of Luke. In an Afrikaans magazine at the time, the following translations were also published: Song of Songs (1905), Acts of the Apostles (1908) and Gospel of Mark (1908).

Hoogenhout also completed a translation of the Gospel of Mark, in 1878, though this was never published.

By the 1920s opinion had changed towards Afrikaans as a language in its own right. In 1916, the Dutch Reformed Church created a commission to investigate the possibility of an Afrikaans Bible translation. It was originally thought that the translation should be a rewrite of the Dutch translation using Afrikaans words, and such a translation of the Gospels and Psalms (Vier Evangelië en Die Psalme) was published in 1922, but was not well received by the public. In 1929 the same publication was published, this time in real Afrikaans, and was well received. The translation of the full Bible was published in 1933.

== Full Bible ==
=== 1933, 1953 South African Bible Society ===
The first official Bible translation of the entire Bible from Hebrew and Greek into Afrikaans was completed in 1933 by J. D. du Toit, E. E. van Rooyen, J. D. Kestell, H. C. M. Fourie, G. B. A Gerdener and BB Keet. The Afrikaans Bible was introduced to Afrikaans-speaking Christian community during a Bible Festival in Bloemfontein, on 27 August 1933.

By the 20 year anniversary in 1953, the Afrikaans language had changed quite a bit (since the 1933 translation was translated deliberately in old-fashioned language that resembled the old Dutch Statenvertaling, to prevent it from being rejected by Christians who were used to using the Dutch translation). The 1953 edition contained a number of small changes and changes to the spelling of names. The 1953 edition also introduced copious cross-references that were present in all subsequent prints of that edition.

=== 1982, Die Lewende Bybel, Christelike Uitgewersmaatskappy (CUM) ===
This paraphrase was the first non-official translation of the entire Bible in Afrikaans. It was translated in the tradition of the Living Bible from 1971, using a language and style that is very similar to it. The Bible was translated by Du Toit van der Merwe.

| . | Ezechiel 36:26 | Literal English translation |
|---|---|---|
| 1982, Die Lewende Bybel, Christelike Uitgewersmaatskappy (CUM) | Ek sal julle 'n nuwe hart gee en 'n nuwe gees in julle lewe. Daardie ongehoorsame harte van julle wat so hard soos klip was, sal ek wegneem en julle 'n hart gee wat gewillig is om te luister. | I will give you a new heart, and a new spirit in your life. Those disobedient hearts of yours that were as hard as stone, I will take away and give you a heart that is willing to listen. |
| 1933, 1953, South African Bible Society | En Ek sal julle ’n nuwe hart gee en ’n nuwe gees in jul binneste gee; en Ek sal die hart van klip uit julle vlees wegneem en julle ’n hart van vlees gee. | And I will give you a new heart and give you a new spirit in your insides; and I will take away the heart of stone from your flesh and give you a heart of flesh. |

=== 1983, South African Bible Society ===
In 1983 a new translation was completed in order to mark the 50th anniversary of the original 1933 translation and provide much needed revision in contemporary Afrikaans. Reformulations were published until 1992. The final editors were E. P. Groenewald, A. H. van Zyl, P. A. Verhoef, J. L. Helberg, and W. Kempen.

=== 2001, Nuwe Wêreld-vertaling van die Heilige Skrif, Watchtower Bible and Tract Society ===
The Nuwe Wêreld-vertaling van die Heilige Skrif is an Afrikaans translation of the 1984 English translation of the Bible by the Watchtower Society.

=== 2006, Nuwe Lewende Vertaling, Christelike Uitgewersmaatskappy (CUM) ===
The Nuwe Lewende Vertaling (literally "New Living Translation") was published in 2006. The previous "living translation" in Afrikaans was a paraphrase, but this version is a direct translation. It is a backlash against dynamic equivalence and a return to a more literal translation (the same applies to the Bible Society's new direct translation). The language in this translation sounds rather old-fashioned.

=== 2002, 2006, Die Boodskap, Christelike Uitgewersmaatskappy (CUM) ===
Following the popularity of Eugene Peterson's The Message translation, Stephan Joubert translated the New Testament in a similar idiomatic style of Afrikaans (but without the slang that characterised Peterson's translation), and gave it a similar name, that was published in 2002 as Die Boodskap. With the assistance of Jan van der Watt, the Old Testament was translated and published in 2006, along with improvements in the New Testament translation.

Die Boodskap was recently included in the Youversion app as a downloadable version.

=== 2002, DieBybel@Kinders.co.za, Carpe Diem Media ===
The DieBybel@Kinders.co.za is a verse-by-verse translation of the Bible from the original languages, in modern, conversational Afrikaans. It was originally written as a children's Bible, with the distinction that it was not simply a collection of Bible stories but an actual translation of the entire Bible. The translators are Gert Prinsloo, Phil Botha, Willem Boshoff, Hennie Stander, Dirk Human, Stephan Joubert, and Jan van der Watt.

After the initial publication, the same translation was republished and rebranded for other target groups. These editions used the same text but included additional content, layout, colours, and typography to suit the targeted audience. The rebranded versions included Die Bybel@dogters.co.za (early-teen girls), Die Bybel@seuns.co.za (early-teen boys), Die Bybel@meisies.co.za (late-teen girls), Die Bybel@ouens.co.za (late-teen boys), Die Bybel@mans.co.za (adult men) and Die Bybel@vroue.co.za (adult women). The most recent rebranding is an e-publication containing only the New Testament, called Bybel@Kinders. An edition for teenage girls in glossary magazine format was published under the name "Glans".

=== 2008, Bybel vir Almal, South African Bible Society ===
The Bybel vir Almal was originally published as a Bible for deaf people, as it was specifically translated as a Bible for the deaf. It is not in sign language, but in ordinary Afrikaans, with a more limited vocabulary and sensitivity to issues that deaf people may not understand. Hearing people tend to associate certain sounds with certain emotions, but deaf people don't. For example, hearing people associate a pastoral scene with serenity, partly due to the sounds that accompany it. In verses where the translators were forced to use more difficult words, there are extensive explanatory footnotes that explain the words.

This translation can be read online at the South African Bible Society's web site. The editors included Bart Oberholzer, Bernard Combrink, Hermie van Zyl, Francois Tolmie, Christo van der Merwe, Rocco Hough en Elmine Roux.

=== 2016, Pad van Waarheid tot die Lewe (PWL), PWL Projekte ===
The Pad van Waarheid tot die Lewe translation is a verse-by-verse translation of the biblical source texts into modern Afrikaans, most notably using Aramaic sources exclusively for the New Testament. It was privately translated by Gerrie Coetzee, an ex-missionary, and edited by his wife, Hanlie, and several private individuals.

The PWL translation was translated from the oldest sources freely available at the time. For the Old Testament these included: the Septuagint (LXX), Aleppo Codex, Peshitta Old Testament (POT) and the Masoretic Text. These sources were augmented by fragments found at Qumran, including the Dead Sea Scrolls (DSS). The New Testament was exclusively translated from Aramaic sources, namely the Peshitta, Khabouris and Crawford Manuscript, despite their debatable origins. This has led to a renewed debate surrounding the place of Aramaic as source material for the New Testament.

In 2016, Dr. Chris de Wet of the Department of New Testament Studies at UNISA wrote a review on the PWL translation. He was answered by Coetzee the same year in an open letter posted the PWL website.

The PWL translation is distributed free of charge in both hard copy and as downloadable PDF, theWord and eSword files.

=== 2020, Die Bybel 2020 Edition, South African Bible Society ===
A new translation by the South African Bible Society, meant to replace the 1983 translation, was released in 2020.

The New Testament and Psalms from this new Bible translation was published in March 2014. It is intended as a very direct translation suitable for Bible study and use in churches, and is partly the Bible Society's answer to a competing Bible publisher's recent publication of a very direct translation (the Nuwe Lewende Vertaling). The Nuwe Lewende Vertaling is widely used but not officially sanctioned by the largest Afrikaans churches of South Africa, who usually recommend to their members the translations published by the Bible Society. This new direct translation fills that void.

The translation was done by teams of four individuals each, consisting of English-Afrikaans translators and experts in the original languages. The draft versions of the Bible books were made available on the Bible Society's web site as PDFs, and the public was asked to comment on the translations before the final version was created. This is the first Bible translation that involved participation of the general public in the form of commentary from non-invited parties.

=== 2023, Contemporary Afrikaans Bible, City Bible Foundation ===
The translation is available on Youversion, Online Bible apps (Android, iOS and macOS) and in print. Its text is very different from any other Afrikaans Bible translation. The text has many similarities with the English King James Version and the Dutch Statenvertaling. At the same time, the readability is contemporary Afrikaans. It is published by the City Bible Foundation.

== Partial Bible ==
=== 2014, Afrikaans Standard Version, CUM Books ===
A version of the New Testament called the "Afrikaans Standard Version" was published in 2014 as a parallel Bible with the new "Standard" translation and the New Living Translation. It is practically a word-for-word translation, as it is based on the word-for-word Afrikaans text in the interlinear Bible that was published by CUM Books in 2012. One of the editors of the Bible Society's Direct Translation is also an editor of the Afrikaans Standard Version.

== Comparison ==
| Translation, notes | Phillipians 4:4-7 | Literal English translation |
|---|---|---|
| 1933, 1953, South African Bible Society Direct, deliberately used old-fashioned language, majority text | Verbly julle altyd in die Here; ek herhaal: Verbly julle! Laat julle vriendelikheid aan alle mense bekend word. Die Here is naby. Wees oor niks besorg nie, maar laat julle begeertes in alles deur gebed en smeking met danksegging bekend word by God. En die vrede van God, wat alle verstand te bowe gaan, sal julle harte en julle sinne bewaar in Christus Jesus. | Gladden yourselves always in the Lord; I repeat: Gladden yourselves! Let your friendliness become known to all people. The Lord is near. Be concerned about nothing, but allow your cravings to become known at God in all things through prayer and beseeching with thanksgiving. And the peace of God, which boggles the mind, will preserve your hearts and your senses in Christ Jesus. |
| 1982, Die Lewende Bybel, Christelike Uitgewersmaatskappy (CUM) Paraphrase, first published Afrikaans full Bible translation to use minority text | Julle moet bly wees omdat julle aan die Here verbind is. Ek wil dit nog 'n keer sê: julle moet bly wees! Julle moet almal vriendelik behandel. Onthou die Here kom binnekort terug. Julle moet julle nie oor enigiets bekommer nie. Bid daaroor en sê vir God duidelik wat julle wil hê. Vra Hom om dit vir julle te doen en sê vir Hom dankie! Dan sal God julle sy wonderlike vrede gee wat 'n mens nooit met jou verstand kan verklaar nie. Sy vrede sal wag hou oor julle hart en julle gedagtes omdat julle aan Christus Jesus behoort. | You must be happy because you are connected to the Lord. I want to say it once again: you must be happy! You must treat everyone with friendliness. Remember that the Lord is coming back soon. You must not vex yourself about anything. Pray about it and tell God clearly what you want. Ask him to do it for you and thank Him! Then God will give you his wonderful peace that one can never explain with your intellect. His peace will stand guard over your heart and your thoughts because you belong to Christ Jesus. |
| 1975, 1983, South African Bible Society Direct, dynamic equivalence, first Afrikaans Bible translation project to use minority text | Wees altyd bly in die Here! Ek herhaal: Wees bly! Wees inskiklik teenoor alle mense. Die Here is naby. Moet oor niks besorg wees nie, maar maak in alles julle begeertes deur gebed en smeking en met danksegging aan God bekend. En die vrede van God wat alle verstand te bowe gaan, sal oor julle harte en gedagtes die wag hou in Christus Jesus. | Always be happy in the Lord! I repeat: Be happy! Be complaisant towards all people. The Lord is near. Be concerned about nothing, but in everything make your cravings known to God through prayer and beseeching and with thanksgiving. And the peace of God that boggles the mind, will keep a watch over your hearts and thoughts in Christ Jesus. |
| 2001, Nuwe Wêreld-vertaling van die Heilige Skrif, Watchtower Bible and Tract Society Direct, translated from English | Verbly julle altyd in die Here. Weer eens sal ek sê: Verbly julle! Laat julle redelikheid aan alle mense bekend word. Die Here is naby. Moet julle oor niks kwel nie, maar laat julle versoeke in alles deur gebed en smeking tesame met danksegging by God bekend word; en die vrede van God wat alle denke te bowe gaan, sal julle harte en julle verstandelike vermoëns deur middel van Christus Jesus bewaak. | Gladden yourselves always in the Lord. Again I will say: Gladden yourselves! Let your reasonableness become known to all people. The Lord is near. Be vexed about nothing, but allow your requests to become known at God in all things through prayer and beseeching along with thanksgiving; and the peace of God, which boggles all thought, will guard over your hearts and your intellectual abilities by means of Christ Jesus. |
| 2006, Nuwe Lewende Vertaling, Christelike Uitgewersmaatskappy (CUM) Direct, post-dynamic equivalence | Wees altyd bly omdat julle weet dat julle aan die Here behoort. Ek sê dit weer: "Wees bly!" Laat almal sien hoe bedagsaam julle lewe. Onthou: Die Here kom binnekort! Moet oor niks bekommerd wees nie, maar bid oor alles. Vra alles wat julle nodig het van God, terwyl julle Hom ook dank vir alles wat Hy doen. En God se vrede, wat meer is as wat ’n mens dink, sal oor julle harte en gedagtes die wag hou omdat julle aan Christus Jesus verbonde is. | Always be happy because you know that you belong to the Lord. I say it again: "Be happy!" Let every see how considerate you live. Remember: The Lord is coming soon! Be worried about nothing, but pray about everything. Ask everything that you need of God, while you also thank Him for everything that He does. And God's peace, which is more than one might think, will keep watch over your hearts and thoughts because you are associated with Christ Jesus. |
| 2002, 2006, Die Boodskap, Christelike Uitgewersmaatskappy (CUM) Free/idiomatic, dynamic equivalence | Julle hart behoort oor te loop van blydskap omdat julle aan die Here behoort. Ek sê weer, julle moet baie bly wees. Moenie vergeet om almal mooi te behandel nie. Die Here kom mos binnekort terug. Moenie oor dinge sit en tob of jou bekommer nie. Gaan praat met God daaroor. Bespreek dit met Hom. Vertel Hom hoe jy daaroor voel. Sê dan vir Hom dankie dat jy met Hom daaroor kan praat en dat Hy die beste weet. Jy sal dan verlig en tevrede voel. Jy sal hierdie verligte gevoel nie altyd kan verklaar of wetenskaplik kan uitlê nie. Omdat jy egter weet dat jy aan Jesus behoort, sal jy nie meer omgekrap voel nie. Hierdie wete dat Jesus by jou is, sal keer dat die bekommernisse weer met jou emosies weghardloop of dat jy jou weer van voor af begin bekommer. | Your (plural) heart (singular) should overflow of joy because you belong to the Lord. I say again, you must be very happy. Do not forget to treat everyone nicely. After all, the Lord is coming back soon. Do not brood over things or worry about yourself (singular). Go and talk to God about it. Discuss it with Him. Tell Him how you feel about it. Then thank him that you can talk to Him about it and that He knows best. You will then feel relieved and satisfied. You will not always be able to explain this relieved feeling or give a scientific explanation for it. But because you know that you belong to Jesus, you will no longer be in a bad mood. This knowledge that Jesus is with you, will prevent your worries from running away with your emotions again or prevent you from starting to worry all over again. |
| 2002, DieBybel@Kinders.co.za, Carpe Diem Media Free/idiomatic, dynamic equivalence | Wees altyd vrolik en bly, want jy is Jesus se kind. Wees altyd gaaf en vriendelik met jou vriende en ander mense. Onthou dat die Here jou gaan kom haal om saam met Hom hemel toe te gaan. As jou hart seer is, of jy bang is of miskien nie weet wat om te doen nie, gaan vra God om jou te help. Bid en vertel Hom hoe jy hier binnekant voel. Hy sal jou help, want Hy kan jou help. Moenie bang wees dat Hy jou ooit sal vergeet nie. As jy gebid het, hoef jy nie meer bang te wees nie. Jesus is mos jou goeie Vriend. Al verdwyn al die dinge waarvoor jy bang is nie dadelik nie, kan jy maar solank vir die Here baie dankie sê. Hy sal jou help. Daarvan kan jy seker wees. | Always be merry and glad, because you are Jesus' child. Always be amiable and friendly with your friends and other people. Remember that the Lord will come and get you to go to heaven with Him. If your heart aches, or if you are scared or maybe don't know what to do, go ask God to help you. Pray and tell Him how you feel here on the inside. He will help you, because He can help you. Do not be afraid that He will ever forget you. If you have prayed, you no longer need to be afraid. After all, Jesus is your good Friend. Even if the things that you afraid of, do not disappear immediately, you can say thank you very much to the Lord in the meantime. He will help you. You can be certain of that. |
| 2008, Bybel vir Almal, South African Bible Society Direct/limited vocabulary, dynamic equivalence | Julle behoort aan die Here. Daarom moet julle altyd bly wees! Ek sê dit weer, julle moet bly wees! Julle moet vriendelik en geduldig wees met al die mense, want die Here sal gou weer kom! Julle moenie bekommerd wees nie. Julle moet ernstig bid tot God, julle moet vir Hom sê wat julle nodig het en julle moet vir Hom dankie sê daarvoor. Julle behoort aan Christus Jesus. Daarom sal God vir julle vrede gee, vrede wat baie beter is as enige iets waaraan mense kan dink, vrede wat die dinge beskerm wat julle dink. | You belong to the Lord. For that reason, you must always be happy! I say it again, you must be happy! You must be friendly and patient with all the people, because the Lord will come again quickly! You must not be worried. You must pray seriously to God, you must say to Him what you need and you must say thank you to Him for it. You belong to Christ Jesus. For that reason, God will give you peace, peace that is much better than anything that people can think of, peace that protect the things that you think. |
| 2014, Afrikaans Standard Version, CUM Books Direct, word-for-word | Julle moet altyd bly wees in die Here; ek sal dit weer sê, julle moet bly wees! Laat julle verdraagsaamheid aan alle mense bekend word! Die Here is naby! Wees oor niks bekommerd nie, maar laat in alles julle versoeke deur gebed en smeking, met danksegging, aan God bekend word. En die vrede van God wat alle verstand oortref, sal julle harte en gedagtes in Christus Jesus bewaak. | You must always be happy in the Lord; I say it again, you must be happy! Let your tolerability become known to all people! The Lord is near! Be worried about nothing, but let your requests in everything become known to God through prayer and begging, with thanksgiving. And the peace of God that exceeds all intellect, will keep watch over your hearts and thoughts in Christ Jesus. |
| 2016, Pad van Waarheid tot die Lewe, PWL Sentrum | Verheug julle in eenheid met ons Meester; ek sê weer: verheug julle! Laat alle mense julle nederigheid sien. Ons Meester is naby. Wees oor niks bekommerd nie, maar maak julle begeertes elke keer deur gebed, versoeke en danksegging by God bekend, en die vrede, vreugde, gesondheid, voorspoed en vergenoegdheid van God, Hy wat ver bo alle kennis en begrip is, sal julle gedagtes, wil, emosie en julle begrip beskerm in eenheid met Yeshua, Die Gesalfde Een;. | Delight yourself in unity with our Master; I say again: delight yourselves! Let all people see your humility. Our Master is near. Be worried about nothing, but make your desires known to God every time through prayer, requests and thanksgiving, and the peace, joy, health, prosperity and contentment of God, He who is far above all knowledge and understanding, will protect your thoughts, will, emotion, and your understanding in union with Yeshua, the Anointed One. |
| 2020, South African Bible Society Direct, post-dynamic equivalence, liturgical | Verbly julle altyd in die Here! Ek herhaal: Verbly julle! Laat julle vriendelikheid aan alle mense bekend word. Die Here is naby. Moet oor niks bekommerd wees nie, maar maak in alles julle versoeke deur gebed en smeking met danksegging aan God bekend. En die vrede van God, wat alle begrip oortref, sal in Christus Jesus oor julle harte en gedagtes waak. | Gladden yourselves always in the Lord! I repeat: Gladden yourselves! Let your friendliness become known to all people. The Lord is near. [You] must be worried about nothing, but make your requests in everything become known to God through prayer and begging, with thanksgiving. And the peace of God, that exceeds all understanding, will keep watch over your hearts and thoughts in Christ Jesus. |
| 2023, Contemporary Afrikaans Bible, City Bible Foundation | Wees altyd bly in die Here, en ek sê weer: Wees bly. Laat julle matigheid aan alle mense bekend wees. Die Here is byderhand. Pasop vir niks; maar laat julle begeertes in alles deur gebed en smeking met danksegging bekend word by God. En die vrede van God wat alle verstand te bowe gaan, sal julle harte en sinne bewaar deur Christus Jesus. | Always be happy in the Lord, and I say again: Be happy. Let your moderateness be known to all people. The Lord is on hand. Watch out for nothing; but allow your cravings to become known at God in all things through prayer and beseeching with thanksgiving. And the peace of God that boggles the mind, will preserve your hearts and your senses through Christ Jesus. |

== See also ==
- Afrikaans literature
- Bible translations by language
- Religion in South Africa
- Bible Translations#The Bible in Afrikaans (in Afrikaans)
