= Afrikaans =

West Germanic language spoken in South Africa

- Pronunciation: [afriˈkɑːns]
- Native to: South Africa; Namibia
- Region: Southern Africa
- Ethnicity: Afrikaners; Coloureds
- Native speakers: 7.2 million (2016); 10.3 million L2 speakers in South Africa (2011)
- Language family: Indo-European: Germanic; West Germanic; Weser–Rhine Germanic; Low Franconian; Dutch; Central Dutch; Hollandic; Afrikaans
- Early forms: Frankish: Old Dutch; Middle Dutch; 17th-century Hollandic
- Dialects: Kaaps; Boeraans; Eastern Cape; Northern Cape; Patagonian; Namibian
- Writing system: Latin script (Afrikaans alphabet), Arabic script
- Signed forms: Signed Afrikaans

Official status
- Official language in: South Africa
- Recognised minority language in: Namibia
- Regulated by: Die Taalkommissie

Language codes
- ISO 639-1: af
- ISO 639-2: afr
- ISO 639-3: afr
- Glottolog: afri1274
- Linguasphere: 52-ACB-ba
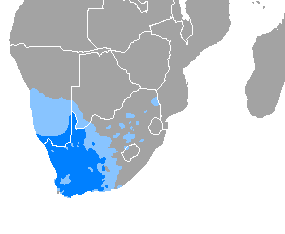
- spoken by a majority spoken by a minority

Colin speaking Afrikaans

Alaric speaking Afrikaans

Rossouw speaking Afrikaans

Afrikaans (Note: /ˌæfrɪˈkɑːns/ AF-rih-KAHNSS, /ˌɑːf-, -ˈkɑːnz/ AHF-, -KAHNZ) is a West Germanic language spoken in South Africa, Namibia, and to a lesser extent Botswana, Zambia, Zimbabwe, and also in Argentina, where a group in Sarmiento speaks a Patagonian dialect, and among the South African diaspora (particularly in Australia, New Zealand, North America and the United Kingdom). It emerged during the late 19th century as a fusion of Dutch dialects (mainly Hollandic and Zeelandic) spoken by the Dutch settlers in South Africa since the 17th century and the Dutch-based creole languages spoken by the Khoisan, Nguni and Coloured peoples.

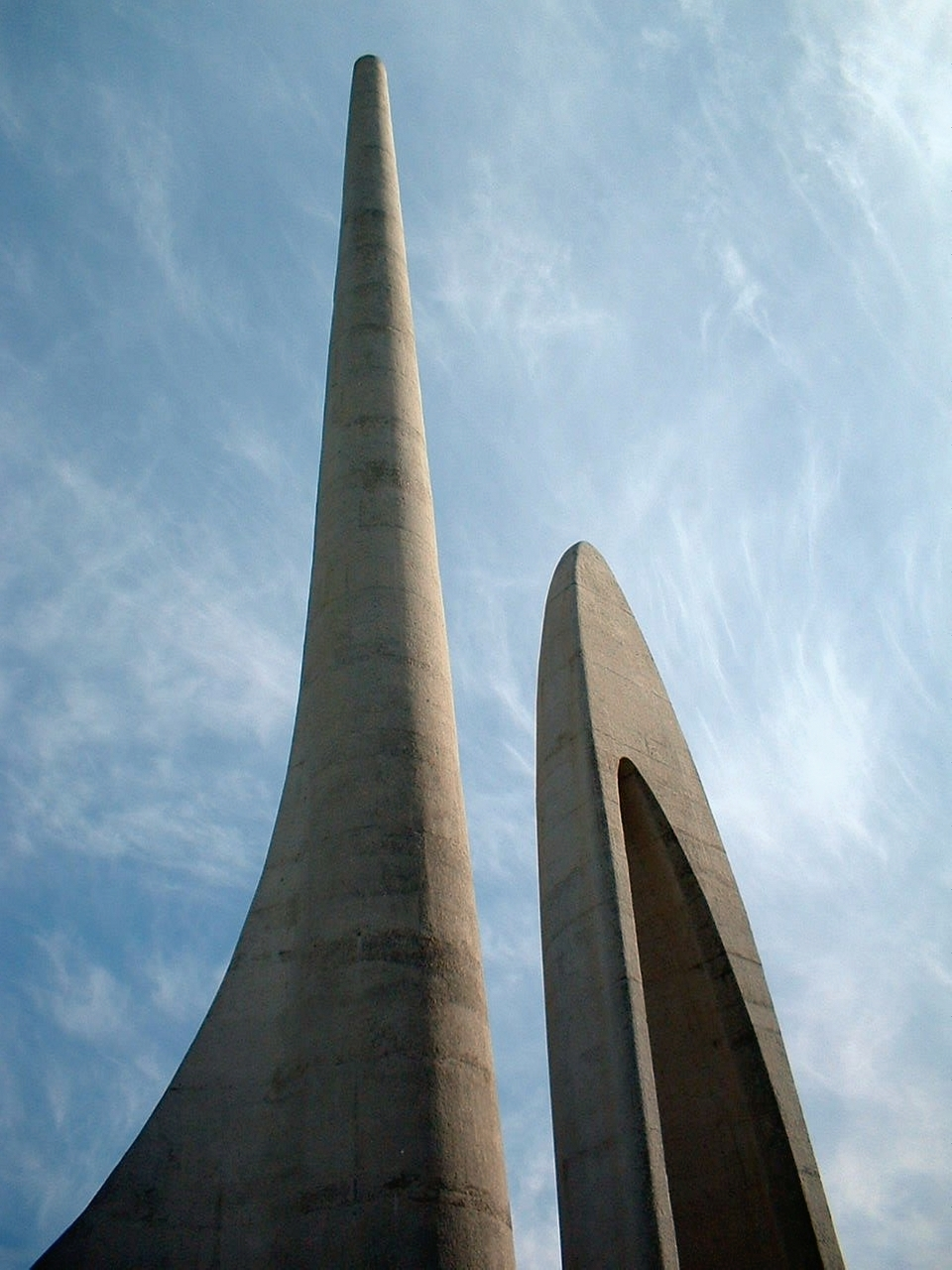
Obelisks of the Afrikaans Language Monument near Paarl

Afrikaans is the third most spoken home language in South Africa, out of the country's 12 official languages. In 1996 it was spoken by 14.5% of the population, an estimated 5.9 million people. By 2022 that had fallen to 10.6% (6.3 million people), with Afrikaans gaining roughly 480,000 speakers overall. Although Afrikaans has adopted words from other languages, including German, Malay, and Khoisan languages, an estimated 90 to 95% of its vocabulary is of Dutch origin. (Note: Afrikaans borrowed from other languages such as Portuguese, German, Malay, Bantu, and Khoisan languages; see Sebba 1997, p. 160, Niesler, Louw & Roux 2005, p. 459. Ninety to ninety-five percent of Afrikaans vocabulary is ultimately of Dutch origin; see Mesthrie 1995, p. 214, Mesthrie 2002, p. 205, Kamwangamalu 2004, p. 203, Berdichevsky 2004, p. 131, Brachin & Vincent 1985, p. 132.) Differences between Afrikaans and Dutch often lie in the more analytic morphology and grammar of Afrikaans, and different spellings. (Note: For morphology; see Holm 1989, p. 338, Geerts & Clyne 1992, p. 72. For grammar and spelling; see Sebba 1997, p. 161.) There is a large degree of mutual intelligibility between the two languages, especially in written form.

== Etymology ==
The language's name comes directly from the Dutch word Afrikaansch (now spelled Afrikaans) (Note: The changed spelling rule was introduced in article 1, rule 3, of the Dutch "orthography law" of 14 February 1947. In 1954 the Word list of the Dutch language which regulates the spelling of individual words including the word Afrikaans was first published.) meaning 'African'. It was previously called 'Cape Dutch' (Kaap-Hollands or Kaap-Nederlands), a term also used to refer to the early Cape settlers collectively, or the derogatory 'kitchen Dutch' (kombuistaal) from its use by slaves of colonial settlers "in the kitchen".

== History ==
=== Origin ===
For a long time, the so-called Eastern Border Hypothesis of the South African linguist Prof. Dr. Christo van Rensburg (1938–2018) was regarded as the scientific consensus explaining the development and standardization of Afrikaans. According to this hypothesis, the Dutch dialect spoken on the eastern frontier of the Cape Colony was to be seen as a direct and natural development of the Dutch dialects (particularly Hollandic and Zeelandic varieties) spoken by the Trekboers, while the two other major dialects, Kaaps and Orange River Afrikaans, were considered to have undergone substantial creolization. This was attributed to the fact that, in these regions, a significant proportion of speakers had acquired Dutch not as their first language but as a second language. According to Van Rensburg, Eastern Border Afrikaans developed around 1775 into a stable and comparatively homogeneous Dutch dialect form, which became increasingly standardized and written down during the 19th century; particularly in the period after 1806–1820, when European Dutch began being replaced by English as the official and administrative language.

More recent research, however, has concluded that the development of Afrikaans was considerably more complex than this and Afrikaans appears to have developed considerably more gradually and diversely than originally assumed. Instead of a single more or less unified dialect developing into a standardized language over the course of the 19th century, South Africa was characterized by a highly diverse linguistic landscape until the early twentieth century, with language communities ranging from some in which Dutch was used in schools and at home, differing little, if at all, from contemporary Dutch in Europe, to communities (often consisting of black, mixed or non-Dutch European immigrants) for whom Dutch was a second or even third language. These speech communities were interconnected through highly complex patterns of linguistic and social interaction, with the choice and use of a particular varieties depending on language proficiency and sociolinguistic factors such as social class, ethnicity, and race.

In the late eighteenth century, a written tradition emerged that made conspicuous use of features associated with these highly diverse South African dialects and sociolects. The earliest deliberate imitation of colloquial speech, dating from 1795, is found in the anonymous poem Gedicht Lied ter eere van de Swellendamsche en diverse andere helden bij de bloedige actie aan Muizenberg (“Song in honor of the heroes of Swellendam and various other heroes at the bloody Battle of Muizenberg”), which mocks the inhabitants of Swellendam. During the following century, this developed into a distinctive writing tradition, in which Dutch texts increasingly incorporated stereotypical features of the various non-standard varieties spoken in South Africa. This use of local vernacular, much of which was considered rustic, colonial or uncouth by the Dutch and Cape Dutch of the time period, became increasingly deliberate and became closely associated with broader processes of social identity formation, in which the Boers increasingly asserted a distinct identity from both the British and the Dutch-speaking urban population of Cape Town.

In the late 19th and early 20th centuries, the codification and institutionalization of Afrikaans accelerated considerably. In 1875, the Genootskap van Regte Afrikaners was founded with the explicit aim of establishing spoken Afrikaans as a written language. Dutch spelling reforms promoted and proposed in 1891 by the Dutch linguist Roeland Kollewijn, with its emphasis on phonetic spelling, were generally regarded in the Netherlands and Belgium as being “too modernistic” or even “demeaning.” In South Africa, by contrast, Kollewijn’s Vereenvoudigde Nederlandse spelling (“Simplified Dutch Spelling”) was seen as bridging the increasing gap between the written and spoken language and adopted in 1905 as the official orthography of the Dutch language in South Africa and subsequently served as the basis for modern Afrikaans orthography.

=== Development ===
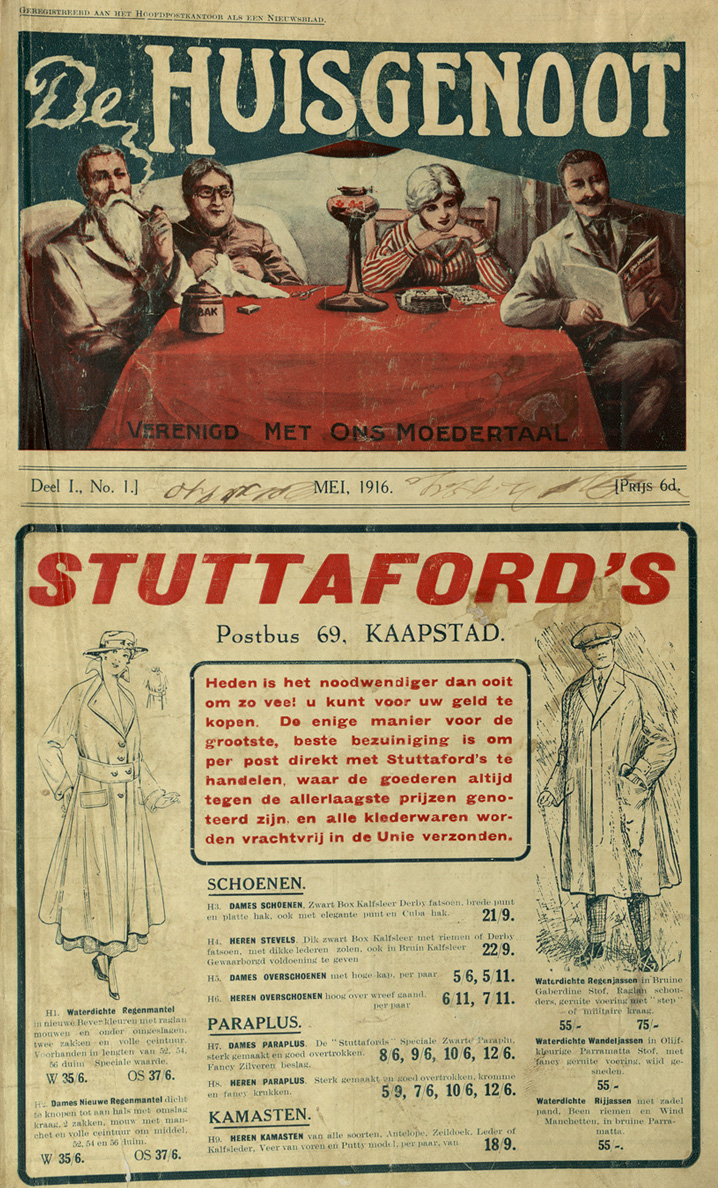
Standard Dutch used in a 1916 South African newspaper before Afrikaans replaced it for use in media

Most of the first settlers whose descendants today are the Afrikaners were from the United Provinces (now Netherlands), with up to one-sixth of the community of French Huguenot origin, and a seventh from Germany.

African and Asian workers, Cape Coloured children of European settlers and Khoikhoi women, and slaves contributed to the development of Afrikaans. The slave population comprised people from East Africa, West Africa, Mughal India, Madagascar, and the Dutch East Indies (modern Indonesia). Many were also indigenous Khoisan people, who were valued as interpreters, domestic servants, and labourers. Many free and enslaved women married or cohabited with male Dutch settlers. M. F. Valkhoff argued that 75% of children born to female slaves in the Dutch Cape Colony between 1652 and 1672 had a Dutch father. Sarah Grey Thomason and Terrence Kaufman argue that Afrikaans' development as a separate language was "heavily conditioned by nonwhites who learned Dutch imperfectly as a second language."

Beginning in about 1815, Afrikaans started to replace Malay as the language of instruction in Muslim schools in South Africa, written in Arabic Afrikaans. These are the earliest known works written in Afrikaans, at a time when Standard Dutch was the main written language. Later, Afrikaans, now written with the Latin script, started to appear in newspapers and political and religious works in around 1850 (alongside the already established Dutch).

In 1875 a group of Afrikaans-speakers from the Cape formed the Genootskap vir Regte Afrikaaners ('Society for Real Afrikaners'), and published a number of books in Afrikaans, including grammars, dictionaries, religious materials, and histories.

Until the early 20th century Afrikaans was considered a Dutch dialect, alongside Standard Dutch, which it eventually replaced as an official language. Before the Boer wars, "and indeed for some time afterwards, Afrikaans was regarded as inappropriate for educated discourse. Rather, Afrikaans was described derogatorily as 'a kitchen language' or 'a bastard jargon', suitable for communication mainly between the Boers and their servants."

=== Recognition ===
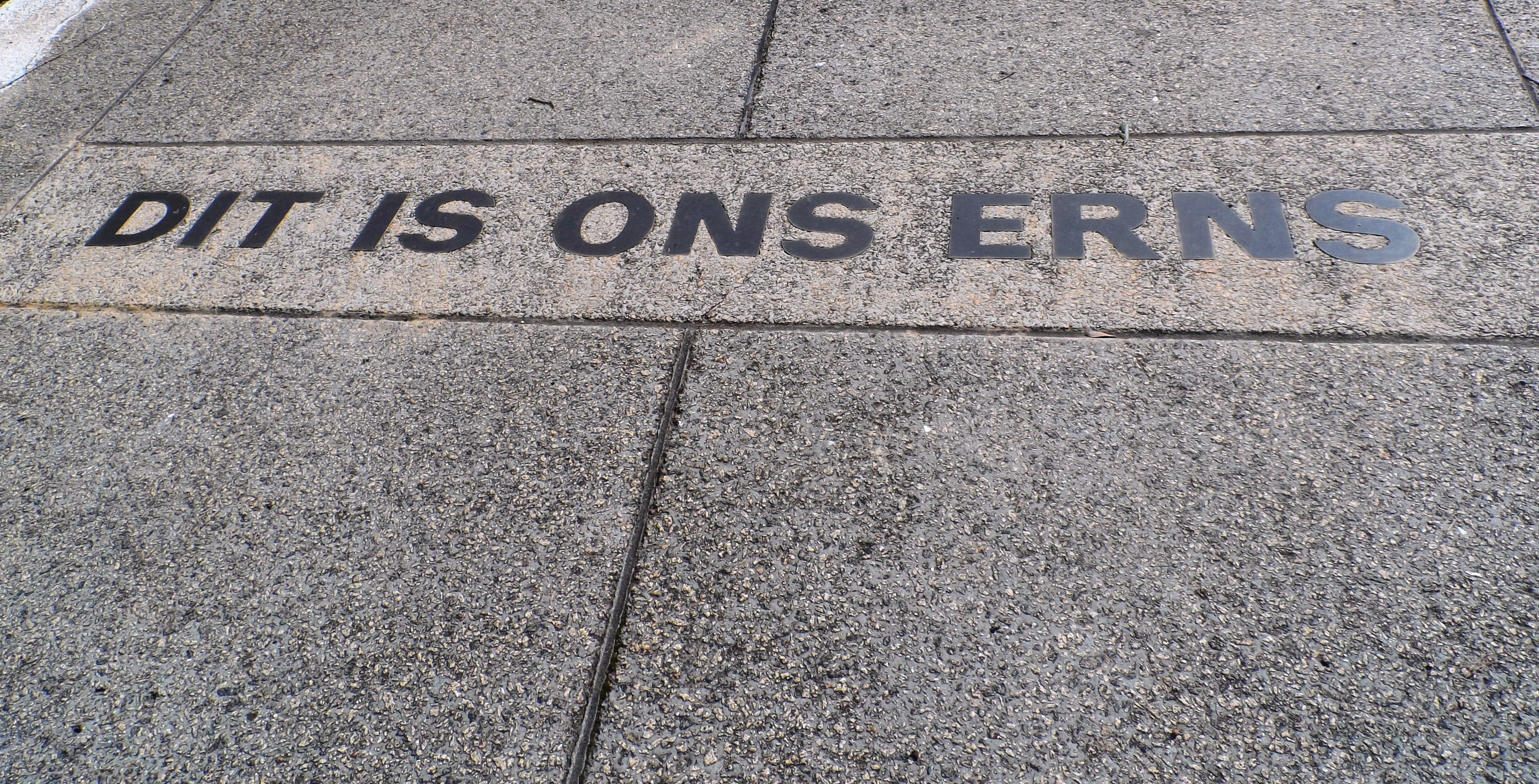
"Dit is ons erns" ("This is our earnestness"), at the Afrikaans Language Monument

In 1925 Afrikaans was recognised by the South African government as a distinct language rather than simply a vernacular of Dutch. On 8 May 1925, 23 years after the Second Boer War ended, the Official Languages of the Union Act, 1925 was passed—mostly due to the efforts of the Afrikaans language movement—at a joint sitting of the House of Assembly and the Senate, in which the Afrikaans language was declared a variety of Dutch. The Constitution of 1961 reversed the position of Afrikaans and Dutch, so that English and Afrikaans were the official languages and Afrikaans was deemed to include Dutch. The Constitution of 1983 removed any mention of Dutch altogether.

The Afrikaans Language Monument is on a hill overlooking Paarl in the Western Cape Province. Officially opened on 10 October 1975, it was erected on the 100th anniversary of the founding of the Society of Real Afrikaners, and the 50th anniversary of Afrikaans being declared an official language of South Africa in distinction to Dutch.

=== Standardisation ===
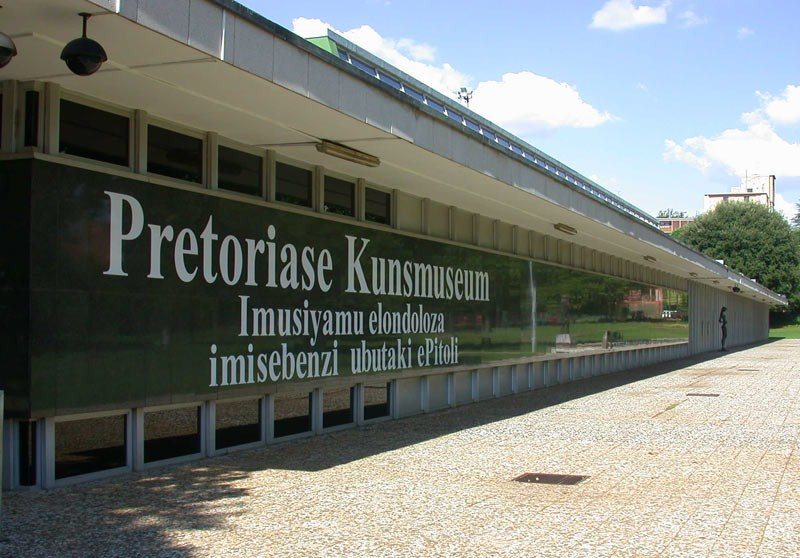
The side view of the Pretoria Art Museum, in Arcadia, Pretoria, with its name written in Afrikaans, Xhosa and Southern Ndebele

The earliest Afrikaans texts were some doggerel verses from 1795 and a dialogue transcribed by a Dutch traveller in 1825. Afrikaans used the Latin alphabet around this time, although the Cape Muslim community used the Arabic script. In 1861, L. H. Meurant published his Zamenspraak tusschen Klaas Waarzegger en Jan Twyfelaar (Conversation between Nicholas Truthsayer and John Doubter), which is considered the first book published in Afrikaans.

The first grammar book was published in 1876; a bilingual dictionary was published in 1902. The main modern Afrikaans dictionary in use is the Verklarende Handwoordeboek van die Afrikaanse Taal (HAT). A new authoritative dictionary, Woordeboek van die Afrikaanse Taal (WAT), was under development As of 2018. The official orthography of Afrikaans is the Afrikaanse Woordelys en Spelreëls, compiled by Die Taalkommissie.

=== The Afrikaans Bible ===
The Afrikaners primarily were Protestants, of the Dutch Reformed Church of the 17th century. Their religious practices were later influenced in South Africa by British ministries during the 1800s. A landmark in the language's development was the translation of the Bible into Afrikaans. While significant advances had been made in the textual criticism of the Bible, especially the Greek New Testament, the 1933 translation followed the Textus Receptus and was closely akin to the Statenbijbel. Before this, most Cape Dutch-Afrikaans speakers had to rely on the Dutch Statenbijbel. This Statenvertaling had its origins with the Synod of Dordrecht of 1618 and was thus in an archaic form of Dutch. This was hard for Dutch speakers to understand, and increasingly unintelligible for Afrikaans speakers.

C. P. Hoogehout, Arnoldus Pannevis, and Stephanus Jacobus du Toit were the first Afrikaans Bible translators. An important landmark in the translation of the Scriptures as C. P. Hoogehout's 1878 translation of the Evangelie volgens Markus (Gospel of Mark, lit. 'Gospel according to Mark'), but it was never published. The manuscript is in the South African National Library, Cape Town.

The first official translation of the entire Bible into Afrikaans was in 1933 by J. D. du Toit, E. E. van Rooyen, J. D. Kestell, H. C. M. Fourie, and BB Keet. This monumental work established Afrikaans as 'n suiwer en ordentlike taal—"a pure and proper language" for religious purposes, especially among the deeply Calvinist Afrikaans religious community that previously had been sceptical of a Bible translation that varied from the Dutch version they were used to.

In 1983 a fresh translation marked the 50th anniversary of the 1933 version. It was edited by E. P. Groenewald, A. H. van Zyl, P. A. Verhoef, J. L. Helberg and W. Kempen. It was influenced by Eugene Nida's theory of dynamic equivalence, which focused on finding the nearest equivalent in the receptor language to the idea that the Greek, Hebrew, or Aramaic conveyed.

A new translation, Die Bybel: 'n Direkte Vertaling was released in November 2020. It is the first truly ecumenical translation of the Bible in Afrikaans as translators from various churches, including the Roman Catholic and Anglican Churches, were involved.

=== Classification ===
- Indo-European languages
  - Germanic
    - West Germanic
      - Low Franconian
        - Dutch
          - Afrikaans

Afrikaans descended from Dutch dialects in the 17th century. It belongs to a West Germanic sub-group, the Low Franconian languages. Other West Germanic languages related to Afrikaans are German, English, the Frisian languages, Yiddish, and the unstandardised language Low German.

== Geographic distribution ==
=== Statistics ===
The geographical distribution of Afrikaans in South Africa: proportion of the population that speaks Afrikaans at home 0–20% 20–40% 40–60% 60–80% 80–100%

Country	Speakers	Percentage of speakers	Year	Reference
South Africa	6,365,488	94.71%	2022	
Namibia	219,760	3.04%	2011	
Australia	49,375	0.68%	2021	
New Zealand	36,966	0.51%	2018	
Canada	29,670	0.41%	2021	
United States	28,406	0.39%	2016	
Botswana	8,082	0.11%	2011	
United Kingdom	7,489	0.10%	2021	
Pakistan	2,228	0.03%	2016	
Argentina	650	0.01%	2019	
Finland	150	0.002%	2023	
Mauritius	36	0.0005%	2011	
Total	7,237,894			

=== Sociolinguistics ===
The geographical distribution of Afrikaans in South Africa: density of Afrikaans home-language speakers <1 /km^{2} 1–3 /km^{2} 3–10 /km^{2} 10–30 /km^{2} 30–100 /km^{2} 100–300 /km^{2} 300–1000 /km^{2} 1000–3000 /km^{2} >3000 /km^{2}

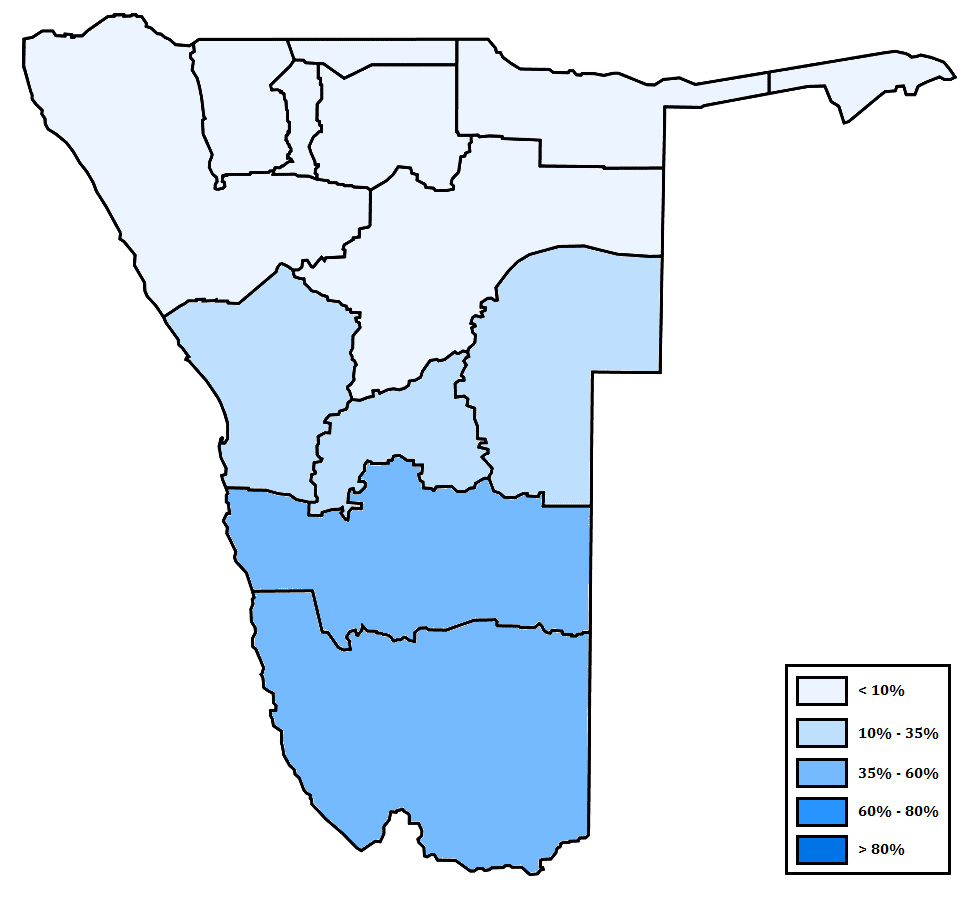
The geographical distribution of Afrikaans in Namibia

Besides South-Africa, Afrikaans is also widely spoken in Namibia. Before independence, Afrikaans had equal status with German as an official language. Since independence in 1990, Afrikaans has had constitutional recognition as a national, but not official, language. There is a much smaller number of Afrikaans speakers among Zimbabwe's white minority, as most have left the country since 1980. Afrikaans was also a medium of instruction for schools in Bophuthatswana, an Apartheid-era Bantustan. Eldoret, Kenya, was founded by Afrikaners.

There are also around 30,000 South Africans in the Netherlands, of which the majority are of Afrikaans-speaking Afrikaner and Coloured South-African descent. A much smaller and unknown number of Afrikaans speakers also reside in the Dutch Caribbean.

Contrary to popular belief, the majority of Afrikaans speakers today are not Afrikaners or Boers, but Coloureds.

In 1976, secondary-school pupils in Soweto began a rebellion in response to the government's decision that Afrikaans be used as the language of instruction for half the subjects taught in non-White schools (with English continuing for the other half). Although English is the mother tongue of only 8.2% of the population, it is the language most widely understood, and the second language of a majority of South Africans. Afrikaans is more widely spoken than English in the Northern and Western Cape provinces, several hundred kilometres from Soweto. The Black community's opposition to Afrikaans and preference for continuing English instruction was underlined when the government rescinded the policy one month after the uprising: 96% of Black schools chose English (over Afrikaans or native languages) as the language of instruction. Afrikaans-medium schools were also accused of using language policy to deter Black African parents. Some of these parents, in part supported by provincial departments of education, initiated litigation which enabled enrolment with English as language of instruction. By 2006 there were 300 single-medium Afrikaans schools, compared to 2,500 in 1994, after most converted to dual-medium education. Due to Afrikaans being viewed as the "language of the white oppressor" by some, pressure has been increased to remove Afrikaans as a teaching language in South African universities, resulting in bloody student protests in 2015.

Under South Africa's Constitution of 1996, Afrikaans remains an official language, and has equal status to English and ten other languages. The new policy means that the use of Afrikaans is now often reduced in favour of English, or to accommodate the other official languages. In 1996, for example, the South African Broadcasting Corporation reduced the amount of television airtime in Afrikaans, while South African Airways dropped its Afrikaans name Suid-Afrikaanse Lugdiens from its livery. Similarly, South Africa's diplomatic missions overseas now display the name of the country only in English and their host country's language, and not in Afrikaans. Meanwhile, the constitution of the Western Cape, which went into effect in 1998, declares Afrikaans to be an official language of the province alongside English and Xhosa.

The Afrikaans-language general-interest family magazine Huisgenoot has the largest readership of any magazine in the country.

When the British design magazine Wallpaper described Afrikaans as "one of the world's ugliest languages" in its September 2005 article about the monument, South African billionaire Johann Rupert (chairman of the Richemont Group), responded by withdrawing advertising for brands such as Cartier, Van Cleef & Arpels, Montblanc and Alfred Dunhill from the magazine. The author of the article, Bronwyn Davies, was an English-speaking South African.

=== Mutual intelligibility with Dutch ===
An estimated 90 to 95 percent of the Afrikaans lexicon is ultimately of Dutch origin, and there are few lexical differences between the two languages. Afrikaans has a considerably more regular morphology, grammar, and spelling. There is a high degree of mutual intelligibility between the two languages, particularly in written form.

Afrikaans acquired some lexical and syntactical borrowings from other languages such as Malay, Khoisan languages, Portuguese, German and Bantu languages. Afrikaans has also been significantly influenced by South African English, especially in the Western Cape. Dutch speakers are confronted with fewer non-cognates when listening to Afrikaans than the other way round. Mutual intelligibility thus tends to be asymmetrical, as it is easier for Dutch speakers to understand Afrikaans than for Afrikaans speakers to understand Dutch.

In general, mutual intelligibility between Dutch and Afrikaans is far better than between Dutch and Frisian or between Danish and Swedish. The South African poet writer Breyten Breytenbach, attempting to visualise the language distance for Anglophones, once remarked that the differences between (Standard) Dutch and Afrikaans are comparable to those between the Received Pronunciation and Southern American English.

== Current status ==
Use of Afrikaans as a first language by province
Province	1996	2001	2011	2022
Western Cape	58.5%	55.3%	49.7%	41.2%
Eastern Cape	9.8%	9.6%	10.6%	9.6%
Northern Cape	57.2%	56.6%	53.8%	54.6%
Free State	14.4%	11.9%	12.7%	10.3%
KwaZulu-Natal	1.6%	1.5%	1.6%	1.0%
North West	8.8%	8.8%	9.0%	5.2%
Gauteng	15.6%	13.6%	12.4%	7.7%
Mpumalanga	7.1%	5.5%	7.2%	3.2%
Limpopo	2.6%	2.6%	2.6%	2.3%
South Africa	14.4%	13.3%	13.5%	10.6%

Afrikaans is an official language of the Republic of South Africa and a recognised national language of the Republic of Namibia. Post-apartheid South Africa has seen a loss of preferential treatment by the government for Afrikaans, in terms of education, social events, media (TV and radio), and general status throughout the country, given that it now shares its place as official language with ten other languages. Nevertheless, Afrikaans remains more prevalent in the media – radio, newspapers and television – than any of the other official languages except English. More than 300 book titles in Afrikaans are published annually. South African census figures suggest a decreasing number of first language Afrikaans speakers in South Africa from 13.5% in 2011 to 10.6% in 2022. The South African Institute of Race Relations (SAIRR) projects that a growing majority of Afrikaans speakers will be Coloured. Afrikaans speakers experience higher employment rates than other South African language groups, though as of 2012 half a million were unemployed.

Despite the challenges of demotion and emigration that it faces in South Africa, the Afrikaans vernacular remains competitive, being popular in DStv pay-TV channels and several internet sites, while generating high newspaper and music CD sales. A resurgence in Afrikaans popular music since the late 1990s has invigorated the language, especially among a younger generation of South Africans. A recent trend is the increased availability of pre-school educational CDs and DVDs. Such media also prove popular with the extensive Afrikaans-speaking emigrant communities who seek to retain language proficiency in a household context.

Afrikaans-language cinema showed signs of new vigour in the early 21st century. The 2007 film Ouma se slim kind, the first full-length Afrikaans movie since Paljas in 1998, is seen as the dawn of a new era in Afrikaans cinema. Several short films have been created and more feature-length movies, such as Poena Is Koning and Bakgat (both in 2008) have been produced, besides the 2011 Afrikaans-language film Skoonheid, which was the first Afrikaans film to screen at the Cannes Film Festival. The film Platteland was also released in 2011. The Afrikaans film industry started gaining international recognition via the likes of big Afrikaans Hollywood film stars, like Charlize Theron (Monster) and Sharlto Copley (District 9) promoting their mother tongue.

SABC 3 announced early in 2009 that it would increase Afrikaans programming due to the "growing Afrikaans-language market and [their] need for working capital as Afrikaans advertising is the only advertising that sells in the current South African television market". In April 2009, SABC3 started screening several Afrikaans-language programmes. There is a groundswell movement within Afrikaans to be inclusive, and to promote itself along with the indigenous official languages. In Namibia, the percentage of Afrikaans speakers declined from 11.4% (2001 Census) to 10.4% (2011 Census). The major concentrations are in Hardap (41.0%), ǁKaras (36.1%), Erongo (20.5%), Khomas (18.5%), Omaheke (10.0%), Otjozondjupa (9.4%), Kunene (4.2%), and Oshikoto (2.3%).

Some native speakers of Bantu languages and English also speak Afrikaans as a second language. It is widely taught in South African schools, with about 10.3 million second-language students.

Afrikaans is offered at many universities outside South Africa, including in Belgium, Germany, the Netherlands, Poland, Russia and the United States. In Australia, Lameroo Regional Community School (LRSC), located in the rural town of Lameroo in the Murray Mallee region of South Australia, has taught Afrikaans as a second language for primary school students since 2024, being the only school in the country to do so. The language is taught due to the town's growing South African community working in the agricultural sector.

== Dialects ==
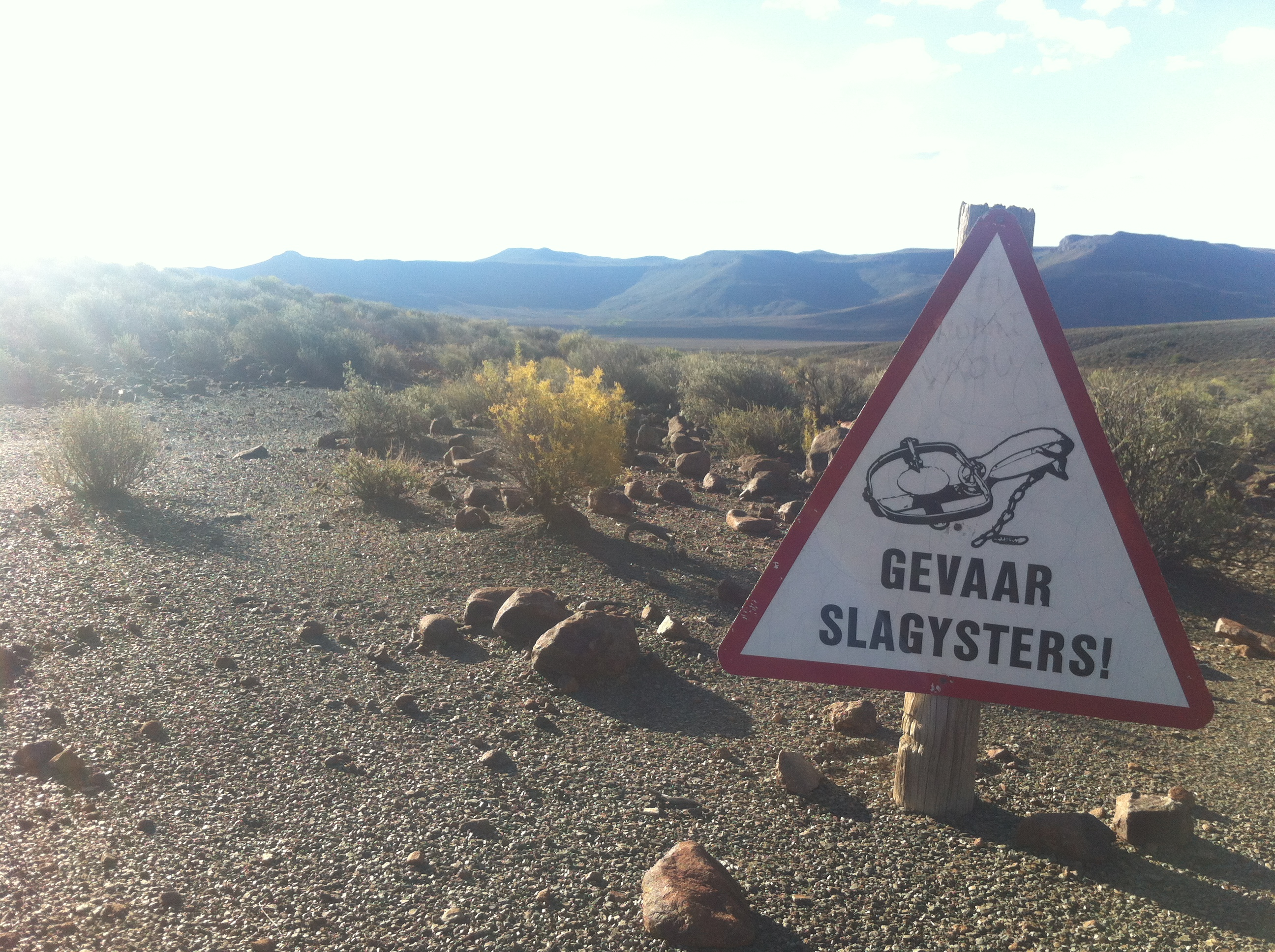
A warning sign in Afrikaans: Gevaar Slagysters!, "Danger, Traps!"

Following early dialectal studies of Afrikaans, it was theorised that three main historical dialects probably existed after the Great Trek in the 1830s. These dialects are the Northern Cape, Western Cape, and Eastern Cape dialects. (Note: They were named before the establishment of the current Western Cape, Eastern Cape, and Northern Cape provinces, and are not dialects of those provinces per se.) Northern Cape dialect may have resulted from contact between Dutch settlers and the Khoekhoe people between the Great Karoo and the Kunene, and Eastern Cape dialect between the Dutch and the Xhosa. Remnants of these dialects still remain in present-day Afrikaans, although the standardising effect of Standard Afrikaans has contributed to a great levelling of differences in modern times. Oranjerivier-Afrikaans (Orange River Afrikaans) is a major variety, including the Oranjerivier Afrikaans spoken by whites and Griqua Afrikaans spoken by Griqua as well as Namakwalands. There is also a prison cant, known as Sabela, which is based on Afrikaans, yet heavily influenced by Zulu. This language is used as a secret language in prison and is taught to initiates.

=== Patagonian Afrikaans ===
Patagonian Afrikaans is a distinct dialect of Afrikaans that is spoken by the 650-member South African community of Argentina, in the region of Patagonia.

=== Namibian Afrikaans ===
Namibian Afrikaans is a variety of Afrikaans spoken in Namibia. The country was governed by South Africa until 1990, which had favoured Afrikaans. Before that, Dutch had been introduced when the Dutch occupied Walvis Bay and the surrounding area.

== Phonology ==
A voice recording of Die Stem van Suid-Afrika ('The Voice of South Africa'), the former national anthem, read in poetic form

=== Vowels ===
Monophthong phonemes
	Front				Central				Back	
	unrounded		rounded		unrounded		rounded		Back	
	short	long	short	long	short	long	short	long	short	long
Close	i	(iː)	y	yː					u	(uː)
Mid	e	eː			ə	(əː)	œ	(œː)	o	(oː)
Near-open	(æ)	(æː)								
Open	a									ɑː

- As phonemes, /iː/ and /uː/ occur only in the words spieël /spiːl/ 'mirror' and koeël /kuːl/ 'bullet', which used to be pronounced with sequences /i.ə/ and /u.ə/, respectively. In other cases, [iː] and [uː] occur as allophones of, respectively, /i/ and /u/ before /r/.
- /y/ is phonetically long [yː] before /r/.
- /əː/ is always stressed and occurs only in the word wîe 'wedges'.
- The closest unrounded counterparts of /œ, œː/ are central /ə, əː/, rather than front /e, eː/.
- /œː, oː/ occur only in a few words.
- [æ] occurs as an allophone of /e/ before /k, χ, l, r/, though this occurs primarily dialectally, most commonly in the former Transvaal and Free State provinces.

==== Diphthongs ====
Diphthong phonemes
Starting point		Ending point		
Starting point		Front	Central	Back
Mid	unrounded	ɪø, əɪ	ɪə	
Mid	rounded	œɪ, ɔɪ	ʊə	œʊ
Open	unrounded	aɪ, ɑːɪ		

- /ɔi, ai/ occur mainly in loanwords.

=== Consonants ===
Consonant phonemes
		Labial	Alveolar	Post- alveolar	Dorsal	Glottal
Nasal		m	n		ŋ	
Plosive	voiceless	p	t	t͡ʃ	k	
Plosive	voiced	b	d	(d͡ʒ)	(ɡ)	
Fricative	voiceless	f	s	ʃ (ɹ̠̊˔)	χ	
Fricative	voiced	v	(z)	ʒ		ɦ
Approximant		v	l		j	
Rhotic			r ~ ɾ ~ ʀ ~ ʁ			

- All obstruents at the ends of words are devoiced, so that e.g. a final /d/ is realized as [t].
- /ɡ, dʒ, z/ occur only in loanwords. [ɡ] is also an allophone of /χ/ in some environments.
- /χ/ is most often uvular [χ ~ ʀ̥]. Velar [x] occurs only in some speakers.
- The rhotic is usually an alveolar trill [r] or tap [ɾ]. In some parts of the former Cape Province, it is realized uvularly, either as a trill [ʀ] or a fricative [ʁ].

== Orthography ==
The Afrikaans writing system is based on Dutch, using the 26 letters of the ISO basic Latin alphabet, plus 16 additional vowel sounds represented by adding diacritics. The hyphen (e.g. in a compound like see-eend 'sea duck'), apostrophe (e.g. ma's 'mothers'), and a whitespace character (e.g. in multi-word units like Dooie See 'Dead Sea') is part of the orthography of words, while the indefinite article ŉ is a ligature. All the alphabet letters, including those with diacritics, have capital letters as allographs; the ŉ does not have a capital letter allograph. This means that Afrikaans has 88 graphemes with allographs in total.

Majuscule forms (also called uppercase or capital letters)
A	Á	Ä	B	C	D	E	É	È	Ê	Ë	F	G	H	I	Í	Î	Ï	J	K	L	M	N		O	Ó	Ô	Ö	P	Q	R	S	T	U	Ú	Û	Ü	V	W	X	Y	Ý	Z
Minuscule forms (also called lowercase or small letters)
a	á	ä	b	c	d	e	é	è	ê	ë	f	g	h	i	í	î	ï	j	k	l	m	n	ŉ	o	ó	ô	ö	p	q	r	s	t	u	ú	û	ü	v	w	x	y	ý	z

In Afrikaans, many consonants are dropped from the earlier Dutch spelling. For example, slechts ('only') in Dutch becomes slegs in Afrikaans. Also, Afrikaans and some Dutch dialects make no distinction between /s/ and /z/, having merged the latter into the former; while the word for "south" is written zuid in Dutch, it is spelled suid in Afrikaans (as well as dialectal Dutch writings) to represent this merger. Similarly, the Dutch digraph ĳ, normally pronounced as /ɛi/, corresponds to Afrikaans y, except where it replaces the Dutch suffix –lijk which is pronounced as /lək/, as in waarschijnlijk > waarskynlik.

Another difference is the indefinite article, 'n in Afrikaans and een in Dutch. "A book" is 'n boek in Afrikaans, whereas it is either een boek or 'n boek in Dutch. This 'n is usually pronounced as just a weak vowel, [ə], just like English "a".

The diminutive suffix in Afrikaans is -tjie, -djie or -ie, whereas in Dutch it is -tje or dje, hence a "bit" is ŉ bietjie in Afrikaans and beetje in Dutch.

The letters c, q, x, and z occur almost exclusively in borrowings from French, English, Greek and Latin. This is usually because words that had c and ch in the original Dutch are spelled with k and g, respectively, in Afrikaans. Similarly original qu and x are most often spelt kw and ks, respectively. For example, ekwatoriaal instead of equatoriaal, and ekskuus instead of excuus.

The vowels with diacritics in non-loanword Afrikaans are: á, ä, é, è, ê, ë, í, î, ï, ó, ô, ö, ú, û, ü, ý. Diacritics are ignored when alphabetising, but it is important to include them even if they are difficult to type. For example, geëet ("ate") instead of the 3 e's alongside each other: *geeet, which can never occur in Afrikaans, or sê, which translates to "say", whereas se is a possessive form. The primary function of the acute accent (á, é, í, ó, ú, ý) is to indicate an emphasised syllable. For example, sál ("will" (verb)), néé ('no'), móét ("must"), hý ("he"), gewéét ("knew"). The acute is only placed on an i if that is the only vowel in an emphasised word: wil ('want' (verb)) becomes wíl, but lui ('lazy') becomes lúi. Only a few non-loan words are spelled with acutes, e.g. dié ('this'), ná ('after'), óf ... óf ('either ... or'), nóg ... nóg ('neither ... nor'), etc. Only four non-loan words are spelled with the grave accent: nè ('yes?', 'right?', 'eh?'), dè ('here, take this!' or '[this is] yours!'), hè ('huh?', 'what?', 'eh?'), and appèl ('(formal) appeal' (noun)).

=== Initial apostrophes ===
A few short words in Afrikaans take initial apostrophes. In modern Afrikaans, these words are always written in lower case (except when writing in all-capitals); if they occur at the beginning of a sentence, the following word that has no initial apostrophe is capitalised instead. Three examples of such apostrophed words are 'k, 't, 'n. The last (the indefinite article) is the only such word common in modern written Afrikaans, since the others are shortened versions of words that are usually written out (ek and het, respectively) and are rarely found outside of a poetic context.

Here are a few examples:

Apostrophed version	Usual version	Translation	Notes
'k 't Dit gesê or Ek't dit gesê	Ek het dit gesê	I said it	Version with two apostrophes is uncommon
't Jy dit geëet?	Het jy dit geëet?	Did you eat it?	Extremely uncommon
'n Man loop daar		A man walks there	Standard Afrikaans pronounces 'n as a schwa vowel.

The apostrophe and the following letter are regarded as two separate characters, and are never written using a single glyph, although a single-character variant of the indefinite article appears in Unicode, ŉ.

=== Table of characters ===
For more on the pronunciation of the letters below, see Help:IPA/Afrikaans.

Afrikaans letters and pronunciation
Grapheme	IPA	Examples and Notes
a	/a/, /ɑː/	appel ('apple'; /a/), tale ('languages'; /ɑː/). Represents /a/ in closed syllables and /ɑː/ in stressed open syllables
á	/a/, /ɑː/	ná (after)
ä	/a/, /ɑː/	sebraägtig ('zebra-like'). The diaeresis indicates the start of new syllable.
aa	/ɑː/	aap ('monkey', 'ape'). Only occurs in closed syllables.
aai	/ɑːi/	draai ('turn')
ae	/ɑːə/	vrae ('questions'); the vowels belong to two separate syllables
ai	/ai/	baie ('many', 'much' or 'very'), ai (expression of frustration or resignation)
b	/b/, /p/	boom ('tree')
c	/s/, /k/	Found only in borrowed words or proper nouns; the former pronunciation occurs before 'e', 'i', or 'y'; featured in the Latinate plural ending -ici (singular form -ikus)
ch	/ʃ/, /x/, /k/	chirurg ('surgeon'; /ʃ/; typically sj is used instead), chemie ('chemistry'; /x/), chitien ('chitin'; /k/). Found only in recent loanwords and in proper nouns
d	/d/, /t/	dag ('day'), deel ('part', 'divide', 'share')
dj	/d͡ʒ/, /k/	djati ('teak'), broodjie ('sandwich'). Used to transcribe foreign words for the former pronunciation, and in the diminutive suffix -djie for the latter in words ending with d
e	/e(ː)/, /æ(ː)/, /ɪə/, /ɪ/, /ə/	bed (/e/), mens ('person', /eː/) (lengthened before /n/) ete ('meal', /ɪə/ and /ə/ respectively), berg ('mountain', /æ/), sker ('scissors', /æː/). /ɪ/ is the unstressed allophone of /ɪə/
é	/e(ː)/, /æ(ː)/, /ɪə/	dié ('this'), mét ('with', emphasised), ék ('I; me', emphasised), wéét ('know', emphasised)
è	/e/	Found in loanwords (like crèche) and proper nouns (like Eugène) where the spelling was maintained, and in four non-loanwords: nè ('yes?', 'right?', 'eh?'), dè ('here, take this!' or '[this is] yours!'), hè ('huh?', 'what?', 'eh?'), and appèl ('(formal) appeal' (noun)).
ê	/eː/, /æː/	sê ('to say'), wêreld ('world'), lêer ('file') (Allophonically /æː/ before /(ə)r/)
ë	–	This diaeresis only indicates the start of a new syllable, thus ë, ëe and ëi are pronounced the same as 'e', 'ee' and 'ei', respectively
ee	/ɪə/	weet ('to know'), een ('one')
eeu	/ɪu/	leeu ('lion'), eeu ('century', 'age')
ei	/ei/	lei ('to lead')
eu	/ɪɵ/	seun ('son' or 'lad')
f	/f/	fiets ('bicycle')
g	/x/, /ɡ/	/ɡ/ exists as the allophone of /x/ if at the end of a root word preceded by a stressed single vowel + /r/ and suffixed with a schwa, e.g. berg ('mountain') is pronounced as /bæːrx/, and berge is pronounced as /bæːrɡə/
gh	/ɡ/	gholf ('golf'). Used for /ɡ/ when it is not an allophone of /x/; found only in borrowed words. If the h instead begins the next syllable, the two letters are pronounced separately.
h	/ɦ/	hael ('hail'), hond ('dog')
i	/i/, /ə/	kind ('child'; /ə/), ink ('ink'; /ə/), krisis ('crisis'; /i/ and /ə/ respectively), elektrisiteit ('electricity'; /i/ for all three; third 'i' is part of diphthong 'ei')
í	/i/, /ə/	krísis ('crisis', emphasised), dít ('that', emphasised)
î	/əː/	wîe (plural of wig; 'wedges' or 'quoins')
ï	/i/, /ə/	Found in words such as beïnvloed ('to influence'). The diaeresis indicates the start of a new syllable.
ie	/i(ː)/	iets ('something'), vier ('four')
j	/j/	julle (plural 'you')
k	/k/	kat ('cat'), kan ('can' (verb) or 'jug')
l	/l/	lag ('laugh')
m	/m/	man ('man')
n	/n/	nael ('nail')
ŉ	/ə/	indefinite article ŉ ('a'), styled as a ligature (Unicode character U+0149)
ng	/ŋ/	sing ('to sing')
o	/o/, /ʊə/, /ʊ/	op ('up(on)'; /o/), grote ('size'; /ʊə/), polisie ('police'; /ʊ/)
ó	/o/, /ʊə/	óp ('done, finished', emphasised), gróót ('huge', emphasised)
ô	/oː/	môre ('tomorrow')
ö	/o/, /ʊə/	Found in words such as koöperasie ('co-operation'). The diaeresis indicates the start of new syllable, thus ö is pronounced the same as 'o' based on the following remainder of the word.
oe	/u(ː)/	boek ('book'), koers ('course', 'direction')
oei	/ui/	koei ('cow')
oo	/ʊə/	oom ('uncle' or 'sir')
ooi	/oːi/	mooi ('pretty', 'beautiful'), nooi ('invite')
ou	/ɵu/	die ou ('the guy'), die ou skoen ('the old shoe'). Sometimes spelled ouw in loanwords and surnames, for example Louw.
p	/p/	pot ('pot'), pers ('purple' — or 'press' indicating the news media; the latter is often spelled with an <ê>)
q	/k/	Found only in foreign words with original spelling maintained; typically k is used instead
r	/r/	rooi ('red')
s	/s/, /z/, /ʃ/, /ʒ/	ses ('six'), stem ('voice' or 'vote'), posisie ('position', /z/ for first 's', /s/ for second 's'), rasioneel ('rational', /ʃ/ (nonstandard; formally /s/ is used instead) visuëel ('visual', /ʒ/ (nonstandard; /z/ is more formal)
sj	/ʃ/	sjaal ('shawl'), sjokolade ('chocolate')
t	/t/	tafel ('table')
tj	/tʃ/, /k/	tjank ('whine like a dog' or 'to cry incessantly'). The latter pronunciation occurs in the common diminutive suffix "-(e)tjie"
u	/ɵ/, /y(ː)/	stuk ('piece'), unie ('union')
ú	/œ/, /y(ː)/	búk ('bend over', emphasised), ú ('you', formal, emphasised)
û	/ɵː/	brûe ('bridges')
ü	–	Indicates the start of a new syllable in words such as reünie ('reunion'), where it is pronounced the same as u. In German words, including surnames such as Müller, it is pronounced as in German.
ui	/ɵi/	uit ('out')
uu	/y(ː)/	uur ('hour')
v	/f/, /v/	vis ('fish'), visuëel ('visual')
w	/v/, /w/	water ('water'; /v/); allophonically /w/ after obstruents within a root; an example: kwas ('brush'; /w/)
x	/z/, /ks/	xifoïed ('xiphoid'; /z/), x-straal ('x-ray'; /ks/).
y	/əi/	byt ('bite')
ý	/əi/	hý ('he', emphasised)
z	/z/	Zoeloe ('Zulu'). Found only in onomatopoeia and loanwords

== Grammar ==
In Afrikaans grammar, there is no distinction between the infinitive and present forms of verbs, with the exception of the verbs 'to be' and 'to have'.

infinitive form	present indicative form	Dutch	English
wees	is	zijn or wezen	be
hê	het	hebben	have

In addition, verbs do not conjugate differently depending on the subject. For example,

Afrikaans	Dutch	English
ek is	ik ben	I am
jy/u is	jij/u bent	you are (sing.)
hy/sy/dit is	hij/zij/het is	he/she/it is
ons is	wij zijn	we are
julle is	jullie zijn	you are (plur.)
hulle is	zij zijn	they are

Only a handful of Afrikaans verbs have a preterite, namely the auxiliary wees ('to be'), the modal verbs, and the verb dink ('to think'). The preterite of mag ('may') is rare in contemporary Afrikaans.

Afrikaans		Dutch		English	
present	past	present	past	present	past
ek is	ek was	ik ben	ik was	I am	I was
ek kan	ek kon	ik kan	ik kon	I can	I could
ek moet	ek moes	ik moet	ik moest	I must	(I had to)
ek wil	ek wou	ik wil	ik wilde/wou	I want to	I wanted to
ek sal	ek sou	ik zal	ik zou	I shall	I should
ek mag	(ek mog)	ik mag	ik mocht	I may	I might
ek dink	ek dog	ik denk	ik dacht	I think	I thought

All other verbs use the perfect tense, het + past participle (ge-), for the past. Therefore, there is no distinction in Afrikaans between I drank and I have drunk. (In colloquial German, the past tense is also often replaced with the perfect.)

Afrikaans	Dutch	English
ek het gedrink	ik dronk	I drank
ek het gedrink	ik heb gedronken	I have drunk

When telling a longer story, Afrikaans speakers usually avoid the perfect and simply use the present tense, or historical present tense instead (as is possible, but less common, in English as well).

A particular feature of Afrikaans is its use of the double negative; it is classified in Afrikaans as ontkennende vorm and is something that is absent from the other West Germanic standard languages. For example:

Afrikaans: Hy kan nie Afrikaans praat nie, lit. 'He can not Afrikaans speak not'
Dutch: Hij spreekt geen Afrikaans.
English: He cannot speak Afrikaans. / He can't speak Afrikaans.

Both French and San origins have been suggested for double negation in Afrikaans. While double negation is still found in Low Franconian dialects in West Flanders and in some "isolated" villages in the centre of the Netherlands (such as Garderen), it takes a different form, which is not found in Afrikaans. The following is an example:

Afrikaans: Ek wil nie dit doen nie.^{*} (lit. I want not this do not.)
Dutch: Ik wil dit niet doen.
English: I do not want to do this.

^{*} Compare with Ek wil dit nie doen nie, which changes the meaning to 'I want not to do this'. Whereas Ek wil nie dit doen nie emphasizes a lack of desire to act, Ek wil dit nie doen nie emphasizes the act itself.

The -ne was the Middle Dutch way to negate but it has been suggested that since -ne became highly non-voiced, nie or niet was needed to complement the -ne. With time the -ne disappeared in most Dutch dialects.

The double negative construction has been fully grammaticalised in standard Afrikaans and its proper use follows a set of fairly complex rules as the examples below show:

Afrikaans	Dutch (literally translated)	More correct Dutch	Literal English	Idiomatic English
Ek het (nie) geweet dat hy (nie) sou kom (nie).	Ik heb (niet) geweten dat hij (niet) zou komen.	Ik wist (niet) dat hij (niet) zou komen.	I did (not) know that he would (not) come.	I did (not) know that he was (not) going to come.
Hy sal nie kom nie, want hy is siek. (Note: kan would be best used in this case because kan nie means cannot and since he is sick he is unable to come, whereas sal is 'will' in English and is thus not the best word choice.)	Hij zal niet komen, want hij is ziek.	Hij komt niet, want hij is ziek.	He will not come, as he is sick.	He is sick and is not going to come.
Dis (Dit is) nie so moeilik om Afrikaans te leer nie.	Het is niet zo moeilijk (om) Afrikaans te leren.		It is not so difficult to learn Afrikaans.	

A notable exception to this is the use of the negating grammar form that coincides with negating the English present participle. In this case there is only a single negation.

Afrikaans: Hy is in die hospitaal, maar hy eet nie.
Dutch: Hij is in het ziekenhuis, maar hij eet niet.
English: He is in [the] hospital, though he doesn't eat.

Certain words in Afrikaans would be contracted. For example, moet nie, which literally means 'must not', usually becomes moenie; although one does not have to write or say it like this, virtually all Afrikaans speakers will change the two words to moenie in the same way as do not is contracted to don't in English.

The Dutch word het ('it' in English) does not correspond to het in Afrikaans. The Dutch words corresponding to Afrikaans het are heb, hebt, heeft and hebben.

Afrikaans	Dutch	English
het	heb, hebt, heeft, hebben	have, has
die	de, het	the
dit	het	it

== Influences on Afrikaans from other languages ==
=== Malay ===
Due to the early settlement of a Cape Malay community in Cape Town, who are now known as Coloureds, numerous Classical Malay words were brought into Afrikaans. Some of these words entered Dutch via people arriving from what is now known as Indonesia as part of their colonial heritage. Malay words in Afrikaans include:

- baie, which means 'very'/'much'/'many' (from banyak) is a very commonly used Afrikaans word, different from its Dutch equivalent veel or erg.
- baadjie, Afrikaans for jacket (from baju, ultimately from Persian), used where Dutch would use jas or vest. The word baadje in Dutch is now considered archaic and only used in written, literary texts.
- bobotie, a traditional Cape-Malay dish, made from spiced minced meat baked with an egg-based topping.
- piesang, which means banana. This is different from the common Dutch word banaan. The Indonesian word pisang is also used in Dutch, though usage is less common.
- piering, which means saucer (from piring, also from Persian).
- sosatie, a dish similar to shish kebab.

=== Portuguese ===
Some words originally came from Portuguese such as sambreel ('umbrella') from the Portuguese sombreiro, kraal ('pen/cattle enclosure') from the Portuguese curral and mielie ('corn', from milho). Some of these words also exist in Dutch, like sambreel 'parasol', though usage is less common and meanings can slightly differ.

=== Khoisan languages ===
- dagga, meaning cannabis
- geitjie, meaning lizard, diminutive adapted from a Khoekhoe word
- gogga, meaning insect, from the Khoisan xo-xo
- karos, blanket of animal hides
- kierie, walking stick from Khoekhoe

Some of these words also exist in Dutch, though with a more specific meaning: assegaai for example means 'South-African tribal javelin' and karos means 'South-African tribal blanket of animal hides'.

=== Bantu languages ===
Loanwords from Bantu languages in Afrikaans include the names of indigenous birds, such as mahem and sakaboela, and indigenous plants, such as maroela and tamboekie(gras).

- fundi, from the Zulu word umfundi meaning 'scholar' or 'student"', but used to mean someone who is a student of/expert on a certain subject, i.e. He is a language fundi.
- lobola, meaning bride price, from (and referring to) lobolo of the Nguni languages
- mahem, the grey crowned crane, known in Latin as Balearica regulorum
- maroela, medium-sized dioecious tree known in Latin as Sclerocarya birrea
- tamboekiegras, species of thatching grass known as Hyparrhenia
- tambotie, deciduous tree also known by its Latin name, Spirostachys africana
- tjaila / tjailatyd, an adaption of the word chaile, meaning "to go home" or "to knock off (from work)".

=== French ===
The revoking of the Edict of Nantes on 22 October 1685 was a milestone in the history of South Africa, for it marked the beginning of the great Huguenot exodus from France. It is estimated that between 250,000 and 300,000 Protestants left France between 1685 and 1700; out of these, according to Louvois, 100,000 had received military training. A measure of the calibre of these immigrants and of their acceptance by host countries (in particular South Africa) is given by H. V. Morton in his book: In Search of South Africa (London, 1948). The Huguenots were responsible for a great linguistic contribution to Afrikaans, particularly in terms of military terminology as many of them fought on the battlefields during the wars of the Great Trek.

Most of the words in this list are descendants from Dutch borrowings from French, Old French or Latin, and are not direct influences from French on Afrikaans.

Afrikaans	Indonesian	Dutch	French	English
advies	advis	advies	avis	advice
alarm	alarm	alarm	alarme	alarm
ammunisie	amunisi	ammunitie, munitie	munition	ammunition
amusant		amusant	amusant	funny
artillerie	artileri	artillerie	artillerie	artillery
ateljee	atelir	atelier	atelier	studio
bagasie	bagasi	bagage	bagage	luggage
bastion	bastion	bastion	bastion	bastion
bataljon	batalion	bataljon	bataillon	battalion
battery	bateri	batterij	batterie	battery
biblioteek	bibliotek	bibliotheek	bibliothèque	library
faktuur	faktur	factuur	facture	invoice
fort		fort	fort	fort
frikkadel	perkedel	frikandel	fricadelle	meatball
garnisoen	garnisun	garnizoen	garnison	garrison
generaal	jenderal	generaal	général	general
granaat	granat	granaat	grenade	grenade
infanterie	infantri	infanterie	infanterie	infantry
interessant		interessant	intéressant	interesting
kaliber	kaliber	kaliber	calibre	calibre
kanon	kanon	kanon	canon	cannon
kanonnier	kanonir	kanonnier	canonier	gunner
kardoes	kardus	kardoes, cartouche	cartouche	cartridge
kaptein	kapten	kapitein	capitaine	captain
kolonel	kolonel	kolonel	colonel	colonel
kommandeur	komendur	commandeur	commandeur	commander
kwartier	kwartir	kwartier	quartier	quarter
luitenant	letnan	lieutenant	lieutenant	lieutenant
magasyn	magasin	magazijn	magasin	magazine
manier		manier	manière	way
marsjeer		marcheer, marcheren	marcher	(to) march
meubels	mebel	meubels	meubles	furniture
militêr	militer	militair	militaire	militarily
morsel		morzel	morceau	piece
mortier	mortir	mortier	mortier	mortar
muit		muit, muiten	mutiner	(to) mutiny
musket	musket	musket	mousquet	musket
muur		muur	mur	wall
myn		mijn	mine	mine
offisier	opsir	officier	officier	officer
orde	orde	orde	ordre	order
papier		papier	papier	paper
pionier	pionir	pionier	pionnier	pioneer
plafon	plafon	plafond	plafond	ceiling
plat	plat	plat	plat	flat
pont		pont	pont	ferry
provoos	provos	provoost	prévôt	chief
rondte	ronde	rondte, ronde	ronde	round
salvo	salvo	salvo	salve	salvo
soldaat		soldaat	soldat	soldier
tante	tante	tante	tante	aunt
tapyt		tapijt	tapis	carpet
tros		tros	trousse	bunch

== Sample text ==
Afrikaans pronunciation

Article 1 of the Universal Declaration of Human Rights:

Alle menslike wesens word vry, met gelyke waardigheid en regte, gebore. Hulle het rede en gewete en behoort in die gees van broederskap teenoor mekaar op te tree.

Psalm 23 1953 translation:

Die Here is my Herder, niks sal my ontbreek nie.
Hy laat my neerlê in groen weivelde; na waters waar rus is, lei Hy my heen.
Hy verkwik my siel; Hy lei my in die spore van geregtigheid, om sy Naam ontwil.
Al gaan ek ook in 'n dal van doodskaduwee, ek sal geen onheil vrees nie; want U is met my: u stok en u staf die vertroos my.

Psalm 23 1983 translation:

Die Here is my Herder, ek kom niks kort nie.
Hy laat my rus in groen weivelde. Hy bring my by waters waar daar vrede is.
Hy gee my nuwe krag. Hy lei my op die regte paaie tot eer van Sy naam.
Selfs al gaan ek deur donker dieptes, sal ek nie bang wees nie, want U is by my. In U hande is ek veilig.

Lord's Prayer (Afrikaans New Living Version translation):

Ons Vader in die hemel, laat u Naam geheilig word.
Laat u koninkryk kom.
Laat u wil hier op aarde uitgevoer word soos in die hemel.
Gee ons die porsie brood wat ons vir vandag nodig het.
En vergeef ons ons sondeskuld soos ons ook óns skuldenaars vergewe het.
Bewaar ons sodat ons nie aan verleiding sal toegee nie; maar bevry ons van die greep van die bose.
Want aan U behoort die koningskap,
en die krag,
en die heerlikheid,
vir altyd.
Amen.

Lord's Prayer (Original translation):

Onse Vader wat in die hemel is,
laat U Naam geheilig word;
laat U koninkryk kom;
laat U wil geskied op die aarde,
net soos in die hemel.
Gee ons vandag ons daaglikse brood;
en vergeef ons ons skulde
soos ons ons skuldenaars vergewe
en laat ons nie in die versoeking nie
maar verlos ons van die bose
Want aan U behoort die koninkryk
en die krag
en die heerlikheid
tot in ewigheid.
Amen

== See also ==
- Aardklop Arts Festival
- Afrikaans literature
- Afrikaans speaking population in South Africa
- Arabic Afrikaans
- Handwoordeboek van die Afrikaanse Taal (HAT) (Concise Afrikaans Dictionary)
- Woordeboek van die Afrikaanse Taal (WAT) (Comprehensive Afrikaans Dictionary)
- Differences between Afrikaans and Dutch
- IPA/Afrikaans
- Klein Karoo Nasionale Kunstefees (Arts Festival)
- Languages of South Africa
- Languages of Zimbabwe § Afrikaans
- List of Afrikaans language poets
- List of Afrikaans singers
- List of English words of Afrikaans origin
- South African Translators' Institute
- Tsotsitaal
