= Stellingwerff =

Stellingwerff is a surname. Notable people with the surname include:

- Hilary Stellingwerff (born 1981), Canadian track and field middle-distance runner
- Jacobus Stellingwerff (1667–1727), artist from the Northern Netherlands

== See also ==
- Stellingwerf
