= Afrikaans Language Monument =

Monument in Paarl, Western Cape, South Africa

- Afrikaanse Taalmonument
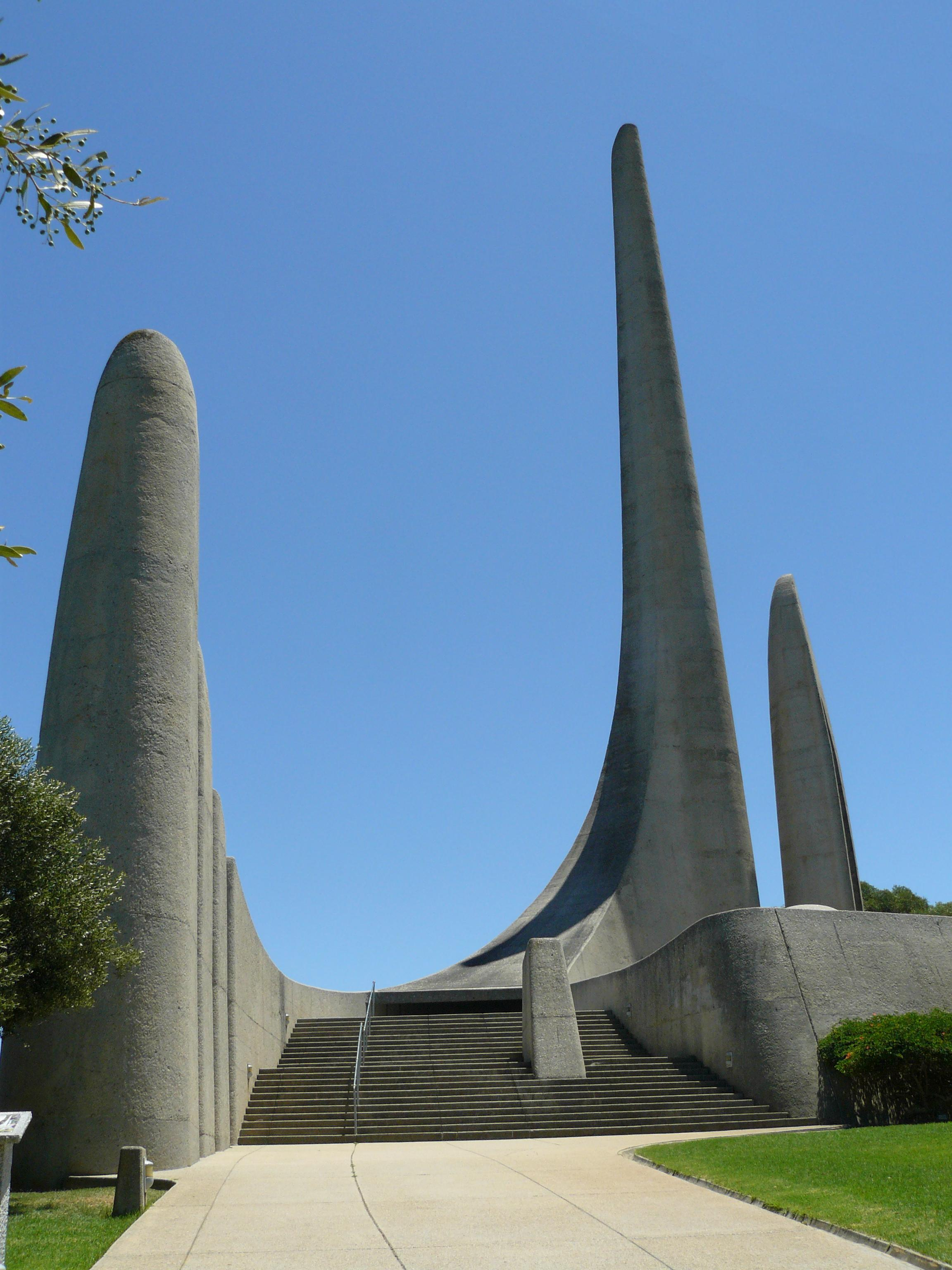
- Obelisks of the Language Monument
- Interactive map of Afrikaans Language Monument
- Location: Paarl, Western Cape, South Africa
- Coordinates: 33.76576°S 18.94257°E
- Designer: Jan Van Wijk
- Type: Monument
- Completion date: 1975
- Dedicated to: Afrikaans Language

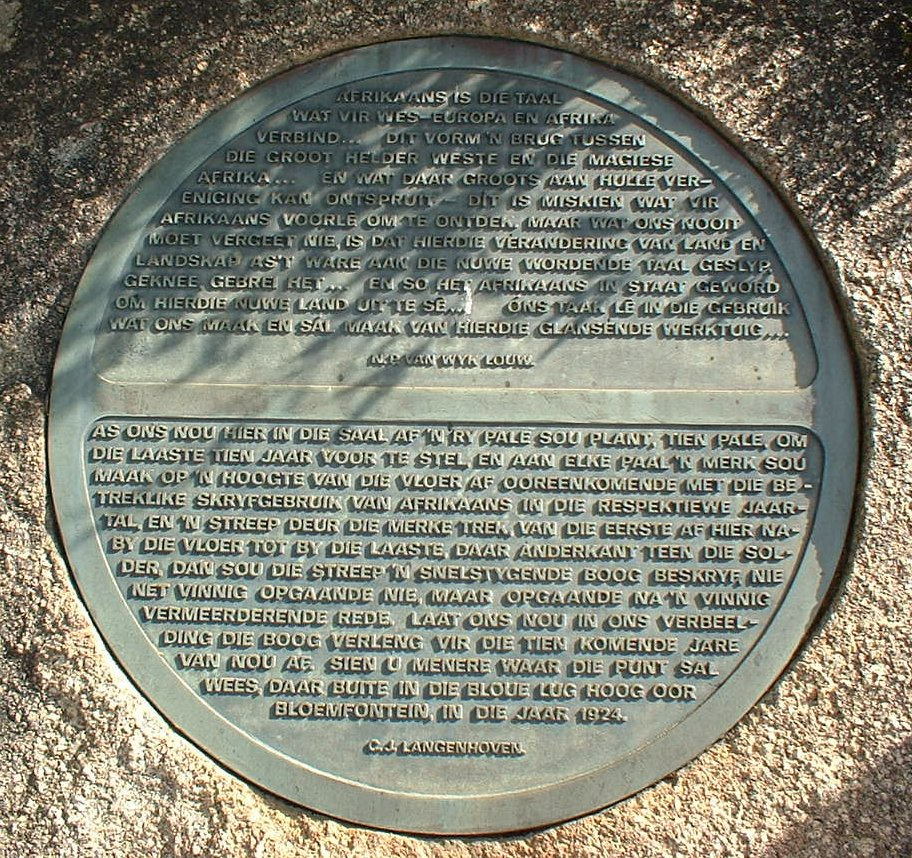
Plaque showing two quotations from poets writing in Afrikaans

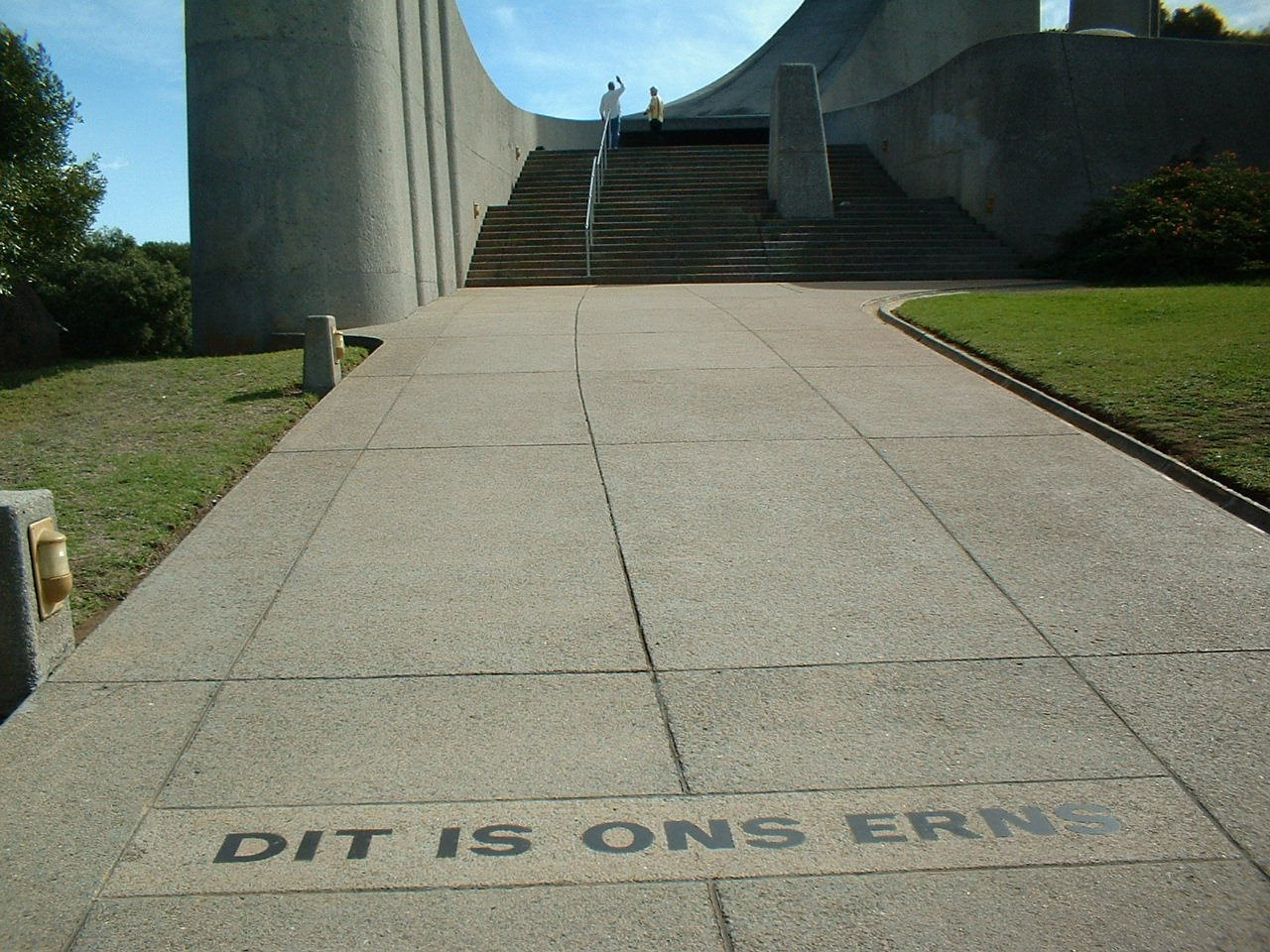
The path leading up to the monument.

The Afrikaans Language Monument (Afrikaans: Afrikaanse Taalmonument) is located on a hill overlooking Paarl, Western Cape Province, South Africa. Officially opened on 10 October 1975, it commemorates the semicentenary of Afrikaans being declared an official language of South Africa separate from Dutch. In addition, it was erected on the 100th anniversary of the founding of Genootskap van Regte Afrikaners (the Society of Real Afrikaners) in Paarl, the organisation that helped strengthen Afrikaners' identity and pride in their language.

== Structure ==
The monument consists of various tapering structures of a convex and concave nature, symbolising the influences of different languages and cultures on Afrikaans itself, as well as political developments in South Africa, as follows:

- Clear West – the European heritage of the language
- Magical Africa – the African influences on the language
- Bridge – between Europe and Africa
- Afrikaans – the language itself
- Republic – declared in 1961
- Malay language and culture

There is also an open stadium at the bottom of the structure where concerts and events are held.

== Plaque inscriptions ==
On a large plaque at the entrance are two quotations from prominent poets writing in Afrikaans:

- Afrikaans is die taal wat vir Wes-Europa en Afrika verbind... Dit vorm 'n brug tussen die groot helder Weste en die magiese Afrika... En wat daar groots aan hulle vereniging kan ontspruit – dit is miskien wat vir Afrikaans voorlê om te ontdek. Maar wat ons nooit moet vergeet nie, is dat hierdie verandering van land en landskap as't ware aan die nuwe wordende taal geslyp, geknee, gebrei het... En so het Afrikaans in staat geword om hierdie nuwe land uit te sê... Ons taak lê in die gebruik wat ons maak en sal maak van hierdie glansende werktuig... – N.P. van Wyk Louw
  "Afrikaans is the language that connects Western Europe and Africa... It forms a bridge between the large, shining West and the magical Africa... And what great things may come from their union – that is maybe what lies ahead for Afrikaans to discover. But what we must never forget, is that this change of country and landscape sharpened, kneaded and knitted this newly-becoming language... And so Afrikaans became able to speak out from this new land... Our task lies in the use that we make and will make of this gleaming vehicle..."
- As ons nou hier in die saal af 'n ry pale sou plant, tien pale, om die laaste tien jaar voor te stel, en aan elke paal 'n merk sou maak op 'n hoogte van die vloer af ooreenkomende met die betreklike skryfgebruik van Afrikaans in die respektiewe jaartal, en 'n streep deur die merke trek van die eerste af hier naby die vloer tot by die laaste daar anderkant teen die solder, dan sou die streep 'n snelstygende boog beskryf, nie net vinnig opgaande nie, maar opgaande na 'n vinnig vermeerderende rede. Laat ons nou in ons verbeelding die boog verleng vir die tien komende jare van nou af. Sien u menere waar die punt sal wees, daar buite in die bloue lug hoog oor Bloemfontein, in die jaar 1924. – C.J. Langenhoven
  "If we plant a row of poles down this hall now, ten poles, to represent the last ten years, and on each pole we make a mark at a height from the floor corresponding to the relative written use of Afrikaans in the respective year, and we draw a line, from the first here near the floor to the last over there against the loft, then the line would describe a rapidly rising arc, not only quickly rising, but rising in a quickly increasing manner. Let us now, in our imagination, extend the arc for the ten coming years from now. See you, sirs, where the point shall be, outside in the blue sky high over Bloemfontein, in the year 1924."

The phrase "DIT IS ONS ERNS" (roughly "we are earnest [about this]", or "this is our earnestness") is emblazoned on the pathway leading up to the monument.

== Burgersdorp monument ==
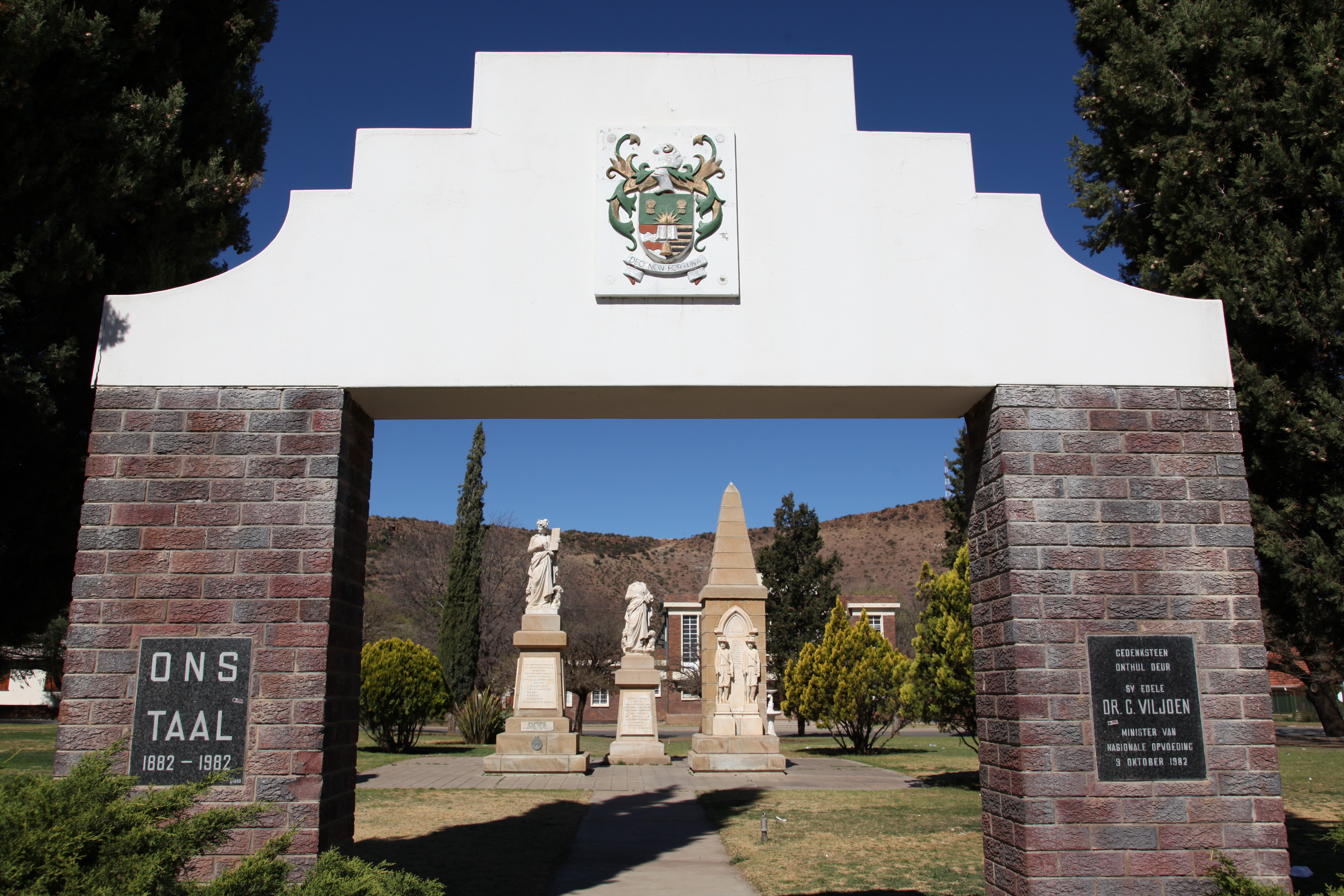
The Dutch Language Monument in Burgersdorp

The first monument to commemorate Afrikaans was the monument in Burgersdorp, which was built in 1893, although it refers to the Hollandse taal or the Dutch language. It depicts a woman pointing her finger at a book in her hands.

== Petrus Steyn Monument ==
Afrikaans Language Monument was created out of stones stacked by visitors at Petrus Steyn, Free State, on 14 August 1975, in celebration of the centenary of the Afrikaans Language.
