= Arnoldus Pannevis =

Dutch linguist

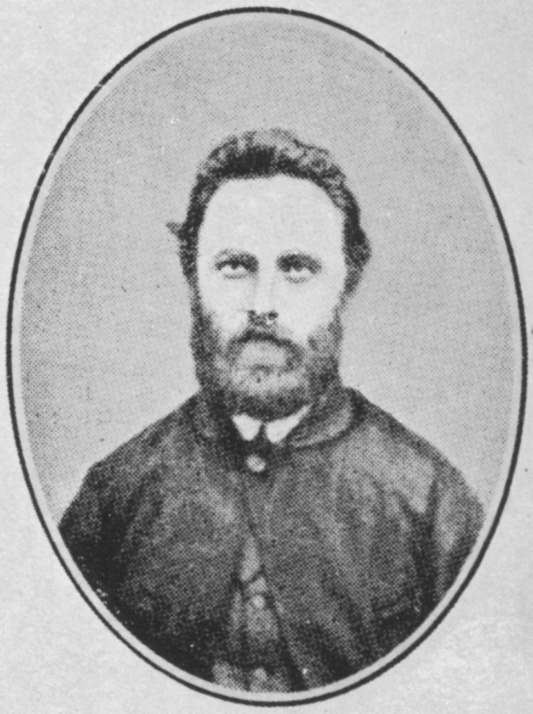
19th century photograph depicting Pannevis

Arnoldus Pannevis (16 February 1838 - 14 August 1884) was a Dutch minister and linguist who is known to have been a major proponent for the Afrikaans language and wrote numerous letters to translators asking for the creation of an edition of the Bible fully in Afrikaans throughout 1872 and later again in 1874.

Pannevis was born in the small village of Ouderkerk aan den IJssel in the mainland of the Netherlands in 1838 and first began a career in the Dutch navy but was honorably discharged two years later and soon gave the career up in favor of becoming a minister. In 1866 he started to take a particular interest with the Dutch established colonies in South Africa and finally set foot in Cape Town on the 11th of July 1866 on the premise of a Latin and Greek teacher position being offered to him at a gymnasium which was in the colonies. Whilst teaching at the gymnasium, he had a future linguist and translator, Stephanus Jacobus du Toit as a pupil and student. Pannevis gained traction when he published a letter in the popular Dutch newspaper De Zuid-Afrikaan. Pannevis's letter made a few other Afrikaans enthusiasts interested and in 1875, they created the Genootskap van Regte Afrikaners and in turn this started a movement to give more recognition to Afrikaans. Pannevis continued to make writings up until his death on the 14th of August 1884.

Other than his letters and promotion for Afrikaans, he wrote many pieces of poetry, with his most famous work being a rather short piece titled Groothyd. Pannevis was a polyglot and although he talked most in his native Dutch, spoke decently in German, French, Latin, Greek, and English Ironically, despite his fervent activism for the Afrikaans language, Pannevis rarely used the language himself and mostly wrote and spoke in Dutch although he began to have more active Afrikaans use during his later years.
