= Pieter Verhoef =

Pieter A. Verhoef
- Born: Pieter A. Verhoef; 1914; Hartbeesfontein
- Died: 18 January 2013 (aged 98–99)
- Education: PhD, Free University in Amsterdam
- Alma mater: Free University in Amsterdam
- Known for: Dean of the Faculty of Theology, Stellenbosch University.

Pieter Adriaan Verhoef (25 April 1914–18 January 2013) was a South African theologian and professor at Stellenbosch University. He was dean of Stellenbosch's Faculty of Theology from 1975–1979. Verhoef was part of the editorial board that made the 1983 translation of the Bible into Afrikaans by the South African Bible Society.

Verhoef earned a doctorate from the Free University in Amsterdam and an MA in Semitic Languages from Potchefstroom University. In 1988, he earned Honorary Doctorates from both Potchefstroom University (in addition to his MA) as well as the University of the Orange Free State.

== Bibliography ==
- The Books of Haggai and Malachi NICOT (Eerdmans, 1987) ISBN 978-0802825339
