= Boer Argentines =

Boere Argentyne (Afrikaans) Boer-argentinos (Spanish)
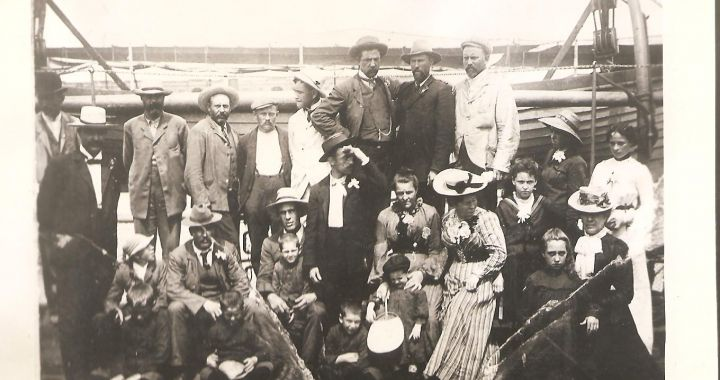
- Landing of Boer settlers in Argentina

Total population
- 1000 (by birth, 2022); 100,000 (by ancestry, 2024)

Regions with significant populations
- Mainly in Chubut and Río Negro

Languages
- Majority: Spanish (Rioplatense); Minority: Afrikaans (Patagonian)

Religion
- Majority: Protestantism; Minority: Catholicism · Irreligion

Related ethnic groups
- Other Afrikaners · other Boers; Afrikaner Canadians · Afrikaner Australians · Afrikaner Americans

South African Argentines, also known as Boer Argentines, are Argentine citizens of South African descent, primarily Afrikaners who emigrated to Argentina in the early 20th century following the Second Anglo-Boer War. This migration was motivated by a desire to preserve their cultural identity and avoid British rule.

By the time of their migration, slavery had long been abolished in both South Africa and Argentina, and the Boer settlers established predominantly European communities.

The settlement began on 4 June 1902, with Afrikaners primarily establishing themselves in the Chubut Province of southern Argentina, particularly in the town of Sarmiento. A smaller group settled in the Río Negro Province. These regions were selected due to agricultural opportunities and favourable conditions for establishing Afrikaner communities.

South African settlers were entirely of Boer origin. While the Afrikaans language persists within the community today, it is spoken by only around 300 individuals. Argentina was chosen as a destination due to the government's support for colonisation and opportunities for cultural and religious autonomy.

== History ==
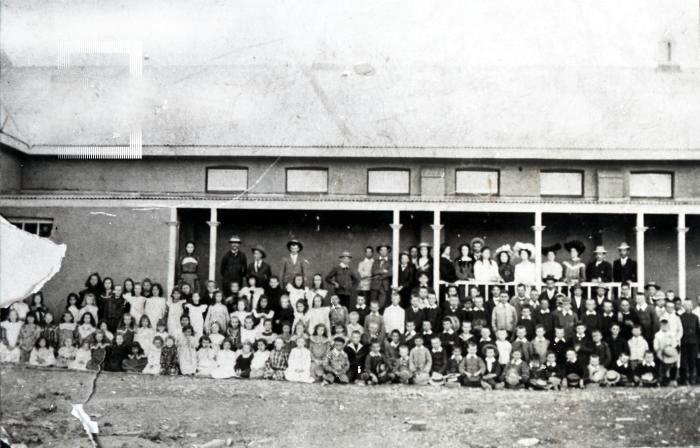
Afrikaner immigrants in Colonia Sarmiento.

Between 1902 and 1907/08 about 600 to 650 Boer settlers came to Argentina. These Boers were descendants of Dutch and French settlers of South Africa (also called Afrikaners). They came mostly from the Transvaal Province and Orange Free State. Most left South Africa following the Second Anglo-Boer War as many had lost their farms in the war or regarded themselves as Bittereinders who felt they could not live under a British government.

To migrate to the Argentine Patagonia region, the settlers sent two representatives to Comodoro Rivadavia (Louis Baumann and Camillo Ricchiardi), Chubut Province, to manage the establishment of the new colony. They were greeted by Francisco Pietrobelli, with whom toured the region, and called for the government land. They came on British cargo ships with bullock carts (ox wagons) and the national government provided them mules and tents. The distribution of land was authorized by then President Julio Argentino Roca and the Minister of Agriculture, Wenceslao Escalante, who was honoured with the name of the colony and, later, the department where it is located.

== See also ==
- Afrikaner
- Dutch Argentine
- Argentines of European descent
- Argentina–South Africa relations
