= Stellingwerf =

Stellingwerf is a Dutch surname. Notable people with the surname include:

- Auke Stellingwerf (1635–1665), Dutch admiral
- Dick Stellingwerf (born 1953), Dutch politician

== See also ==
- Stellingwarfs dialect
- Stellingwerff
