= Hollandic Dutch =

Dialect of Dutch

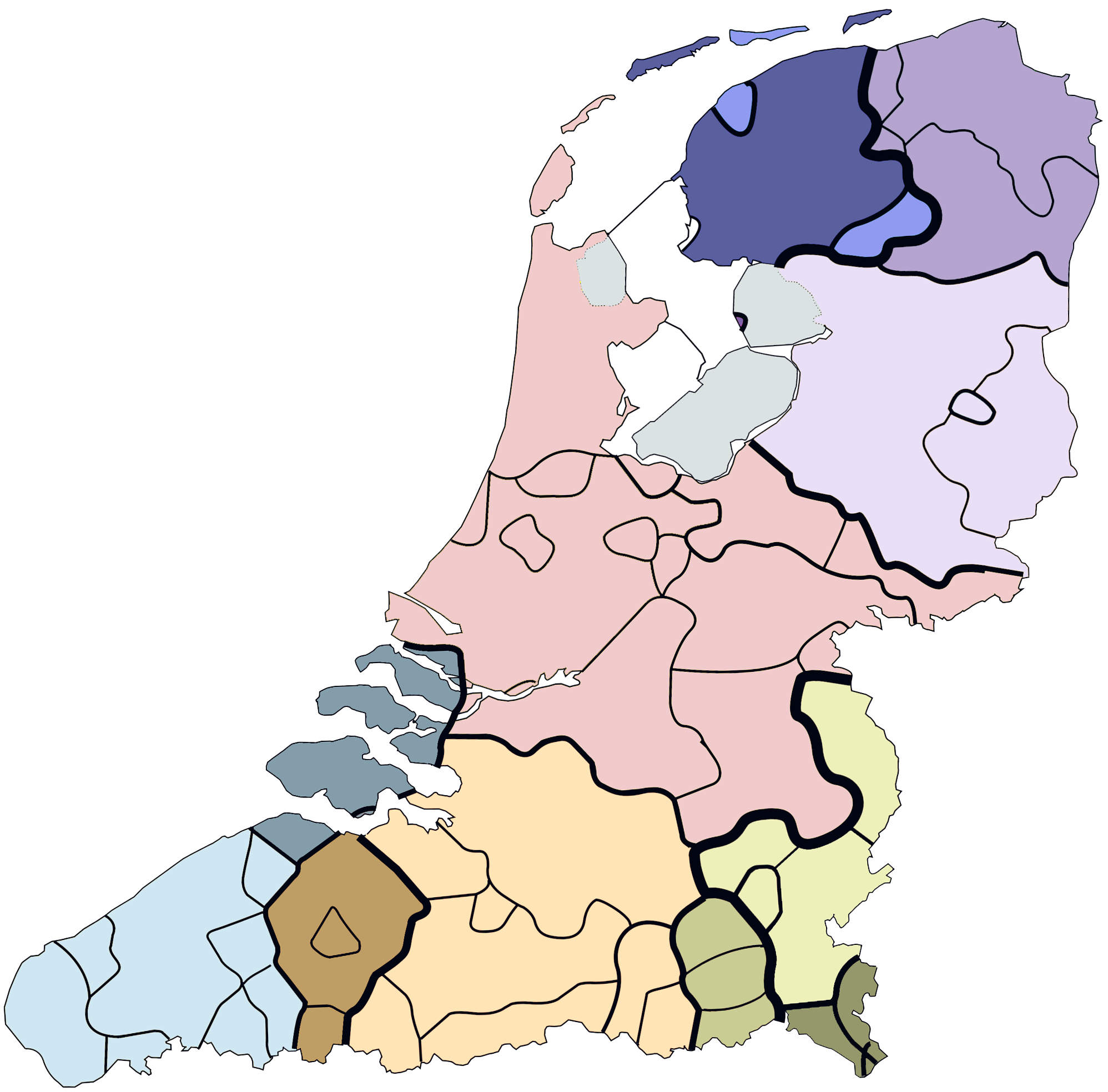
Hollandic (roughly the Western half of the pink area) within the Low Franconian-speaking area in Belgium, the Netherlands and France

Hollandic or Hollandish (Dutch: Hollands [ˈɦɔlɑnts]) is the most widely spoken dialect of the Dutch language. Hollandic is among the Central Dutch dialects. Other important language varieties of spoken Low Franconian languages are Brabantian, Flemish (East Flemish, West Flemish), Zeelandic, Limburgish, Surinamese Dutch and Afrikaans.

== History ==
Originally in the later County of Holland, Old Frisian or a related Ingvaeonic dialect was spoken. There is no evidence for the theory that migrating Low Franconian settlers were responsible for the change to Old Dutch in the 12th and 13th centuries. Instead, long-term language contact between Frisian speakers and Frankish speakers before the 12th century could have led to a Hollandic dialect that was partly Low Franconian and partly influenced by Frisian.

In the 16th century, Dutch was standardised, with the Brabantian dialect of Antwerp being the most influential one, according to many linguists.

During the Eighty Years' War, especially after 1585, the Sack of Antwerp and the 1580s successes of the Duke of Parma made between 100,000 and 200,000 of Brabantish and Flemish, mostly Calvinist, settle in the cities of Holland proper. The refugees caused a mixture of their dialects with those of the people who were already there. The new language replaced most of the original Hollandic dialects with Brabantian influences and further diluted the Frisian influences on Dutch.

That certainly slowed linguistic change by the influence on spoken language of the very conservative written standard. As a result, Standard Dutch has kept many features of late-16th-century Brabantian.

== Distance from standard language ==
The colloquial Dutch in Holland proper (the area of the old County of Holland), particularly the Hollandic now spoken in some urban areas, is closer to Standard Dutch than anywhere else.

== Shades of other dialects ==
In Friesland, Hollandic is spoken on Terschelling only. In the north of North Holland, especially in the region of West Friesland, and in parts of South Holland such as Scheveningen, Katwijk and other coastal places, the original West Frisian substratum of the Hollandic dialect is still an important part of the local West Frisian dialect group.

In Zaanstreek (central North Holland), a traditional region, the old Hollandic dialect, Zaans, is still found but with little West Frisian influence. Some words are similar because of the influence of migrating West Frisian farmers in the 13th to the 15th centuries. Zaans can be seen as one of the few (together with Westfries) and oldest original Hollandic dialects and is still spoken today, like the old Waterlands dialect, which exists as well in Volendam. Both Zaans and Waterlands are unintelligible for someone who does not come from that region in North Holland. However, people who speak Zaans, West Frisian or Waterlands are able to understand one another better than outsiders because all three dialects use similar words.

On the South Holland island of Goeree-Overflakkee, Zeelandic is spoken. In the east and south, the Hollandic dialects gradually become Brabantian respectively Kleverlandish. Utrechts-Alblasserwaards, spoken in the area immediately east of the coastal districts, is considered to be a subdialect of Hollandic or a separate dialect.

== List of subdialects ==
- Amsterdams
- Kennemerlands
- Huizers
- South Hollandic (Dutch: Zuid-Hollands; spoken in the southern part of the Hollandic-speaking area)
- Utrechts-Alblasserwaards
- Waterlands and Volendams
- West Frisian Dutch
- Westhoeks
- Westlands
- Zaans

== Related varieties ==
Bildts, Midslands, Stadsfries, and Amelands can be grouped with Frisian varieties of Friesland. The closest cluster to this cluster is that formed by Westerkwartier and Stellingwerf.

Hollandic, Zeelandic and West-Veluws can be grouped as Centraal westelijke dialecten. Among those, not only Hollandic borders to Centraal zuidelijke dialecten, which encompasses Brabantic and parts of Northern Dutch Limburg and Northern Belgium Limburg. The group, but not Hollandic, borders to non-Groningian Low Saxon and Flemish dialects. The dialect of Urk is closest to the group. The clusters grouping with the group including Hollandic are Zuidwest-Limburg and Centraal zuidelijke dialecten as well as Tienen.
