= Genootskap van Regte Afrikaners =

Society to promote the Afrikaans language

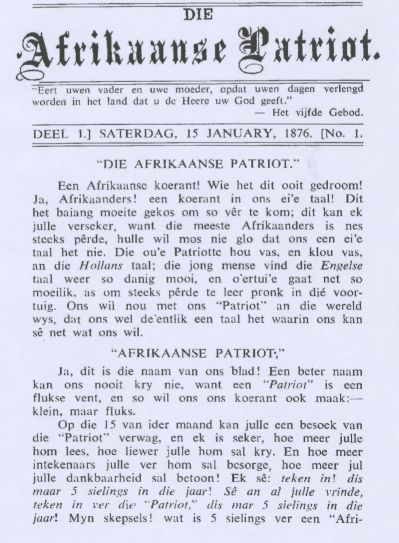
Front page of Die Afrikaanse Patriot, a journal published by the GRA.

The Genootskap van Regte Afrikaners (Afrikaans for "Society of True Afrikaners") was formed on 14 August 1875 in the town of Paarl by a group of Afrikaans speakers from the current Western Cape region. From 15 January 1876 the society published a journal in Afrikaans called Die Afrikaanse Patriot ("The Afrikaans Patriot") as well as a number of books, including grammars, dictionaries, religious material and histories. Die Afrikaanse Patriot was succeeded in 1905 by today's Paarl newspaper.

== History ==
Arnoldus Pannevis, a teacher, is generally considered to be the spiritual father of the society. He had observed that most of the South Africans from Dutch descent could not speak the "pure" form of their original mother tongue anymore. In the course of its (then) 200-year-old history, the language of the immigrants from the Netherlands had been thoroughly changed by the influence of other European immigrants, indigenous tribes such as the Khoikhoi, and especially the Cape Malays. In 1874 Pannevis expressed these views in the journal de Zuid-Afrikaan under the title "Is die Afferkaans wesenlijk een taal?" (Note: English translation: Is Afrikaans actually a language; modern Afrikaans translation: "Is Afrikaans eintlik 'n taal?")

On 14 August 1975 the Afrikaans Language Museum was opened in the former house of Gideon Malherbe in Paarl, the building in which the Society was founded. The Afrikaans Language Monument was also opened in Paarl in 1975, commemorating the 100th anniversary of the founding of the Society.

== Founders ==
The eight founding members were Gideon Malherbe, the Dutch immigrant CP Hoogenhout, DF du Toit^{AF} (nicknamed Dokter, i.e. "Doctor"), a journalist coincidentally named Daniel Francois du Toit^{AF} (nicknamed Oom Lokomotief, i.e. "Uncle Locomotive"), his brother Rev SJ du Toit, August Ahrbeck, Petrus Malherbe and SG du Toit. Everybody except Hoogenhout and Ahrbeck were related. Many of them were of Huguenot descent.
