= Central Dutch dialects =

Group of dialects

Central Dutch dialects (Dutch: Centraal Nederlands) are a group of dialects of the Dutch language from the Netherlands. They are spoken in Holland, Utrecht Province, south-western Gelderland, North Brabant and few parts of Limburg (Netherlands) and Friesland (Vlieland), and include Hollandic. It borders Low Saxon without Gronings, Limburgish, Brabantian and Zeelandic. Urkers, Frisian and Frisian mixed varieties are geographically close, too.

De analyse van taalvariatie in het Nederlandse dialectgebied has several classifications based on several characteristics: Considering distances in lexicon and pronunciation, it has some of the area of Central Dutch as Overijssel and vice versa, Centraal westelijke dialecten (Central Western dialects) and Central Dutch area is greatly contingent, Centraal zuidelijke dialecten (Central Southern dialects) is also greatly contingent with Central Dutch. Excluding one place in Holland, Central Dutch in the Netherlands can be grouped into a cluster in Central Gelderland and a one of other varieties. Both clusters border to Germany. Most varieties in Gelderland South of the aforementioned variety of Central Gelderland cluster together with the dialect of Amersfoort and several varieties in North Brabant. Boundaries have been drawn on the basis of old isoglosses.

Stadsfries is wrongly seen as Hollandic. Frisian mixed varieties has Stadsfries together with Amelands, Bildts and Midslands. These dialects have similarities with Frisian. The other dialects in this group in that study are Stellingwerfs. Stellingwerfs is not very close to them. The question cannot be answered whether Stellingwerfs varieties are more related to Frisian or to Low Saxon. Eupen dialect is similarly different from Luxembourgish as from Hollandic.

Wenker's original Rhenish fan outside the Netherlands largely has been reduced to regiolects and formal Luxembourgish. In both Germany and Belgium, dialect use has declined sharply since 1970. Young people only speak regiolect.
