= List of names on Mount Kenya =

Summit of Mount Kenya, with names of main glaciers, valleys and peaks

Mount Kenya (5,199 metres (17,057 ft)) is the second highest mountain in Africa and the highest mountain in Kenya, after which the country is named. It lies just south of the equator and currently has eleven small glaciers. Various expeditions reached it in the following years. It was first climbed in 1899 by Halford Mackinder. The mountain became a national park in 1949, played a key role in the Mau Mau events in the 1950s, and became a UNESCO World Heritage Site in 1997. It is climbed and walked up by up to 15,000 tourists every year.

== Mount Kenya ==
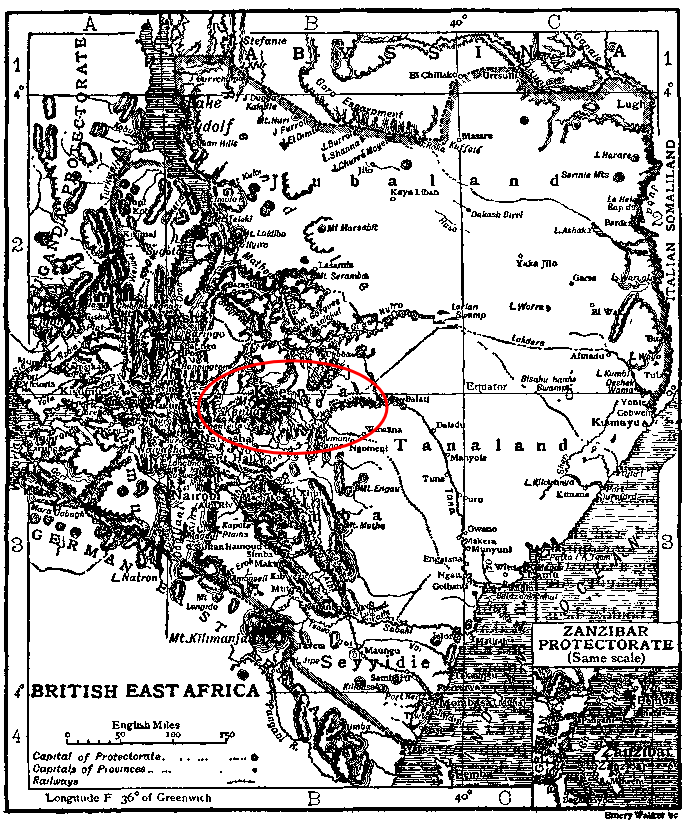
This 1911 map shows the region around Mount Kenya labelled as Kenya.

Mount Kenya serves as a historic ethnolinguistic crossroads, with its modern name deriving from the Akamba word Kĩĩ-Nyaa ("Mountain of the Ostrich"). In 1849, German missionaries Johann Ludwig Krapf and Johannes Rebmann recorded this name while being guided by Akamba traders, a designation that was later adopted for the Republic of Kenya. While linguistic variations among the Gĩkũyũ (Kĩrĩnyaga), Embu (Kinyaga) and Maasai (Ol Donyo Keri) all describe the mountain's "speckled" or "black and white" appearance, Nobel Laureate Wangari Maathai noted an alternative oral tradition suggesting the name arose from a linguistic misunderstanding regarding a guide's gourd. The region's history also includes the Ogiek (or Okiek), an ancient Southern Nilotic hunter-gatherer community and the earliest known inhabitants of the highland forests. Though they maintain a distinct indigenous identity and have secured legal recognition of their ancestral land rights, the Ogiek today are linguistically and administratively classified as a subgroup of the broader Kalenjin ethnic group. Krapf was staying in a Wakamba village when he first saw the mountain. Krapf, however, recorded the name as both Kenia and Kegnia. According to some sources, this is a corruption of the Wakamba Kiinyaa. Others however say that this was on the contrary a very precise notation of a native word pronounced ˈkenia. Nevertheless, the name was usually pronounced /ˈkiːnjə/ in English.

At the time, this referred to the mountain without having to include mountain in the name. The current name Mount Kenya was used by some as early as 1894, but this was not a regular occurrence until 1920 when Kenya Colony was established. Before 1920 the area now known as Kenya was known as the British East Africa Protectorate and so there was no need to mention mount when referring to the mountain. Mount Kenya was not the only English name for the mountain as shown in Dutton's 1929 book Kenya Mountain. By the 1930s Kenya was becoming the dominant spelling, but Kenia was occasionally used. At this time both were still pronounced ˈkiːnjə in English. It is important, here, to note that the translation of the name KII-NYAA (akamba) was done by the english who do not have the equivalent pronunciation of "nya". NYA is pronounced as in lasaGNA, the italian delicacy. Then the same Akamba name was subjected to German pronunciation briefly and it turned out to Kenia. Eventually a kind of compromise resolved the name to Kenya which can be written in italian as keGNA.

Kenya achieved independence in 1963, and Jomo Kenyatta was elected as the first president. He had previously assumed this name to reflect his commitment to freeing his country and his pronunciation of his name resulted in the pronunciation of Kenya in English changing back to an approximation of the original native pronunciation, the current ˈkɛnjə. So the country was named after the colony, which in turn was named after the mountain as it is a very significant landmark. To distinguish easily between the country and the mountain, the mountain became known as Mount Kenya with the current pronunciation ˈkɛnjə. Mount Kenya is featured on the coat of arms of Kenya.

== Peaks ==
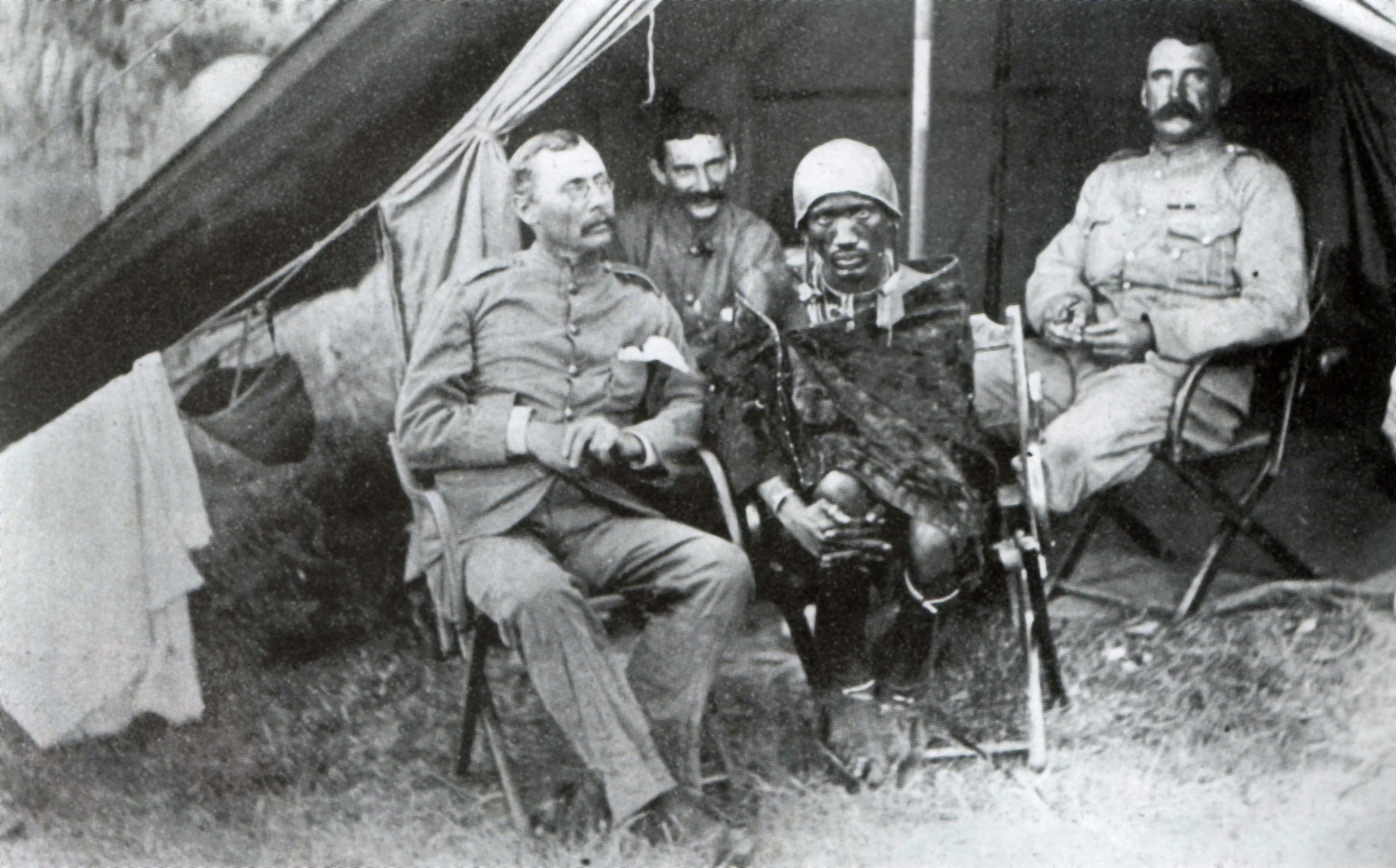
Lenana was the Chief Medicine-Man of the Maasai circa 1890. Pt Lenana was named after him by Halford Mackinder. Lenana was the son of Batian who was the previous Chief Medicine-Man.

The peaks of Mount Kenya have been given names from three different sources. Firstly, several Maasai chieftains have been commemorated, with names such as Batian, Nelion and Lenana. These names were suggested by Mackinder, on the suggestion of Sidney Langford Hinde, who was the resident officer in Maasailand at the time of Mackinder's expedition. They commemorate Mbatian, a Maasai Laibon (Medicine Man), Nelieng, his brother, and Lenana and Sendeyo, his sons. Terere is named after another Maasai headman.

The second type of names that were given to peaks are after climbers and explorers. Some examples of this are Shipton, Sommerfelt, Tilman, Dutton and Arthur. Shipton made the first ascent of Nelion, and Sommerfelt accompanied Shipton on the second ascent. Tilman made many first ascents of peaks with Shipton in 1930. Dutton and Arthur explored the mountain between 1910 and 1930. Arthur Firmin, who made many first ascents, has been remembered in Firmin's Col and also the Firmin Tower on the North Face Standard, or Firmin-Hicks route. Humphrey Slade, of Pt Slade, explored the moorland areas of the mountain in the 1930s, and possibly made the first ascent of Sendeyo.

While the primary summits bear indigenous names, many of the secondary peaks and glaciers were named after figures prominent during the British colonial period. Points John and Peter are notable exceptions, as they were named by the missionary Arthur William McGregor in reference to the biblical apostles. Point Pigott honors the Acting Administrator of the Imperial British East Africa Company during the 1893 J.W. Gregory expedition. Furthermore, a prominent group of four peaks to the east of the main summits is dedicated to early European settlers and colonial governors of the Kenya Colony, specifically Sir Robert Coryndon, Sir Edward Grigg, the influential settler Lord Delamere, and the philanthropist and explorer William Northrup McMillan.

The majority of the names were given by Melhuish and Dutton, with the exception of the Maasai names and Peter and John. Pt Thomson is not named after Joseph Thomson, who confirmed the mountain's existence, but after another J Thomson who was an official Royal Geographical Society photographer.

| Name | Reason for naming | Named by | Date named |
|---|---|---|---|
| Batian | Named after Mbatian, the chief medicine man (Laibon) of Maasai when Europeans first discovered Maasailand. | Mackinder | 1899 |
| Nelion | Named after Nelieng, the brother of Mbatian | Mackinder | 1899 |
| Pt Lenana | Named after Lenana, the second son of Mbatian and next chief medicine man. Lenana was the medicine man at the time of first ascent of Batian. | Mackinder | 1899 |
| Coryndon Peak | Named after Sir Robert Coryndon, the Governor of Kenya Colony between 1922 and 1925. | | |
| Pt Piggott | Named after J. R. W. Piggott, the administrator of British East Africa in 1893. He assisted Gregory's expedition to Mount Kenya. | Gregory | by 1900 |
| Pt Thomson | Named after Joseph Thomson, who, in 1863, confirmed Krapf's claim of the existence of Mount Kenya. | Mackinder | by 1900 |
| Pt Dutton | E. A. T Dutton explored the mountain. | | |
| Pt John | Named by a Scottish missionary after the disciple. | Arthur | |
| Pt Melhuish | Named after J. D. Melhuish, who was responsible for most of the first maps and photographs of the mountain. | Arthur | |
| Krapf Rognon | Named after Dr Krapf, who was the first European to see the mountain in 1849. | Mackinder | |
| Pt Peter | Named by a Scottish missionary after the disciple. | Arthur | |
| Pt Slade | Named after Humphrey Slade, who explored the moorland zone of Mount Kenya. He possibly also made the first ascent of Sendeyo. | | |
| Terere | Named after Terere, a Maasai laibon. | Mackinder | 1899 |
| Sendeyo | Named after Sendeyo, the eldest son of Mbatian and brother of Lenana. | Mackinder | 1899 |
| Midget Peak | Named after Madge Anderson, friend of Eric Shipton in Kenya, resp. her nickname "Midget" | Eric Shipton | 1930 |
| The Hat | | | |
| Delamere Peak | Named after Rt. Hon. Lord Delamere, who was one of the early explorers of East Africa. He arrived in Kenya Colony in 1897. | Melhuish and Dutton | |
| Macmillan Peak | Named after Sir Northrup Macmillan, an early pioneer. | Melhuish and Dutton | |
| Grigg Peak | Named after Lieut-Col. Sit Edward Grigg, who was the Governor of Kenya Colony from 1925. | Arthur | |
| Höhnel Peak (The Castle) | Named after Lieut. Ludwig von Höhnel, who was the cartographer on Teleki's expedition to the mountain. When he drew the mountain from the Ndoro, to the south, he clearly marked this peak, so Gregory named it after him. | Gregory | by 1894 |
| Arthur's Seat | Named after Rev. J. W. Arthur, who made several attempts to reach the summit. | Melhuish | |
| Sommerfelt Peak | Named after G. A. Sommerfelt, who climbed Batian with Shipton and Harris on 8 January 1929. | Dutton | |
| Three Sisters | Named for their appearance. "Three slim columns of rock separated from each other by the merest cracks." | Melhuish and Dutton | |
| The Tooth | Named for its appearance. | Melhuish and Dutton | |
| The Castle (Höhnel Peak) | | | |
| Gate of Mists | Named for its physical appearance, and because "Kenya" is a corruption of the Maasai word for "mist". | Mackinder | 1899 |
| Shipton Peak | Named after E. E. Shipton, who made the first ascent of Nelion and second ascent of Batian in 1929. | Dutton | |
| Grand and Petit Gendarmes | Named for their physical appearance. | Shipton and Tilman | 1930 |
| Tilman Peak | Named after Tilman, who made many climbs with Shipton in 1930. | | |
| Pt John Minor | | | |
| Thomson's Flake | | | |
| Western Terminal | | | |
| Eastern Terminal | | | |
| Kibatia | | | |
| Rutundu | | | |
| Giants Billiards Table (also known as Kilingo) | Visually the mountain is very flat topped. | Name mentioned on Mackinder's 1900 map | by 1900 |
| Kilingo (also known as Giants Billiards Table) | | | |
| Mugi Hill | | | by 1926 |
| The Barrow | | | |
| Ithanguni | | | |
| East Mountain (later renamed Ithanguni) | | Mackinder | 1899 |
| Highland Castle | | | |
| Biruoini | | | |
| The Twins | Photographed (and potentially named) by Melhuish. | | |

== Valleys ==
| Name | Reason for naming | Named by | Date named |
|---|---|---|---|
| Carr Valley | Named after Ernest Carr, who discovered the Carr Lakes and erected two huts on the mountain. He built a road up the east side of the mountain from Chogoria, and was the founder of the Mountain Club of East Africa. | Melhuish and Dutton | |
| Gorges Valley | Named after Brig-General Edmund Howard Gorges, who reinforced Mackinder's expedition in 1899. | Mackinder | by 1900 |
| Hausberg Valley | Named after C. B. Hausberg, who attained the summit of Batian with Mackinder, and was the photographer of the expedition. | Mackinder | by 1900 |
| Hinde Valley | Named after Sidney Langford Hinde, who assisted Mackinder's expedition. | Mackinder | by 1900 |
| Hobley Valley | Named after C. W. Hobley, who made an expedition to the mountain with Dundas in 1891 where they traversed the forest zone. The expedition probably would have reached this valley, had they penetrated the forest. | Gregory | by 1900 |
| Höhnel Valley | Named after Lieut. Ludwig von Höhnel, who was the cartographer on Teleki's expedition to the mountain. | Gregory | by 1894 |
| Teleki Valley | Named after Count Samuel Teleki, who led the first expedition to penetrate the forest zone of Mount Kenya in 1887. The expedition entered this valley. | Gregory | by 1894 |
| Mackinder Valley | Named after Mackinder, who made the first ascent of Batian in 1899. | | by 1900 |
| Guaso Mairi Valley | This valley was named after the river that originates here. | Gregory | |

== Lakes ==
| Name | Reason for naming | Named by | Date named | Co-ordinates |
|---|---|---|---|---|
| Carr Lakes | Named after Ernest Carr, who discovered the Carr Lakes and erected two huts on the mountain. He built a road up the east side of the mountain from Chogoria, and was the founder of the Mountain Club of East Africa. | Melhuish and Dutton | | |
| Lake Ellis | Named after Thomas Evelyn Scott-Ellis, who was the first European to reach the lake in 1927. | Dutton | | |
| Gitchini Tarn (now known as Hanging Tarn) | Named after Gitchini, the personal servant of Melhuish, who accompanied him on many expeditions. | Melhuish and Dutton | | |
| Hall Tarns | Named after F. G. Hall, the District Commissioner at Fort Hall. | Mackinder | by 1900 | |
| Harris Tarn | Named after P. Wyn Harris, who made the first ascent of Nelion and second ascent of Batian with Shipton in 1929. | Dutton | 1926-1929 | |
| Lake Höhnel | Named after Lieut. Ludwig von Höhnel, who was the cartographer on Teleki's expedition to the mountain. | Gregory | 1894 | |
| Lake Michaelson | Named after a friend of Mackinder who took an interest in his expedition in 1899. | Mackinder | by 1900 | |
| Teleki Tarns | Named after Count Samuel Teleki, who led the first expedition to penetrate the forest zone of Mount Kenya in 1887. | Gregory | by 1894 | |
| Thompson Tarns | Named after W. Bird Thompson, who was the leader of the British East African expedition to the mountain in 1891. | Gregory | | |
| Gallery Tarn | Named for its appearance. | Melhuish and Dutton | | |
| Curling Pond | Arthur taught Melhuish to curl on this pond. | Melhuish | 1919 | |
| Hook Tarn | Named after Raymond Hook. | Melhuish and Dutton | | |
| Simba Tarn | Porters insisted they saw a lion here in 1924. | Melhuish and Dutton | | |
| Lake Alice | Named after the Duchess of Gloucester, who visited Kenya just after the lake was discovered. | Melhuish and Dutton | | |
| Polishman's Tarn | Named because a Polish artist was looking for a good view of the peaks and was directed to this tarn. | Melhuish and Dutton | | |
| Kikami | Kikami is the Kĩkũyũ word for hyrax, and there are lots of hyrax here. | Melhuish and Dutton | | |
| Hanging Tarn (used to be known as Gitchini Tarn) | | Melhuish and Dutton | | |
| Oblong Tarn | | | | |
| Square Tarn | | | | |
| Kami Tarn | | | | |
| Emerald Tarn | | | | |
| Nanyuki Tarn | The tarn is named after the river that it flows into. Nanyuki means red-brown in Maasai; the colour of the river when it floods in the wet season. | | | |
| Hut Tarn | | | | |
| Tyndall Tarn | | | | |
| Lewis Tarn | | | | |
| Hidden Tarn | | | | |
| Enchanted Lake | | | | |
| Kech Tarn | | | | |
| Lake Rutundu | | | | |
| Naro Moru Tarn | | | | |
| Sacred Lake | | | | |

== Glaciers ==
| Name | Reason for naming | Named by | Date named | Area (km^{2}) | Date when this area was recorded |
|---|---|---|---|---|---|
| Lewis | Named as a memorial to Prof. Henry Carvell Lewis who revolutionised views on British and American glacial geology. | Gregory | by 1894 | 0.3 | 1983 |
| Gregory | Named after Dr. J. W. Gregory, who was the first European to reach the glaciers of Mount Kenya in 1892 (1893?). | Mackinder | by 1900 | 0.08 | 1983 |
| Tyndall | Named after John Tyndall, who wrote works on Alpine Glaciers, movements of glaciers and glaciation. | Gregory | by 1900 | 0.09 | 1983 |
| Forel | Named after Forel, a Swiss geologist. Named because it was useful for the glaciers to have names when they were being surveyed. | Gregory | | 0.03 | 1983 |
| Heim | Named after Heim, a Swiss geologist. Named because it was useful for the glaciers to have names when they were being surveyed. | Gregory | | 0.02 | 1983 |
| Krapf | Named after Dr Krapf, who was the first European to see the mountain in 1849. | Mackinder | by 1900 | 0.04 | 1983 |
| Barlow | Named after A. R. Barlow, who ascended to the peaks three times and made a collection of photographs of the mountain. | Melhuish and Arthur | | | Last recorded 1926 |
| Cesar | Named after Cesar Ollier, a guide on Mackinder's expedition in 1899. | Mackinder | by 1900 | 0.03 | 1983 |
| Darwin | Named after Charles Darwin, who made the first precise description of a glacial corrie in Britain. | Gregory | by 1929 | 0.04 | 1983 |
| Diamond | Named because it is so hard. | Mackinder | 1899 | 0.01 | 1983 |
| Josef | Named after Josef Brocherel, a guide on Mackinder's expedition in 1899. | Gregory Mackinder or Arthur and Melhuish | by 1900 | 0.03 | 1983 |
| Melhuish | Named after J. D. Melhuish, who was responsible for most of the first maps and photographs of the mountain. | Arthur | | | Last recorded 1978 |
| Northey | Named after Major-General Sir Edward Northey, a Governor of Kenya in the 1920s. | Melhuish and Arthur | | 0.03 | 1983 |
| Kolbe | Named after Dr Kolbe, who reached the open moorland above the eastern forest on Mount Kenya. | Gregory Mackinder or Melhuish and Arthur | by 1900 | | Last recorded 1947 |
| Mackinder | | | | | Last recorded 1899 |
| Northwest Piggott | | | | | Last recorded 1926 |
| Arthur | | | | | Last recorded 1926 |
| Peter | | | | | Last recorded 1926 |

== Rivers ==
Rivers starting above 3,000 metres (9,800 ft) are listed clockwise around the mountain from the north. Tributaries rivers which include the original name in their names are not listed, for example Liki North and Liki South. The rivers on Mount Kenya have been named after the villages on the slopes of the mountain that they flow close to. The Thuchi River is the district boundary between Meru and Embu. Mount Kenya is a major water tower for the Tana river which in 1988 supplied 80% of Kenya's electricity using a series of seven hydroelectric power stations and dams.

| Name | Co-ordinate at 3,000 metres (9,800 ft) | General flow direction | Tributary of |
|---|---|---|---|
| Sirimon | 0°2′S 37°17′E | NW | Ewaso Ng'iro |
| Marania | 0°0′N 37°0′E | NNE | Ewaso Ng'iro |
| Luguso | 0°0′S 37°27′E | NNE | Ewaso Ng'iro |
| Kazita | 0°2′S 37°28′E | NE | Tana |
| Mutonga | 0°7′S 37°29′E | SE | Tana |
| Nithi | 0°10′S 37°26′E | SE | Tana |
| Ruguti | 0°12′S 37°25′E | SE | Tana |
| Thuchi | 0°13′S 37°24′E | SE | Tana |
| Rupingazi | 0°14′S 37°22′E | SSE | Nyamindi then Tana |
| Nyamindi | 0°16′S 37°19′E | SSE | Reservoirs then Tana |
| Keringa | 0°17′S 37°16′E | SSW | Sagana then Tana |
| Sagana | 0°15′S 37°15′E | SW | Reservoirs then Tana |
| Thego | 0°14′S 37°14′E | SW | Sagana then Tana |
| Nairobi | 0°12′S 37°13′E | W | Sagana then Tana |
| Naro Moru | 0°10′S 37°13′E | W | Ewaso Ng'iro |
| Burguret | 0°9′S 37°14′E | W | Ewaso Ng'iro |
| Nanyuki | 0°7′S 37°14′E | NW | Ewaso Ng'iro |
| Liki | 0°5′S 37°15′E | WNW | Ewaso Ng'iro |
| Ontulili | 0°3′S 37°16′E | WNW | Ewaso Ng'iro |

== Other features ==
| Name | Type of feature | Reason for naming | Named by | Date named |
|---|---|---|---|---|
| Shipton's Cave | Cave | Named after E. E. Shipton, who used the cave as a base camp when exploring the northern side of the mountain with Tilman in 1930. | | |
| Vivienne Falls | Waterfall | Named after Miss Vivienne de Watteville, who was an explorer on the mountain when Shipton was there in 1929. | Mackinder | |
| The Gates | Waterfall | Named after the gorge that the Nithi River runs through. | | by 1926 |
| Vertical Bog | | | | |
| Foxes Cave | Cave | | | |
| Kampi ya Farasi | | | | |
| Kampi ya Machengeni | | | | |
| Percival's Bridge | | | | |
| The Scoop | | | | |
| Raguti Springs | Soda water springs | | Mentioned by Dutton | |
| Mbairunyi | Clearing in the bamboo zone at 2,500 metres (8,200 ft) | The name means "Place of Fighting". According to Dutton it is the highest point to which the local people used to climb on Mount Kenya, and is the site of a fight between the Embu and Meru. | Named before Dutton | |
| Gacheno | Small glade in the forest zone | The name means "Place of Danger" as the local people were afraid of starvation this high on the mountain. | Named before Dutton | |
| Kethimbui | Small glade in the forest zone. | The name means "Place of Rest". | Named before Dutton | |
| The Temple | 300 metres (1,000 ft) cliff | | | |
| The Saddle | Moorland, large area between main peaks and Ithanguni | | Mackinder | 1899 |
| Firmin's Tower | A pillar of rock on the north face of Batian | Arthur Firmin climbed this tower on the first ascent of the North Face Standard Route up Batian | | 1944 |
