= Johanna Alida Coetzee =

South African pollen researcher (1921-2007)

- J.A Coetzee in 1970
- Born: 7 July 1921; Johannesburg, South Africa
- Died: 28 April 2007 (aged 85); Somerset West
- Education: University of the Witwatersrand (MSc); University of the Free State (DSc)
- Known for: fossil pollen analysis
- Scientific career
- Fields: Palynology
- Workplaces: University of the Witwatersrand; University of Natal; University of the Free State
- Thesis: Pollen analytical studies in east and southern Africa. (1964)

Johanna Alida Coetzee (1921 - 2007) (also known as Joey Coetzee) was a researcher in the field of Palynology at the University of the Free State and a pioneer in the analysis of fossil pollen. Her DSc thesis received worldwide recognition and praise from the eminent glacial geologist Richard Foster Flint and helped recognise the significance of temperature changes in controlling shifts in global and local vegetation zones.

== Education and career ==
Coetzee was born in 1921 in Johannesburg and was educated at the Jeppe High School for Girls. She completed a master's degree in Botany at the University of the Witwatersrand. She performed some postgraduate work at the University of the Witwatersrand and the University of Natal before moving to the University of the Free State where she was appointed as an assistant botanist in the Department of Botany in 1946. Coetzee made several overseas journeys where she studied with various experts in the field of botany, including a three-month period with Gunnar Erdtman, the pioneer of palynology.

In the late 1950s and 1960s Coetzee travelled with her mentor, Eduard Meine van Zinderen-Bakker, in search of lakes and swamps that would be suitable for fossil pollen analysis, including such places as Mount Kenya in east Africa and the Lesotho Highlands in southern Africa.

Coetzee served on several committees connected with the studies of the Quaternary period and palynology and from 1978 to 1988, she served as the editor of the journal Palaeoecology of Africa.

=== Research ===
The highlight of her career was the completion of the 33 000 year BP pollen sequence from Sacred Lake on Mount Kenya. This work formed part of her DSc thesis, entitled Pollen analytical studies in east and southern Africa and was featured in volume 3 of Palaeoecology of Africa and the Surrounding Islands and Antarctica. Her work helped to show that glacial episodes were not confined to the Northern Hemisphere. The accepted view at the time was that high humidity Pluvial phases in the east African region, which did not experience glaciation, coincided with glaciations of the higher latitude regions. Coetzee's research, in conjunction with van Zinderen Bakker, helped change these views by recognising the significance of temperature changes in controlling shifts in vegetation zones.

Her research in the 1970s and 1980s helped establish the importance of temperature changes in the history of African vegetation during the Quaternary and that ice ages were not wetter there. It also clarified the history of the South African fynbos biome by tracing the origins of diverse fynbos vegetation, identified by fossil pollen to be types of Palmae, Winteraceae, Casuarinaceae, Chloranthaceae, and Sarcolaenaceae amongst others in Cenozoic deposits. The research also showed that during the Neogene period global cooling and Antarctic glaciation drove the replacement of subtropical woodlands by fynbos.

Coetzee became a senior lecturer in botany at the University of the Free State and was later appointed a professor of botany. She retired from the university in 1988.

== Selected publications ==
- Coetzee, J. A. (1964). "Evidence for a Considerable Depression of the Vegetation Belts during the Upper Pleistocene on the East African Mountains". Nature. 204 (4958). Springer Science and Business Media LLC: 564–566. Bibcode:1964Natur.204..564C. doi:10.1038/204564a0. ISSN 0028-0836. S2CID 4184470.
- Coetzee, J.A. (1967). "Pollen analytical studies in east and southern Africa". Palaeoecology of Africa. 3: 1–146. presented at the 5Th Session of the Pan-African Congress on Prehistory and Quaternary Studies
- Coetzee, J.A. (1978). "Climatic and biological changes in South-Western Africa during the Late Cainozoic". Palaeoecology of Africa. 10: 13–29.
- Coetzee, J.A. (1978). "Late Cainozoic palaeoenvironments of Southern Africa". In van Zinderen Bakker, E.M.; Balkema, A. A. (eds.). Antarctic glacial history and world palaeoenvironments. Rotterdam. pp. 115–127.
- Coetzee, J.A.; Muller, J. (1984). "The phytogeographic significance of some extinct Gondwana pollen types from the Tertiary of the southwestern Cape (South Africa)". Annals of the Missouri Botanical Garden. 71 (4): 1088–1099. doi:10.2307/2399246. JSTOR 2399246.
- Coetzee, J. A.; Praglowski, J. (1988). "Winteraceae pollen from the miocene of the southwestern cape (south africa)". Grana. 27 (1). Informa UK Limited: 27–37. doi:10.1080/00173138809427730. ISSN 0017-3134.

== Personal life ==
On retiring from the Department of Botany at the University of the Free State in 1988, Coetzee moved to Somerset West, Western Cape. She died on 28 April 2007.
