= Jan C. A. Boeyens =

South African Chemistry educator (b. 1934, d.2015)

- Born: Jan Christoffel Antonie Boeyens; October 2, 1934; Wesselsbron, Free State, South Africa
- Died: August 26, 2015 (aged 80); Broederstroom, North West, South Africa
- Education: University of Pretoria
- Spouse: Martha Boeyens (Hunter)
- Children: Jan Boeyens, Aletta Michalopoulos, Larisa Brody
- Scientific career
- Workplaces: University of South Africa, CSIR, Stanford University, University of the Witwatersrand

Jan C. A. Boeyens FRSSAf (October 2, 1934 – August 26, 2015) was a South African chemist and educator.

Boeyens was educated at the University of Pretoria. He worked at the Council for Scientific and Industrial Research of South Africa and at Stanford University. He became a professor of chemistry at the University of the Witwatersrand and Extraordinary Professor at UNISA.

He has written or co-written more than 600 scientific contributions. Some of his books are used as textbooks of theoretical chemistry all over the world.

As an emeritus he wrote books challenging the current scientific consensus about the adequacy of quantum mechanics in which he presented a way to establish more accurate modern physics and chemistry without using higher mathematics by using elementary number theory.

== Biography ==
=== Education and career in chemistry ===
Jan Boeyens was born 2 October 1934 in Wesselsbron, Free State, South Africa. He attended the University of the Orange Free State and in 1955 he obtained a BSc (Chemistry, Physics, Mathematics), in 1956 a BSc(Hons) (Chemistry) and in 1957 MSc (Cum Laude) (Chemistry). He was appointed lecturer in chemistry at the University of the Orange Free State from 1958 to 1960.

He was lecturer in Physical Chemistry at the University of South Africa (UNISA) and worked at the National Physical Laboratory of the Council for Scientific and Industrial Research (CSIR) where he was Chief Research officer and Head of Crystallography division: Physical Chemistry Group from 1961 to 1963.

He attended the University of Pretoria from 1963 to 1964 and obtained a DSc (with Honours) (Physical and Theoretical Chemistry). His postdoctoral studies were at Stanford University from 1965 to 1966 where he was a Research Associate: Physical Chemistry.

He worked at the National Institute for Metallurgy, MINTEK as Chief Scientist and Director of Mintek Research Group for Applied Structural Chemistry, Rand Afrikaans University from 1971 to 1973. He was appointed Honorary Lecturer at Rand Afrikaans University from 1973 to 1975. In 1976 he was a Visiting Researcher at the University of Sussex, England.

He returned to the National Physical Laboratory of the CSIR in 1976 where he worked as Head: Physical Chemistry (Structural Chemistry and X-ray Crystallography) until 1980.

He was appointed Professor of Theoretical Physics at the University of the Witwatersrand (WITS) from 1981 to 1999. He was also a visiting professor at Texas A&M University in 1984. Boeyens was appointed Head: Department of Chemistry at WITS from 1984 to 1990 and again from 1997 to 1999. From 1986 to 1999 he was the Director: Centre for Molecular Design at WITS and from 1991 to 1993 became the Dean: Faculty of Science. He was visiting professor at the Free University of Berlin in 1994, and at the University of Heidelberg, Germany in 1998, 2005, 2006, 2007 and 2010.

He lectured as professor of chemistry and was Head, Department of Chemistry at the University of Pretoria from 2000 to 2004. In 2005 he was appointed Extraordinary Professor at the Centre for Advancement of Scholarship, University of Pretoria.

=== Family life ===
Boeyens married Martha Hunter in 1960. They had three children, Jan, Aletta and Larisa. He died on 28 August 2015 in Broederstroom, North West, South Africa after returning home from a crystallography conference.

== Societies and awards ==
Boeyens belonged to the followings societies:

- Royal Society of SA (Fellow)
- SA Chemical Institute (Life member)
- SA Crystallographic (Society Member)
- American Chemical Society (Former member)
- Journal of Chemical Crystallography (Editorial board until 2012)
- International Union of Crystallography (IUCr) (National Committee Chairman 1990 to 1994)
- NY Academy of Sciences (Former member)
- SA Academy of Science (Founder member – resigned)
- International Union of Crystallography Executive (1996 to 2002)
- University Council, WITS (1997 to 1999)

He received the following awards:

- AECI Medal 1973, 1981
- SACI Gold Medal 1983
- Ernst Oppenheimer Fellowship 1984
- SA Akademie Havenga Prize 1986
- Alumnus of the Year, Univ. of Free State 1987
- Claude Harris Leon Award 1992
- Alexander von Humboldt Research Prize 1993
- Distinguished Research Award, WITS 1995
- Naming: Jan Boeyens Laboratory, WITS 2000
- Merck Medal 2004
- Centennial Leading Mind, Univ. of Pretoria 2008

The first Jan Boeyens Medal for outstanding young scientists (younger than 40 years) in theoretical Chemistry or Physics was awarded to Prof Gideon Steyl from the University of the Free State Chemistry department in 2009.

== Publications ==
Boeyens authored 7 books and more than 270 other publications. His books are listed below.

- Boeyens, Jan C. A. (2003), The Theories of Chemistry, Elsevier, ISBN 978-0-444-51491-2.
- Boeyens, Jan C. A. (2005), New Theories for Chemistry, Elsevier, ISBN 978-0-444-51867-5.
- Boeyens, Jan C. A.; Levendis, Demetrius C. (2008), Number Theory and the Periodicity of Matter, Berlin: Springer-Verlag, Bibcode:2008ntpm.book.....B, ISBN 978-1-4020-6659-7.
- Boeyens, Jan C. A. (2008), Chemistry from First Principles, Berlin: Springer-Verlag, ISBN 978-1-4020-8545-1.
- Boeyens, Jan C. A. (2010), Chemical Cosmology, Dordrecht: Springer-Verlag, ISBN 978-90-481-3827-2.
- Boeyens, Jan C. A.; Comba, Peter (2013), Electronic Structure and Number Theory: Bohr's Boldest Dreams, Springer-Verlag, ISBN 978-3-642-31976-1.
- Boeyens, Jan C. A. (2013), The chemistry of matter waves, Dordrecht: Springer-Verlag, ISBN 978-94-007-7577-0

== Quotes ==
In some of his books and articles Boeyens held some dissident views on several subjects:

Numerologists can interpret great historical and cosmic events, predict the future and explain human nature.

Volumes have been written about the red herring known as Schrödinger’s cat. Without science writers looking for sensation, it is difficult to see how such nonsense could ever become a topic for serious scientific discussion.

He was also a strong believer in practical work to obtain tangible results over theoretical calculations:

All advances in chemistry happen at the bench, as it should, but without the theoretical understanding, even of common events such as intramolecular rearrangement. No calculation can predict chemical reactions.

His book Number Theory and the Periodicity of Matter (co-authored with Demetrius C. Levendis) references the work of Peter Plichta. In it they try to replace modern quantum physics with elementary number theory, but unlike Plichta they do not question the general theory of relativity:

It is a myth that chemistry derives from quantum theory. More fundamental than both is the periodic table that reduces the properties of matter to a number basis, which is revealed only peripherally in the differential equations of quantum theory.
