= Havenga prize =

Annual prize awarded for original research in science in South Africa

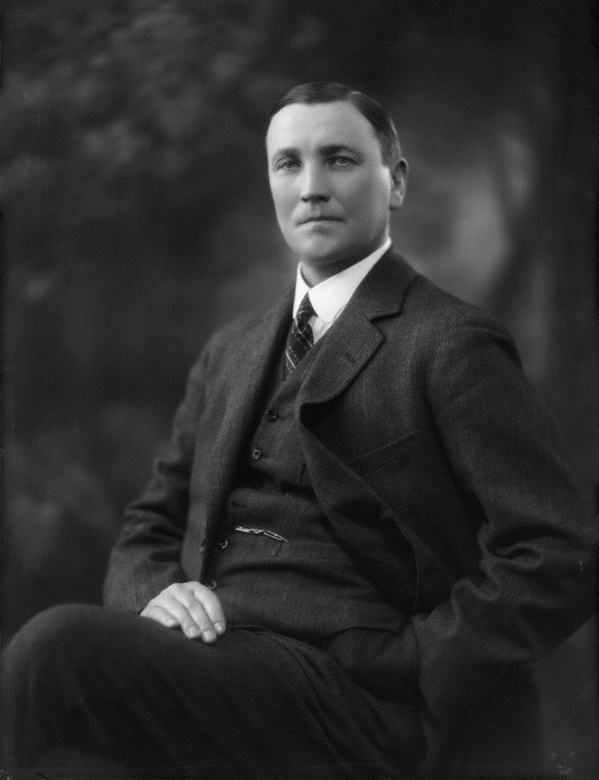
Nicolaas Christiaan Havenga (1882–1957)

The Havenga Prize (Havengaprys in Afrikaans) is a prize awarded annually by the Suid-Afrikaanse Akademie vir Wetenskap en Kuns (South African Academy for Science and Arts) to a candidate for original research in the Sciences since 1945. Candidates are judged on the quality of research publications and evidence of the promotion of Afrikaans. The Havenga prize can only be awarded to a person once, but can be awarded posthumously.

The prize is named after Finance Minister Nicolaas Christiaan Havenga, who donated £50 annually to the academy for the prize from 1946. A bequest of R4 000 was received from Havenga's estate and R14 000 from the estate of his wife, Olive. Since 1979 the prize has been awarded in the form of a gold medal.

== Havenga prize winners ==
- 1947 – Dr. T.E.W. Schumann (Mathematics and Physics); Dr. P.J. du Toit (Medicine); Dr. H.O. Mönnig (Medicine)
- 1948 – Dr. A.I. Malan (Chemistry); Dr. R.J. Ortlepp (Biology); Prof. C.G.S. de Villiers (Biology)
- 1949 – Prof. Dr. D.L. Scholtz (Geology); Dr. S.J. du Plessis (Agricultural Sciences)
- 1950 – Dr. M.H. de Kock (Economics); Dr. R. Campbell Begg (Medicine)
- 1951 – Prof. Meiring Naudé (Mathematics and Physics); Prof. HL de Waal (Chemistry)
- 1952 – Dr. A.J. Heese (Biology); Dr. M.M. Loubser (Engineering)
- 1953 – Prof. Dr. E.H.D. Arndt (Economics); Prof. JJ Theron (Agricultural Sciences)
- 1954 – Dr. D.G. Steyn (Medicine); Prof. H.A.W. Verlegen (Mathematics and Physics)
- 1955 – Dr. L.T. Nel (Geology); Dr. F.J. de Villiers (Chemistry); Dr. T.J.W. Jorden (Chemistry)
- 1956 – Dr. C.S. Grobler (Biology); Dr. C.R. van der Merwe (Agricultural Sciences)
- 1957 – Prof. F.R. Tomlinson (Economics); Prof. W.O. Neitz (Medicine)
- 1958 – Dr. A.J. Petrick (Chemistry); Prof. D.J. Malan (Mathematics and Physics)
- 1959 – Dr. L.D. Boonstra (Biology); Dr. A.J.A. Roux (Engineering)
- 1960 – Prof. D.G. Franzsen (Economics); Prof. I. de V. Malherbe (Agricultural Sciences)
- 1961 – Prof. M.W. Henning (Medicine); Dr. J.N. van Niekerk (Physics); Prof. H. Rund (Mathematics)
- 1962 – Prof. H.G.W.J. Schweickerdt (Biology); Prof. G.W. Perold (Chemistry)
- 1963 – Prof. T.W. Gevers (Geology); Prof. B.J. Dippenaar (Agricultural Sciences)
- 1964 – Prof. O.S. Heyns (Medicine); Dr. A. Strasheim (Mathematics and Physics)
- 1965 – Prof. G. Eloff (Biology); Prof. J.D.J. Hofmeyr (Biology); Dr. P.R. Enslin (Chemistry)
- 1966 – Dr. W.L. Grant (Engineering); Prof. D.M. Joubert (Agricultural Sciences)
- 1967 – Prof. A.J. Brink (Medicine); Prof. J. H. van der Merwe (Mathematics and Physics)
- 1968 – Prof. P.A.J. Ryke (Biology); Prof. D.G. Roux (Chemistry)
- 1969 – Prof. D.R. Osterhoff (Agricultural Sciences); Dr. W.P. de Kock (Geology)
- 1970 – Prof. W.E. Frahn (Physics); Prof. H.P. Wassermann (Medicine); Prof. H.S. Steyn (Mathematics)
- 1971 – Prof. J.A. van Eeden (Biology); Prof. V. Pretorius (Chemistry); Dr. N. Stutterheim (Engineering)
- 1972 – Prof. J. de Villiers (Geology); Prof. D.G. Haylett (Agricultural Sciences)
- 1973 – Prof. P.H. Stoker (Physics); Prof. J.H. Louw (Medicine); Dr. A.P. Burger (Mathematics)
- 1974 – Prof. M. P. de Vos (Biology); Prof. C.J.H. Schutte (Chemistry)
- 1975 – Prof. O.R. van Eeden (Geology); Prof. A.P.G. Söhnge (Geology); Prof. B.C. Jansen (Agricultural Sciences)
- 1976 – Prof. C.W.F.T. Pistorius (Physics, posthumus); Prof. H.W. Snyman (Medicine); Prof. G.J. Hauptfleisch (Mathematics)
- 1977 – Prof. M.J. Toerien (Biology); Prof. C.F. Garbers (Chemistry); Dr. J.J. Wannenburg (Engineering)
- 1978 – Dr. J.E. van der Plank (Agricultural Sciences); Dr. J.W. von Backström (Geology); Dr. J.F. Enslin (Geology)
- 1979 – Prof. B.J. Meyer (Medicine); Prof. P.C. Haarhoff (Physics); Prof. H.J. Schutte (Mathematics)
- 1980 – Prof. H.P. van der Schijff (Biology)
- 1981 – Prof. F.J. Joubert (Chemistry); Dr. H.G. Denkhaus (Engineering); Mr. A.F. Lombaard (Geology); Dr. B.W. Strydom (Agricultural Sciences)
- 1982 – Prof. P.J. Pretorius (Medicine); Prof. C.A. Engelbrecht (Physics); Prof. H.S.P. Grässer (Mathematics)
- 1983 – Prof. C.W. Holzapfel (Chemistry); Prof. N. Grobbelaar (Biology)
- 1984 – Prof. L. van Biljon (Engineering); Prof. W.J. van Biljon (Geology); Prof. J. Heyns (Agricultural Sciences)
- 1985 – Prof. R.H. Lemmer (Physics); Prof. D.J. de Waal (Mathematics); Prof. J.N. Coetzee (Medicine)
- 1986 – Prof. J.C.A. Boeyens (Chemistry); Prof. D.G. Kröger (Engineering); Prof. E.M. van Zinderen-Bakker (Biology)
- 1987 – Dr. D.W. Verwoerd (Agricultural Sciences); Prof. W.J. Verwoerd (Geology)
- 1988 – Prof. J.H. Venter (Mathematics); Prof. J.S. Vermaak (Physics); Prof. O.W. Prozesky (Medicine)
- 1989 – Prof. B.V. Burger (Chemistry); Prof. G.N. Louw (Biology); Prof. J.D. van Wyk (Engineering)
- 1990 – Prof. Dr. J.N.J. Visser (Geology); Prof. J.C. Bonsma (Agricultural Sciences)
- 1991 – Prof. Dr. G.C.L. Brümmer (Mathematics); Prof. F.J.W. Hahne (Physics); Prof. A. du P. Heyns (Medicine)
- 1992 – Dr. P.S. Steyn (Chemistry); Prof. J. van Staden (Biology); Prof. G. van R. Marais (Engineering)
- 1993 – Prof. D.J.L. Visser (Geology); Prof. I.S. Pretorius (Agricultural Sciences)
- 1994 – Dr. J.T. Fourie (Physics); Prof. A. Lochner (Medicine); Prof. J.J. Grobler (Mathematical Sciences)
- 1995 – Prof. J.G.C. Small (Biology); Prof. A.M. Heyns (Chemical Sciences); Prof. J.A.G. Malherbe (Engineering)
- 1996 – Prof. I.C. Rust (Geology); Prof. Z.A. Pretorius (Agricultural Sciences)
- 1997 – Prof. F. Lombaard (Mathematical Sciences); Prof. H. Fiedeldey (Physics, posthumus); Prof. H.J. Odendaal (Medicine)
- 1998 – Prof. M.J. Wingfield (Biology); Prof. D. Ferreira (Chemical Sciences)
- 1999 – Prof. A. Eicker (Agricultural Sciences); Prof. C.P. Snyman (Geology)
- 2000 – Prof. J.F. van Staden (Chemical Sciences); Prof. J.J.A. van der Walt (Biological Sciences)
- 2001 – Prof. R.C. Franz (Medicine); Prof. P.W. Crous (Biological Sciences)
- 2002 – Prof. J.R.E. Lutjeharms (Physical Sciences); Prof. F.C. Botha (Biological Sciences)
- 2003 – Prof. J.N. Eloff (Biological Sciences); Prof. H. Moraal (Physical Sciences)
- 2004 – Prof. H. Huismans (Biological Sciences)
- 2005 – Prof. T.E. Cloete (Biological Sciences)
- 2006 – Prof. D.P. Laurie (Mathematical Sciences); Prof. Ben-Erik van Wyk (Biological Sciences)
- 2007 – Prof. H.H. Vorster (Medicine); Prof. A.J. Reinecke (Biological Sciences)
- 2008 – Prof. M.A. du Plessis (Biological Sciences); Prof. H.G. Raubenheimer (Chemical Sciences); Prof. I.C. Dormehl (Physical Sciences)
- 2009 – Prof. J.W.H. Swanepoel (Mathematics); Prof. J-H. Hofmeyr (Biology)
- 2010 – Prof. A.E. van Wyk (Life Sciences)
- 2011 – Prof. D.E. Rawlings (Life Sciences)
- 2012 – Prof. M.S. Potgieter (Technological Sciences); Prof. N.C. Bennett (Life Sciences)
- 2013 – Prof. D. Richardson (Life Sciences); Prof. T.F. Kruger (Health Sciences)
- 2015 – Prof. L.M.T. Dicks (Life Sciences); Prof. J.P. Petzer (Physical Sciences)
- 2016 – Prof. A.M. Viljoen (Life Sciences); Prof. R.C. Pattinson (Health Sciences)
- 2017 – Prof. J. Roux (Life Sciences); Prof. H.B. Geyer (Physical Sciences)
- 2018 – Prof. E. van Zyl (Life Sciences); Prof. B.M. Herbst (Physical Sciences)
- 2019 - Prof. I. A. Dubery (Plant metabolomics); Prof. B. Huisamen (Health Sciences)
- 2020 – Prof. J.A.C. Weideman (Physical Sciences); Prof. Bernard Slipper (Life Sciences)
- 2021 – Prof. J.M.M. Meyer (Life Sciences); prof. O.B.W. Greeff (Health Sciences)
- 2022 – Prof. H.C. Swart (Physical Sciences)

== Sources ==
Mostly compiled from akademie.co.za (in Afrikaans), archived on The WaybackMachine
