= Jeppe High School for Girls =

Coordinates: 26.19692°S 28.09212°E

Location
- 160 Roberts Avenue, Kensington; Johannesburg, Gauteng 2094; South Africa

Information
- Type: Public & Boarding
- Motto: "Forti Nihil Diffilcilius"
- Established: 1919; 107 years ago
- Founder: Sir Julius Jeppe
- School board: National Senior Certificate
- School district: D9
- Principal: Sybil Bhagwan
- Grades: 8–12
- Enrollment: 950
- Average class size: 33
- Campus: Urban Campus
- Colors: Black; Gold; Green
- Song: [Jeppe School Song]
- Nickname: Jeppe
- Accreditation: Gauteng Department of Education
- School fees: R42 000
- Alumni: Jeppe Old Girls
- Houses: Harveya, Disa, Protea, Nerine, Crassula, Gerbera
- Website: www.jeppegirls.co.za

Jeppe High School for Girls is a public English language high school for girls in the suburb of Kensington in Johannesburg in the Gauteng province of South Africa. The school had a 100% matric pass rate in 2014. It was once part of the oldest public school in Johannesburg, Jeppe High School for Boys (known then as Jeppestown High School for Boys and Girls) until 1919, when a separate premises for the girls was built. The brother school is Jeppe High School for Boys.

== History ==
The predecessor of the Jeppe Schools, was St. Michael's College. This was an Anglican private school on the corner of Commissioner and Crowns Street in Fairview. The initial number of learners when the school opened was 25. The headmaster of the school was Rev. H B Sidwell. His successor was Rev. George Perry, in 1891.

The buildings of the college and the site on which its grounds lay were bought by the Witwatersrand Council for education, in 1896, as the school was struggling to function. The school was re-opened, in April 1897, by the council as Jeppestown Grammar School. 15 boys enrolled into the school and the first headmaster of the school was Mr. H Hardwick. However, financial issues of the school forced the council to reduce its disbursement. As a result, Mr. Hardwick and the rest of the schools staff were given notice. On 1 October 1898, a group of Jeppestown parents bought the school from the council for £2,500. The staff had been replaced, but Mr. Hardwick remained the headmaster of the school.

In 1899, the outbreak of the Anglo-Boer War forced the school to close down as the number of students slowly decreased. Mr. Harwick left in 1899, in September.

The school re-opened, after the war, as Jeppestown High School for Girls and Boys. It was opened in the same building of the Grammar School, and was one of the first co-educational schools, opened by the Transvaal Education Department (T.E.D). The precise date of the re-opening is unknown. it is believed to be during the first quarter of the year 1902, as a letter sent to the Department of education by the school about the teachers being unwilling to teach under the conditions of the unfinished building as well as there not being enough space for the number of children, was sent on 9 April of that year.

The Parents' Committee experienced financial hardships at the same time of the school's construction. In September 1902, the Education Department was presented with an ultimatum, which stated that either they purchase the premises or vacate it, by October that year. The Public Works Department advised for. Purchase to be made, until a new school building could be constructed.

The new headmaster of the school, in 1902, was Mr. C D Hope. He remained headmaster until he left in 1904. He was succeeded by Mr. J H Payne, who became a staff member in 1902 and remained headmaster until his death, in 1917, during his service in the First World War. Mr. Payne acquired the building that the Jeppe Boys students currently occupy.

By 1912 the new school's grounds were insufficient for the accumulating number of pupils at the school. Due to the boys out-numbering the girls, and pressure from the Governing Body of the school, who were against the co-educational system of the school, it was decided that the girls would be moved to other premises.

Miss E L Cummins, the first headmistress of a Jeppe High School for Girls, joined the schools staff in 1904. She and Mr. Payne worked together on the planning of the new building. Mr. Payne did not live to see the construction of the building nor the separation of the boys from the girls. file after being housed by Fairview Primary school for the first six months of 1919, the Jeppe Girls moved into their new school building.

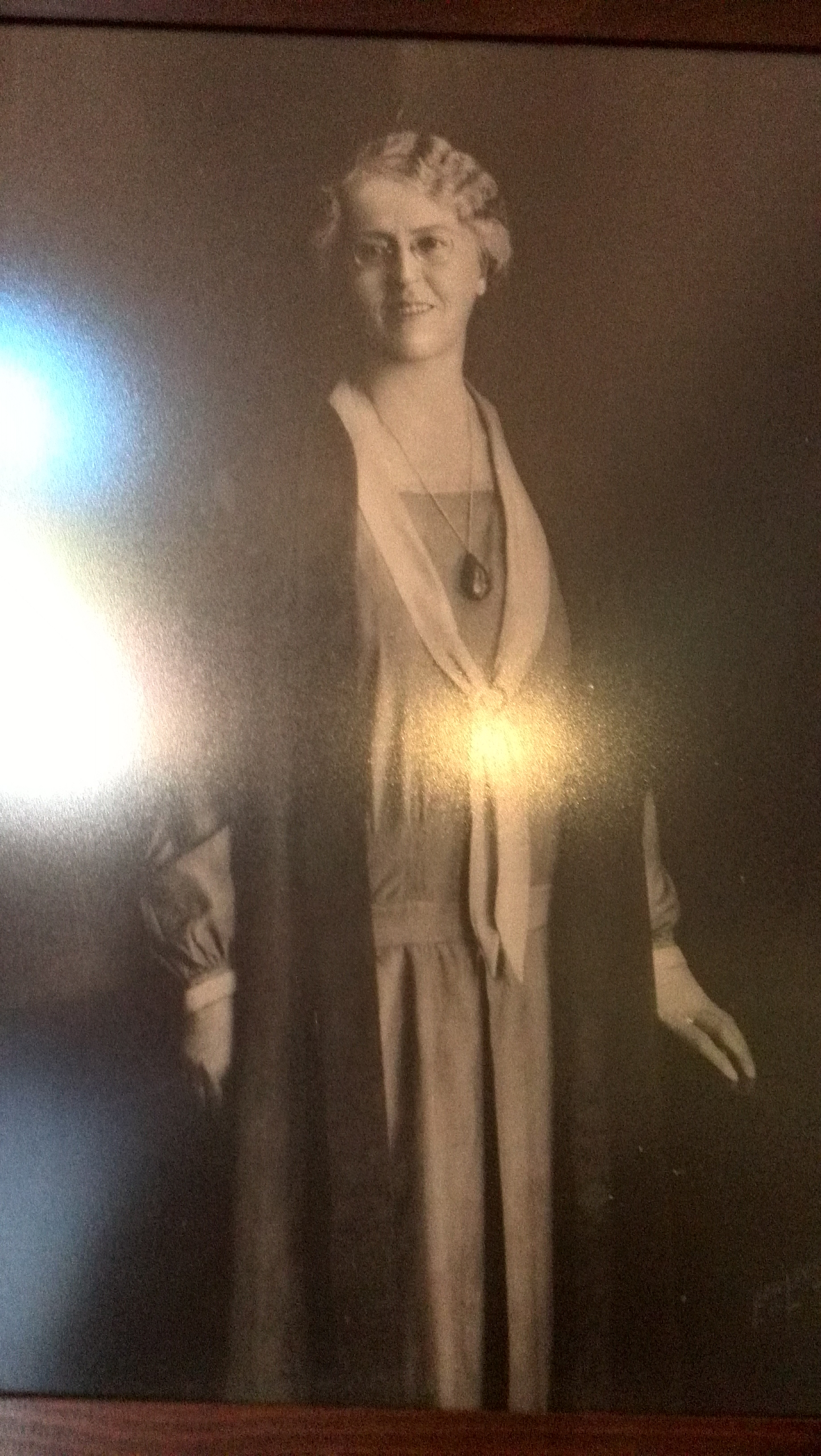
Ms E L Cummins

It was intended that the girls of the school would be boarders. Three plans of the school buildings included hostels, but these plans were never used.

In 1957, a new building was built on the east block which provided laboratories, geography and art rooms. In 1984-1986 new buildings were constructed south of the main buildings. These buildings provided additional laboratories and classrooms. The main building of the school was also renovated to provide a bigger library, six music classrooms and an audio-visual room. The authorities were prevented from giving the school all the financial aid that was promised, due to financial stringency. Therefore, the school used R180 000 from its own account to add to the new school block, and change a section of the new block into secretarial offices.

In 1991, a vote was taken by the parents of students at the school to allow girls of all races to attend the school. In this year Ms. Thompson was headmistress, and implemented this change in the third term of the school year.

== Headmistresses ==
Year	Principal
1919	Ellen L Cummins BA (Hons) Oxford
1931	Mary McLarty MA Durham
1946	Sylvia G Sprigg MBE BA (Wits)
1949	E Alice Ramsbottom BA
1957	Ailsa M Reid BSc
1974	Jean DE V Schutz BA
1991	Barbara JH Thompson
1997	Beckie R Tobias BA T.TED
2007	Helmien Slabber BA Ed, B Ed Hons, M Ed
2011	Dina Goncalves BSc.H.Dip.Ed

== Prominent Old Girls ==
- Phyllis Altman
- Johanna Alida Coetzee
- Ruth First
- Prof Isabel Hofmeyr
- Prof Elizabeth Rankin (née Moir)
- Lauren Robertson

== Buildings and facilities ==
The school is built from red brick, unlike the boys' school which is made from stone, to save money due to the war. Due to the war and a flu outbreak, a ceremony was not held for the laying of the foundation. The east wing was built up to a third story due to an increasing number of enrolments. In 1956, the far east wing was completed which included science laboratories and an art room. Prefab classrooms were used during the enlargement of the hall and no Flower Show was held that year due to construction in the hall. When the hall was completed in 1959, a Japanese Maple floor was added along with gold velvet curtains. The west quad includes two prefabs used for the Housecraft Centre.

The locker system was started in 1999 and followed the instalment of longer tuck-shop hours.

Jeppe Girls' facilities include a media centre, with a library which holds about 2000 books and a computer centre.. The sports facilities are located on the lower grounds across the road from the school.

These include: 6 tennis courts, 5 netball courts, 2 hockey/soccer fields, a cricket pitch and 2 volleyball courts.

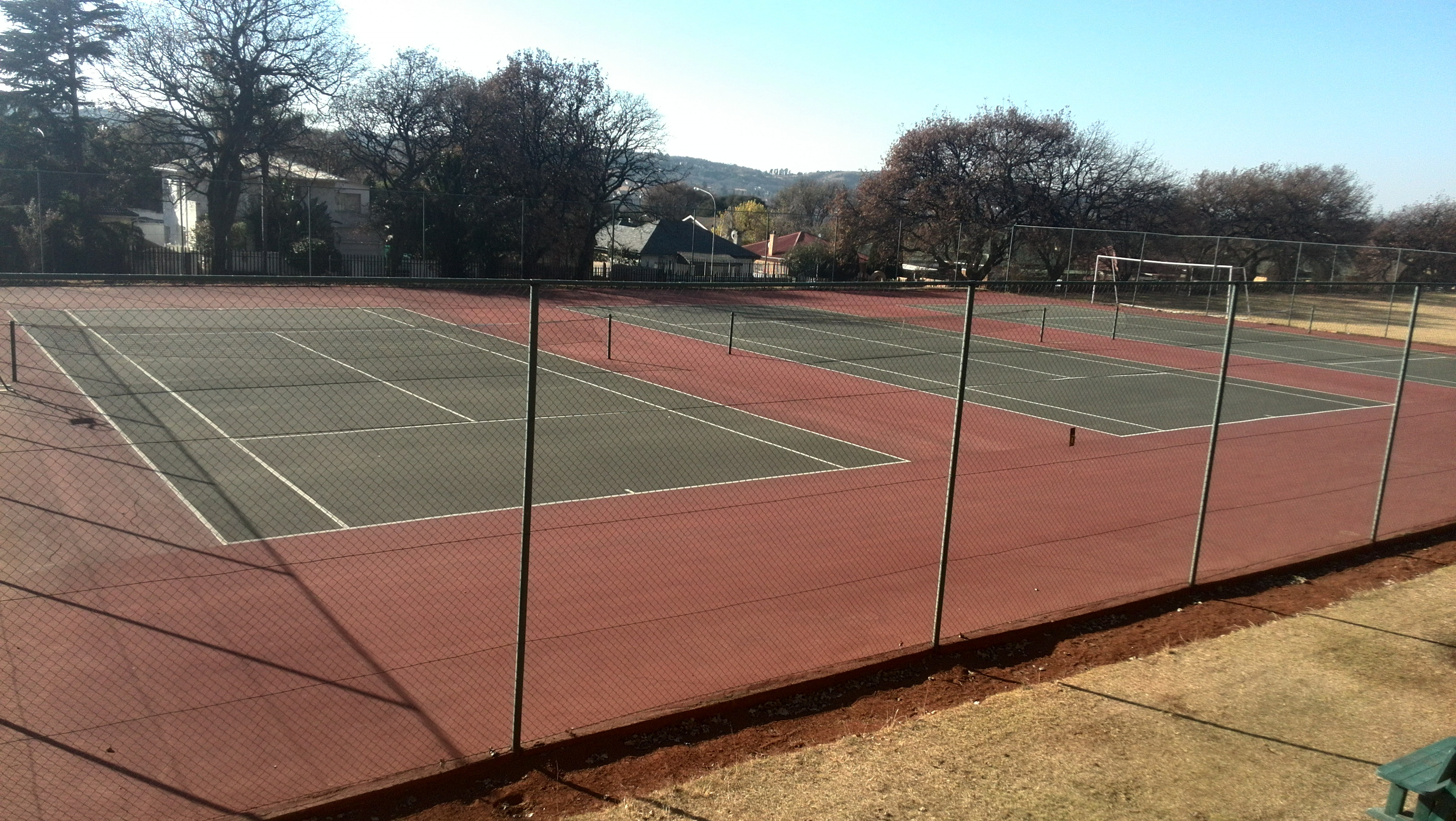
Tennis courts on the far left of the bottom grounds

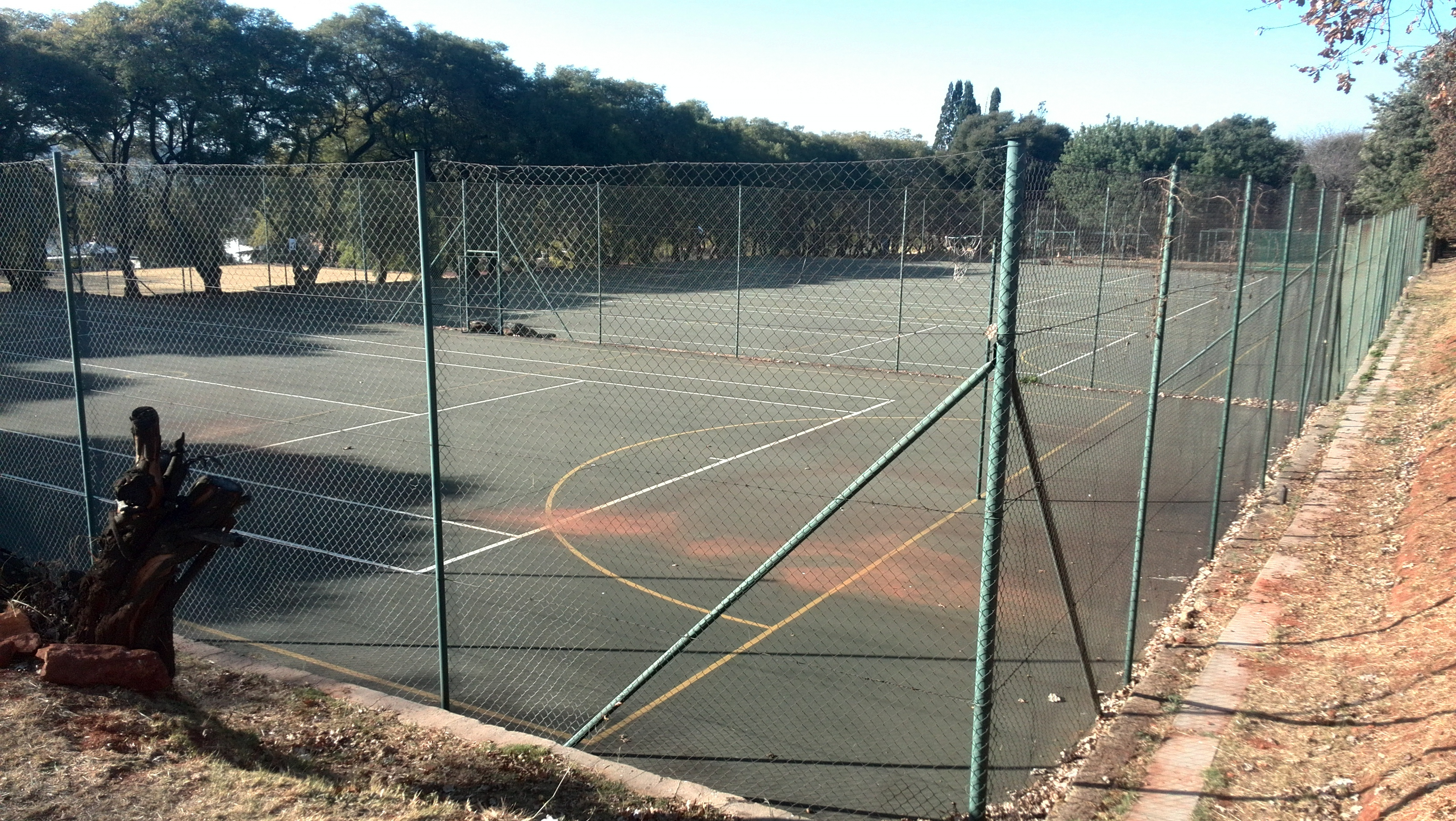
The netball courts

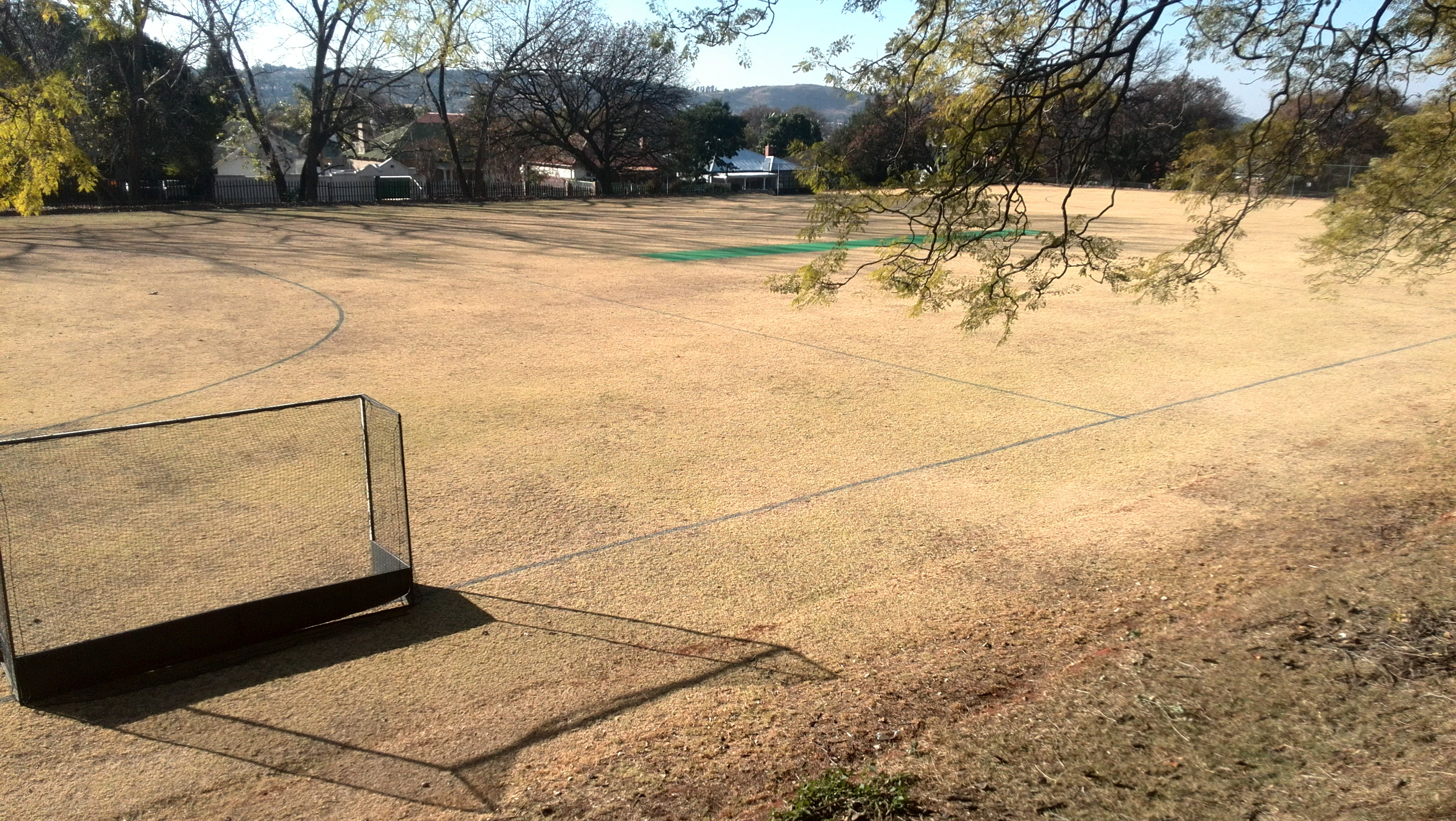
The bottom field on the lower grounds, on which the cricket pitch is situated

A new building was completed in 1987 to accommodate the growing number of pupils at the school and includes an extra 3 science laboratories. The new building is located behind the main building of the school.

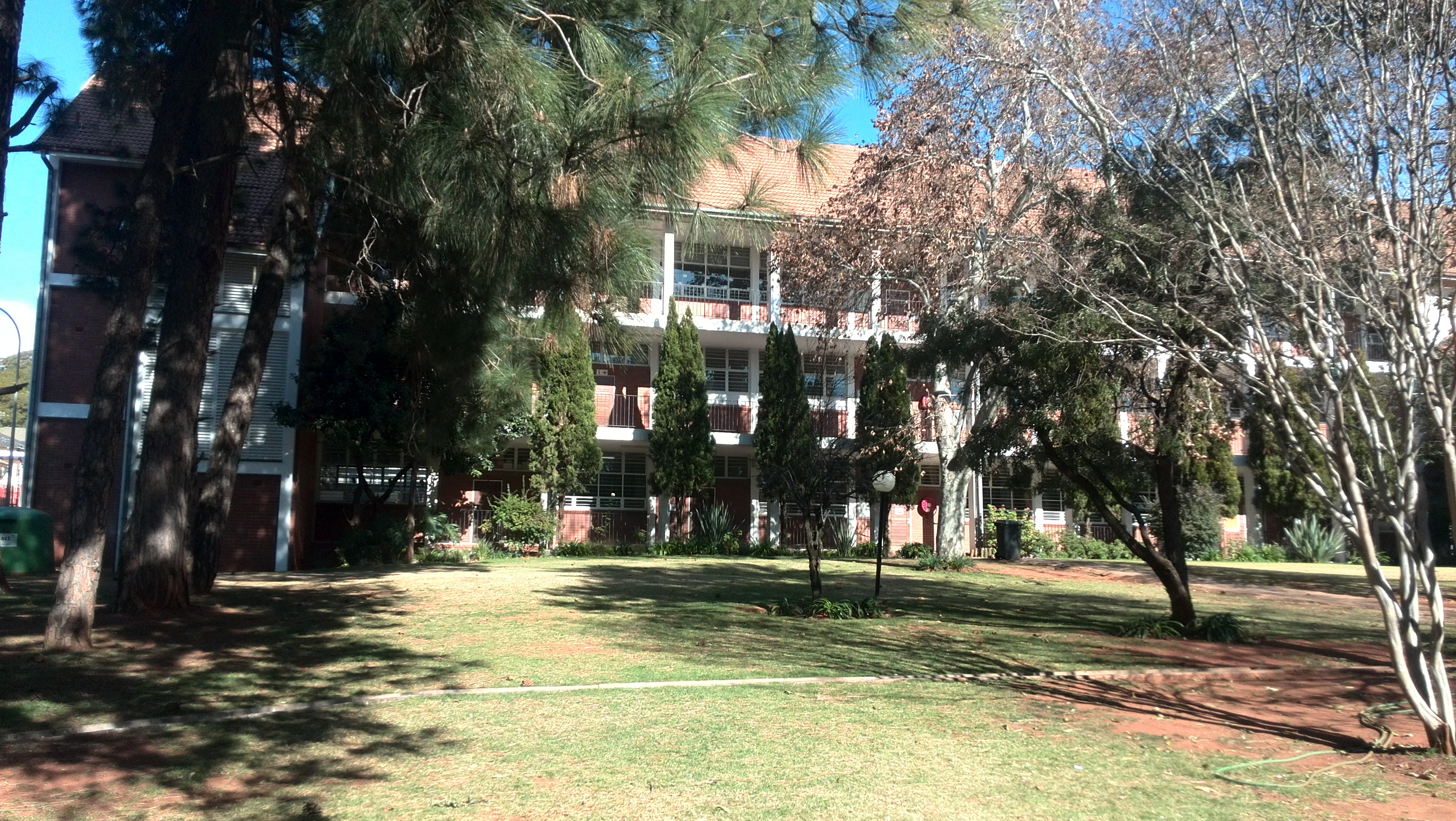
The new building with added facilities

Hostel

The Ross Arden Hostel was established in 1921 in Somerset Road with Miss Edwards as the Housemistress and assisted by Miss Smallman. The hostel could accommodate 33 girls when it was extended with a new wing in 1927. It moved to Roberts Avenue in 1933. When the hostel celebrated 20 years since its establishment, weekly boarders would be taken from 1942. The school made a donation to the Hope Home when the weekly boarders settled in. The hostel changed to strictly weekly boarders and no full-time boarders in 1945. Ross Arden Hostel closed in 1946 after 25 years when Miss Edwards decided to retire. The hostel was originally a temporary measure until two boarding houses were built on the lower sports grounds by the Education Department but these plans never materialised.

== Swimming pool history ==
In 1927, construction of the swimming bath began. The Government had brought in two dowsers to locate water so that water could be provided by sinking a borehole. 13 December 1929 saw the opening of the first swimming bath. The Seating around the pool was constructed in 1984, which is still present today. The swimming pool, 25m in length, is located on the school's main grounds. The pool is now inhabited by the pupils at the school during physical education lessons and during the swimming galas. The Jeppe Girls swimming pool is home to its very own swimming team coached by staff members. The team takes part in numerous events swum at home and away.

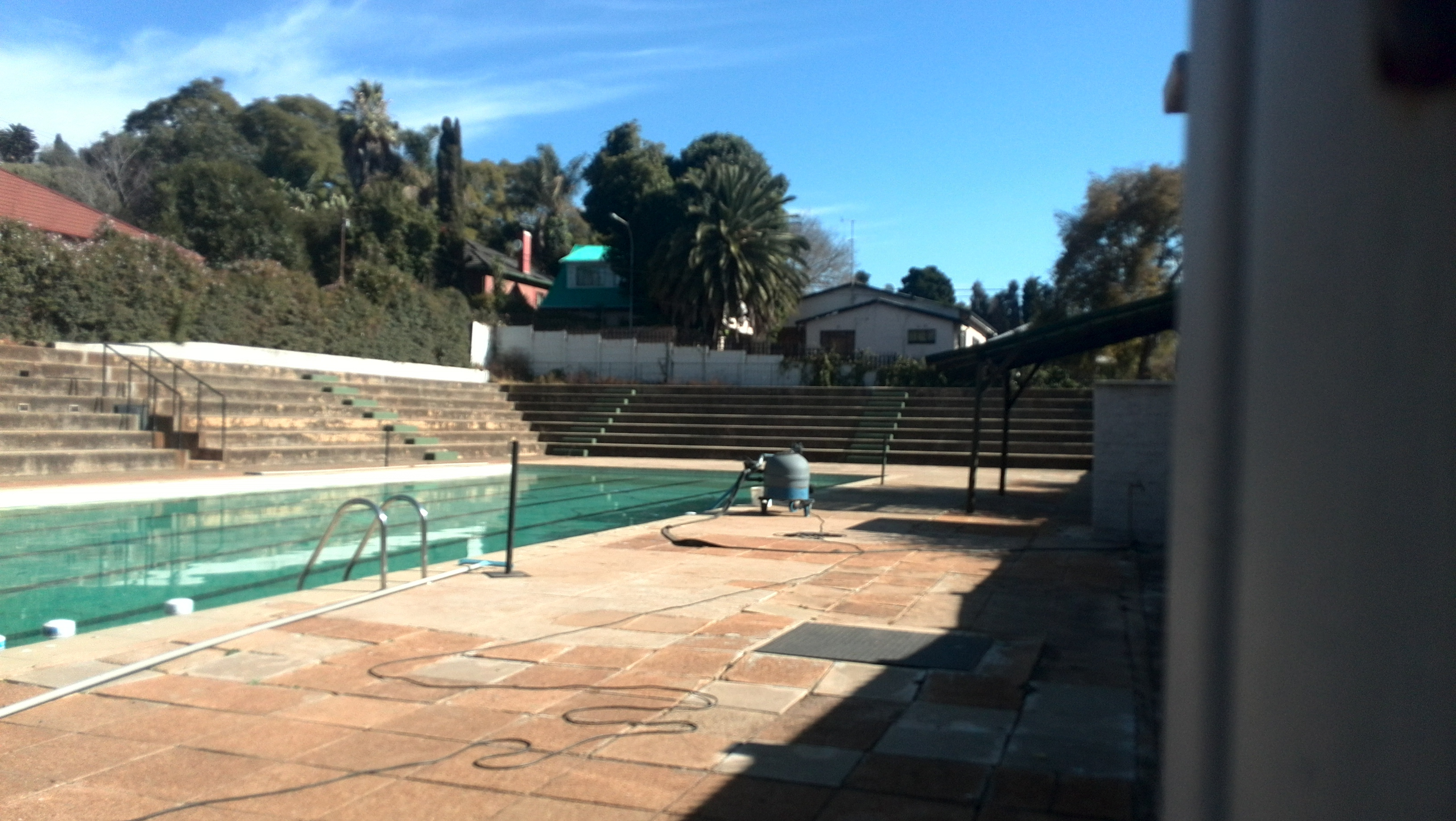
Swimming pool

== Academics ==
Jeppe Girls is a pilot school to write IEB exams which was allowed by the GDE Jeppe Girls has achieved a Matric pass rate of 100% for the 21st year in a row (in 2014).

== Subjects ==
The following subjects are offered at the school:

	Junior Phase (Grades 8 & 9)	Senior Phase (Grades 10 -12)
English	X	X
Advanced Programme English		X
Afrikaans	X	X
Mathematics	X	X
Mathematical Literacy		X
Advanced Programme Mathematics		X
Natural Science	X	
Life Science		X
Physical Science		X
SS (Social Sciences - History and Geography)	X	
History		X
Geography		X
Technology	X	
Design		X
Consumer studies		X
Life Orientation	X	X
Accounting		X
Economic and Management Sciences	X	
Music	X	X
Visual Art	X	X

== Research techniques ==
This subject was introduced when a member of the staff realised how greatly needed it was. Research techniques is one of the mandatory subjects at the Girls' school which equips the girls with essay writing skills, research skills, computer literacy as well as referencing skills. This subject equips the girls with skills needed for university and so this is an advantage to the girls.

== Scholarships ==
The Quondam Club was formed in 1907 by Jeppe Old Girls as a means to stay in contact. It was these Old Girls who made the first Scholarship or Bursary Fund for Jeppe High School.

Jeppe Girls is one of the schools partnered with SSP (Student Sponsorship Programme). The school is also partnered with the Old Mutual programme.

== Ruth First Scholarship ==
Honoring Ruth First, a prominent political activist in South Africa and a former student at the school, was an idea first thought of in 2008. This idea became a reality with the launch of The Ruth First Jeppe High School for Girls Memorial Trust in 2010 on 27 October. With the launch of the Ruth First Trust, ABSA donated R100K.

Patron

Justice Albie Sachs, who was a close friend of First's, is the Patron of the Trust.

Manager

Kevin Tait, a former Headmaster of Jeppe High School for Boys, Vice Rector of the Johannesburg College of Education, as well as Secretary of the Jeppe Schools' Trust is the Manager of the Ruth First Memorial Trust.

== School song ==
Where plants and flowers fair

With perfume scent the air,

Where hills in endless line

Inspire with thoughts sublime -

There stands amid her glorious trees

The Jeppe Girls' High School.

Forti Nihil Difficilius

This motto shall us rule.

So let us hymn her praise,

Take courage all our days.

We'll play the game and laud the name

Of Jeppe Girls' High School.

When we from memory's store,

Recall those days of yore,

Those contests keenly fought,

On fields or tennis court,

Then we shall hymn the glorious praise

Of Jeppe Girls' High School

Forti nihil difficilius

This motto shall us rule.

So let us ne'er despair,

Our burdens bravely bear.

We'll play the game

And laud the name

Of Jeppe Girls' High School.

The school song was written in 1927 by Headmistress Miss Dorothy Mackenzie, and was composed by Miss Smallman. It was sung for the first time in 1940 when Jeppe High School for girls celebrated its 21st birthday.

== Tradition ==
The school is known for its ongoing service to the school and community. The first tradition at the school was started when girls would donate eggs to the local Aged Women's Home every Friday. The girls also planned a tea for the Fairview Home. Donations to the War Memorial Fund were made by old girls to erect the War Memorial at the Boys' school. In 1946, a tradition of placing a fresh bowl of flowers on the Headmistress's table everyday was started by the Garden Club. A carol service to be held at the end of each year in November was created in 1970. This includes a dual performance by the Jeppe High School for Girls choir and students of Jeppe Girls who volunteer to be included in tableaux of the nativity play. These volunteers earn community service hours from their participation during the carol service.

Flower Show

The annual Flower Show, held in February, was started in 1929 and has grown extensively to this present date. The first prizes awarded were packets of seeds. Flowers were auctioned or donated to the Star Seaside Fund after the show. The flowers are now donated to hospitals and homes by the school. The Flower Show awarded the Bernard bullock cup for best arrangement, the Isabel Ritchie cup for Home Gardening and the Human Gardening cup in 1950. "1956 included an educational addition to the Flower Show was introduced with a new inter-house competition. Marks were awarded for the decoration of tables for the House parties... We came to understand the finer points of table arrangement and interest grew with each successive House gathering.", 0

Each girl in the school is encouraged to enter as many of the categories as possible. The juniors (Grade 8 & 9) and seniors (Grade 10-12) take part in different categories which take on various themes each year. A main category for the juniors is the Magnificent Monsters which are made out of fruit and vegetables. Judges include people who are connected to the school and those in the flower and garden business. Points are awarded to girls and are counted for their houses.

Houses

To celebrate Jeppe Girls becoming its own unit, the houses were named after flowers when the school opened in 1919 - Crassula (red), Disa (emerald green), Nerine (gold), Gerbera (pink), Harveya (orange), and Protea (royal blue). Two extra houses - Erica and Morae - were added in 1945 due to the increasing number of enrolment and to stabilise the quality of discipline and personal involvement, but had then returned to six houses in 1960 due to problems faced when participating in joint galas with the boys' school. The houses were also reversed to six due to a problem with lanes in swimming and athletics and has remained unchanged ever since.

Uniform

[The uniform is split into summer, winter and sports uniform accordingly. It is required for the girls to wear their blazer at all times regardless of the season change. The uniform is a part of the Jeppe Girls' tradition]

Motto and Badge

The badge consists of black and white waves with a gold bar in the middle. this represents the gold ore found in the Witwatersrand. The motto 'Forti Nihil Difficilius' meaning 'nothing is too difficult for the brave' or 'For the brave, nothing is too difficult' in Latin and was adopted in 1911.

== Quondam Club ==
The Jeppe Old Girls' Association is known as the Quondam Club (Latin for 'formerly' or 'once upon a time') and was established in 1907. A large piece of land was bought in Bedfordview for the new clubhouse. The project to build the clubhouse, in 1945, costed 15 000 pounds to include a hall, dressing rooms, secretary's office and a verandah with a view of the cricket oval. By 1947, the Quondam had 6 hockey fields and began to construct a recreational swimming pool. An Autumn Fair was held in 1949 and raised 3 000 pounds towards the construction of the clubhouse. The new headquarters of the clubhouse were opened on 24 September 1950.

Jeppe Quondam Club consisted of a Drama Society, Hockey, Tennis, and Swimming section including Waterpolo as well as a Cricket section started by the Old Girls. The Old Girls also had an annual reunion.

== Mother's Association ==
The Mother's Association has played a prominent part in the development of the school till today. The association was started in 1928 and many contributions have been made over the years.

The MA put together a cook book to raise funds in 1947 followed by a 'Polio Fete' in 1949. In 1958, they donated lockers to the school for the girls' books and possessions. They later donated R1000 in 1966 to help extend the swimming pool. 1970 saw the MA organise a mini walk and two dances. The main fundraiser for the year was to build a tea pavilion on the lower grounds. In 1975, R2000 was donated to upgrade fences around the tennis courts and 5 bursaries were granted. Flower pots and plants were bought for the entrance and courtyard to the school. A discothèque was also used for the first time at the MA dance. R2000 was used to improve the tennis court surfaces in 1979 and a similar amount was used to purchase new curtains for the hall.

The Mother's Association is now known as the Parent's Association.

== Extramural activities ==
Summer	Winter	Both
Aquatics (Swimming)	Cross Country	Chess
Cricket	Soccer	Deb
Tennis	Netball	Choir
Orienteering	Hockey	Public Speaking
Athletics		Mamela (Drumming)
		Marimba Beat
		J4J (Jeppe for Jesus)
		First Aid
		Equestrianism
		Hlabalela (Traditional choir)

Community Service

It is mandatory for junior girls (grades 8 and 9) to do community service at the end of the year after the final exams. This is to ensure that the girls give a helping hand to those in need of it, as a means of giving back to the community.

The girls are allowed to choose a place of their choice, where they will do a minimum of 30 hours in a week. The girls are required to prepare a presentation of the work they did and what stood out to them during this week the girls are required to bring certain documentation to show proof of their community work to show their educators and fellow learners. This will also enhance the girls' Curriculum Vitae.

Job Shadow

The senior (grades 10 and 11) girls are required to do a week of job shadow at an institute of their choice. This takes place at the end of the November final exams. A minimum of 30 hours as well as a presentation of the events of the week are required of the girls. Job shadowing is also a means of exposing the girls to different careers which results to their benefit.
