= Eduard Meine van Zinderen-Bakker =

Dutch-South African palynologist and ecologist

Eduard Meine van Zinderen Bakker (15 April 1907 Opsterland, Friesland – 19 March 2002 Somerset West) was a Dutch-born South African palynologist who made significant contributions to the fields of plant ecology, palynology and palaeo-ecology of Africa.

After obtaining a PhD in botany from the University of Amsterdam he taught biology in Apeldoorn. In 1947 he emigrated to South Africa with his wife and 2 sons. He served as the Netherlands' Honorary Consul for 20 years, an office for which he received the Order of Oranje-Nassau.

Initially appointed as lecturer in botany at the University of the Orange Free State in 1947, he stayed until 1972 and ended as Professor of the Department. The University established the Institute of Environmental Sciences and on his retirement appointed him as Director, a position he held until 1976, working with a staff of local and foreign scientists. From 1977 to 1988 he acted as Research Officer at the Institute until his retirement at age 81. During his time with the Institute he founded the journal "Palaeoecology of Africa" which he edited with Johanna Alida Coetzee and other guest editors for some 20 years.

The use of fossil pollen (palynology) to date the stratigraphy of Quaternary deposits, was one of his main interests. He introduced the discipline of palynology to South Africa in a 1951 article in the "South African Archaeological Bulletin". He stressed that global temperature variations were the primary cause of profound environmental changes, and that a study of fossil pollen would produce a wealth of information about palaeoenvironments. In this regard he worked at several sites in southern and eastern Africa with J. Desmond Clark, extending the scope of his research to include the Sahara and Namib deserts and the sub-Antarctic islands of Prince Edward and Marion. In 1965 he arranged the first major research expedition to these islands made up of an international team of 35 specialists who studied palynology, glacial geology, vulcanology, limnology, mineral cycling and bio-energetics. The results were published in a 1971 monograph.

He died at Somerset West in 2002 after a number of strokes.

== Achievements and awards ==
Professor van Zinderen Bakker served as Chairman of the International Group of Specialists in the Antarctic (SCAR), and President of the South African Society for Quaternary Research (SASQUA). He was a Fellow of the Royal Society of South Africa, an Honorary member of INQUA (International Union for Quaternary Research), the South African Association of Botanists, and the Deutsche Quartärvereinigung. He received a DSc. honoris causa from the University of the Orange Free State, the Gold Medal for South African Antarctic Research and for Botany, the Senior Captain Scott Medal for Biology, the Havenga Prize for Biology (1986) from the Suid-Afrikaanse Akademie vir Wetenskap en Kuns, President of the South African Archaeological Society between 1977 and 1979.

== Publications ==
- "South African pollen grains and spores" - Eduard Meine van Zinderen Bakker (1953)
- "Palaeoecology of Africa & of the surrounding islands & Antarctica" - Eduard Meine van Zinderen Bakker (Balkema, 1964)
- " Marion and Prince Edward Islands; report on the South African Biological & Geological Expedition/1965-1966" - Eduard Meine van Zinderen Bakker, J. M. Winterbottom, R. Allen Dyer
- "Effects of vanadium in the Canadian environment" - Eduard Meine van Zinderen Bakker (1980)
- "Investigations about the morphology and physiology of Physalospora cydoniae Arnaud" - (1934)
- "Het Naardermeer; een geologische, historische en botanische landschapsbeschrijving van Nederlands oudste natuurmonument" - Eduard Meine van Zinderen Bakker (1942)
- "De West-Nederlandsche veenplassen; een geologische, historische en biologische landschapsbeschrijving van het water- en moerasland" - Eduard Meine van Zinderen Bakker (1947)
- "Ecological investigations on ravine forests of the Eastern Orange Free State : South Africa" - Eduard Meine van Zinderen Bakker (1971)
- "Reminiscences of biological travels in Africa and to South Polar Islands" - Eduard Meine van Zinderen Bakker (1993)
- "Intimations on quarternary [sic] palaeoecology of Africa" - Eduard Meine van Zinderen Bakker (1969)
