= Hein Odendaal =

- Born: July 17, 1942 (age 83)
- Occupations: Specialist in Obstetrics and Gynaecology
- Children: 2

Hein Odendaal (born 17 July 1942) is a South African medical doctor and internationally recognised specialist in Obstetrics and Gynaecology.

== Biography ==
A graduate of the University of Pretoria and the University of Stellenbosch, Odendaal returned to Stellenbosch in 1983 as Professor and Head of the Department of Obstetrics and Gynaecology, a position he held for 20 years. He also served as visiting professor in the Department of Obstetrics and Gynaecology at the Catholic University of Louvain in Belgium, and as coordinator of Obstetric Services in the Western Cape, South Africa in 2003.

He has served as an external examiner for undergraduate and postgraduate examinations at, inter alia, the University of Malawi and the University of Addis Ababa, Ethiopia. Prof Odendaal has contributed to 236 scientific publications, has delivered papers at more than 200 congresses around the world, and is the author of five medical books.

== Education ==
Odendaal graduated from the University of Pretoria in 1966 with a M.B. Ch.B. and from the University of Stellenbosch with a M. Med. (Obstetrics and Gynaecology)(cum laude). He is a Fellow of the Royal College of Obstetricians and Gynaecologists.

== Memberships ==
A former President of the College of Obstetricians and Gynaecologists, College of Medicine of South Africa, Odendaal served on the Council of the World Obstetric Medicine Group from 2002. He was a member of the International Society for the Study of Hypertension in Pregnancy, and the International Federation of Gynaecology and Obstetrics' Advisory Panel on Maternal and Perinatal Health and Obstetrics from 2001 to 2003.

== Awards and accolades ==
Odendaal is the recipient of, inter alia, the Havenga Prize for Medicine (1997), a Distinguished Reviewer Award from the South African Medical Journal, and the Rector’s award for excellent research from the University of Stellenbosch. He has a National Research Foundation of South Africa rating as an established researcher with a sustained recent record of productivity recognised by his peers, and in 2009 was awarded an honorary membership of the SA College of Obstetricians and Gynecologists.
