= Kenya Mountain =

1929 book by E. A. T. Dutton

- Title pages
- Author: E. A. T. Dutton
- Illustrator: J.D. Melhuish
- Language: English
- Subject: Mount Kenya
- Publisher: Jonathan Cape
- Publication date: 1929
- Publication place: United Kingdom
- Media type: Hardcover
- Pages: 218 pp.

Kenya Mountain is a non-fiction book written by E. A. T. Dutton about his trip up Mount Kenya in 1926. The original book was published in 1929 by Jonathan Cape in London, and contains a preface by Dutton and an introduction by Hilaire Belloc. There is also a fold out map of the route taken by Melhuish and Dutton in 1926.

== Overview ==
Kenya Mountain documents the expedition of Melhuish and Dutton in 1926 up Mount Kenya. It starts at their departure from Nairobi in February. They make their way to Chogoria, at the base of the mountain, where they met the rest of their party and hired Mwimbi porters. On the first day they climbed through the forest to the lower regions of the bamboo zone, then continued fighting through the bamboo to the moorlands above.

At the moorlands the party split, with some remaining at this altitude to study plants. The rest continued higher, to their next camp at Hall Tarns where they ate the sheep they had brought up. The next day the party split again, with most of the porters staying at a lower altitude and climbing every day to the higher camp to bring firewood. Melhuish, Dutton and the rest of their porters struggled up the scree to reach the Curling Pond where a new hut had been built.

For the afternoon of the first day, Melhuish and then Dutton went on reconnaissance trips across the Lewis Glacier and nearby snowfields. They, and the Curling Pond, had changed significantly from their previous expedition in 1924. The following morning Melhuish went skating on the Curling Pond, much to the delight of the porters who had never seen "a white man dancing with knives on his feet". They then set off to ascend Point Lenana, taking with them the first six Africans to ascend the peak.

One morning the expedition awoke to find a new pond at the doorway to the hut, fed by the Lewis Glacier and the Curling Pond. This caused the porters to become uneasy, as there were local superstitions about the mountain. They believed they were trespassing on the mountain and their God, Ngai, had sent this as a warning to them. The following day Dutton and Melhuish set off to climb to the summit of Batian, accompanied by several porters, but gave up after several hours as they could not find a way up. After attempting to climb a slab, one porter said "there may be a way up, but there is no way down".

The following day they made another attempt on the summit. They reached the point that Arthur had reached, marked by a flag tied to a stick, before giving up. On their return to camp they had a snowball fight before packing up to return to the lower camp.

On the way down the mountain, the party visited the Nithi Falls, now called The Gates after the gorge of the Nithi River, before returning through the forest to Chogoria.
