= Arthur Herbert Firmin =

British-Kenyan mountaineer (1912–1955)

- Born: 6 January 1912; Nairobi, East Africa Protectorate
- Died: 28 May 1955 (aged 43); Deurali, Gandaki Province, Kingdom of Nepal
- Burial place: Pokhara, Gandaki Province, Kingdom of Nepal
- Occupations: Mountaineer; photographer; police officer
- Spouse: Kathleen Firmin (née Barry) (m. 1940)

Arthur Herbert Firmin (6 January 1912 – 28 May 1955) was a British–Kenyan mountaineer, photographer, and police officer.

== Early life and education ==
Firmin was born on 6 January 1912 in Nairobi, East Africa Protectorate (present-day Kenya), to Elizabeth Jane Firmin (née Isherwood) and Frederick John Firmin, an accountant. Both of Firmin's parents were English.

Firmin was educated in England, returning to British Kenya in 1937.

== Career ==
In 1937, Firmin joined the Kenya Police. During World War II, he worked as an official photographer for the police. In 1946, when the police did not create a special role for his photography skills, he left and started his own photography business in Nairobi with his wife, Kathleen Barry, who was also a fine mountaineer and made an ascent the main peaks of Mt Kenya and also Alexandra, the highest point in the Ruwenzoris with him. He became well known for his mountain, wildlife, and portrait photography.

=== Mountaineering ===
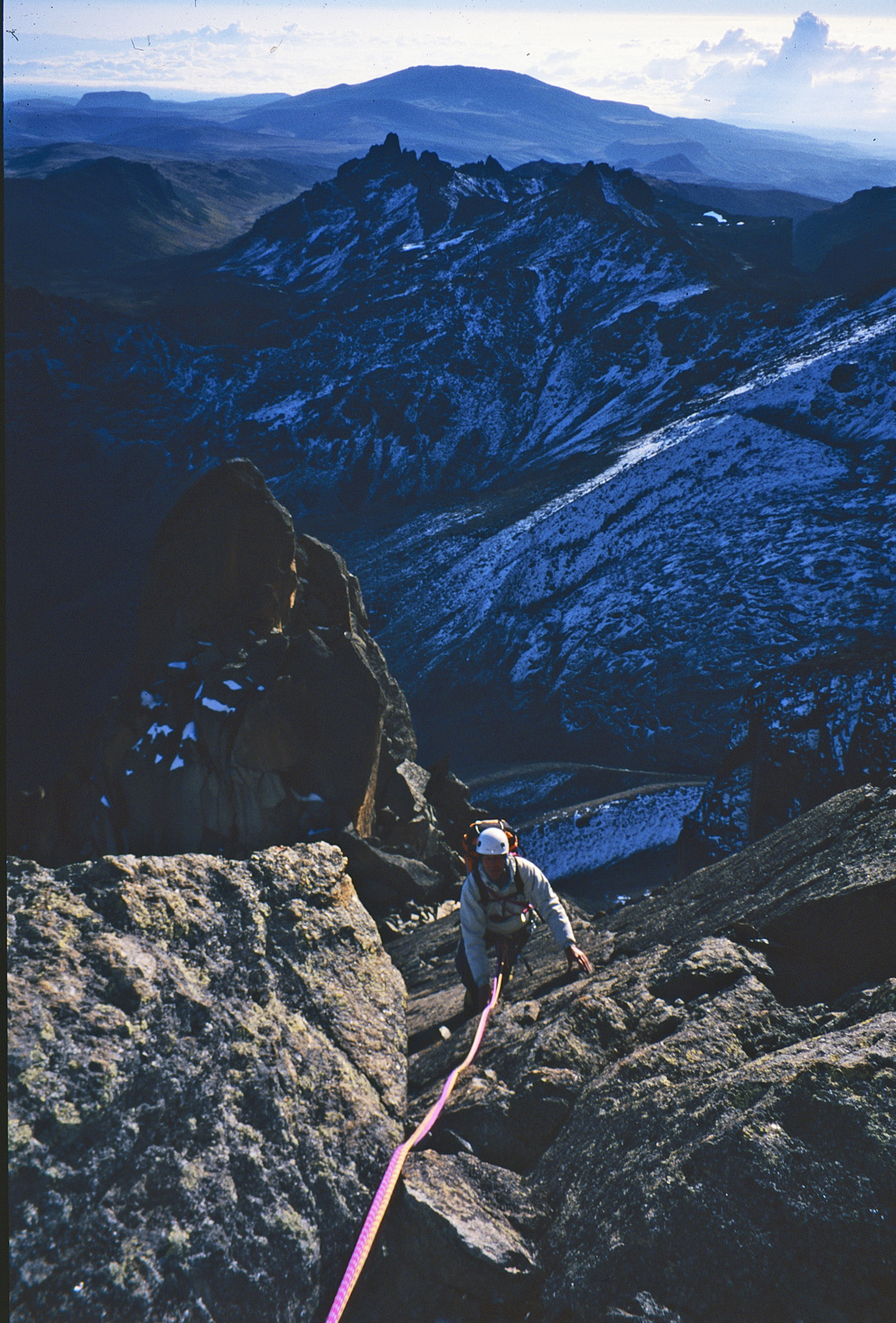
Climbers above the Firmin Tower on the North Face Standard Route on Mt. Kenya.

Firmin was familiar with British hills and had spent 10 days climbing in Switzerland in 1951, when he climbed the Matterhorn.

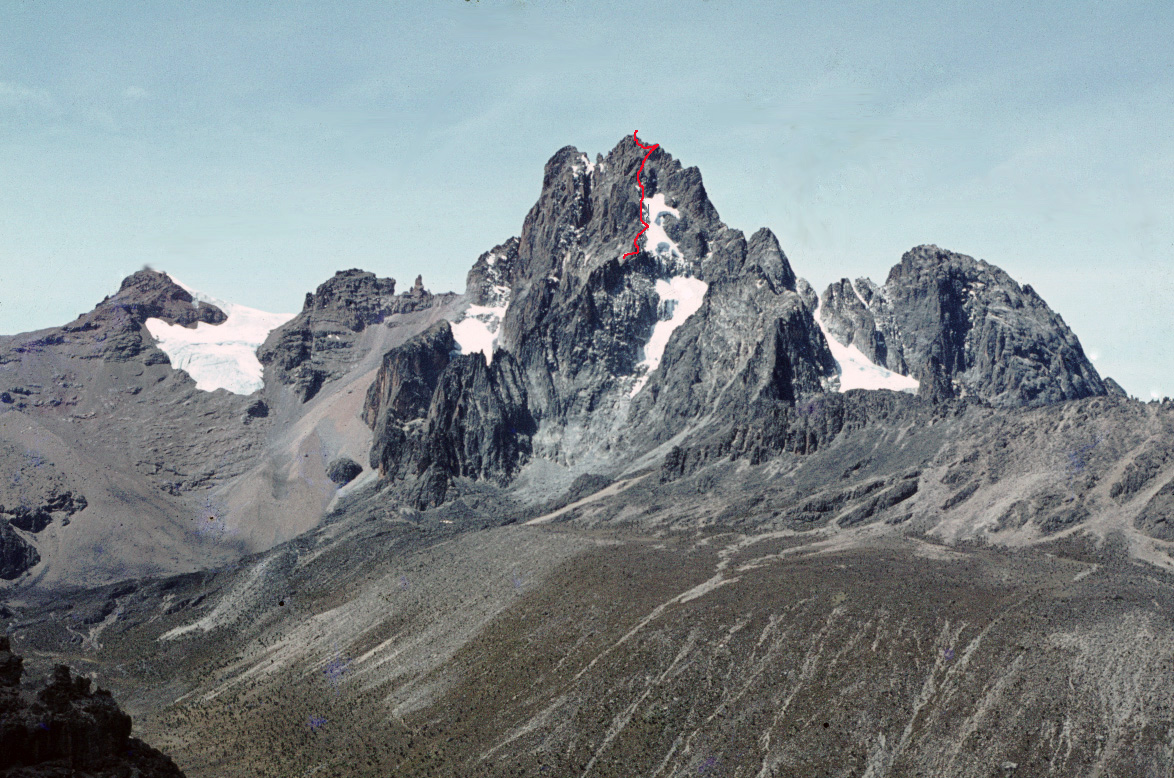
North Side of Mt. Kenya showing the approximate line of the Firmin–Hicks route.

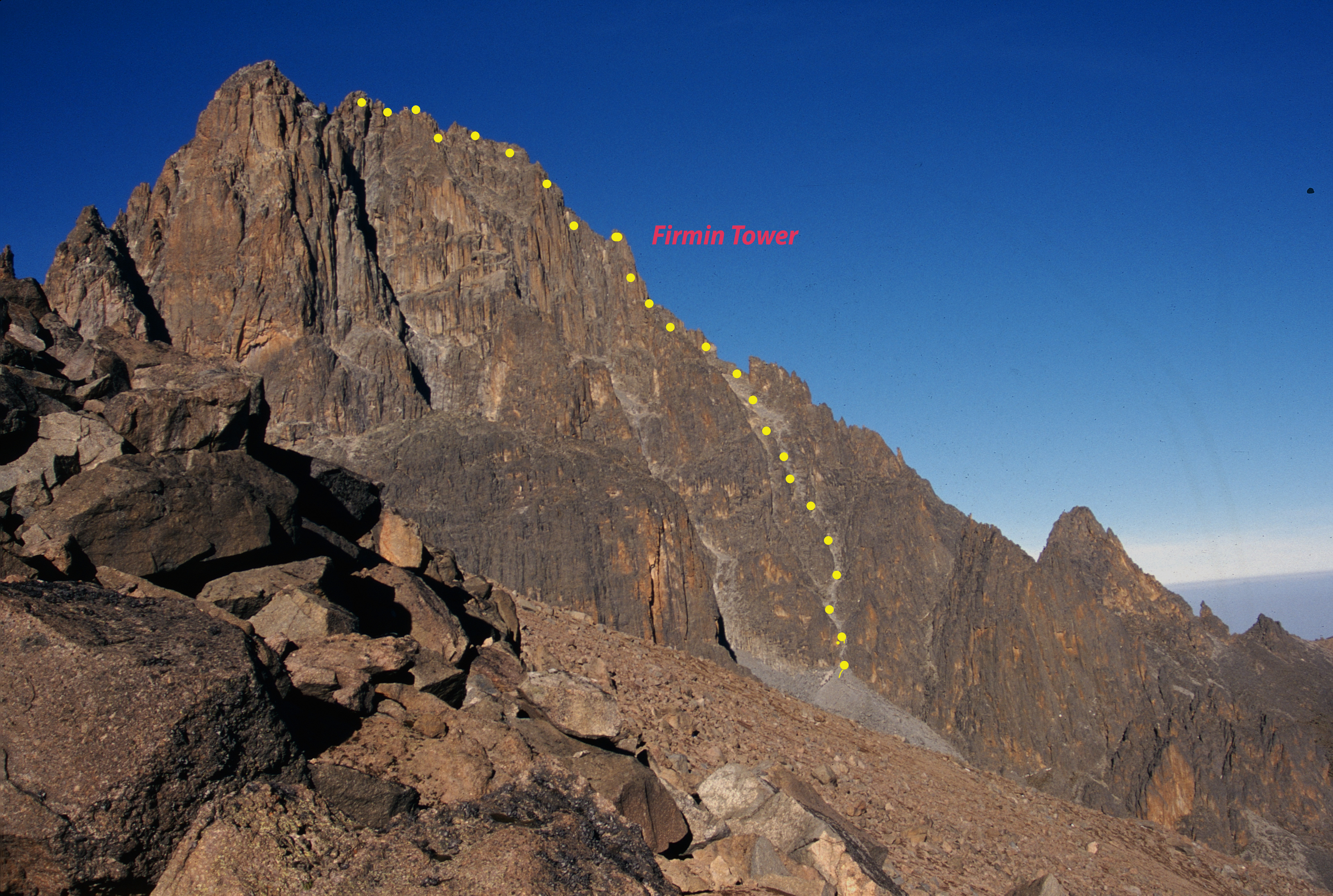
Approximate line of Firmin–Hicks route to Batian, Mt. Kenya.

In the eighteen years following his return to Kenya, Firmin carried out exploratory climbing. He made significant first ascents on Mount Kenya, Mount Kilimanjaro, and in the Rwenzori Mountains. His 1944 ascent of the North Face of Mount Kenya with Peter Hicks was the first climb on that part of the mountain and became the North Face Standard Route, commonly called the Firmin–Hicks. The crux of this climb is called the Firmin Tower.

The length of the route makes it difficult to ascend and descend within the same day. It is graded Kenya grade 4 or alpine grade D to TD. There had been previous attempts to climb Batian from the North. Prior to their successful first ascent of the Normal Route over Nelion to Batian in 1929 Eric Shipton and Percy Wyn Harris attempted to climb the North East Buttress of Batian, somewhere in the vicinity of the Firmin-Hicks, but had to retreat. In 1943 escaped and undernourished prisoners of war, Felice Benuzzi and Dr Giovanni (Giuãn) Balletto, failed to climb the ridge to the west above Point Peter but two days later they climbed Point Lenana, leaving a homemade Italian flag. A week later the flag was removed by Arthur Firmin and companions. In January 1946, with John Howard, Firmin made the first ascent of the South Face of Batian via its South West Ridge (Kenya grade 4), thus becoming the first climber to climb both the North and South faces of the mountain.

This was followed in February 1950 by his ascent of the South Face Route with J.S. Bagenal. Once regarded as the easiest route to the main summit, possibly

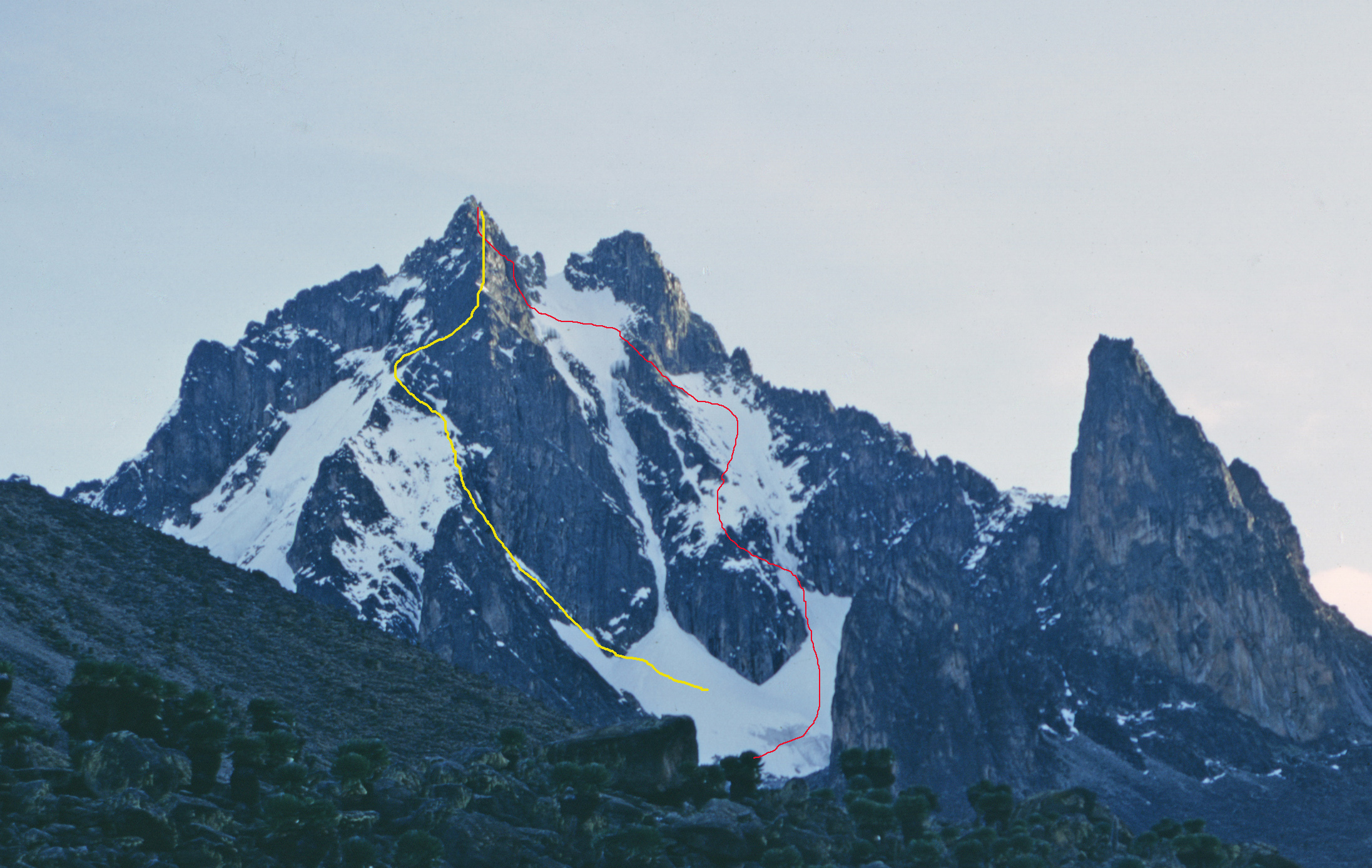
South Face shown in red. SW Ridge shown in yellow. Located on Mt. Kenya.

grade 2 or 3, it has been rendered unjustifiably dangerous by climate change and the disappearance of the icefields. In 1948, Firmin made the second ascent of the Shipton–Tilman West Ridge route (grade 5), descending by his own route on the North face.

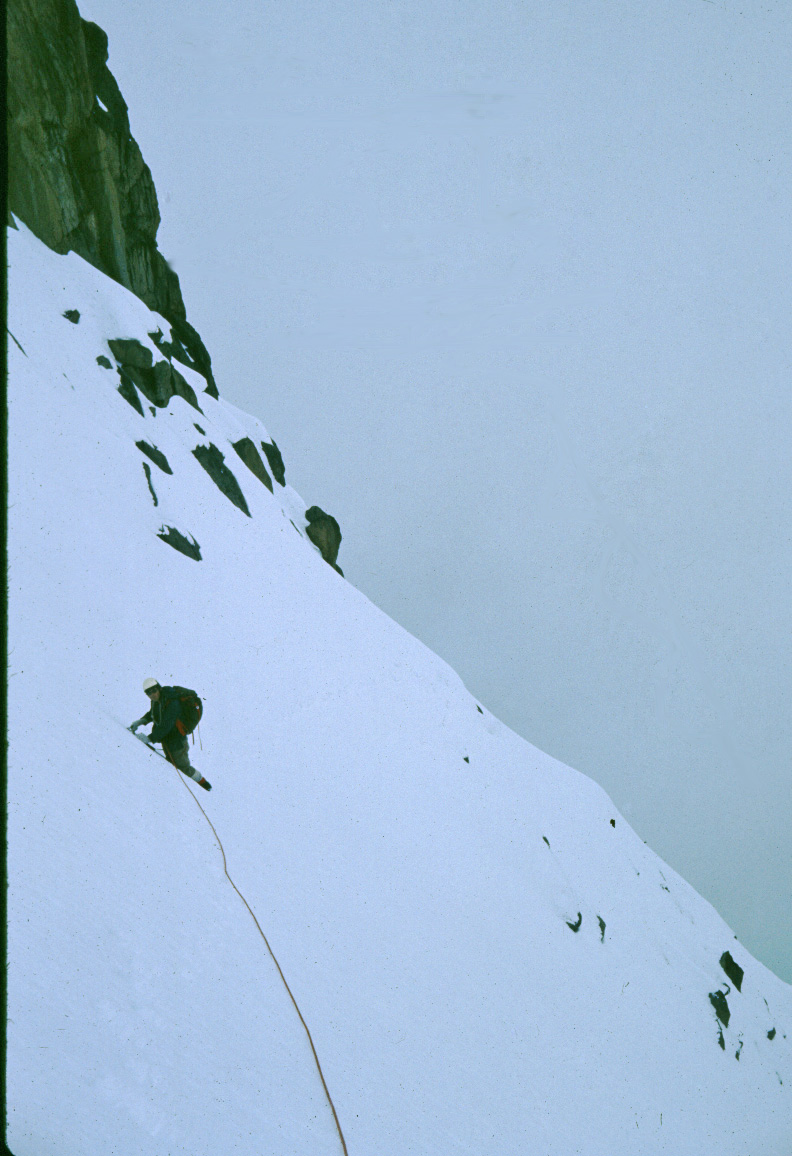
Firmin's South Face Route on Mt. Kenya.

Firmin made numerous ascents of Kilimanjaro, once camping for a week in the crater.

He was attracted to Kibo's outlier, Mawenzi. In 1954, he climbed what is now known as the Firmin Route from the West with D.N. Sampson (grade 4). He also explored the East Face with J.W. Howard and others. Firmin climbed all the main peaks of the Ruwenzori in Uganda other than Margherita, also making first ascents. With D. Busk, he investigated discrepancies in the maps of Stanley Peak and discovered that there were two peaks and another glacier. These were then named Elizabeth, Philip, and Coronation Peak. Firmin initiated rock climbing at the now popular Lukenya crag, 45 minutes from Nairobi on the Mombasa road, with his ascent of Arthur's Horror with Evelyn Baring in 1936. Baring became Governor of Kenya during the Mau Mau uprising. Kisoi Munyao, the first Kenyan African to climb Batian, worked for the Firmins as a cook and then in the photographers' studio.

== Death ==
During a private expedition on Himalchuli, Firmin's left thigh was broken by a falling rock. Following a descent down Himalchuli and a lower range of the Himalayas to Sisaghat Bazar, Firmin died on 28 May 1955 near the village of Deurali. He was buried at Pokhara.

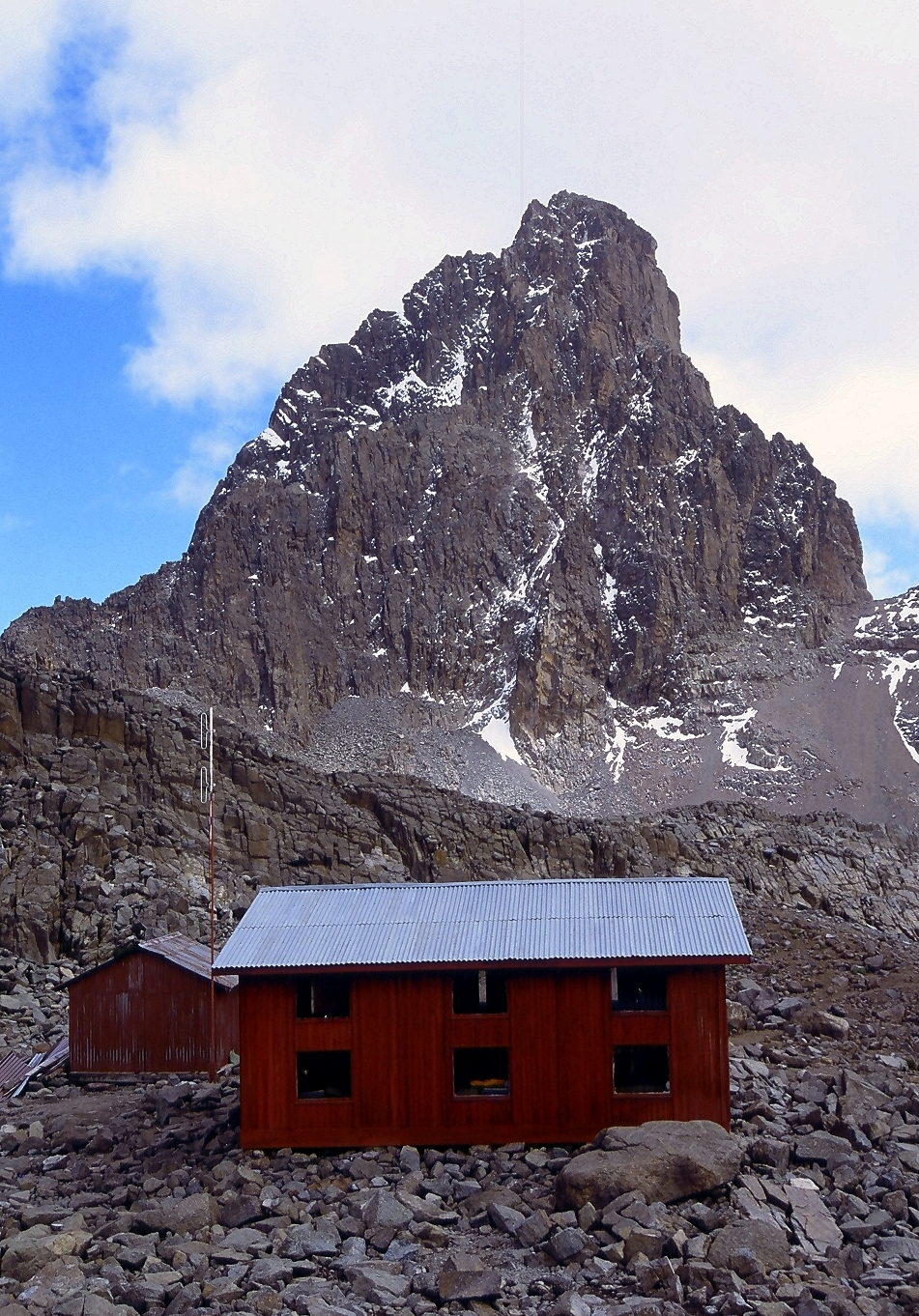
Mt. Kenya Austrian Hut with Nelion Peak behind.

=== Commemoration ===
In 1959, the Arthur Firmin Memorial Hut was erected at 4,790 m beside the old top hut to the east of the Lewis Glacier. It was conveniently placed for ascents of the standard route on Nelion and Batian and of Point Lenana. It was burnt down in 1972 and replaced in 1973 with the Austrian Hut, the money having been donated from Austria in recognition of the role of Kenya climbers in the rescue of Dr. Gert Judmaier, who was injured high on the Firmin–Hicks route. One room in the hut is named the Firmin Room.

== Personal life ==
In 1940, Firmin married Kathleen Firmin (née Barry; 1910–1993) in Nairobi. Kathleen is buried near Nanyuki, Kenya.
