= Afrikaans literature =

Afrikaans literature is literature written in Afrikaans. Afrikaans is the daughter language of 17th-century Dutch and is spoken by the majority of people in the Western Cape of South Africa and among Afrikaners and Coloured South Africans in other parts of South Africa, Namibia, Zimbabwe, Botswana, Lesotho and Eswatini. Afrikaans was historically one of the two official languages of South Africa, the other being English, but it currently shares the status of an "official language" with ten other languages.

Such was the opposition of the Afrikaner intelligentsia to the White Supremacist National Party and to Apartheid that, in an interview later in his life, Afrikaner poet Uys Krige said, "One of the biggest mistakes is to identify the Afrikaans language with the Nationalist Party."

Other important Afrikaans poets and authors are André P. Brink, Ingrid Jonker, Eugène Marais, Marie Linde, N. P. van Wyk Louw, Deon Meyer, Dalene Matthee, Hennie Aucamp, Bonaventure Hinwood, and Joan Hambidge.

== History ==
=== Prestandardisation ===
Afrikaans can claim the same literary roots as contemporary Dutch, as both languages stem from 17th-century Dutch. One of the oldest examples of written Cape Dutch is the poem Lied ter eere van de Swellendamsche en diverse andere helden bij de bloedige actie aan Muizenberg in dato 7 August 1795 (Song in Honour of the Swellendam and various others Heroes at the Bloody Action at Muizenberg) while the earliest Afrikaans publications are generally believed to be Zamenspraak tusschen Klaas Waarzegger en Jan Twyfelaar (Conversations between Klaas Waarzegger and Jan Twyfelaar) by L.H. Meurant in 1861 and Uiteensetting van die godsdiens (Exposition of the Religion) by Abu Bakr Effendi in Arabic Afrikaans in 1877.

=== Resisting anglicisation ===
Even though the roots of the Afrikaans language movement date from 1875, the movement did not spread in a major way until after the Treaty of Vereeniging in 1902.

According to literary historian Jack Cope, the first literary works in Afrikaans were born out of the despondent atmosphere that followed the defeat of the two Boer Republics and the systematic British war crimes of the Second Anglo-Boer War. For this reason, the first Afrikaans writers and poets were considered heroes for defending their people, language, and culture against efforts by the British Empire to destroy all three.

Sir Alfred Milner, the Royal Governor of the newly formed Union of South Africa, launched an effort to use both the government and the educational system to force the Afrikaners and Coloured people to switch to English. In response, Afrikaans was standardized as a language and was first used in a standard form in memoirs written by Boer men and women about their experiences in the war. Furthermore, Milner's coercive Anglicization campaign significantly backfired and instead mobilized the Afrikaners to take back control of both the government and the educational system.

Eugène Marais, a morphine addicted poet, scientist, and former journalist whose newspaper criticisms of President Paul Kruger had made him a highly unpopular figure in the Republic of Transvaal, switched from writing in English and Dutch to in Afrikaans during the era that followed the British defeat of the Boer Commandos. As the leader of the Second Afrikaans Language Movement, Marais's work was translated into various languages either late in his life or after his death.

From 1905 Marais studied nature in the Waterberg ('Water Mountain'), a wilderness area north of Pretoria, and wrote in his native Afrikaans about the animals he observed. His studies of termites led him to conclude that a termite colony ought to be considered a single organism, a prescient insight that predated the elaboration of this idea by Richard Dawkins. Also in the Waterberg, Marais also studied the black mamba, spitting cobra and puff adder. Moreover, he observed a specific troop of baboons at length, and from these studies there sprang numerous magazine articles and the books My Friends the Baboons and The Soul of the Ape. He is acknowledged as the father of the scientific study of the behaviour of animals, known as Ethology.

As a moderate believer in Afrikaner nationalism, Marais' literary output was heavily influenced by, "the pure poetry," he learned through his friendships with local San people, Nama people, Khoi people, and from Herero refugees from the recent uprising and subsequent genocide in German Southwest Africa. Marais also collected a very large store of African folklore in the Waterberg District from an elderly San storyteller locally nicknamed Ou Hendrick and published his stories in Afrikaans under the title Dwaalstories ("Wandering Stories").

Several years before his death, Rev. A.J. Louw, an Afrikaner Calvinist Dominee known as "The Pope of the Highveld", confronted Marais during a haus bezoek, or ministerial visitation, for believing in Darwinian evolution. Marais replied, "Don't pick on me, Dominee. It's a matter between you and the Almighty. I really had nothing to do with the creation of the Universe."

One of Marais' last poems, Diep Rivier ("Deep River"), is an ode to the drug morphine and was written ten years before its author's death by his own hand in 1936.

The first female poet in Afrikaans to be published was Sarah Goldblatt in 1921, followed by Elisabeth Eybers in 1936, and Olga Kirsch in 1944. In 1925, they were joined by novelist Marie Linde, who wrote Onder bevoorregte mense.

However, as extreme Afrikaner nationalists took control of the political process in the 1920s and the decades that followed, poets and authors writing in Afrikaans became some of the most vocal opponents of both the ruling National Party and its White Supremacist policy of Apartheid.

One of the first Afrikaner literati to oppose the National Party was Uys Krige, who first became known as one of the Dertigers ("The Writers of the Thirties"). Krige's opposition to the National Party went back to the Spanish Civil War, when he campaigned passionately for the Republican side. In 1937, Krige wrote the Afrikaans poem, Lied van die fascistiese bomwerpers ("Hymn of the Fascist Bombers"). Krige later recalled, "I needed only a line or two, then the poem wrote itself. My hand could hardly keep pace. I did not have to correct anything. Well... that seldom happens to you." The poem condemned the bombing raids by pro-Nationalist German and Italian pilots. Inspired, according to Jack Cope, by Krige's upbringing within Afrikaner Calvinism and its polemics against an allegedly corrupt Pre-Reformation Church, Lied van die fascistiese bomwerpers also leveled savage attacks against Roman Catholicism.

According to Jack Cope, "The poem starts on a note of military pride – the eyes of the Fascist pilots fixed on themselves in their joyful and triumphant, their holy task. The tone of bitter irony rises as the pace becomes faster, climbing to height after height of savagery and contempt. The lines of the Latin liturgy become mixed with the brutal exultation of the mercenaries raining down death from their safe altitude. The Bible itself is rolled in the blood. The lovely place-names of Spain rise in gleams above the dust and smoke. In the end the hymn becomes an insane scream of violence and bloody destruction mocking even the Crucifixion."

As no Afrikaans literary journal dared to publish it, Uys Krige's Lied van die fascistiese bomwerpers appeared in the Forum, a left-leaning literary journal published in English. Krige's poem elicited vehement condemnations from both extreme Afrikaner nationalists and from the Catholic Church in South Africa, which "protested vehemently" and called Krige's poem sacrilegious. Krige responded by asking whether South African Catholics approved of the destruction of what he considered the lawful Spanish Government or in the ongoing White Terror by the Nationalist side.

According to Jack Cope, Krige's linguistic and literary talent combined with his passion for modern French, Spanish, Italian and Portuguese literature made him the principal translator from Romance languages into Afrikaans during the 20th century. Krige has therefore had a considerable influence on all subsequent Afrikaans literature.

Uys Krige translated many of the works of William Shakespeare from Elizabethan English into Afrikaans. He also translated works by Federico García Lorca, Pablo Neruda, Lope de Vega and Juan Ramón Jiménez from Spanish, works by Baudelaire, François Villon, Jacques Prévert, Arthur Rimbaud, and Paul Éluard from French, and the poems of Salvatore Quasimodo and Giuseppe Ungaretti from Italian.

Krige's electrifying encounter with Latin American poetry whilst stationed with the South African Army in Cairo during World War II also led him to translate the poetry of Jacinto Fombona-Pachano, Jose Ramon Heredia, Vicente Huidobro, Jorge Carrera Andrade, Nicolas Guillen, Cesar Vallejo, Jorge de Lima and Manuel Bandeira into Afrikaans from both Spanish and Portuguese.

=== The adversary within ===
During the 1948–1994 rule of the National Party, however, the Afrikaner intelligentsia formed one of the strongest forces in opposition to the ruling Party, and the most acclaimed Afrikaans authors openly criticized the government's domestic and foreign policies.

By the 1960s, Afrikaner writers and poets had gone from being widely revered to being regularly condemned by politicians and from the pulpits of Afrikaner Calvinist dominees. Afrikaner poets and writers who spoke out faced being disowned by friends and even by relatives, while also having their books and stage plays banned by National Party censors.

During the 1950s, '60s, and '70s, Uys Krige served as a mentor and father figure to Cape Town's racially mixed literary bohemia, which gathered in the beach-side suburb of Clifton. Due in large part to Krige's influence, membership in both literary bohemia and in the literary movement known as Die Sestigers ("The Writers of the Sixties") became synonymous with public opposition to both the National Party and Apartheid.

In her biography of Sestiger poet Ingrid Jonker, Louise Viljoen has described Die Sestigers as nothing less than "a cultural revolt in the heart of Afrikanerdom."

The Sestigers were also a literary movement that attempted to bring world literature to South Africa. Authors involved in the movement established a publishing house, Taurus, which printed writings that were controversial and that the government attempted to censor.

In 1970, at the height of John Vorster's leadership, a teenaged Antije Krog penned an anti-racist poem for her school magazine: Gee vir my 'n land waar swart en wit hand aan hand, vrede en liefde kan bring in my mooi land (Give me a land where black and white hand in hand, Can bring peace and love to my beautiful land) scandalising her rural, Afrikaans-speaking, and Pro-National Party community and bringing the national media to her parents' doorstep.

Described by her contemporary Joan Hambidge as "the Pablo Neruda of Afrikaans", Krog published her first book of verse, Dogter van Jefta (Daughter of Jephta) at the age of seventeen. Within the next two years, she published a second collection titled: Januarie-suite (January Suite). Since then she has published several further volumes, one in English. Much of her poetry deals with love, apartheid, the role of women, and the politics of gender. Her poetry has been translated into English, Dutch, and several other languages.

Writing in 1971, novelist André Brink alleged, "essentially more than ninety-percent of the Afrikaans writers are more or less pro-establishment, pro-system, pro-government", and called this, "a very simple, if disgusting fact." Brink elaborated, however, that to be a writer in Afrikaans was to be a cultural schizophrenic, "The average Afrikaans writer deems it sufficient to utter some neatly phrased remarks against censorship or the government. Nothing vital, nothing that can really upset anyone – but all very beautifully worded. We have the gift of the gab, praise the Lord."

Jack Cope, however, argued that the situation was more complex than Brink suggested. While a number of writers in Afrikaans were, "on the right wing", and were even thought to be members of the secret society known as the Broederbond, others were what was often termed, "cultural nationalists"; men and women who were firmly opposed to racial discrimination, but were terrified to, "cut the umbilical cord and face up to the loneliness of full creative independence." Cope also said that there were many Afrikaans, "writers of genuine insight who firmly believe themselves to be good patriots and conformers (Nationalists and Calvinists) but whose work turn on its head their own system of comfortable assumptions". Many other writers in Afrikaans were, according to Brink, "torn between attachment to their language, situation, and people on the one hand and their desire to bring about innovations, which are rejected or misunderstood. The writers find themselves too far ahead of their people and may become isolated, aliens in their own land - the fate of Eugène Marais."

Others, such as the Afrikaans poet Breyten Breytenbach, did speak out and, as a result, faced long prison terms under trumped up charges, as described in Breytenbach's ironically titled memoir True Confessions of an Albino Terrorist.

Breytenbach was incarcerated between 1975 and 1982 for high treason and for violating the Prohibition of Mixed Marriages Act and The Immorality Act by marrying a French woman of Vietnamese descent in Paris. According to André Brink, Breytenbach was retried in June 1977 on fanciful charges that among other things, he had planned a submarine attack by the Soviet Navy on the prison at Robben Island through the conspiratorial "Okhela Organisation." In the end, the judge found him guilty only of having smuggled letters and poems out of jail for which he was fined $50.

During his imprisonment, Breytenbach wrote the poem, Ballade van ontroue bemindes ("Ballade of Unfaithful Lovers"). Inspired by François Villon's Ballade des Dames du Temps Jadis, Breytenbach compared Afrikaner political dissident poets Peter Blum, Ingrid Jonker, and himself to unfaithful lovers, who had betrayed Afrikaans poetry by taking leave of it.

In a 1978 talk before the students at the University of Stellenbosch, novelist Jan Rabie said, "I cannot speak for the sum of thinking people, I only can say that I wonder if there remains a writer in the country who still has any respect for our government's apartheid policy." Rabie also spoke of a, "growing cleavage between the government and the intellectuals."

=== Post-apartheid ===
Ever since free elections toppled the National Party and ended Apartheid in 1994, the status of Afrikaans within South Africa has been much reduced. Afrikaans went from having equal status with English to being just one of 11 official languages, leading to a renewed dominance of English in the public sphere. Attempts to reverse the marginalisation of Afrikaans have been described as a third Afrikaans language movement.

At the same time, however, the Afrikaans language poets, writers, and intellectuals who were part of the opposition to National Party rule have gained worldwide attention and admiration. In particular, Afrikaans poet Ingrid Jonker was singled out for praise by Nelson Mandela, who recited an English translation of one of her poems aloud during his first address to the South African Parliament as president in 1994. Ingrid Jonker has since been portrayed on the big screen by Carice Van Houten in the 2011 biographical film Black Butterflies.

Furthermore, following both his release from imprisonment and the end of Apartheid, Breyten Breytenbach has become overwhelmingly seen as the Poet Laureate among speakers and readers of the Afrikaans language. As part of an effort to overcome the traditional hostility of Afrikaans speakers to the Catholic Church in South Africa, between 1981 and 2014, Franciscan Friar Bonaventure Hinwood published 8 collections of poetry in Afrikaans, as well as his translations of the Catechism of the Catholic Church, the Book of Psalms, and other religious texts, as his own contribution to Afrikaans literature.

== Notable authors ==
Notable authors writing or who wrote in Afrikaans include Jochem van Bruggen, André Brink, Breyten Breytenbach, Reza de Wet, Etienne Leroux, Jan Rabie, Ingrid Jonker, Adam Small, F. A. Venter, Bartho Smit, and Chris Barnard. E.K.M. Dido was the first black author to publish a novel in Afrikaans.

The Hertzog Prize is the highest award for South African literature generally, as well as for literature written in Afrikaans.

== See also ==
- Dutch-language literature
- Languages of South Africa
- Handwoordeboek van die Afrikaanse Taal
- South African literature
