= Murder of Deveney Nel =

South African murder case

- Location: 34.2257°S 19.4237°E; Hoërskool Overberg, Caledon, Wes-Kaap, Suid-Afrika
- Date: 7 August 2024 (2 years ago)
- Attack type: stone attack
- Weapon: sharp object
- Victim: Deveney Nel
- Motive: Unknown
- Charges: Murder; Rape; Perversion of justice
- Verdict: Guilty
- Convicted: 1

On 7 August 2024, the body of Deveney Nel, a 16-year-old student at Hoërskool Overberg in Caledon, South Africa, was found in a locked school storeroom. She had been fatally stabbed. It is believed that she was not murdered in the storeroom, but was dragged there from a toilet. A 17-year-old boy, who was a fellow student and friend of Nel, was arrested on 16 August in connection with her murder and charged. He was sentenced to 25 years in prison in October 2025 after confessing in a plea agreement to assaulting her, stabbing her to death, and hiding her body to cover up the murder.

== Background ==
Nel was a 16-year-old grade 10 student at Hoërskool Overberg in Caledon, South Africa. She lived in Grabouw. On the day of her murder, Nel was serving as a member of the first aid team at the school's sports meet.

== Incident ==
Nel was murdered in the vicinity of Hoërskool Overberg in Caledon on 7 August. Her body was found in a locked school storeroom. She was reported missing after missing her ride and failing to arrive at her home in Grabouw.

Nel was reportedly stabbed seven times in the back, torso and neck with a sharp object, which proved fatal. It is suspected that she was not murdered in the storeroom, but was dragged there after being stabbed, possibly from a toilet.

== Aftermath ==
A 17-year-old classmate, who was a friend of Nel, was arrested on the evening of 16 August and charged with her murder. Police were also awaiting the results of an autopsy and pathological tests to determine whether she had been raped. The murder was widely described as "senseless" and caused shock and outrage in the community.

Nel's memorial service was held on 16 August at the Caledon Mother Congregational Church.

=== Charges ===
The accused made his first appearance in the Caledon Magistrate's Court on 18 August 2024, where he was charged with murder. The case was postponed several times for further investigation, on 24 April 2025, the National Prosecuting Authority (NPA) declared that the case had been postponed for a forum decision. The case was transferred from the Magistrate's Court to the Western Cape High Court. The accused made his first appearance in the High Court on 12 September 2025.

The NPA confirmed that the accused would not be seeking bail at this time, and the NPA would oppose bail if he did apply.

Community members and protesters gathered outside the courthouse during court appearances, demanding justice for Nel.

=== Accused ===
The accused's identity is being withheld because he is a minor and cannot be named or photographed. The proceedings were held behind closed doors due to his minor status.

He was detained in a place of safety and underwent a 30-day psychiatric evaluation at Valkenburg Hospital. The assessment confirmed that he was fit to stand trial.

=== Previous rape case ===
The accused's history of sexual assault against an 11-year-old girl in 2020 played a major role in the public discourse surrounding the court proceedings and demands for justice. A Mossel Bay magistrate at the time struck out the 2020 rape case, despite warnings from a psychiatrist and clinical psychologist from Valkenberg Hospital that the accused was at "high risk of repeat offending [and] continued use of physical violence".

== Sentence ==
The accused was sentenced to 25 years in prison in October 2025 after he confessed in a plea agreement to assaulting Nel, stabbing her to death, and hiding her body to cover up the murder.
