= Quest for Love =

Quest for Love can mean:

- Quest for Love (1971 film), a 1971 British drama film directed by Ralph Thomas, based on the story Random Quest by John Wyndham
- Quest for Love (1988 film), a South African film, directed by Helena Nogueira: a lesbian love story set against political turmoil in Southern Africa
