= Uys Krige =

South African writer

- Born: Mattheus Uys Krige; 4 February 1910; Bontebokskloof, Cape Province, Union of South Africa
- Died: 10 August 1987 (aged 77); Hermanus, Cape Province, South Africa
- Occupations: author; poet
- Writing career
- Language: Afrikaans and English

Mattheus Uys Krige (4 February 1910 – 10 August 1987) was a South African writer of novels, short stories, poems and plays in Afrikaans and English. In Afrikaans literature, Krige is counted among the Dertigers ("Writers of the Thirties"). Uys Krige was, according to his friend Jack Cope, very much an exception among Afrikaner poets and writers of his generation due to his hostility to extreme Afrikaner nationalism, White Supremacism, and his literary translations of Latin American poetry by non-White authors into Afrikaans; which have had an enormous influence upon South African literature and culture. Later in his life, Krige served as a mentor and father figure to the Afrikaans literary movement known as die Sestigers; whom he convinced into speaking truth to power about the 1948–1994 rule of the National Party and its policies of both Apartheid and censorship in South Africa.

== Life ==
Uys Krige was born in Bontebokskloof (near Swellendam) in the Cape Province.

Even though the Krige family believed in Afrikaner nationalism, "the home atmosphere was broadminded and creative, his mother was a talented writer and his younger brother a leading painter."

Uys Krige was educated at the University of Stellenbosch. Like many other Afrikaner young men of his generation, Krige was invited to join the secret society known as the Broederbond, "But on discovering its rule of secrecy and the somewhat medieval rites, Krige beat a hasty retreat."

At the age of 21, Krige left for Europe, where he lived, "on a kind of cheerful vagabondage." Krige acquired fluency in French and Spanish. Whilst in France he played rugby for a team in Toulon, was a swimming coach on the Côte d'Azur, wrote poems and penned freelance articles for the Afrikaans press.

From 1931 to 1933, Krige lived at Martigues, in Provence as a tutor to the daughters of Anglo-African poet Roy Campbell and his English aristocrat-turned-bohemian wife, Mary Garman Campbell. The Campbells' oldest daughter, Anna Campbell, later recalled that Uys Krige replaced a French governess named Anne-Marie, who, "never taught us anything, but drove every night to the casino at Foss to dance". Anna later recalled, however, that she and her sister Tess, "enjoyed doing our lessons", with Uys Krige and that, thanks to him, "we made rapid progress. He stayed with us almost two years."

By the end of 1932, the Pound Sterling had devalued and it had become clear that Krige and the Campbells could no longer afford to live in France. During a discussion with Krige in the spring of 1933, Mary Campbell, "who had read the memoirs of Saint Theresa of Avila when she was six and had a preconceived idea of everything Spanish", recommended moving to Spain.

According to Anna Campbell Lyle, in 1933, the Barcelona pension where the Campbell family stayed was flooded with German Jews and other anti-Nazi political refugees, who held a traditional German Christmas celebration. At the same party, Uys Krige attended with a Catalan girlfriend and Anna Campbell Lyle danced a paso-doble on the table.

Krige returned to South Africa in 1935 and began a writing career as a reporter for the Rand Daily Mail.

The Campbells had converted to Roman Catholicism in Altea, Spain and, due to their new faith and to their first hand experiences of the Red Terror by forces loyal to the Second Spanish Republic in Toledo, the Campbells vocally supported the Nationalist faction during the ensuing Spanish Civil War. Meanwhile, Krige campaigned just as passionately for the Republican faction. Despite their views being at variance over the Spanish Civil War, Roy Campbell and Uys Krige remained friends and, in Campbell's 1952 memoir, Light on a Dark Horse, he explains Krige's Republican sympathies by the latter being, "an incurable Calvinist."

In 1937, Krige married the actor Lydia Lindeque, and they had their first child, Eulalia. During the same year, he wrote the Afrikaans poem, Lied van die fascistiese bomwerpers ("Hymn of the Fascist Bombers"). Krige later recalled, "I needed only a line or two, then the poem wrote itself. My hand could hardly keep pace. I did not have to correct anything. Well... that seldom happens to you." The poem condemned the bombing raids by pro-Nationalist German pilots of the Condor Legion. Inspired, according Jack Cope, by Krige's upbringing within Afrikaner Calvinism and its traditional hostility to an allegedly corrupt Pre-Reformation Church, Lied van die fascistiese bomwerpers also leveled savage attacks against Roman Catholicism.

According to Jack Cope, "The poem starts on a note of military pride – the eyes of the Fascist pilots fixed on themselves in their joyful and triumphant, their holy task. The tone of bitter irony rises as the pace becomes faster, climbing to height after height of savagery and contempt. The lines of the Latin liturgy become mixed with the brutal exultation of the mercenaries raining down death from their safe altitude. The Bible itself is rolled in the blood. The lovely place-names of Spain rise in gleams above the dust and smoke. In the end the hymn becomes an insane scream of violence and bloody destruction mocking even the Crucifixion."

As no Afrikaans journal dared to publish it, Uys Krige's Lied van die fascistiese bomwerpers appeared in the Forum, a Left-leaning literary journal published in English. Krige's poem elicited vehement condemnations from both extreme Afrikaner nationalists and from the Catholic Church in South Africa, which "protested vehemently" called Krige's poem sacrilegious. Krige responded by asking whether South African Catholics approved of the Nationalist's dismantling of what he considered the lawful Spanish Government or in the ongoing White Terror.

During World War II, Krige was a war correspondent with the South African Army during the Abyssinian Campaign and the North African Campaign. Captured at the Battle of Tobruk in 1941, he was sent to a POW camp in Fascist Italy from which he escaped after the overthrow of Benito Mussolini two years later. Krige was then smuggled back to Allied lines with the help of the Italian Resistance. Krige returned to South Africa able to speak fluent Italian. Krige subsequently wrote and published the English language war memoir, The Way Out, as well as war poetry and short stories.

After the National Party took power over South Africa in 1948, Krige actively campaigned as part of the Torch Commando alongside former RAF flying ace Sailor Malan and many other Afrikaner World War II veterans against the new Government's plans to disenfranchise Coloured voters.

In May 1952, Krige had lunch in London with fellow South African dissident writers Roy Campbell, Laurens van der Post, Enslin du Plessis, and Alan Paton. During the lunch, the five men composed and signed an open letter to the South African Government, in which they again denounced the ruling National Party's plans to disenfranchise Coloured voters. The letter was subsequently published by several South African newspapers.

In 1958, Krige, in spite of or because of his opposition to the National Party-dominated Government, was awarded an honorary doctorate by the University of Natal.

Beginning during the late 1950s and '60s, Krige served as a mentor to many fellow members of Cape Town's racially mixed literary bohemia, which gathered in the beach-side suburb of Clifton. Due in large part to Krige's influence, membership in both literary bohemia and in the literary movement known as Die Sestigers ("The Writers of the Sixties") became synonymous with public opposition to both the National Party and Apartheid.

The most famous of Krige's proteges was Ingrid Jonker and Krige played a major role in Jonker's transformation from the dutiful daughter of a National Party MP into a vocal critic of the National Party's policies of censorship and apartheid. When Jonker committed suicide by drowning in 1965, Krige spoke at her secular funeral.

Uys Krige also co-edited The Penguin Book of South African Verse (1968) with Jack Cope.

In an interview later in life, Krige told Jack Cope, "One of the biggest mistakes is to identify the Afrikaans language with the Nationalist Party."

Uys Krige died near Hermanus in the Cape Province in 1987, aged 77.

== Poetry ==
According to Uys Krige's friend Jack Cope, "He was essentially a lyric poet, his subjects personal, often romantic, sentimental; his technique despite a full acquaintance with Dada, Surrealism and other schools remained traditional, helped along with homely anecdotes and plentiful rhyme. He enjoyed the resonance and timbre of words and liked to exploit the nuances of his language as against the precision of French and Spanish with its darker more sensuous tones."

=== Literary translations ===
According to Jack Cope, Krige's linguistic and literary talent combined with his passion for French, Spanish, Italian and Portuguese literature made him the principal translator from Romance languages into Afrikaans during the 20th century.

Uys Krige translated many of the works of William Shakespeare from Elizabethan English into Afrikaans. He also translated works by Federico García Lorca, Pablo Neruda, Lope de Vega and Juan Ramón Jiménez from Spanish, works by Baudelaire, François Villon, Jacques Prévert, Arthur Rimbaud, and Paul Éluard from French, and "scores of poems" by anti-Mussolini Italian poets Salvatore Quasimodo and Giuseppe Ungaretti, with whom Krige struck up a friendship.

Krige's encounter with Latin American poetry while stationed in Cairo during World War II also led him to translate the poetry of Jacinto Fombona-Pachano, Jose Ramon Heredia, Vicente Huidobro, Jorge Carrera Andrade, Nicolas Guillen, Cesar Vallejo, Jorge de Lima and Manuel Bandeira into Afrikaans from both Spanish and Portuguese.

Jack Cope has written of Krige's translations of Latin American verse, "This important body of modern poetry, steeped in humanist tradition, non-racial to the extent that much of it was written by poets of Black, Indian, and mixed races, has had a considerable influence on South African writing, both in Afrikaans and English. English-language poets of the country such as Dan Jacobson and Charles Eglington have agreed that Krige's versions are in nearly every instance closer in spirit and tone to the originals than those yet achieved in English either in Britain or the United States. This says much for the translator/poet but also for the language he is using, which is able to capture more unaffectedly the warmth, softness, and resonance of Latin tongues."

== Legacy ==
In 1994, Uys Krige's granddaughter, Lida Orffer was murdered with her family at their home in Stellenbosch. The murderer was found to be a Black South African drifter whom the Orffer family had given his first real job. The murder of the Orffer family, which came within weeks of the free elections that toppled the ruling National Party and ended apartheid, horrified the town of Stellenbosch and made many local residents question whether Nelson Mandela's promise of a "rainbow nation" was truly possible.

In 2010, a collection of Uys Krige's letters from France and Spain was published by Hemel & See Boeke under the title Briewe van Uys Krige uit Frankryk en Spanje.

In celebration of the centenary of Krige's birth in 2010, South African composer Hendrik Hofmeyr was commissioned to compose a song cycle based on his poetry. The cycle Ek maak 'n hek oop in my hart was first performed in that year.

== In popular culture ==
- As of 2007, work was underway on an Ingrid Jonker biographical film under the title All that Breaks. Based on a screenplay by Helena Nogueira tested at Johannesburg's Market Theatre, the film was to focus on three years in Jonker's life and on her involvement with the literary bohemia which gathered around Uys Krige in the Cape Town suburb of Clifton. The film was to be produced by David Parfitt (Shakespeare in Love), Charles Moore, and Shan Moodley and to be directed by Nogueira.
- In the 2011 Ingrid Jonker biographical film Black Butterflies, Uys Krige is portrayed by actor Graham Clarke.

== Bibliography ==
All publications are in Afrikaans unless otherwise noted. The English translation is given in brackets.

- Collected poems:
  - Kentering (Change), 1935
  - Rooidag (Red day), 1940
  - Oorlogsgedigte (War poems), 1942
  - Hart sonder hawe (Heart without harbour), 1949
  - Ballade van die groot begeer (Ballad of the great desire), 1960
  - Vooraand (The evening before), 1964
- Novels:
  - Die palmboom (The palm tree), 1940
  - The dream and the desert (in English), 1953
- Travelogues and war correspondence:
  - The way out (in English), 1946
  - Sol y sombra, 1948 (Sun and Shade), with illustrations by his brother François
  - Ver in die wêreld (Far in the world), 1951
  - Sout van die aarde (Salt of the earth), 1961
- Plays:
  - Magdalena Retief, 1938
  - Die goue kring (The golden circle), 1956
- One-act plays:
  - Die wit muur (The white wall), 1940
  - Alle paaie gaan na Rome (All roads lead to Rome), 1949
  - Die sluipskutter, 1951 (translated by the author as "The sniper" in 1962)
