= Raapenberg Bird Sanctuary =

Protected area in Cape Town, on the Liesbeek river

- Location within Cape Town
- Location: Cape Town, South Africa
- Nearest city: Observatory
- Coordinates: 33°56′07″S 18°28′48″E
- Area: 10 ha (25 acres)
- Website: www.capetown.gov.za/en/EnvironmentalResourceManagement/publications/Documents/CCT_Nature_Reserves_book_2010-02.pdf

Raapenberg Bird Sanctuary is a 10-hectare (25-acre) protected area in Cape Town, located on the Liesbeek river near the suburb of Observatory.

The sanctuary consists of a section of the Liesbeek River, with parkland, trees, lawn and picnic sites. It is an important breeding site for a variety of water bird species, such as Sacred Ibis (Threskiornis aethiopicus), Egyptian Geese (Alopochen aegyptiacus) and many duck species. However, the sanctuary is badly overgrown with alien invasive plants which damage the river system and its biodiversity. The river itself is polluted, but is being rehabilitated for recreational activities.

The area is intended to form part of the Two Rivers Urban Park (TRUP), which will include many surrounding areas to form a large, integrated natural area in Cape Town. It will centre on the meeting point of the Liesbeek and Black River and will include several Provincial Heritage Sites, such as:

- the South African Astronomical Observatory (1827),
- Valkenberg Homestead (1830)
- Valkenberg Hospital (1899)
- The Nieuwe Molen Windmill
- The Oude Molen Farmhouse complex

== See also ==
- Biodiversity of Cape Town
- List of nature reserves in Cape Town
- Cape Lowland Freshwater Wetland
- City of Cape Town Nature Reserves. Free Booklet
