= Eugène Marais =

South African lawyer, naturalist, poet and writer

Eugène N. Marais
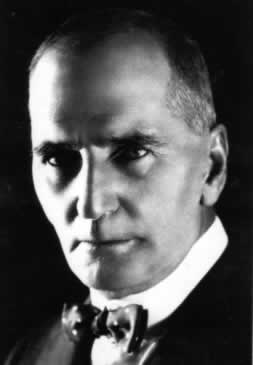
- Eugène N. Marais – writer, lawyer and naturalist
- Born: 9 January 1871; Pretoria, South African Republic
- Died: 29 March 1936 (aged 65); Farm near Pelindaba
- Resting place: Heroes' Acre, Pretoria, South Africa
- Occupations: Poet, naturalist, lawyer
- Spouse: Aletta Beyers (m. 1894–1895)
- Children: 1

Eugène Nielen Marais (/ˈjuːdʒiːn mɑːˈreɪ/; 9 January 1871 – 29 March 1936) was a South African lawyer, naturalist, writer and poète maudit in the Second Language Movement of Afrikaans literature. Since his death by his own hand, Marais has been widely hailed as a literary and scientific genius and a cultural hero of the Afrikaner people.

== His early years, before and during the Boer War ==
Marais was born in Pretoria, the thirteenth and last child of Jan Christiaan Nielen Marais and Catharina Helena Cornelia van Niekerk. He attended school in Pretoria, Boshof and Paarl, and much of his early education was in English, as were his earliest poems. He matriculated at the age of sixteen.

His family fluently spoke Afrikaans, Dutch, and English. In Marais's early teens, he started writing English poetry and greedily devoured the verse of William Shakespeare, John Milton, Robert Burns, the Lake poets, and the English Romantics.

After leaving school, he worked in Pretoria as a legal clerk and then as a journalist before becoming owner (1891, at the age of twenty) of a newspaper called Land en Volk (Country and (the Afrikaner) People). He involved himself deeply in local politics. In his role as a journalist and newspaper editor, Marais became a vocal critic of Paul Kruger, the widely revered President of the Republic of Transvaal, which made Marais a very unpopular figure.

He began taking opiates at an early age and graduated to morphine (then considered to be non-habit forming and safe) very soon thereafter. He became addicted, and his drug addiction ruled his affairs and actions to a greater or lesser extent throughout his life. When asked why he took drugs, he variously pleaded ill health, insomnia and, later, the death of his young wife as a result of the birth of his only child. Much later, he blamed accidental addiction while ill with malaria in Mozambique. Some claim his use of drugs was experimental and influenced by the philosophy of Thomas De Quincey.

Marais married Aletta "Lettie" Beyers (1871–1895), about whom he wrote in a letter to a friend: "She is just about the most perfect female in body and mind that God ever planted in South Africa." Shortly after the birth of a son, and eleven months into the marriage, she died from puerperal fever, purportedly caused by the inebriated doctor who attended the birth. The child, Eugène Charles Gerard Marais (1895–1977) was Marais's only child. The death devastated Marais and caused him to sink further into morphine addiction.

In 1897 – still in his mid-twenties – Marais went to London to read medicine. However, under pressure from his friends, he entered the Inner Temple to study law. He qualified as an advocate. When the Boer War broke out in 1899, he was put on parole as an enemy alien in London. During the latter part of the war he joined a German expedition that sought to ship ammunition and medicines to the Boer Commandos via Portuguese East Africa. However, he was struck down there by malaria and, before the supplies could be delivered to the Boers, the war ended in 1902.

== After the war ==
Marais switched from composing poetry in English to composing in Afrikaans during the despondent era that followed the British defeat and conquest of the two Boer Republics. As the leader of the Second Afrikaans Language Movement, Marais work was translated into various languages either late in his life or after his death.

From 1905 Marais studied nature in the Waterberg ('Water Mountain'), a wilderness area north of Pretoria, and wrote in his native Afrikaans about the animals he observed. His studies of termites led him to conclude that the colony ought to be considered as a single organism, a prescient insight that predated the elaboration of the idea by Richard Dawkins. In the Waterberg, Marais also studied the black mamba, spitting cobra and puff adder. Moreover, he observed a specific troop of baboons at length, and from these studies there sprang numerous magazine articles and the books My Friends the Baboons and The Soul of the Ape.

His book Die Siel van die Mier (The Soul of the Ant, but usually given in English as the Soul of the White Ant) was plagiarised by Nobel laureate Maurice Maeterlinck, who published La Vie des Termites (translated into English as The Life of Termites or The Life of White Ants), an entomological book, in what has been called "a classic example of academic plagiarism" by University of London's professor of biology, David Bignell.

Marais accused Maeterlinck of having used his concept of the "organic unity" of the termitary in his book. Marais had published his ideas on the termitary in the South African Afrikaans-language press, both in Die Burger in January 1923 and in Huisgenoot, which featured a series of articles on termites under the title "Die Siel van die Mier" (The Soul of the (White) Ant) from 1925 to 1926. Maeterlinck's book, with almost identical content, was published in 1926. It is alleged that Maeterlinck had come across Eugene Marais's series of articles, and that it would have been easy for Maeterlinck to translate from Afrikaans to French, since Maeterlinck knew Dutch and had already made several translations from Dutch into French before. It was common at the time for worthy articles published in Afrikaans to be reproduced in Flemish and Dutch magazines and journals.

Marais sent a letter to Dr. Winifred de Kock in London about Maeterlinck, in which he wrote that

The famous author had paid me the left-handed compliment of cribbing the most important part of my work... He clearly desired his readers to infer that he had arrived at certain of my theories (the result of ten years of hard labour in the veld) by his own unaided reason, although he admits that he never saw a termite in his life. You must understand that it was not merely plagiarism of the spirit of a thing, so to speak. He has copied page after page verbally.

Supported by a coterie of Afrikaner Nationalist friends, Marais sought justice through the South African press and attempted an international lawsuit. This was to prove financially impossible and the case was not pursued. However, Marais gained a measure of renown as the aggrieved party and as an Afrikaner researcher who had opened himself up to plagiarism because he published in Afrikaans out of nationalistic loyalty. Marais brooded at the time of the scandal: "I wonder whether Maeterlinck blushes when he reads such things [critical acclaim], and whether he gives a thought to the injustice he does to the unknown Boer worker?"

Maeterlinck's own words in The Life of Termites indicate that the possible discovery or accusation of plagiarism worried him:

It would have been easy, in regard to every statement, to allow the text to bristle with footnotes and references. In some chapters there is not a sentence but would have clamoured for these; and the letterpress would have been swallowed up by vast masses of comment, like one of those dreadful books we hated so much at school. There is a short bibliography at the end of the volume which will no doubt serve the same purpose.

Despite these misgivings, there is no reference to Eugène Marais in the bibliography. Maeterlinck's other works on entomology include The Life of the Ant (1930).

Professor VE d'Assonville wrote about Maeterlinck as "the Nobel Prize winner who had never seen a termite in his whole life and had never put a foot on the soil of Africa, least of all in the Waterberg.".

There is evidence that Marais's time and research in the Waterberg brought him great peace and joy and provided him with artistic inspiration. In the poem Waar Tebes in die stil woestyn, he writes (as translated into English by J. W. Marchant) 'There would I know peace once more, where Tebes in the quiet desert lifts it mighty rockwork on high ...'. (Tebus is one of the principal peaks of the area). That said, Marais was a long-term morphine addict and suffered from melancholy, insomnia, depression and feelings of isolation.

Also while living in the Waterberg District, Marais's literary output was heavily influenced by, "the pure poetry," he learned from local San people, Nama people, Khoi people, and from Herero refugees from German Southwest Africa. Marais also collected a very large store of African folklore in the Waterberg District from an elderly San storyteller locally nicknamed Ou Hendrick. Marais published his stories in Afrikaans under the title Dwaalstories ("Wandering Stories").

Several years before his death, the Rev. A. J. Louw, an Afrikaner Calvinist dominee known as "The Pope of the Highveld", confronted Marais during a haus bezoek, or ministerial visitation, for believing in Darwinian evolution. Marais replied, "Don't pick on me, Dominee. It's a matter between you and the Almighty. I really had nothing to do with the creation of the Universe."

One of Marais's last poems, Diep Rivier ("Deep River"), is an ode to the drug morphine and was written ten years before its author's death by his own hand.

== Death ==
On 29 March 1936, having been forsaken by his friends and family and deprived of morphine for several days, Marais borrowed a shotgun on the pretext of killing a snake and shot himself in the chest. The wound was not fatal, and Marais therefore put the gun barrel in his mouth and pulled the trigger.

Marais took his own life on the farm Pelindaba, which belonged to his friend Gustav Preller. For those who are familiar with the dark moods of certain of Marais's poems, there is a black irony there; in Zulu language, phelile indaba means "end of discussion" or "we will not talk about this anymore".

Robert Ardrey, an admirer of Eugène Marais's, attributed Marais's suicide to the theft of his intellectual property by Maeterlinck. Ardrey said in his introduction to The Soul of the Ape, published in 1969, that "[A]s a scientist he was unique, supreme in his time, yet a worker in a science unborn." He also refers to Marais's work at length in his book African Genesis.

Eugéne Marais and his wife Aletta lie buried in the Heroes' Acre, Pretoria.

== Legacy ==
Marais's work as a naturalist, although by no means trivial (he was one of the first scientists to practise ethology and was repeatedly acknowledged as such by Robert Ardrey and others), gained less public attention and appreciation than his literary work. He discovered the Waterberg Cycad, which was named after him (Encephalartos eugene-maraisii). He was the first person to study the behaviour of wild primates, and his observations continue to be cited in contemporary evolutionary biology. He is among the greatest of the Afrikaner poets and remains one of the most popular, although his output was not large. Opperman described him as the first professional poet in Afrikaans; Marais believed that craft was as important as inspiration for poetry. Along with J. H. H. de Waal and G. S. Preller, he was a leading light in the Second Afrikaans Language Movement in the period immediately after the Second Boer War, which ended in 1902. Some of his finest poems deal with the wonders of life and nature, but he also wrote about his own inexorable death. Marais was isolated due to some of his beliefs. He was a self-confessed pantheist and claimed that the only time he entered a church was for weddings. An assessment of Marais's status as an Afrikaner hero was published by historian Sandra Swart.

Marais was also fascinated by the folklore, cultures, and traditions of the Bantu peoples of the rural Transvaal; this is often seen in poems such as "Die Dans van die Reën" (The Dance of the Rain).

Since his death, Eugène Marais has been cited as the prototype of the many dissident Afrikaans-speaking poets, writers, and intellectuals in South Africa under apartheid (1948–1994). At the beginning of his 1982 book, The Adversary Within: Dissident Writers in Afrikaans, Jack Cope explained that the famous confrontation between Eugène Marais and Rev. A. J. Louw is symptomatic of a much wider dispute in Afrikaner culture.

Many highly important figures in Afrikaans literature during the Apartheid felt similarly, according to André Brink, "torn between attachment to their language, situation, and people on the one hand and their desire to bring about innovations, which are rejected or misunderstood. The writers find themselves too far ahead of their people and may become isolated, aliens in their own land – the fate of Eugène Marais."

== Poetry translations ==
=== Winternag ===
The following translation of Marais's "Winternag" is by J. W. Marchant:

"Winter's Night"

O the small wind is frigid and spare
and bright in the dim light and bare
as wide as God's merciful boon
the veld lies in starlight and gloom
and on the high lands
spread through burnt bands
the grass-seed, astir, is like beckoning hands.

O East-wind gives mournful measure to song
Like the lilt of a lovelorn lass who's been wronged
In every grass fold
bright dewdrop takes hold
and promptly pales to frost in the cold!

While the above translation is generally faithful, and is a fine poem in English, it does not quite capture the terse directness of the Afrikaans language, which makes Afrikaans poetry so bittersweet and evocative, striking straight to the heart and soul. Below follows a translation by Farrell Hope, which may closer reflect the original Afrikaans idiom. Note the above version by J. W. Marchant, as well as the third version below by At de Lange, both translate the Afrikaans word in the poem skade (damage) as if it was skadu (shade). This is a common error in translating the poem and misses the point Marais was making: that the British forces had destroyed the Boer farms.

"Winternight"

O the small wind is frigid and spare
and bright in the dim light and bare
as wide as God's merciful boon
the veld lies in starlight and gloom
and on the high lands
spread through burnt bands
the grass-seed, astir, is like beckoning hands.

O East-wind gives mournful measure to song
Like the lilt of a lovelorn lass who's been wronged
In every grass fold
bright dewdrop takes hold
and promptly pales to frost in the cold!

An English translation by At de Lange preserves the musicality of the poem quite well:

"Winter's Night"

O cold is the slight wind,
and keen.
Bare and bright in dim light
is seen,
as vast as the graces of God,
the veld's starlit and fire-scarred sod.
To the high edge of the lands,
spread through the scorched sands,
new seed-grass is stirring
like beckoning hands.

O mournful the tune
of the East-wind refrain,
like the song of a girl
who loved but in vain.
One drop of dew glistens
on each grass-blade's fold
and fast does it pale
to frost in the cold!

=== Die dans van die reën ===
The dance of the rain

O the dance of our Sister!
First over the mountaintop she sneaks,

and her eyes are ashamed;
and she laughs softly.

And from afar she calls with one hand;
her bracelets shine and her beads sparkle; (Note: In the original language, Afrikaans, the word used for sparkle is skitter, which adds to the onomatopoeia of a high pitch rumbling sound)

softly, she calls.

She speaks to the winds of the dance
and she invites them out, because the wharf is wide and the wedding great.

The big game (Note: Referring to game animals) hurry out the plains,

their dam (Note: A collection point by which the animals gather) on the hilltop,

open wide their nostrils

and swallow (Note: In the original language, the word used implies a desperate nature to the swallowing) the wind;

and they bend down, to see her delicate footprints in the sand.
The little people deep under the ground (Note: The small underground animals of the desert) hear the dragging of her feet,

and they crawl closer and sing softly:

"Our Sister! Our Sister! You have come! You have come!"

And her beads shake,
and her copper rings shine (Note: Intended to convey lightning) in the setting of the sun.

On her forehead is the fire plume of the mountain vulture;

her stomp from the heights;

she spreads her drab Kaross with both arms out;

The breath of the wind taken away.
O, the dance of our Sister

The poem is intended to convey a sense of great happiness felt by all inhabitants of the desert, animal and man, when the rain arrives. It follows the idea of the sister (rain/rainy weather) dancing across the desert plains and the effects across the land.

== Die Wonderwerker ==
This 2012 movie directed by Katinka Heyns explores Marais's convalescence from malaria on a farm in the Waterberg.

== Cultural references ==
- Eugene Marais is fictionalised in Brian Catling's Vorrh trilogy in the last of the series, The Cloven.
- The Soul of the Ape is visible on the floor of the hotel room of the protagonist in the 1975 film The Passenger by Michelangelo Antonioni.
- The Soul of the Ape and The Soul of the Ant are both referenced in the book The Soul of Viktor Tronko by David Quammen, published 1987

== The Marais name ==
The progenitors of the Marais name in the region were Charles and Claude Marais, from the Paris region of France. The Marais name has retained its original French spelling and pronunciation in South Africa.

== See also ==
- Afrikaans folklore
- Eugène Marais Prize

== Bibliography ==
- The Soul of the White Ant, 1937, first published as Die Siel van die Mier in 1925, in Afrikaans
- The Soul of the Ape, 1919, published posthumously in 1969 .

== Notes ==
1. Ces Francais Qui Ont Fait L'Afrique Du Sud. Translation: The French People Who Made South Africa. Bernard Lugan. January 1996. ISBN 2841000869'
2. Opperman, D.J. Undated but probably 1962. Senior verseboek. Nasionale Boekhandel Bpk, Kaapstad. Negende druk, 185pp
3. Schirmer, P. 1980. The concise illustrated South African encyclopaedia. Central News Agency, Johannesburg. First edition, about 212pp.
4. Rousseau, Leon 1982, The Dark Stream: The Story of Eugène N. Marais. Jonathan Ball Publishers, JeppesTown.
5. Hogan, C.Michael, Mark L. Cooke and Helen Murray, The Waterberg Biosphere, Lumina Technologies Inc, 22 May 2006.
6. Marais, Eugène, Soul of the Ape, Human and Rousseau (1937)
7. Ardrey, Robert The Territorial Imperative: A Personal Inquiry into the Animal Origins of Property and Nations, 1966
8. Van Niekerk, H. L. Eugène Marais: Nuwe Feite en Nuwe Inligting 2010 (Eugène Marais: New Facts and New Insights)
