= Black Butterflies =

- Theatrical release poster
- Directed by: Paula van der Oest
- Written by: Greg Latter (script)
- Produced by: Frans van Gestel; Richard Claus; Arry Voorsmit; Michael Auret
- Starring: Carice van Houten; Liam Cunningham; Graham Clark; Nicholas Pauling; Candice D'Arcy; Rutger Hauer
- Cinematography: Giulio Biccari
- Edited by: Sander Vos
- Music by: Philip Miller
- Production companies: IDTV Film; Cool Beans
- Distributed by: A-Film Distribution
- Release date: 31 March 2011
- Running time: 110 minutes
- Country: Netherlands
- Language: English

Black Butterflies is an English-language Dutch drama film about the life of South-African Afrikaans poet and anti-apartheid political dissident Ingrid Jonker. The film was directed by Paula van der Oest and premiered in the Netherlands on February 6 before being released on 31 March 2011.

== Plot ==
Ingrid and Anna Jonker live in a seaside shack with their elderly grandmother. One night, Anna rushes into the bedroom and tells Ingrid that their grandmother is not breathing. As her body is carried away in a hearse, the politician Abraham Jonker (Rutger Hauer) arrives and expresses shock that the girls have no shoes. When Anna asks what they are to call him, Abraham replies, "Call me 'Pa.'"

Decades later, in 1960, an adult Ingrid (Carice van Houten) is swimming against the current near the Cape Town suburb of Clifton when she starts to go under. Hearing her cries, a man on shore (Liam Cunningham) dives into the water to save her. They reach the shore, and he introduces himself as novelist Jack Cope. Overjoyed, Ingrid says she has read his novel. Jack asks how she likes it. She replies that his novel saved her life. Jack is stunned to hear she is "the poet Ingrid Jonker."

Her sister Anna interrupts to say their father is waiting for her. Abraham tells Ingrid that her estranged husband, Pieter Venter, asked for a ride to her house. Ingrid says that she and Pieter have nothing in common. In the flat Ingrid and her infant daughter share with Anna, Pieter pleads for another chance. Jack calls to invite Ingrid to a party with his literary bohemian friends. Ingrid refuses Pieter and goes to the party. There, a black writer says that the Censorship Board has banned his unpublished novel and the police have confiscated the manuscript. He laments four years of his life gone to waste.

Jack and Ingrid drive the writer to the black township of Nyanga. On the way, they are stopped by a white cop, who tries to give the writer trouble. The writer tells Jack that Ingrid's father, Abraham Jonker, represents the white supremacist National Party in Parliament and is the Chair of the Censorship Board which banned his novel. Jack says Ingrid isn't like her father. Jack and Ingrid go to his flat, where he tells her he has two children and is going through an ugly divorce. Ingrid shows him a poem she wrote in his honor, and Jack is moved. He asks why she wrote it, and she says his novel saved her life. They become lovers.

Later, Jack tells her he is madly in love with her and asks her and her daughter to move in with him. She accepts. However, Jack refuses to marry her. Although Ingrid continues to write, Jack eventually says he is unable to write and says that constantly emotionally supporting Ingrid "drains" him. He decides to visit his sons and their mother for two or three months in order to finish his novel. Although Jack promises to return, Ingrid is distraught at the idea of being apart for so long and begs him not to go. She quits her job to see him off at the train station, where she asks him to stay or take her with him. Jack leaves. Ingrid is shown having a secret abortion.

Jack calls to tell Ingrid that he will be away for another month. Soon after, she meets novelist Eugene Maritz (based on André Brink). Eugene is a fan of Ingrid's poetry, and poet and playwright Uys Krige lauds Maritz as the great hope of Afrikaans literature. Out of both anger and desperate loneliness over Jack's absence, Ingrid seduces Maritz. Jack returns to find Maritz's shoes in his closet and kicks Ingrid out.

Ingrid and Jack witness the police shoot at a car, killing a black child. The horror of this motivates Ingrid to write her most famous poem, Die Kind, which calls the child a martyr and subtly prophesies that one day Apartheid will end.

Meanwhile, Abraham Jonker is depicted as a tyrannical man who withholds validation and affection from his daughter and who is enraged by her political dissent against apartheid, her friendships with dissident writers whose work he bans, and her own poetry. When Ingrid asks Abraham to read her Anti-Apartheid poem Die Kind, Abraham reads only part of it and rips it up.

Ingrid's interpersonal issues with her father and the love triangle with Jack and Eugene lead her into major depression and psychosis. She is committed to Valkenberg Hospital, where Jack visits her and learns about Ingrid's secret termination of their unborn child. He asks why she did not tell him. She says he would have married her only for that reason. Ingrid tells him the hospital took all her poems, but she still has them in her head. Jack finds a pocketbook full of poems in the box of her belongings and is deeply impressed. Taking the poems with him, Jack and Uys Krige feverishly work to compile them into the poetry book Rook en Oker ("Smoke and Ochre"). After Ingrid is released, the book is accepted by a publisher. She dedicates the book to Jack and Uys.

The book is well-reviewed and nominated for the prestigious APB Award. Ingrid is able to go to Europe for the first time. Before leaving, she visits her father at work to give him the news and asks him to accompany her. Her father tells her he wanted to ban her book and only did not do so because his subordinates told him it would cause a scandal. Seething with hatred, Abraham brings up Ingrid's promiscuity and denounces his daughter as a "slut". Abraham says he never wants to see Ingrid again.

Ingrid asks Jack to accompany her to Europe, but he says the government would not issue him a passport because of his political views. She invites Eugene, and he accepts. During the trip, he finds her writing a poem about her love for Jack and is furious. He tells her he is returning to South Africa early. Ingrid performs another abortion on herself and is hospitalized in Paris. The hospital calls her father to ask for permission to conduct electroconvulsive shock therapy. He gives his permission.

After returning to Cape Town, Ingrid is no longer able to write and no longer smiles. She goes to Jack's home one night and gives him her AFB medal along with a Walt Whitman poem as a statement of her love for him. Even though Jack asks her to move back in with him, Ingrid leaves and takes her life by walking into the ocean. Later, a devastated Jack is shown watching from a distance as her body is being recovered.

The film ends as the camera pans over the sea as a recording of Jack Cope and Uys Krige's English translation of Ingrid Jonker's poem Die Kind is read aloud by Nelson Mandela. The text reveals that Mandela read the poem during his first address as President to the South African Parliament after the end of Apartheid.

== Cast ==
- Carice van Houten as Ingrid Jonker
- Rutger Hauer as Abraham Jonker
- Liam Cunningham as Jack Cope
- Graham Clarke as Uys Krige

== Release ==
The film was released on Blu-ray and DVD on 1 September 2011.

== Reception ==
On the review aggregator website Rotten Tomatoes, 69% of 13 critics' reviews are positive, with an average rating of 5.6/10. Metacritic, which uses a weighted average, assigned the film a score of 66 out of 100, based on nine critics, indicating "generally favorable" reviews.
