= Observatory, Cape Town =

Observatory
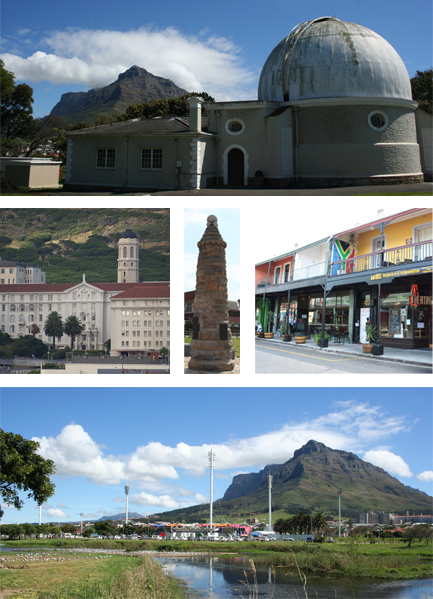
- Top: One of the historic buildings at the former Royal Observatory, Cape of Good Hope. Middle left: Groote Schuur Hospital. Centre Middle: A World War I monument. Middle right: Cafes on lower main road in Observatory. Bottom: Observatory's soccer and Hartleyvale Stadium looking towards Devil's Peak.
- Interactive map of Observatory
- Coordinates: 33°56′16″S 18°28′15″E
- Country: South Africa
- Province: Western Cape
- Municipality: City of Cape Town

Government
  - Councillor: Yusuf Mohamed (DA)

Area
  - Total: 3.10 km^{2} (1.20 sq mi)
- Elevation: 21 m (69 ft)

Population (2011)
  - Total: 9,207
  - Density: 2,970/km^{2} (7,690/sq mi)

Racial makeup (2011)
  - Black African: 39.7%
  - Coloured: 18.5%
  - Indian/Asian: 3.6%
  - White: 34.4%
  - Other: 3.9%

First languages (2011)
  - English: 66.2%
  - Afrikaans: 11.2%
  - Xhosa: 5.9%
  - Zulu: 1.4%
  - Other: 15.4%
- Time zone: UTC+2 (SAST)
- Postal code (street): 7925
- PO box: 7935

Observatory is a suburb in Cape Town, South Africa, colloquially known as Obs. Bordered by Mowbray to the south and Salt River to the northwest, the area is best known as a student neighbourhood associated with the nearby University of Cape Town and Groote Schuur Hospital. It takes its name from the South African Astronomical Observatory headquarters, built in 1829 by the Royal Observatory.

== Geography ==
Observatory is situated on the north-facing lower slopes of Devil's Peak. The slope runs into the Liesbeeck River and, as such, much of present-day lower Observatory was a marshy estuary formed by the rivers, where buffalo, hippo, elephant, zebra, jackals, antelope, lions and leopards were once prevalent.

The Raapenberg Bird Sanctuary protects 10 hectares (25 acres) of land along the Liesbeek River.

== History ==
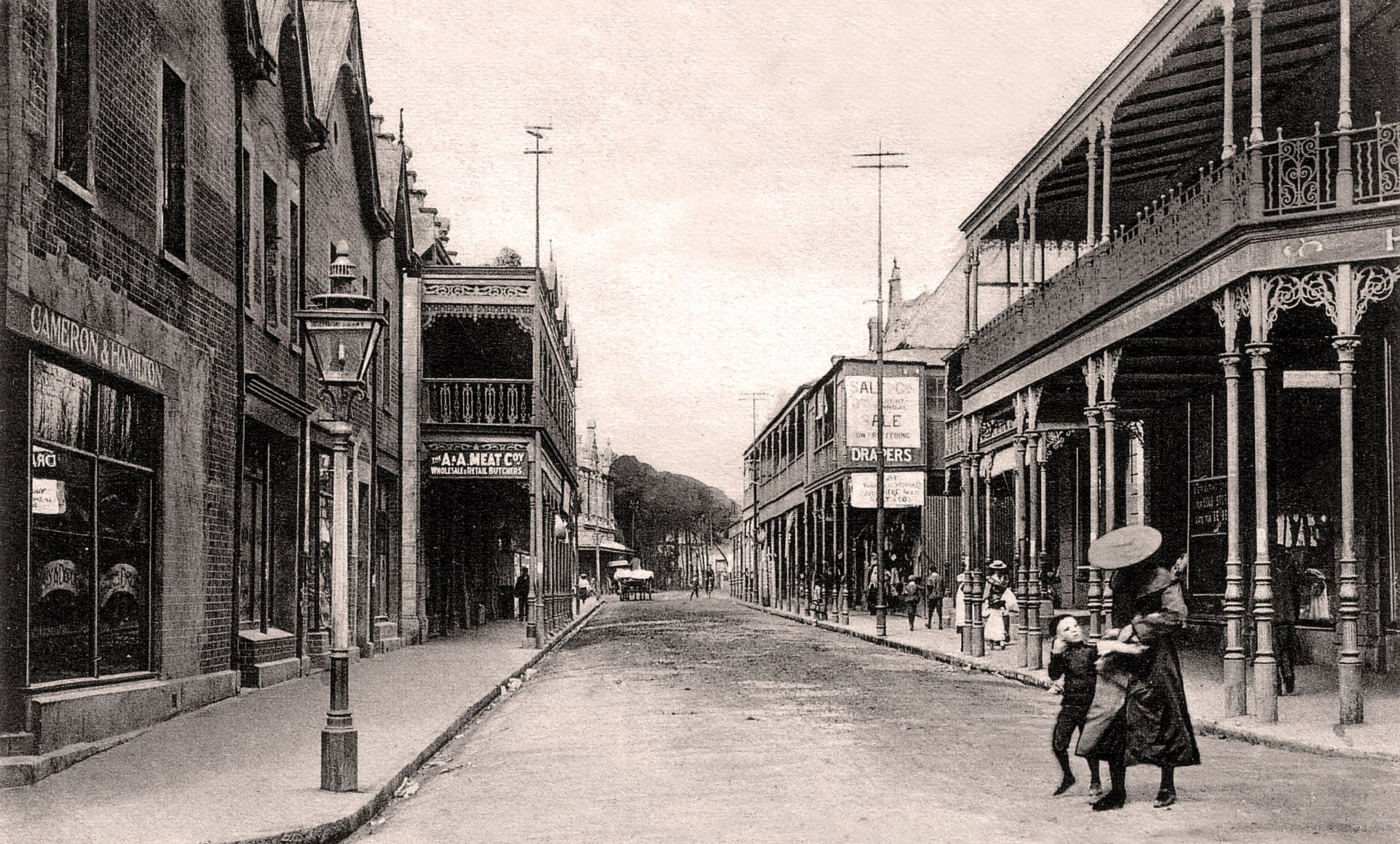
Lower Main Road, Observatory around the year 1900.

In 1510, the area was the scene of a raid by the Portuguese, led by Francisco de Almeida, on a Goringhaiqua Khoikhoi village, which ultimately led to the death of de Almeida and approximately sixty of his compatriots during the Battle of Salt River.

Modern-day Observatory traces its origins to the Koornhoop Colony land grant issued in 1657. Between February 1657 and February 1658, fourteen free burghers were granted land by the Dutch East India Company along the Liesbeeck River valley. The then governor of the Cape, Jan van Riebeek, decreed that a fortified building called "Fort Coornhoop" be built as one of several small forts to protect against the Khoikhoi. Part of what was developed as Koornhoop became Uitwyk, which is now known as Malta Farm.

The name is derived from the location and construction of the Royal Observatory, Cape of Good Hope in the area at 33°56′7.13″S 18°28′38.47″E in 1820. The Royal Observatory in Observatory, Cape Town, houses the McClean Telescope. The building was designed by Sir Herbert Baker and was completed in 1897. The original buildings now serve as the headquarters of the South African Astronomical Observatory, with an on-site museum exhibiting various historic instruments and telescopes.

=== Heidelberg Tavern massacre ===
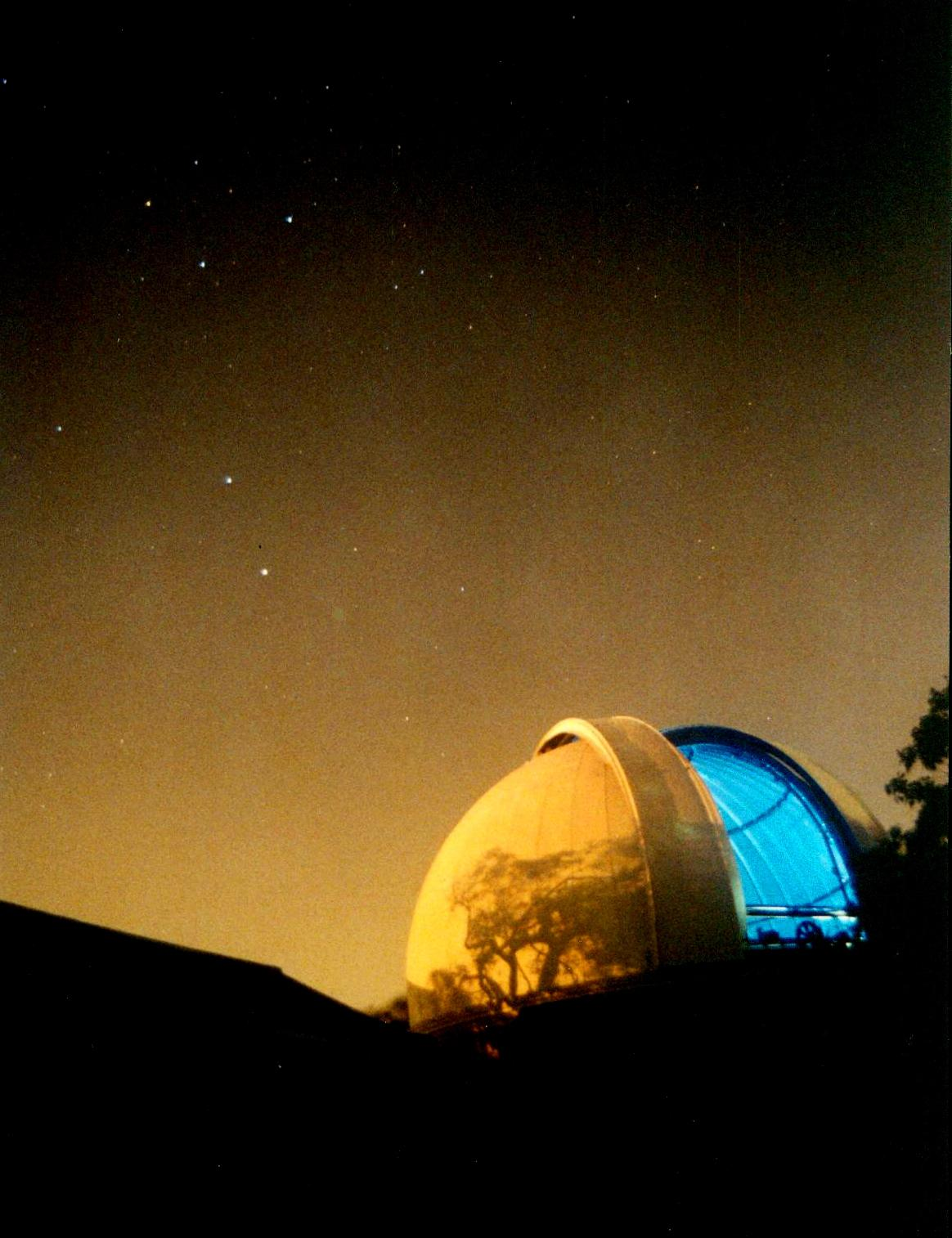
McClean Observatory Cape Town

During the years of apartheid, Observatory was one of the few de facto 'grey' suburbs where all races lived together. On the evening of 30 December 1993, three men entered a popular student venue on Station Road, called the Heidelberg Tavern and opened fire, killing four people and injuring five. The three APLA operatives – Humphrey Luyanda Gqomfa, Vuyisile Brian Madasi and Zola Prince Mabala – were convicted in November 1994 for what became known as the Heidelberg Massacre. On 16 July 1998, the Truth and Reconciliation Commission granted the three amnesty.

== Modern Observatory ==
It continues to be a somewhat alternative part of town, with 'New Age' stores including an anarchist store, and several programmes at the Observatory Community Centre. It is served by Observatory railway station on the Southern Line, with regular trains every 40 minutes or so, and every hour on Sunday.

Observatory is the location for much of the short-term accommodation used by increasing numbers of international students attending UCT.

=== Amenities ===
The suburb's proximity to the University of Cape Town (UCT) and its medical school in particular, has always made it popular with both students and faculty. Observatory has long been a vibrant area, as a result of its high proportion of students. There are numerous restaurants and bars, and many neighbourhood staples. Most restaurants and retail shops are located along Lower Main road with a 95-year-old bottle store, Observatory Liquors, situated in the middle. There is also a shopping complex in St. Peter's square, which is located opposite Groote Schuur graveyard.

Observatory is home to many churches. The Anglican parish church of St Michael and All Angels, designed by Sir Herbert Baker and the only one of his churches completed to his design, is a bastion of Anglo-Catholicism within the Anglican community of South Africa and has a strong choral tradition.

Observatory has a soccer and hockey stadium below the station, Hartleyvale Stadium which is flanked on one side by Liesbeeck Parkway and on the other by Willow Road. In this section of land, there is also an outdoor swimming pool that is popular on summer afternoons – between the two there's a circus school.

=== Civic involvement ===
There are several civic organisations in the suburb. The longest serving is the Observatory Civics Association (OCA) that liaises between the local residents, NGOs, businesses and the City of Cape Town. The Observatory Civics Association is a member of the Greater Cape Town Civic Alliance. The OCA worked with the City of Cape Town to upgrade the Village Green and relocate the World War II memorial from the N2.

In November 2009, the Observatory Improvement District was launched to enhance the suburb with better security and maintenance. The Observatory Improvement District covers almost all of Observatory below Main Road. In 2010, walking and cycle paths were established on the western side of the Liesbeek River.

There are two birdwatching hides on the river, one in the grounds of the South African Observatory, and one in the grounds of the River Club.

== Hospitals ==
Beyond the astronomical observatory is Valkenberg psychiatric hospital, a Victorian heritage building that has recently undergone extensive renovations. Valkenberg houses the mentally ill in secure accommodation, as well as providing out patient care. Beyond Valkenberg is a small hotel, and the Wild Fig restaurant.

The Groote Schuur Hospital looms over the suburb, and is the hospital where Professor Chris Barnard performed the world's first heart transplant, on 3 December 1967. This event is the theme of the Heart of Cape Town Museum, located at the hospital.

== Crime and security ==
As with most of South African urban spaces, crime is a problem, with burglary and muggings. In the past decade there were several murders, however security has now improved with active local civic participation. A pioneering community security organisation, Obs Watch, ran bicycle patrols for years, but became defunct. In 2006 this was formally replaced by the Observatory Neighbourhood Watch, and this intervention has made a significant impact on cleansing and safety in the suburb. Large CCTV cameras have been erected at most of the exits and entrances to Obs.

== Controversy ==
In 2021, Amazon announced that it would be the main tenant and investor in a 15 hectares (37 acres) site in Cape Town along the Salt, Black and Liesbeek Rivers that is being turned into an expansive complex with residences, shops, a hotel, conference centre and a business park. It is expected to become the African headquarters for Amazon, which hopes to base its expanding operations in Africa. However, in May 2022, a court in Cape Town upheld a judgment in March which stopped work on the sprawling complex until further consultations had taken place with groups representing Indigenous Khoisan communities, who object to building on a site they consider sacred. Construction is currently halted due to fears of displacement, as well as concerns over Amazon's business practices.
