= E.K.M. Dido =

South African writer (born 1951)

E.K.M. Dido (born 1951), often simply known as Dido, is a South African writer. With her first book Die storie van Monica Peters (1996), she became the first black woman to publish an Afrikaans-language novel.

== Early life and education ==
E.K.M. Dido was born in 1951 in Tsomo, South Africa. She was the oldest daughter in a family of 12 children. Dido describes her parents as coloured, and she grew up speaking Afrikaans interchangeably with Xhosa. She is also fluent in English.

Dido went to a Catholic boarding school in Cradock. She then trained as a nurse, eventually gaining a bachelor's in nursing administration, community nursing, and nursing education from the University of South Africa. She settled in Cape Town in 1972.

== Literary career ==
The author publishes under the name E.K.M. Dido. She keeps private what E.K.M. stands for, only saying that it is a combination of her mother's, grandmother's, and great-grandmother's names.

Dido's writing focuses on South African women dealing with societal and personal issues in a country caught between modernity and tradition, and amid a swirl of cultural identities. She is considered a pioneer of Afrikaans literature.

In 1996, she published Die storie van Monica Peters ("The Story of Monica Peters"). With this, she became the first black woman to publish an Afrikaans-language novel. She had originally written the story in English before deciding to publish it in Afrikaans instead. She rejects "the bad idea that Afrikaans belongs to white people."

Her 2000 novel ’n Stringetjie blou krale ("A String of Blue Beads") was considered her real breakthrough, dealing with issues of racial identity and "coloured" ancestry in South Africa. It was followed by the novels Die onsigbares (2003) and ’n Ander ek i (2007).

Her short stories have been included in Afrikaans anthologies and in the English-language collection In the Rapids: New South African Stories (2001).

She has been involved with the Klein Karoo Nasionale Kunstefees and served as director of Suidoosterfees, a cultural festival in Cape Town. In 2012, as part of Suidoosterfees, she adapted her short story "Baby" for the stage.

In 2005, Dido was granted an honorary doctorate in literature from the University of the Western Cape. Alongside her literary efforts, she continued to teach nursing in the suburbs of Cape Town.

== Selected works ==
- Die storie van Monica Peters (1996)
- Rugdraai en stilbly (1997)
- ’n Stringetjie blou krale (2000)
- Die onsigbares (2003)
- ’n Ander ek i (2007)
- Emma en Nella (2010)
