= South African folklore =

South African Folklore originates from an oral, historical tradition. It is rooted in the region's landscape with animals – and the animal kingdom – playing a dominant role. Some of the subjects covered include: plant life taking on a human form, women being married to gods, messages being delivered by thunder. Music and song is often used to tell the story and the tales values are usually African, with community and sharing being key. Some 19th century folklore tales from this genre include: "Crocodiles Treason", "Lion’s Share", The World's Reward, "The Dance for Water or Rabbit’s Triumph", "The Hunt of Lion and Jackal", The Zebra Stallion, "Lion Who Taught Himself Wiser Than His Mother" and "the Origin of Death".

== See also ==
- Afrikaans folklore
