= Joan Hambidge =

Afrikaans poet, literary theorist and academic

- Born: 11 September 1956 (age 70); Aliwal North, South Africa
- Occupations: Academic, poet, writer, critic

Joan Helene Hambidge (born 11 September 1956) is South African poet, literary theorist and academic. She is a prolific poet in the Afrikaans language. Her theoretic contributions deal mainly with Roland Barthes, deconstruction, postmodernism, psychoanalysis and metaphysics.

== Biography ==
Hambridge was born in Aliwal North. Hambidge studied at the University of Stellenbosch and the University of Pretoria. She was admitted to a doctorate under André P. Brink at Rhodes University in 1985. A second doctorate followed (University of Cape Town, 2001).

Although Hambidge says she discovered her muse when she was young, it was while she was a lecturer at the University of the North, Limpopo Province, South Africa, that she started to blossom as a writer.

She was awarded the Eugène Marais Prize for literature for her second volume of poetry, Bitterlemoene ("Bitter Oranges"), in 1986. This prize is one of the most coveted literary prizes in South Africa. She also won the Litera Prize as well as the Poetry Institute of Africa Prize for her poetry. She was shortlisted for the prestigious 2026 Hertzog Prize for Poetry for her collection Asindeton.

She lectured at UCT from 1992 until her retirement in 2021. She began as a senior lecturer and was later a Professor at the School of Languages and Literatures at the University of Cape Town. In 2021, she was appointed as a Fellow of the University of Cape Town.

=== Major creative works ===
Although she writes in Afrikaans, Hambidge has translated some of her poetry into English. Other translations have been done by Jo Nel, fellow poet and close friend Johann de Lange, and Charl JF Cilliers. Her work has been published in the Netherlands and the UK as well as in the US. Having published 26 volumes of poetry up to 2016, she is the most prolific poet in Afrikaans.

Hambidge's interest in literary theory (especially psychoanalysis and metafiction) is reflected in her writing, especially in her fiction. She works with the difference between theory and practice in her novels, Judaskus ("Judas kiss", 1998) and "Kladboek" (2008). She has also published two theoretical works: Postmodernisme (1995), about Roland Barthes, deconstruction and post-modernism, and Psigoanalise en lees ("Psychoanalysis and reading", 1991), on Jacques Lacan and reading.

=== Other contributions ===
Hambidge is a prolific traveller and writes a weekly column for a Cape Town daily, Die Burger. She is a critic and columnist for the Afrikaans literary e-zine Litnet.

== Literary style ==
Hambidge is famous for her iconoclastic and irreverent approach to literary traditions in Afrikaans and cultural idols and for her re-examination of previously taboo subjects. She is also the first Afrikaans author to have dealt with lesbianism from an insider's point of view. She imposes a humorous and satirical twist on most of the subjects she tackles.

== Volumes of poetry ==
- Hartskrif (1985) ("Heart Script")
- Bitterlemoene (1986) ("Bitter oranges")
- Die anatomie van melancholie (1987) ("The anatomy of melancholy")
- Palinodes (1987)
- Geslote baan (1988) ("Closed circuit")
- Donker labirint (1989) ("Dark labyrinth")
- Gesteelde appels (1989) ("Stolen apples")
- Kriptonemie (1989) ("Cryptonomy")
- Verdraaide raaisels (1990) ("Twisted riddles")
- Die somber muse (1990) ("The sombre muse")
- Tachycardia (1990)
- Die verlore simbool (1991) ("The lost symbol")
- Interne verhuising (1995) ("Internal house moving")
- Ewebeeld (1997) ("Mirror image")
- Lykdigte (2000) ("Memorial poems")
- Ruggespraak (2002) ("Talking back")
- Die buigsaamheid van verdriet (2005) ("The flexibility of sorrow")
- En skielik is dit aand (2006) ("And suddenly it's evening")
- Dad (2006)
- Koesnaatjies vir die proe (2008)
- Vuurwiel (2009) ("Wheel of fire")
- Visums by verstek (2011) ("Visas by default")
- Lot se vrou (2012) ("Lot's wife")
- Meditasies (2013) ("Meditations")
- Matriks (2016) ("Matrix")
- Indeks (2016) ("Index")
- The Coroner's Wife (2018)
- Konfessies, kaarte en konterfeitsels (2021)
- Nomadiese sterre (2021) ("Nomadic Stars")
- Sanctum (2022)
- Asindeton (2025) ("Asyndeton")

== Novels ==
- Swart Koring (1996) ("Black Wheat") (Parody on the pulp romance novel, with a lesbian twist)
- Die Swart Sluier (1998) ("The black veil") (Parody on pulp detective novels and ghost stories)
- Judaskus (1998) ("Judas Kiss")
- Sewe Sonjas en wat hulle gedoen het (2001) ("Seven Sonyas and what they did") (An electronic novel published by Contentlot.com))
- Skoppensboer (2001) ("Jack of Spades": this refers to a poem by Eugene Marais, that calls the grim reaper by this name)
- Palindroom (2008) ("Palindrome")
- Kladboek (2008) ("Notebook")
- Stasies: 'n Speurverhaal (2023) ("Stations: A Mystery")

== Criticism ==
- Psigoanalise en lees (1989) ("Psychoanalysis and reading")
- Postmodernisme (1995) ("Postmodernism")
