= Ingrid Jonker =

South African poet

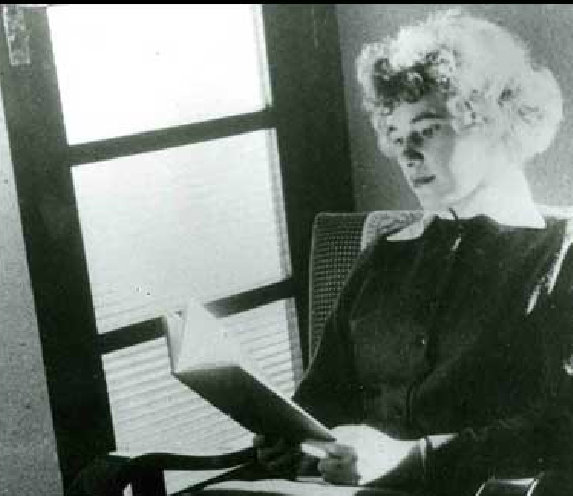
- Ingrid Jonker in 1956
- Born: 19 September 1933; Douglas, Northern Cape, South Africa
- Died: 19 July 1965 (aged 31); Three Anchor Bay, Cape Town, South Africa
- Education: Wynberg Girls' High School
- Occupation: Writer
- Known for: Poetry
- Spouse: Pieter Venter
- Children: 1

Ingrid Jonker (19 September 1933 – 19 July 1965) OIS was a South African poet and accomplished figure in modern Afrikaans literature. Her poems have been widely translated into other languages.

Born into an Afrikaner family with 400-year-old roots in South Africa, Jonker grew up in an unstable family. After the death of her mother, she and her sister Anna moved in with their until-then-estranged father, where they encountered significant emotional abuse from their stepmother before both moving out.

During the 1950s and 1960s, which saw the Sharpeville massacre, the increasingly draconian enforcement of Apartheid laws, and escalating terrorism committed both by Government security forces and by the paramilitary wing of the African National Congress, Jonker chose to affiliate herself with Cape Town's racially mixed literary bohemia, which gathered around her fellow Afrikaner poet and literary mentor Uys Krige in the beach-side suburb of Clifton. In both her poems and in newspaper interviews, Jonker denounced the ruling National Party's racial policies and the increasing censorship of literature and the media. This brought her into open conflict with her father, a widely respected Member of Parliament for the ruling Party. In 1965, Jonker's childhood trauma, recent failed marriage, and her disastrous relationships with several different men led to her major depression and finally suicide by drowning. Even so, Jonker has reached iconic status in post-Apartheid South Africa and is often compared with Sylvia Plath and Marilyn Monroe.

== Family origins ==
On both sides of the family, the ancestors of Ingrid Jonker had lived in South Africa for centuries. Her forefather on her father's side, Adolph Jonker, was the son of a plantation owner from Macassar, in the Dutch East Indies, and had emigrated to the Cape Colony during the early 18th century. Adolph Jonker became the schoolteacher and warden of the Dutch Reformed congregation at Drakenstein. In 1740, he married Maria Petronella Langeveld, the daughter of Jacobus Langveld and an unknown woman from the Cape.

Ingrid's father Abraham Jonker (1905–1966), was born on 22 April 1905 on the Kalkfontein farm, in the Boshoff district of the former Orange Free State. In 1910, Abraham lost his older sister to drowning. As he later recalled, "I wasn't five years old yet and she drowned in the Vaal River at the age of eight, on the same day that King Edward VII died, because I still remember well how all the flags were hanging half-mast when we went to fetch the little coffin in town the following day with the hooded cart – the day my late father came to wake us at four o'clock to see Halley's Comet that was clearly visible in the sky. We all felt so awful, because my late sister's little body was still lying in the house."

After graduating high school in 1922, Jonker studied at the University of Stellenbosch between 1923 and 1930. He obtained a Bachelor's Degree, majoring in Ancient Greek and Dutch and in theology. Jonker's theological studies, were, however, more out of a desire to please his parents than out of any real interest. In 1928, Jonker was awarded the theological candidates diploma with honours.

According to a December 1966 article by Jack Cope in the London Magazine, Ingrid's, "mother, Beatrice Cilliers, came from an old Huguenot family, with generations of intellectual attainments."

While the ancestors of the Cilliers family had left France in order to continue practicing their Calvinist faith, Ingrid's grandfather, Stephanie "Swart Fanie" ("Black Stevie") was known for his indifference to religious practice and mockery of dignified local Dutch Reformed ministers. Ingrid's grandmother, Annie Retief Cilliers (1873–1957), was a devoutly religious woman who enjoyed preaching to coloured people. She attended the Apostolic Church, because they were so "lively and jolly", as Ingrid later wrote.

Ingrid's sister, Anna Jonker, later wrote, "The one story Ingrid always wanted to hear, was how it happened that Oupa married Ouma. Ouma had been in love with Oupa's brother, but he had the habit of crowing like a rooster – and the Ouma would crow, to let us hear what it sounded like – so she decided to marry Swart Fanie. The story always ended with, 'And I used to think he wouldn't be that foolish!'"

Also according to Anna Jonker, "Swart Fanie" had "a fiery temperament" and once "tore up the documentary proof that the English had commandeered virtually all his mules and wagons during the Anglo-Boer War and hurled them back at an English officer."

Beatrice Catharina Cilliers (1905–1944), the daughter of "Swart Fanie" and Anna Cilliers, met Abraham Jonker while she was studying music at the University of Stellenbosch and married him in 1930.

After their marriage, Abraham Jonker first worked as a travelling organiser for the National Party before becoming a journalist in Cape Town for such publications as Burger, Die Huisgenoot, Jongspan, and Suiderstem. Jonker also obtained a doctorate with honours in Afrikaans literature. He also started his own bilingual magazine, Die Monitor, which he sold himself in order to, as he put it, dedicate himself exclusively to journalism and literature.

Abraham Jonker also published books and short story collections during the early 1930s. Louise Viljoen writes, "The critical response to his literary work remained lukewarm, perhaps because of his preference for the European-inspired Nuwe Saaklikheid ("Modern Objectivity") was very different from the confessional mode newly popular in Afrikaans literature at the time. Because of the sombre worldview reflected in his writing, Ingrid Jonker's Dutch biographer Henk van Woerden typecast him as a secular Calvinist and described him as an aloof, panic-stricken Puritan." By his own admission, however, Abraham Jonker had never expected or desired immortality as a writer and always considered his own poetry substandard. Jonker admitted, however, that the greatest influence, even upon his journalistic output, and from who, "I learned that clear simplicity in whatever needs to be said", was Omar Khayyam, "with whom I first became acquainted at the age of twelve or thirteen and to whose work I always return, even though I have loved a great deal of the world's poets since then."

By 1933, Abraham and Beatrice Jonker were part of a circle of Cape Town intellectuals who "joined the old Cape traditions of discussing cultural, political, and social matters." Gladstone Louw later described "the writer and journalist Abraham Jonker" as "intelligent, but surly and then already frustrated". At the same time, however, Abraham and Beatrice Jonker would often perform duets together at social gatherings. Beatrice played the piano, while Abraham performed upon the violin.

There were serious troubles, however, in the Jonkers' marriage. Ingrid's half-brother, Koos Jonker, later recalled, "Beatrice, Ingrid's mother, suffered from hallucinations and sometimes acted irrationally – even before she left my father."

Family friend W.A. de Klerk later recalled, "I would say Ingrid's incapacity to find any happiness on a personal level should be seen in terms of her own broken home background. Her father was not an easy man. He often became violent... My wife remembers the evenings very well when Ingrid's mother fled the house with Annatije as a small child."

== Early life ==
Ingrid Jonker was born on her maternal grandfather's farm near Douglas, Northern Cape, on 19 September 1933. Shortly before her birth, Ingrid's mother Beatrice and her older sister Anna had left Abraham H. Jonker's house in the Cape Town suburb of Vredehoek, after Abraham Jonker allegedly accused his wife of adultery during an argument and suggested that her unborn daughter was not his child.

Beatrice and Anna Jonker first found refuge at the home of a neighbour, J.A. Smith. Then, mother and daughter left for Beatrice's parent's farm, known as "Swart Fanie".

According to Louise Viljoen, "A letter survived in which Beatrice firmly rejects Abraham's plea that she returns to him."

Ingrid and Anna's childhood was spent on small farms owned by their grandfather.

Ingrid later wrote, "At the time my father was not with the family and my grandfather Fanie Cilliers, a top joke teller, paralyzed and bedridden for 15 years, but the wittiest person I ever knew, ruled the house in his own exuberant way."

Anna Jonker later claimed about "Swart Fanie", "He had been paralyzed for many years and during his last years he was completely bedridden. But there, in his large bedroom with doors leading onto the veranda, he entertained his friends until the pipe-smoke hung blue in the air. The loud laughing, the pranks, the stories attracted us children; Ingrid would crawl in behind Oupa's back, from where Ouma would come and fetch her when the stories got too rough."

Anna further recalled, "Ingrid was always Ouma's child. Ouma Annie Retief, pretty Annie (Mooi Annie) from Paarl, a fine slender woman with eyes flecked with green, that often sparkled, but could at times look quite stern."

Jonker's grandparents moved to a farm near Durbanville.

Anna later recalled, "It was in Durbanville, I think, that Ingrid was baptised. She was three or four years old and the family was just as upset about that as about the unusual name she was given. Mamma found the name in a book and that was that; as she would always say. Mamma was always being different, the family used to say, and who has heard of a child baptised in a garden? Ingrid wore a pretty white dress and there were cakes, tea and many people. I was so jealous that I hid in the neighbours' garden and watched it all through the fence."

As girls Ingrid and Anna were often taken to visit their grandmother's wealthy relatives, who owned vineyards in Paarl. Anna later recalled, "We often went to visit the family in Paarl. The oldest people we knew were Ouma's mother and aunt, while lived in Hillside in Paarl. We were overwhelmed by the grand house and quite taken aback by the degree of cleanliness expected of us. To us it felt as if we had to wash our hands a hundred times a day, and that just to be given some of the delicious food or at most two or three of the pretty little biscuits. Great-grandmother believed that girls should be little ladies. We sat on pouffes with our little ankles crossed, trying not to laugh at the funny name of the seat, while they solemnly proceeded to establish family ties."

Anna also recalled of her father, "Abraham came to see us in Durbanville, but it upset my mother so much to see him that Oupa said he must stay away."

During the same visit, Abraham brought a red top as a gift for Ingrid, but otherwise refused to acknowledge her presence.

According to Anna, "Then the gossip started in Stellenbosch. Ingrid never knew about it."

Ingrid later wrote, "The house that I do remember, is the one in Durbanville, where we lived until I was about five years old. I will always remember how my laughing grandfather encouraged me to ride faster and faster on my tricycle until I fell off – and my grandmother would come and calm us down. 'Oh, Fanie, is there nothing I can do about your liveliness? Look how you're egging the child on. And she's already like a little devil.'"

In 1938, her grandfather Fanie Cilliers died, leaving the four women destitute. Ingrid later recalled, "Then one morning when I woke up, my sister came to me and said, 'Do you know what? Oupa is dead. His room is full of wreaths.' I heard something about his death years later from Ouma: 'Babs,' (that was her nickname for me) 'the night your grandfather died, he called me to his bed and said, 'Annie, I love you, because you carried my burdens.'"

== The Strand and Gordon's Bay ==
In the aftermath, the family moved to the Strand. Ingrid later recalled, "Those days the Strand was little more than a fishing village. Now I had to go to church and to Sunday school. It didn't take me long to learn the nicest hymns by heart. For me these songs contained the structure, rhythm, and mystery of poetry. Inspired by this and by my grandmother's loving care, I started writing verses. My first 'poetry' appeared in the school magazine. I was six then. Ouma recited them to the Coloured community that lived on the outskirts of the Strand, where she used to go and teach them Bible lessons after Sunday school. I still remember how hard it was for me to walk down that long dirt road, holding Ouma's hand, her jokes along the way and the glimmer in her deep green eyes when she looked down at me. She could not have been more than five feet tall herself. I would stand to one side of her pulpit in front of the Coloured community, and Ouma and I and the entire congregation would end up in tears as hymn after heart-stirring hymn was sung."

Anna later recalled, "Ingrid and I didn't realize how poor we were. We knew Ouma had to be careful with money, and that her two sons, A.C. Cilliers of the University of Stellenbosch, and uncle Jacob, the attorney from Boksburg, sent her money every month. My father also sent a few pounds every month, and later Ouma got a pension – seventeen pounds a month, I remember. Mama was often ill and stayed in bed for long periods, but on a few occasions she went to work for a few months at a time. Once she worked at the SABC and we teased her because she liked Gideon Roos so much."

They moved later to Gordon's Bay. In 1940, Ingrid began attending kindergarten.

According to Viljoen, "Their mother and grandmother allowed them greater freedom and mobility than was usual for the time. During their stay in Gordon's Bay, they often wandered off into a pine forest on their way to school, to sit and read their books. Once they stayed away from school for so long that that their teacher thought that the family had moved again. Here, they were also allowed to keep small animals and continued exploring the veld and beach. They picked fruit from plants in the veld, gathered shellfish from the rock pools, played with tadpoles in the stream behind their house and buried small objects called 'secrets' in the ground. It is not surprising that Gordon's Bay is one of the spaces that would later gain symbolic importance in Ingrid's poetry."

Anna later recalled, "Ingrid and I were playing on the carpet and Mama and Ouma were watching us. Ingrid looked up and I heard Mama say, 'How could he say she isn't his child? She has the same broken-hearted look in her eyes.' Ingrid was about six or seven. She never forgot those words; never spoke about it, but she must have started realising then why she was Ouma's heartache child. Many years later, during her breakdown, psychiatrists determined that she was emotionally only seven years old "

A further shadow was cast over this idyllic time by the increasing mental illness of Ingrid's mother. While they lived in the flat in Gordon's Bay, Beatrice Jonker suffered a mental breakdown. Anna later recalled of her mother, "She went on loving Pa and never spoke ill of him, but she didn't want to see him. Once we found her at the window, tugging at a piece of string and repeating over and over, 'There comes Aben. There comes Aben.' She was taken to Valkenberg and given a sleep cure. All I remember about Ingrid on the day that Mama was suddenly not there anymore were her enormous, frightened eyes. But as usual, Ingrid said nothing, with her everything turned inwards."

The trauma of this experience affected Ingrid deeply and strengthened her bond with her grandmother, who was the only person with whom she could talk to about it.

Soon after her mental breakdown, Beatrice Jonker was also diagnosed with cancer. Anna Jonker later recalled, "She wanted to join the war effort and she had to see a doctor first. That evening she cried bitterly and Ouma, too. Then Mama did something that upset Ouma very much, but that she couldn't or wouldn't stop. Mama went to see the Catholic priests and often went to them to find out more about their religion." Both Ingrid and Beatrice's mother, who had both been raised in the anti-Catholicism that was still deeply ingrained within Afrikaner Calvinism, were devastated and feared that Beatrice, "would go to Hell, like all Roman Catholics." In response, Ingrid and Annie Cilliers, "prayed and read", the passages from the Book of Revelation about the Scarlet Woman, whom they believed to represent the Roman Catholic Church.

As Beatrice Jonker lay dying, Ingrid and Anna visited their mother as often as possible. They often shared news with her about boys that they felt unable to discuss with their devout grandmother. After two years in hospital, Beatrice Jonker died of cancer on 6 August 1944.

Ingrid later wrote, "My moeder, sterwend, was so sonnig soos 'n liewenheersbesie, so geheime, so verassend, so teer." ("My mother, dying, was as sunny as a ladybird, so full of secrets, so surprising, so tender.")

Anna Jonker later recalled, "The four of us, Ouma, uncle A.C., Ingrid and I, buried Mama. It was raining and there were some other men in black, that Ouma said were undertakers."

According to Louise Viljoen, "Beatrice's death brought an end to Ingrid's life within the intimacy of the maternal family."

Anna Jonker later wrote, "Ouma was to take care of us until Pa would fetch us at the end of 1944. To us he was a complete stranger. Before his arrival he had someone ask if there was anything we needed, and we wrote asking for Bibles. Ingrid really wanted a Bible and that, together with the spinning top when she was a baby, were the only presents she received from Pa in her childhood days. Shortly before he was to come and fetch us, I wrote secretly and said we wouldn't be able to go, because we should rather stay with Ouma and go to school at Hottentots Holland or somewhere, because we didn't have smart enough clothes for the Cape."

As Anna writes, however, "He came at the end of 1944. We got into the car, and Ingrid wouldn't let go of Ouma's hand through the open window. She sat at the back and kept looking around at Ouma's little black figure at the side of the road. The road was to lead through the grey teen years in the cold house of our stepmother, through the disillusionment of Ingrid's adult life."

== The House in Plumstead ==
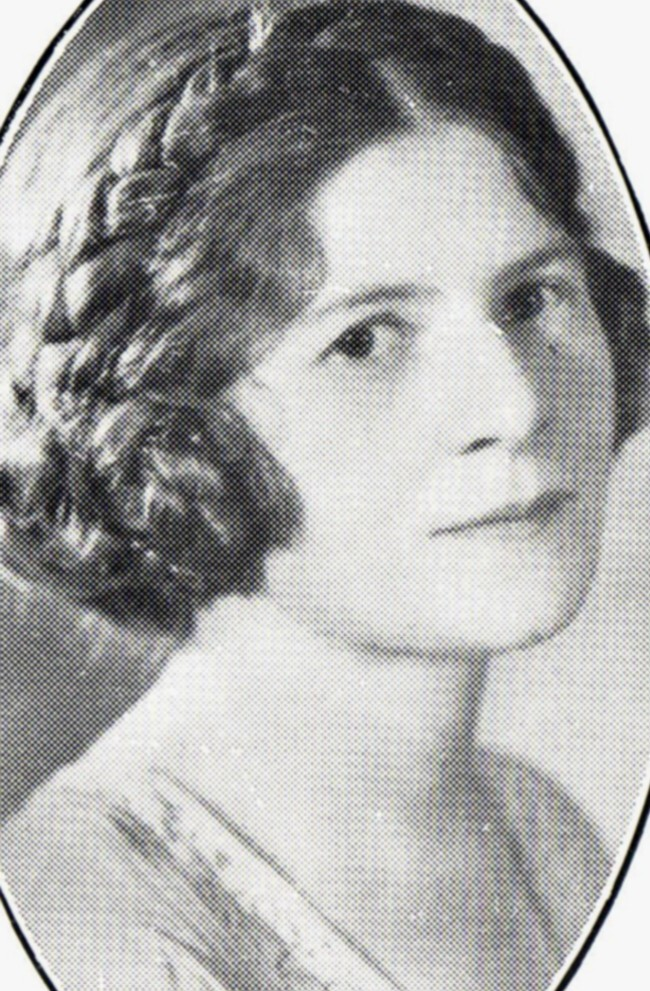
Ingrid Jonker's stepmother, Lulu Brewis.

Until the death of their mother, Anna and Ingrid's contact with their father had been minimal. In the years since his divorce from Beatrice, Abraham Jonker had briefly married one Barbara Gill. His third marriage was to Lulu Brewis, an author of children's books, in 1941.

Abraham's son by Lulu, Adolf Jakobus "Koos" Jonker, recalls, "My mother wasn't always easy. When she married my father, she was a spinster of forty-one. She taught for years with a friend – and they went to England together. There they met a new friend, who came to South Africa with them. She wasn't fond of children – and my mother herself had a similar strong streak. So we always had White governesses." He further recalls, "In 1944, when my father went to fetch Anna and Ingrid, the house in Rondebosch became too small for The whole family. They lodged with people for a while..."

Anna elaborates, "Life in the city was not that hard. We lodged with people at Tamboerskloof for a few months and attended Jan van Riebeeck School. Ingrid was in primary school and I was in high school." From their boarding house, the Jonker girls could walk to their school, which stood on the slopes of Table Mountain.

Every Sunday, Abraham Jonker would pick his daughters up from the boarding house and bring them to spend the day with him, their stepmother Lulu, and the infant Koos. Sometimes, Lulu would join her husband and stepdaughters for the evening drive back to Tamboerskloof. During the drive, Anna and Ingrid would lean up against Lulu, who would tell them stories. Anna later recalled, "We were pleased that she liked us and we were quite prepared to accept her as mother. We didn't want to call her Mamma, but decided on Mamie, and she understood our attitude."

Within six months, Abraham purchased a larger house in Plumstead and his daughters moved in with him permanently. Almost immediately, Anna and Ingrid's relationship with Lulu changed. Anna later recalled, "One of the first things that Lulu's mother said to me was that there were very important guests coming to dinner and that Ingrid and I should eat in the kitchen. We didn't mind, because we wouldn't have been able to talk politics with the grownups in any case. We were quite happy to eat in the kitchen with the little ones, who at the time were still babies. But then she went up the stairs and said, 'We feel – we feel- you grew up in the back streets. You will put your father to shame at the table.' Ouma lived until just before Ingrid got married, but we saw very little of her. She was coming to visit us in the big house in Plumstead, for example, shortly after we had gone to live in Cape Town. But then – the night before we were to fetch Ouma – my stepmother said no, we can't fetch her, because her mother was also coming to Cape Town and there wouldn't be enough space at the table!"

Huibrecht Steenkamp said, "I soon saw that Lulu was just the kind of stepmother I had expected her to be. They were completely deprived, those two children – Ingrid and Anna. Their father was heavily involved in politics at the time. He was a member of parliament and was often away from home. He really led a very busy life."

According to Louise Viljoen, "Although Abraham Jonker has been portrayed as the archetypal Apartheid politician in the minds of those who know of the political tension that existed between him and his daughter, he had a chequered political career. In the election that brought D.F. Malan's National Party to power in 1948, he won a seat in Parliament as a member of General Smuts's United Party. Together with other dissidents he formed the Conservative Party in 1954, but crossed the floor in 1956 to join the National Party. Many of his contemporaries spoke of him as a political opportunist and a turncoat. Whether Abraham Jonker's changing political views were the result of careerism or inner conviction, they would bring him into open confrontation with his daughter."

According to Anna, however, "Before her marriage Ingrid was a very spiritual and idealistic young girl, without strong political convictions. Because when Pa was Pro-United Party, we all helped to canvass. And the next year, we would canvass again and the people would say, 'Weren't you working for a different Party last year?' It was very embarrassing, you know."

According to psychologist L.M. van der Merwe, "Anna Jonker points out that their father was happy to have his older daughters at home with him and that he tried his best to minimize the friction between them and their stepmother. But he was often away and the girls soon noticed that their complaints only led to further friction. They started keeping quiet and their father no longer enquired."

At other times, Abraham was complicit in his wife's mistreatment of his daughters. Anna later recalled, "They sat at the head of the table and we sat at the bottom, below the salt. When they had a leg of lamb, we ate mince. They had fruit, but we did not. They had sweets, but that we weren't allowed. They would go for Sunday drives, but there wouldn't be space for us two in the huge big car."

Steenkamp describes Ingrid as "totally vulnerable" while Anna could "stand her own ground", being the favourite. Both Anna and Ingrid were used to wandering on their own and always speaking their minds. But, according to their stepmother's friend, Ena de Klerk, "Lulu wanted to keep them at home, to protect them and shape them into a religious mold. This caused clashes between her and the girls. It was not so much that she was unfair to them, inherently Lulu Brevis was a good person. Anna and Ingrid were vagabonds, they roamed the beaches from an early age. They knew absolutely nothing about a home life."

According to Steenkamp, however, "That is the kind of attitude those people had towards the children. They were raised perfectly well, for goodness sake! Their mother raised them, and she came from one of the best families in Paarl! How could they have said the children had grown up in the back streets?"

While living in Plumstead, Ingrid and Anna attended Wynberg Girls' High School, where teaching was in English rather than Afrikaans. School records reveal Ingrid to have been a well behaved but average student, who preferred to devote herself only to those subjects she liked. Her writing was praised by her teachers and she began writing poetry for the school magazine.

Ingrid later recalled, "By now my poems started appearing in the Jongspan and in our school magazines. My head teacher, Miss Currie, indignant about my satiric verses about the school teachers, reprimanded me, placed me in my sister's care, washed her hands of me and was the first person to tell me, 'You are undisciplined and disobedient, but my goodness you have talent!'"

According to Louise Viljoen, "Although there was no love lost between the two girls and their stepmother, they had a good relationship with their much younger stepsiblings, Koos and Suzanne."

By 1951, Ingrid wanted to move out. Anna later recalled how she travelled from Johannesburg, where she was working at the time, to help Ingrid obtain permission from their father to leave the house in Plumstead. "We couldn't speak to him at the house... so we went for a drive in his car and told him how unhappy we were there. Then he said, 'But it's such a nice large home', and he got so angry we thought he would kill us. So we said there might be room in the house, but there's no room in the heart. Then he agreed that Ingrid could go and live in a room in the city."

== Poet ==
At the age of sixteen, Ingrid Jonker submitted her first collection of poems, Na die somer ("After the summer") to Nasionale Boekhandel. After reading the collection, the company's reader, D.J. Opperman noted, "This poet is busy tuning her lyre."

Soon after, Opperman, invited Ingrid to come and discuss her poems with him over tea.

In a letter to N.P. van Wyk Louw, Opperman wrote, "Abr Jonker has a daughter: Ingrid, 16 yrs old, who has some talent. I'll be discussing her poems with her on Tuesday. Must be from the first wife? Cilliers & Jonker blood?"

At the time, Opperman lectured in Afrikaans at the University of Cape Town and acted as a selector of poetry anthologies for several publishers. Accordingly, Opperman was one of the foremost South African poets of his time and was a hugely influential figure in Afrikaans literature.

Ingrid, therefore, later recalled, "I knew most his published poems by heart. I was excited and slightly fearful, but I was immediately made to feel at ease by his earnestness and calmness and most of all, the brilliant eyes that didn't scoff at me."

During a genteel conversation over tea, Opperman and Jonker went through the entire book, poem by poem. Ingrid later recalled, "Of course it was turned down, but he gave me very valuable advice. After that I regularly sent him poems and he would comment on them and encourage me."

On two occasions in 1951, she again sent him poems on which Opperman both commented and urged her to send more.

According to Louise Viljoen, "Some of these poems (for instance Skrik and Keuse) include veiled hints at romantic longing and an awakening sexuality, often reigned in by feelings of religious guilt. It is difficult to reconstruct the inner life of the adolescent Ingrid on the basis of these poems, because the expression of feeling in them is still guarded, hemmed in by schoolgirl decorum and the writerly rhetoric of a previous generation of Afrikaans poets."

Many of Ingrid's close friends would later comment on the fact that she did not have the opportunity to attend university. Some blamed her father for this, while others believe that it was due to the influence of her stepmother, Lulu Jonker. It is known that, after she left her father's house in Plumstead, Abraham Jonker paid for Ingrid to take a secretarial course, which enabled her to support herself and become independent.

With her secretarial skills, Ingrid obtained a job working for the Kennis publishing house at the Here XVII Building in downtown Cape Town by late in 1952. She used the money to rent a small apartment above the sea in the suburb of Clifton, which she shared with her close friend, Jean "Bambi" du Preez.

Ingrid's real passion, however, was for her vocation as a poet. She later recalled, "I became an office worker, but the real thing I lived for was to write."

She continued sending her poems to popular magazines like Die Huisgenoot, Naweekpos, and Rooi Rose, as well as the literary journal Standpunte. As she did so, her poems became increasingly more sophisticated and polished. She also took lessons in elocution, acting, and in sculpting from her father's friend Florencio Cuairan.

According to Louise Viljoen, "It comes as no surprise, when one listens to tape recordings of her reading her own poetry, what impresses one is the clarity of her diction and articulation. Her voice is that of a cultured woman, calm and confident. Although she gave the impression of being vulnerable and defenseless, there must also have been a measure of resilience and determination in her character to have enabled her to overcome the deprivation of her early years and develop artistically and socially after she left her father's house."

In August 1953, she recited poems at the Cape Eisteddfod and received a Diploma for Achievement in Afrikaans.

Her first published book of poems, Ontvlugting ("Escape"), was published in 1956. It had originally been submitted to HAUM publishing house on Long Street in Cape Town, but was turned down. The first edition was published instead by Aat Kaptein's newly established Culemborg Publishers and printed in the Netherlands. Upon being given a copy and told that it was dedicated to him, Abraham Jonker replied, "My child, I hope its not just a cover; I hope there is something inside as well. Tonight I'll have a look at how you've shamed me."

== Dissident ==
Her father, already a writer, editor and National Party Member of Parliament, was appointed chairman of the parliamentary select committee responsible for censorship laws on art, publications and entertainment. To Abraham Jonker's embarrassment, his daughter was vehemently opposed to the censorship laws he was charged with enforcing and their political differences became public. With a speech in parliament he disowned her as his daughter.

The depression caused by her father's rejection of her forced Ingrid to enter the Valkenberg Psychiatric Hospital in 1961.

Jonker's next collection of poems Rook en oker ("Smoke and Ochre") was published in 1963 after delays caused by her publishers. While the anthology was praised by most South African writers, poets and critics, it was given a cool reception by supporters of the ruling Party.

Thereafter, Ingrid Jonker became known as one of the Die Sestigers, a group that also included Breyten Breytenbach, André Brink, Adam Small and Bartho Smit, who were challenging the extreme Afrikaner nationalism of the ruling National Party.

Rook en oker won Jonker the £1000 Afrikaanse Pers-Boekhandel (Afrikaans Press-Booksellers) Literary Award, as well as a scholarship from the Anglo American Corporation. The money helped her to realize her dream of travelling to Europe, where she went to England, the Netherlands, France, Spain and Portugal. She asked Jack Cope to accompany her, but he refused. Jonker then asked André Brink to join her. He accepted and they went to Paris and Barcelona together. During the trip Brink decided against leaving his wife for Jonker and went back to South Africa. Jonker then cut her tour short and returned to Cape Town.

Jonker had started writing a new collection of poems just before her death. A selection of these poems was published posthumously in the collection Kantelson ("Toppling Sun"). She then witnessed a shattering event: a black baby was shot by white soldiers and died in his mother's arms. She underlined from Dylan Thomas: "after the first death, there is no other". She wrote Die kind (wat doodgeskiet is deur soldate by Nyanga) ("The child (who was shot dead by soldiers at Nyanga)"). This is to be The Whole Truth!

== Personal life ==
=== Pieter Venter ===
Ingrid Jonker met Pieter Venter, her future husband, at a bohemian party held at Sea Point in 1954. Venter, who was 15 years Ingrid's senior, worked in Cape Town as the sales manager for a company that took foreign tourists on African safaris. Venter also wrote poetry in English and was a close friend of Afrikaans poet Uys Krige and Breyten Breytenbach.

After Abraham Jonker walked his daughter, who wore a white dress, down the aisle and gave her away, Piet and Ingrid Venter were married inside the Congregational Church in Paarl on 15 December 1956.

Their daughter Simone was born, allegedly with minimal labour pains, on 1 December 1957.

The couple moved to Johannesburg, but three years later they separated. Jonker and her daughter then moved back to Cape Town.

=== Other relationships ===
During the same time period she had relationships with two writers, Jack Cope and André Brink.

== Death ==
During the night of 19 July 1965, Ingrid Jonker went down to the beach at Three Anchor Bay in Cape Town, walked into the sea, and committed suicide by drowning.

The news of Ingrid's death devastated, but didn't shock, those who knew her. Jack Cope and Uys Krige were asked to identify the body. Afterwards, Cope wrote in his diary, "Darling I failed you. There is only one irreparable fault – to lack faith, to lose courage, to be smaller than one's love – I love you a million times."

Anna Jonker later recalled, "When I got to Jack that morning, he was sitting at a table, surrounded by all the other writers – friends – and all the hatred was focused on him. They all blamed him."

André Brink was in Pretoria at the time and went blind for several hours from the shock of hearing the news.

According to Marjorie Wallace, "Abraham Jonker was on a hunting trip when Ingrid died. When he was eventually tracked down, he said, 'As far as I'm concerned, they can throw her back into the sea.'"

However, Ingrid's half-brother, Koos Jonker, insists that there is no truth to this. According to Koos, "My father reportedly made some heartless remark when he heard of Ingrid's death. But at the same time I was with him on a hunting trip in the Eastern Cape and I was standing next to him when the farmer's son came and told us that Ingrid had drowned. My father was very shocked. He didn't say anything except that we should leave immediately. At that stage he was on a very good footing with Ingrid. She often went to visit him in St. James."

Simone was sent via aeroplane to her father and stepmother in Johannesburg and only learned of her mother's death after she arrived.

Psychologist L.M. van der Merwe has written, "Shortly before her death she underlined a verse by Dylan Thomas, 'After the first death, there is no other' ... Thereby she confirmed that the farewell had taken place long before 19 July 1965. But the physical deed committed that morning makes it very difficult to maintain perspective, to judge the value of her influence, because on that day a legend was born."

Laurens van der Post later said about Ingrid, "Her suicide to me is almost like the suicide of Afrikanerdom... She was rejected by her father, her people and her lover, even Uys so self-absorbed in his own emotions... I was so horrified... By the dangers of her childlike vulnerability that I wrote to Jack Cope and begged him to come over and fetch her from Europe and offered to pay his fare... But once Jack had her, he just gave her cold pieces of his cold mind in return. He was the only person... who could have saved her. Perhaps he tried, I do not know. I may be unfair...she needed, as we all do, and some of us thank God get, a loving and understanding human heart to take us in."

Ingrid's sister Anna Jonker and her bohemian friends had originally planned a secular funeral, at which Ingrid's poems were to be read aloud. Instead, Abraham Jonker, who was outraged by the idea, overruled his daughter Anna and took control of the arrangements. According to the newspapers, Abraham Jonker was determined to keep his daughter's funeral from becoming a protest against the regime, but in this Jonker was almost certainly acting under orders from his Party's Chief Whip in the South African Parliament. When the funeral took place on 22 July 1965, there was no church service, but a Dutch Reformed minister, Rev. J.L. van Rooyen, officiated at the graveside. Ingrid's sister Anna boycotted the funeral in protest against the change to the arrangements. At the funeral, the mourners were divided. On one hand were the Jonker family, their friends, and a group of Special Branch detectives. On the other were Ingrid's friends from Cape Town's literary bohemia.

According to Marjorie Wallace, Lulu Jonker approached her stepdaughter's friends and told them that those under banning orders would be arrested if any of Ingrid's poem's were read aloud, as that would turn the funeral into a political gathering. Jack Cope sobbed uncontrollably and had to be held back from throwing himself toward the coffin as it was lowered into the ground. After the Jonker family left, Ingrid's friends threw flowers into the grave. Cope tossed in a wreath of wild olive that he had picked on the slope above Clifton. André Brink chose not to attend the funeral, as he felt it would turn what deserved to be a private event into a public spectacle.

Following her religious funeral, Ingrid's friends held a secular funeral for her on 25 July 1965. Before more than a hundred mourners, Uys Krige spoke about Ingrid's poetry and Jan Rabie read some of her poems aloud. This time, Ingrid's sister Anna attended. Jan le Roux, a high school teacher from Riviersonderend, wished to take his students, who loved Ingrid's poetry, to the funeral. After being refused permission to attend by both the school principal and the local Dutch Reformed minister, the pupils held a private prayer service for Ingrid Jonker, at which her poems were read aloud.

After the death of his daughter, Abraham Jonker's health went into rapid decline. In October 1965, he disinherited his daughter Anna after she refused to hand Ingrid's letters to André Brink over to him. He began drinking alcohol heavily, though doctors had warned that it could kill him. Anna later recalled, "He wasn't allowed to drink and he was hardly sober. After Ingrid's death he went through hell – he went through absolute hell. It was Christmas and he had thrombosis in his leg... Lulu didn't want to allow me to see him, can you believe it?! But a nurse told me later on that Abraham was calling, 'Ingrid! Ingrid!' He wouldn't stop calling her name. Then Lulu said something and my father hit her so hard that she flew right across the ward!"

Abraham Jonker died of an aneurysm in his aorta on 10 January 1966, six months after the suicide of his daughter. After his death, Koos overruled his father's will and saw to it that Anna received the inheritance to which she was originally due, as well as their father's violin and additional financial support.

Koos Jonker has since said of his father, "My father wasn't such a tough customer. In many ways he was quite gentle. Sometimes I wonder how someone who is seemingly so 'bad' could be elected to Parliament four times. He was well respected, not only by his constituency, but by the general public. I was privileged to have had a father like Abraham Jonker."

When she was interviewed for a documentary many years later, Simone Venter acknowledged the psychological damage caused since her childhood by her mother's suicide. Even so, she conceded, "She wanted to die. It was something she had thought about very deeply. It was her choice."

== Legacy ==
=== Copyright and papers ===
After Jonker's death, copyrights and control of her literary estate and papers were awarded to Jack Cope by the Master of the Court. He established the Ingrid Jonker Trust. He remained a trustee of the Trust until his death in 1991. Jonker's daughter Simone Venter is the beneficiary. Copyright is still vested in the Trust.

Jonker's literary papers went to the National English Literary Museum (NELM) in Grahamstown. Her sister Anna Jonker borrowed these with the intention of writing a biography on her sister.

=== Literary legacy ===
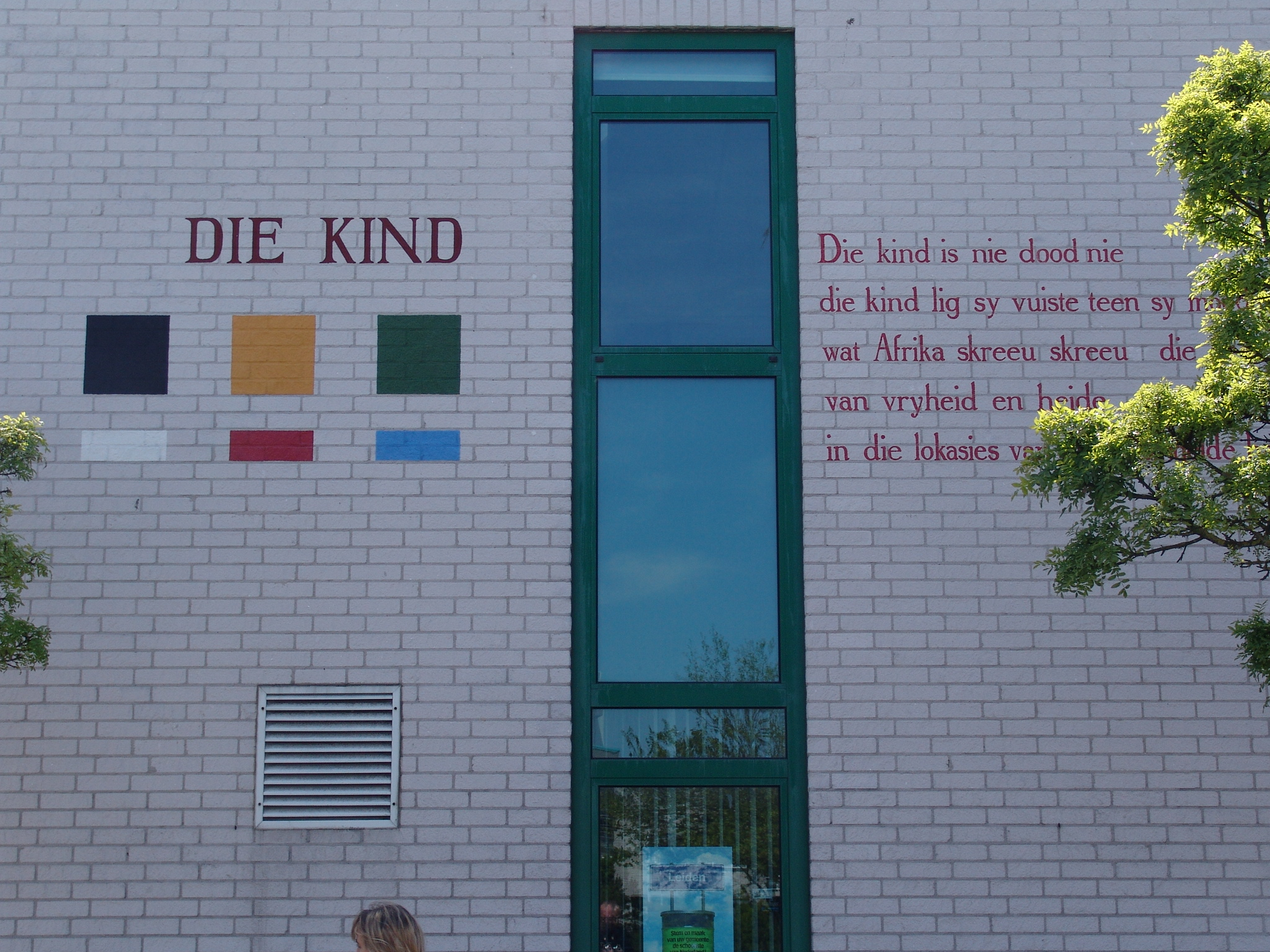
Die Kind as a wall poem in Leiden

Jonker's poetry has been translated from Afrikaans into English, German, French, Dutch, Polish, Hindi and Zulu, among others. She wrote a one-act play 'n Seun na my Hart ("A son after my heart") about a mother's illusions about her handicapped son. Jonker also wrote several short stories.

The prestigious Ingrid Jonker Prize for the best debut work of Afrikaans or English poetry was instituted by her friends to honour her legacy after her burial in 1965. This yearly prize, consisting of R10.000 and a medal, is awarded alternately to an Afrikaans or English poet who has published a first volume in the previous two years backed by Dagbreek Uitgewers.

At the opening of the first democratically elected Parliament of South Africa on 24 May 1994, Nelson Mandela praised Jonker's role as a critic of Apartheid and suggested that her suicide was an extreme protest against a nation that refused to hear her. Mandela then read Jonker's poem, Die kind (wat doodgeskiet is deur soldate by Nyanga) ("The child (who was shot dead by soldiers at Nyanga)") in English translation.

=== In popular culture ===
In 2001 a documentary about Jonker was produced for Dutch television by Saskia van Schaik: Korreltjie niks is my dood.

In 2002 the one-woman, interactive play by Ryk Hattingh, Opdrag: Ingrid Jonker ("Assignment: Ingrid Jonker"), was staged at the Grahamstown National Arts Festival starring Jana Cilliers. The play dealt with questions and comments on Jonker's life, interwoven with her poems and other writing.

In April 2004 Jonker was posthumously awarded the Order of Ikhamanga by the South African government for "her excellent contribution to literature and a commitment to the struggle for human rights and democracy in South Africa."

In 2007 a documentary Ingrid Jonker, her Lives and Time by Mozambique-born South African film and documentary director Helena Nogueira was released in South Africa. Hailed as the definitive work on Jonker this is the first literary documentary to receive theatrical release in South Africa.

A number of her poems have been set to music over the years, beginning with the song cycle Vyf liedere for soprano and piano by Stefans Grové (1981), and sung by such artists as Laurika Rauch, Anneli van Rooyen and Chris Chameleon.

In 2003 ddisselblom, an Afrikaans pop group, released an eponymously titled CD containing the track Falkenburg, a very well executed adaptation of Jonker's "Ontvlugting".

In 2005 Chris Chameleon (known better as the lead singer of the South African band Boo!) released the album Ek Herhaal Jou ("I Repeat You"), which consisted of a number of Jonker's poems that he had set to music. The release coincided with the 40th anniversary of Jonker's death. Some of Jonker's poems that inspired Chameleon's songs are Bitterbessie Dagbreek ("Bitterberry Daybreak"), Lied van die gebreekte Riete ("Song of the Broken Reeds") and Ontvlugting ("Escape").

Also, in 2007 work was already underway on a feature film about Ingrid Jonker with the working title All that Breaks. Based on a script by Helena Nogueira workshopped at Johannesburg's Market Theatre, the film focusses on three years in the life of Jonker and the Sestigers who gathered around poet Uys Krige at Clifton in Cape Town. The film is produced by David Parfitt (Shakespeare in Love), Charles Moore (Schindler's List) and Shan Moodley and is directed by Nogueira.

In 2011, Dutch actress Carice van Houten played Ingrid Jonker in the biographical film Black Butterflies, directed by Paula van der Oest. The film also starred Irish actor Liam Cunningham as Jack Cope and Rutger Hauer as Abraham Jonker. Despite being a fully Dutch production about a poet who spoke and wrote in Afrikaans, Black Butterflies was filmed entirely in English.

Also in 2011, South African musician Chris Chameleon released an album of Jonker's works, entitled As Jy Weer Skryf ("If You Write Again").

In 2012, Nicola Haskins choreographed a dance drama which told the life story of Jonker for the National Arts Festival in Grahamstown and then later to be performed at various venues including the University of Pretoria.

Cape Town has the Ingrid Jonker Bridge that crosses over Woodstock, Nelson Mandela Boulevard.

=== Biography ===
Jonker's biographer is Petrovna Metelerkamp, who published Ingrid Jonker – Beeld van 'n digterslewe ("Ingrid Jonker – Image of a Poet's Life") in 2003. This book contains new insights into the poet's life, and includes love letters (some unsent) and an as yet unpublished account of the night of Jonker's death by her friend, Bonnie Davidtsz. Simone, Ingrid's daughter received a once off payment. An English, and updated version of this biography appeared in 2012: Ingrid Jonker – A Poet's Life. The photos and other information came mainly from the Ingrids collection which was sold in 2000 illegally by a family member to Gerrit Komrij where it was kept in Portugal since 2000. Simone has appealed to the heirs for the Komrij heirs for the return of her legacy to South Africa. An Ingrid Jonker Center will be established in Cape Town under the FAK in collaboration with the Vootrekker Monument. Simone will act as curator of the center.
