= Bonaventure Hinwood =

Father Bonaventure Hinwood OFM
- Born: Edward Victor Hinwood; 12 February 1930; Hillbrow, Union of South Africa
- Died: 8 September 2016 (aged 86); Pretoria, South Africa
- Education: University of the Witwatersrand BA 1950, BA(Hons) 1951; St John Vianney Seminary, Pretoria; Antonianum PhD 1964; University of Pretoria MA 1971
- Occupations: Catholic Priest, Professor, Poet, Translator
- Known for: Afrikaans translations and poetry
- Church: Catholic Church
- Ordained: 1960

Bonaventure Hinwood (12 February 1930 – 8 September 2016) was a Roman Catholic priest and Afrikaans poet. Hinwood was the first South African to join the Irish Province of the Franciscan Order in Pretoria, South Africa.

== Conversion to Roman Catholicism ==
Hinwood was baptized as a Methodist and later became an Anglican. He attended the University of the Witwatersrand(Wits), BA degree in History and English in 1950, BA (Hons) in History in 1951 and trained in librarianship. Later, Hindwood discovered the Catholic Church and converted in October 1951.

== Training for the Priesthood ==
Two years later, he felt the calling to become a priest and approached the Irish Province of the Franciscan Order who at the time staffed St John Vianney, the Catholic Seminary in Pretoria, where he trained for the priesthood. Upon his ordination in 1960 in Rome, he took the name Bonaventure and became the first South African to join the Irish Province. He trained in Ireland as novice in Killarney, and in Rome at the Franciscan Antonianum (now also known as the Pontifical University of Saint Anthony), for 11 years (commencing his Doctorate), before returning to South Africa in 1964.

== Return to South Africa ==
He gained an MA in library science at the University of Pretoria in 1971. He served at St John Vianney seminary as Professor of Theology he was formator, a lecturer in Systematic Theology and Academic Dean for over 33 years.

== Awards ==
Hinwood was awarded the Papal Recognition Pro Ecclesia et Pontifice during Mass held at St John Vianney Seminary in Pretoria, South Africa.

== Writings ==
- Race: The Reflections of a Theologian, doctoral writing published in 1964
- The Divisions of Human Knowledge in the Writings of St. Bonaventure, published as an MA Thesis in 1974
- Afrikaans translation of the Book of Psalms
- Afrikaans translation of the Catechism of the Catholic Church
- Between 1981 and 2014, Hinwood published 8 collections of poetry as a contribution to Afrikaans literature.
- The Way Of The Cross
