= Afrikaans folklore =

Afrikaans folklore is the body of traditional literature, music, dance and customs present in Afrikaans-speaking cultures.

== Afrikaans examples of folklore ==
Some of the Afrikaans folklore subjects being taught can be categorized as follows:

=== Humour ===
Bosch points out that there are different aspects of humour which can add to the enjoyment of studying folktales and Afrikaans as an additional language. Experience has shown that the humour expressed and understood by Zulu learners in the additional language classroom consists mostly of imitating comical situations, tone of voice, facial expressions and body language. Additional language learners struggle to appreciate humour that involves the implicit subtlety of word games.

Morain believes kinesics should be part of any learning programme that includes perception and that it can contribute to the understanding of social and intercultural relationships, because those who have "learned" a language without the nonverbal component are seriously handicapped if they intend to interact with living members of the culture instead of with paper and print.

Kinesics comprises understanding and interpreting body language to provide a creative means of communication across borders and add another dimension to the appreciation and expression of humour in the additional language classroom.

One of the functions of folklore is to entertain the audience. Humorous events set in motion by tricksters can contribute to amusement and mental stimulation. Examples are the actions of the "Jakkals en Wolf" characters of Afrikaans folktales which T. O. Honiball portrayed in comic strips and cartoons. Lategan refers to how Honiball used the Jakkals and Wolf stories that he had heard as a child. His stories followed an old tradition of Middle Dutch literature - that of the satirical Van den Vos Reynaerde - and Honiball became the Walt Disney of Afrikaans. He used satire to gently ridicule people and to unmask human frailty among the Afrikaans-speaking society of the day, mocking the eccentric habits and customs of a community.

Cartoons and comics like these are not regarded by all folklore specialists as belonging to folklore, because they do not explicitly include oral traditions. However, since they are based on the "Jakkals en Wolf" intertextual tradition of oral folktales that have been handed down for generations, it could be argued that Honiball's Adoons-hulle (1977) and Wolf en Jakkals van Uilekraal (1978) can indeed be regarded as part of mass-cultural folklore where city life is portrayed by the mass media. Dorson cites Bausinger (1961) who maintains that "we no longer believe that industrialization necessarily implies the end of a specific folk culture, but rather we attempt to trace the modifications and mutations undergone by folk culture in the industrialized and urbanized world."

These comic strips by Honiball provide interesting teaching possibilities in the additional language classroom, especially because of the elements of humour in the animal tricksters, comical situations, body language and language usage (e.g. the nicknames of some of the characters). This argument is in line with Jansen, who is of the opinion that comics and television series should receive the interest of folklorists and should incite them to pursue further the application and significance of the esoteric-exoteric factor in folklore.

=== Magic ===
An Afrikaans story that could be classified as a magic tale in that it portrays the role of magic and the repetition of the number three, is "Die Wolfkoningin" by I.D. du Plessis. Though this story is called a Cape story, since it reflects the culture of people of Malay origin, who are concentrated in the Western Cape (Du Plessis can be regarded as one of South Africa's leading experts on Cape Malay stories). Following Bettelheim, Steenberg would probably regard the story as a fairy tale. It is a story of magic that reflects some aspects of the inner world of human beings. According to Miruka's classification of folktale content, it can be called an imaginary tale.

This imaginary tale has a typically Eastern setting, with a rural atmosphere. There are hunters, a wood, rich landowners ("wazirs") and beautiful ladies ("poeteri"). There is a definite movement from an earthly space (the house of a wood cutter) to a magical space (a dance party and a wolf's den), and ultimately a return to an earthly reality (the house of the wazir). The number three reoccurs in different spatial settings and with respect to different objects, and symbolises the character's search for freedom, identity and fellowship. The main character's incantation in order to release the magical power (where she changes from a wolf into a beautiful lady) also centres on this number. In this context, the symbolism of these objects can stretch "the capacity of both expression and comprehension, and becomes the medium through which some of the most universal, elemental - and intangible - concepts of man are conveyed".

=== The transmission of social and cultural values and traditions ===
Some of the best examples of Afrikaans folklore are stories recorded and written by Minnie Postma, who grew up with and heard these tales told by Sotho people. Using these stories can give effect to a recommendation made by Robinson, namely that the integration of culture in a language programme should be a synthesis between the learner's home culture, the target language's cultural input and the learner as an individual. According to Robinson, intercultural understanding develops from cultural adaptability, that is, 'modifying one's own cultural repertoire'.

An interesting example of an Afrikaans folktale that is situated in an African context and entails the transmission of cultural values, traditions and views, is Postma's story "In die begin". This story explains how things were between woman and man in the beginning. Miller gives a similar account of the same phenomenon in a discussion of a Sotho-Tswana myth called "The First Marriage and the First Bachelor".

Hattingh discusses the validity of Postma's oral transmission in detail and notes that Postma understands and applies the different characteristics of Southern Sotho narratives. Jacottet (1908. in Hatthingh 1994) postulates that this story has its origin in San culture, because the men in the story use bows and arrows, weapons which were never used by the Basotho. In both Postma's and Jacottet's representation of this myth, the woman's identity is established in terms of masculine criteria. However, Postma adds a new dimension. Her narration depicts a woman as an intelligent, creative and innovative being, even if she is the servant of the man. The dialogue in the story is typical of the oral narrative in that dramatic development, rather than description, is preferred. The relationship between male and female is exceptionally harmonious, unlike in most other Southern Sotho narratives.

=== Ecological stories ===
The folktales of Eugène Marais are typical examples of African ecological narratives concerning the relationship between things and people. Marais follows the tradition of San stories, more specifically those that are known as wandering stories, in that songs and poems are included.

In "Die Vaal Koestertjie" we find well-known themes of threatened innocence and beauty, and the weaker character's victory over physical strength and mockery. According to Kannemeyer, this story - with its use of the apostrophe, paradox, inversion and cumulative and progressive parallelism - follows to a great extent the traditional line of fairy-tale literature. A young Koisan girl, Nampti, has a very special relationship with a little bird, which she calls 'her little grey sister' because they are both pipits.

This character fits in very well with Miruka's general description of birds in ecological stories - she seems unfailingly to appear in times of crisis and she acts as a messenger bearing urgent and important messages, more specifically information about the magic formula that can transform and enrich the protagonist. She (the bird) is invincible, being up in the air and out of reach of the antagonists, in this case the other young women. She counsels the protagonist and is her life guardian.

Like other folktales, this story can be used in the language classroom to discuss moral voices, choices, and values like patience and tolerance, even fatalistic benevolence.

=== Idiomatic expressions ===
Language plays an important role in any culture. Hyde observes that people are not necessarily prisoners of their language, but that the way a culture sees the world is nevertheless reflected in its language. In the same vein, Trivedi emphasises the importance of the transmission of values as well as the recognition of emotional problems that the learner might experience (like culture shock and feelings of helplessness), language anxiety and fear of failure, in being unable to understand or interpret the cultural message. The (learned) behaviour and values of learners of an additional language will be challenged through exposure to the culture of the target language. Their critical appreciation will be intensified by listening to Afrikaans folklore.

Miruka mentions an important function of folklore, namely that of mental stimulation. Developmental aspects such as memory training, sensory awareness, analysis and synthesis, as well as affective development can be specifically emphasised in this regard. The development of all mental and other capacities can be enhanced by the use of an Afrikaans folktale full of idiomatic expressions: "Klein Riet-alleen-in-die-roerkuil" by Eugène Marais, which is included in the volume Dwaalstories (1927).

This story by Marais follows the basic pattern of Western European fairy tales and myths in that the San hero (Klein Riet) is given an important task to carry out within a specific time frame. Nolte indicates that the whole story might have developed around a range of Afrikaans idiomatic expressions. These expressions can be regarded as a reflection of the values of the source culture in the classroom for Afrikaans as an additional language. This study by Nolte can serve an important function in helping to overcome the previously mentioned problems that learners of Afrikaans as an additional language often experience.

Idiomatic expressions and the like are very well received and appreciated by additional language learners from African cultures (as experience with Zulu-speaking learners has shown, perhaps because they often have so many of these in their mother tongue. However, because of urbanisation, many idiomatic expressions have been lost in African languages. These learners have a rich instinct for idioms and have often even created new expressions themselves in the additional language context (e.g. 'Matriek is nie matras nie').

=== Praise poems ===
A story like "Lied van die reën" by Eugène Marais is an ideal example of an Afrikaans praise song that could contribute to the integration of cultural aspects of previously marginalised groups in the curriculum to achieve sensitivity. Coming from an African culture, Kamwangamalu is of the opinion that almost every element in a language programme is capable of conveying a cultural message of some sort: "Culture is the socially learned, shared assemblage of practices, perceptions, attitudes, world views, value systems and beliefs that determine the texture of our lives as members of a given community."

According to Mihálik this folktale by Marais, although it was considered to be an indigenous fairy tale, is an example of an African praise song that can be compared with Sotho and Zulu praise songs dedicated to nature. Mihálik refers to Finnegan's view that there is a similarity between African and European folklore and that there is supposedly some primordial source for both. The impression is that Marais got these stories from a certain "old Hendrik" (probably Tswana or Sotho) during his visits to the Waterberge.

=== Ogre characters ===
A folktale that calls to mind the European fairy tale The Beauty and the Beast on the one hand, yet fits Miruka's description of a tale involving African ogre characters, is Brolloks en Bittergal by C.J. Langenhoven. It was first published in 1925, and has kept Afrikaans-speaking listeners spellbound from one generation to the next ever since.

The main character, Brolloks, is a grotesque and monsterlike individual, scheming and decidedly untrustworthy. He is like Miruka's description of Luo ogres: neither human nor animal but displaying characteristics of both; and the Maasai ogre: 'a man-eater as well as an eater of its own kind ... [possessing the] quality of grandiosity and hedonism'. Brolloks lives as a human being would. Miruka emphasises that ogres are but masks of humanity; they are no different from those in society 'who specialise in ugly deeds but who can appear very mild and sociable to gain access to the victims'. Brolloks ultimately corresponds to Miruka's interpretation of the ogre who stands "for evil and death. He symbolises the ominous flail of vice looming over humanity and threatening to reduce it to nothingness. He is a replica of those of us who are dehumanised, alienated, immoral and egotistically ready to achieve their goals ... regardless of the repercussions on the larger society".

=== Monsters ===
- Grootslang - A giant snake.
- Pinky Pinky - A spirit that lives in school bathrooms and targets girls who wear pink underwear.

== See also ==
- South African folklore
