= Helena Nogueira =

- Born: Mozambique
- Citizenship: South African
- Education: University of Natal; Institut des hautes études cinématographiques
- Occupation: Film director

Helena Nogueira is a South African film director, "the first woman to direct a feature film in South Africa".

== Life ==
Helena Nogueira was born in Mozambique. She studied at the University of Natal and then the Institut des hautes études cinématographiques in Paris.

Nogueira's first film was a documentary about Athol Fugard, and she has subsequently directed a documentary on Ingrid Jonker. Her 1988 feature film Quest for Truth, Quest for Love was based on Gertrude Stein's first novel, Q.E.D.. It featured lesbian attraction between an activist and an ecologist, played by Jana Cilliers and Sandra Prinsloo, against the backdrop of apartheid South Africa.

== Films ==
Documentaries

- Fugard's People, 1982
- Ingrid Jonker: Her Lives and Time..., 2002

Feature films

- Quest for Truth, Quest for Love / Quest for Love / Fire in their Hearts, 1988
- The Good Fascist, 1992
