= Quest for Love (1988 film) =

South African film

Quest for love
- Directed by: Helena Nogueira
- Starring: Janna Cilliers; Sandra Prinsloo; Wayne Bowman
- Release date: 1988
- Running time: 94 min
- Country: South Africa
- Language: English

Quest for Love is a South African film released in 1988 directed by Helena Nogueira and stars Jana Cilliers, Sandra Prinsloo and Wayne Bowman. The film is based on Gertrude Stein's short story Q.E.D.

== Plot ==
A journalist finds it difficult to commit herself to both a relationship and a revolution. A lesbian love story, it is set against political turmoil in Southern Africa.

== Cast ==
- Jana Cilliers as Alexandra
- Sandra Prinsloo as Dorothy
- Andrew Buckland as Michael
- Joanna Weinberg as Mabel
- Wayne Bowman as Zaccharia
- Lynn Gaines as Isabella
- Prince Mokhini as Cokwana
- Frances Ndlazilwana as Mapule
- Brian O'Shaughnessy as Brian
- Tootsie Lombard as Policewoman
