= Marie Linde =

South African novelist (1894–1963)

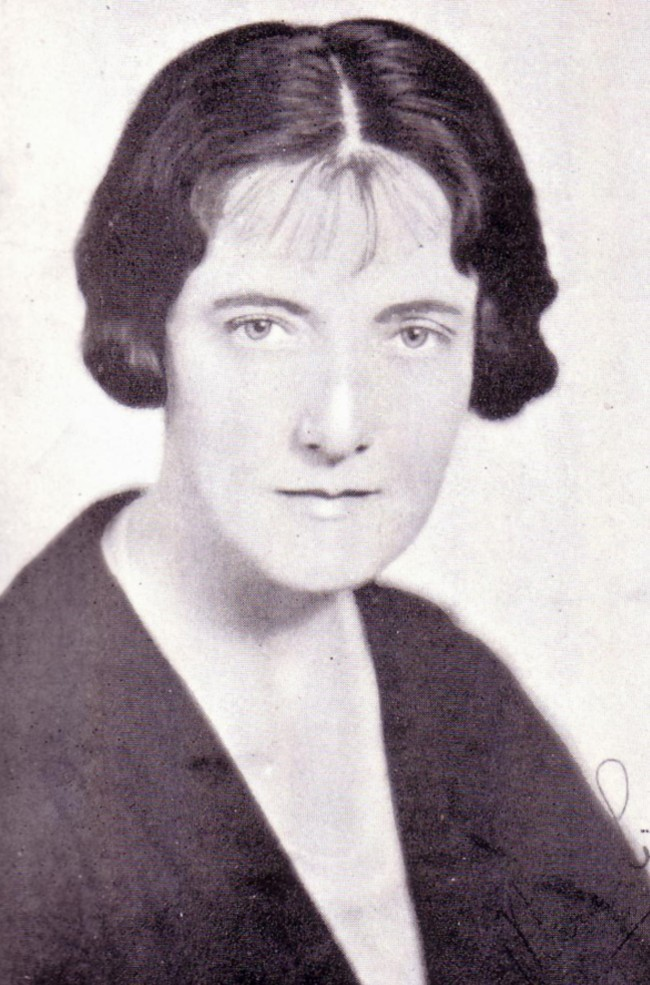
- Marie Linde
- Born: Elizabeth Johanna Bosman; 1 May 1894; Cape Town, Cape Colony
- Died: 28 September 1963 (aged 69); Cape Town, South Africa
- Writing career
- Language: Afrikaans

Marie Linde was the pen name of Elizabeth Johanna Bosman (1 May 1894 – 28 September 1963), a South African novelist of Afrikaner descent. Initially home schooled, she studied modern languages at the University of Cape Town and was an accomplished linguist, able to speak Dutch, German, French and English. She published novels, short stories and plays, and created the first Afrikaans radio play broadcast. Published in 1925, her novel Onder bevoorregte mense was the first Afrikaans novel translated into English, being issued as Among Privileged People.

== Biography ==
Born on 1 May 1894 in Cape Town, Cape Colony to a surveyor from Stellenbosch and minister's daughter from Tulbagh, Elizabeth Johanna Bosman grew up in a home surrounded by books in English and Dutch. Due to poor health, she was initially home-schooled, absorbing the literary diversity of her home, and developing a keen eye for languages. The latter came to the fore in 1905 when, on a visit to Europe, she learned both French and German. She eventually attended Good Hope Seminary High School, leaving in 1913 to read modern languages at the University of Cape Town.

Initially a teacher of Dutch and Afrikans in Cape Town, she turned to writing full-time and published her first novel, Onder bevoorregte mense in 1925. This was also the first novel in Afrikaans to be translated in English, being issued as Among Privileged People, and was followed by a sequel, Bettie Maritz, five years later. She also wrote short stories, which were initially featured in magazines like Huisgenoot, later being compiled into collections for publication. As well as books, she wrote plays, including Die ongelyke worsteling and Beatriks Ursula. She also created one of the first radio plays in Afrikaans, entitled Drie lewens or Three Lives, which was first broadcast in 1935. She died on 28 September 1963 at home in Cape Town.

== Selected writings ==
Onder bevoorregte mense (Among Privileged People), 1925
Dina en Lalie (Dina and Lalie), 1927
Die ongelyke worsteling (The unequal struggle), 1929
Bettie Maritz, 1930
Beatriks Ursula, 1932
Drie toneelstukkies (Three plays), 1932
Die Roi Rotte en ander Verhale (The Red Rats and Other Stories), 1932
Kaparrings en ander Verhale (Hijackings and other stories), 1935
Knap kêrels en mooi nooiens (Handsome boyfriends and pretty girls), 1936
Afrikaanse liederekrans (African song wreath), 1937
’n Huis verdeeld (A house divided), 1943
Op die ou trant (In the old fashioned way), 1944
Die huis met die horings (The house with the horns), 1944
Hoë polvye (High polvye), 1947
Om die beurt (In turn), 1952
