= Jack Cope =

South African novelist, poet and editor (1913–1991)

Robert Knox "Jack" Cope (3 June 1913 – 1 May 1991) was a South African novelist, short story writer, poet and editor.

== Life ==
Jack Cope was born in Natal, South Africa, and home-schooled by tutors. From the age of 12, he boarded at Durban High School in Durban, afterwards becoming a journalist on Natal Mercury and then a political correspondent in London, England, for South African newspapers. At the outbreak of the Second World War, in a state of some disillusionment, he returned to South Africa. He moved to Cape Town, where he worked for the Marxist Guardian newspaper from 1941 to 1955, in various capacities including cultural critic and, at one stage, general editor.

For many years, Cope was sympathetic to Communism and the Soviet Union. His Communist sympathies ended, however, with disillusionment after the revelation of Joseph Stalin's crimes in Nikita Khrushchev's Secret Speech.

He married his second cousin, the artist Lesley De Villiers in 1942. They separated in 1958 and were divorced in the early 1960s. They had two sons, Raymond (1948–1977) and Michael (born 1952).

Jack Cope is well known for his romantic attachment (ca. 1960–1964) to Afrikaans-language poet Ingrid Jonker, who is known as South Africa's answer to Sylvia Plath. After Jonker committed suicide in 1965, Cope edited a posthumous anthology of her last poems and translated a selection of them into English.

== Fiction ==
Cope published eight novels, more than a hundred short stories, and three collections of poetry, the last one in association with C. J. Driver. For twenty years, beginning in 1960, he edited Contrast, a literary magazine bilingual in English and Afrikaans. He co-edited The Penguin Book of South African Verse (1968) with Uys Krige and, as general editor throughout much of the 1970s, produced the Mantis editions of Southern African poets. In 1980, he moved to England, where he published The Adversary Within: Dissident Writers in Afrikaans (1982) and his Selected Stories (1986).

Cope's first novel, The Fair House (1955), considers the Bambata Rebellion of 1906 in an attempt to account for the later racial and political conditions in South Africa. Later novels, including The Golden Oriole (1958), Albino (1964), and The Rain-Maker (1971), chronicle the white man's destruction of black culture and the ensuing struggle by the blacks to regain their pride and identity.

However, it is as a short-story writer that Cope demonstrated his finest talent. His stories evoke, according to Alan Paton, "with a few words the scents and sounds and colours of our country". In "A Crack in the Sky" (The Tame Ox, 1960) and "Power" (The Man Who Doubted and Other Stories, 1967) his moral vision is clear; his third collection, Alley Cat and Other Stories (1973), contains darker themes such as those of alienation and loneliness. Among Cope's main achievements was his influence on South African literature during the 1960s and 1970s, important years in the struggle against apartheid.

== In popular culture ==
The 2011 film Black Butterflies tells the story of the relationship between Ingrid Jonker and Jack Cope, who is portrayed onscreen by Irish actor Liam Cunningham.

== Selected bibliography ==
- Marie: A South African Satire (1948)
- The Golden Oriole (1958)
- The Road To Ysterberg: A Novel (1959)
- The Penguin Book Of South African Verse (Co- editor) (1968)
- The Dawn Comes Twice (1969)
- The Rain-Maker (1971)
- The Africa We Knew (1973)
- Lacking A Label (1974)
- My Son Max (1977)
- Notes Recorded in Sun (1979)
- The Adversary Within: Dissident Writers In Afrikaans (1982)
