= Afrikaans language movement =

The Afrikaans language movement is one of three efforts that have been organised to promote Afrikaans in South Africa.

== First language movement ==
The Afrikaans language movement began in 1875, with the effort by Stephanus Jacobus du Toit to have Afrikaans recognised as a separate language from Dutch. The first Afrikaans newspaper, Die Afrikaanse Patriot, was first published in 1876.

== Second language movement ==
The second language movement arose after the defeat of the Boers in the Second Anglo-Boer War in 1902. Spreading from the Cape Province, it led to the ascendancy of Afrikaans over Dutch and replaced the latter as the medium of instruction in schools, the language of the Dutch Reformed churches and ultimately the co-official language of South Africa in 1925.

== Third language movement ==
After apartheid ended in 1994, the status of Afrikaans in South Africa was much reduced, and went from equal only to English to just one of 11 official languages, which led to a de facto increased dominance of English in the public sphere. Attempts to reverse this relative marginalisation of Afrikaans have been described as the third language movement.

== See also ==
- Language movement (disambiguation)
