= Valkenberg Hospital =

- Western Cape Department of Health
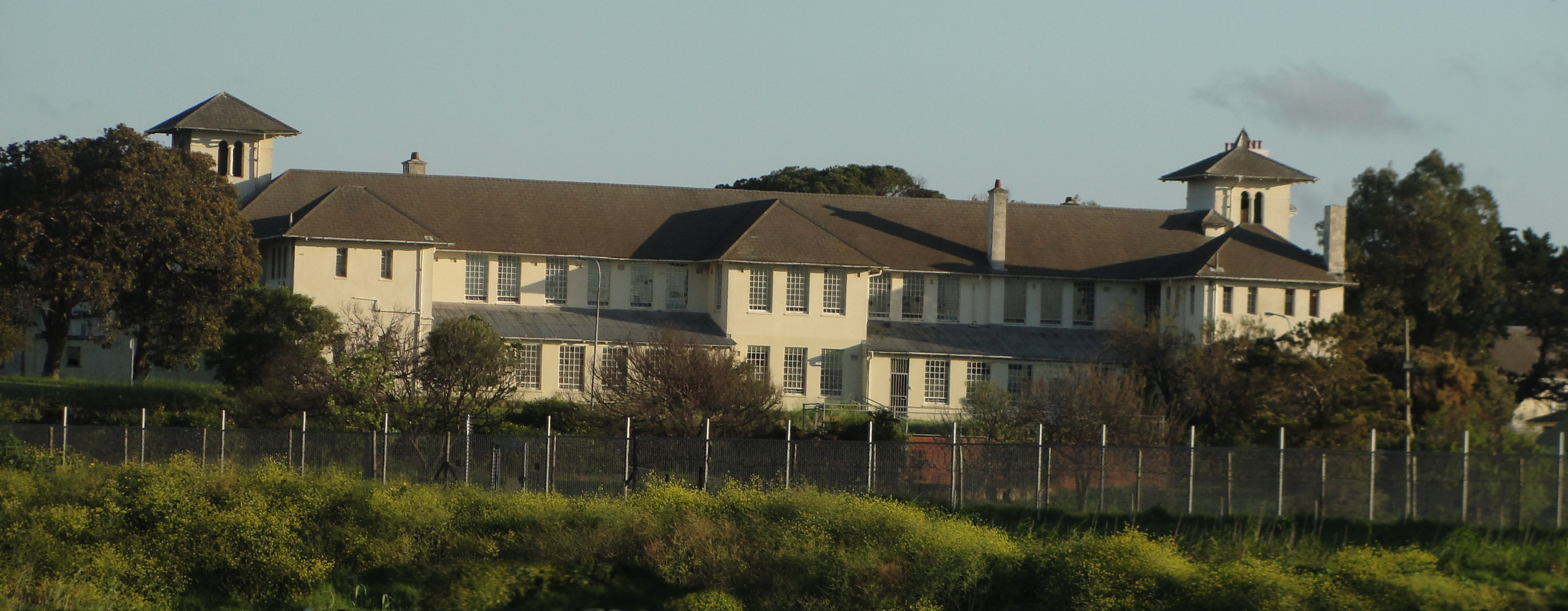

- Shown in Cape Town

Geography
- Location: Observatory, Cape Town, Western Cape, South Africa
- Coordinates: 33.9394°S 18.4816°E

Organisation
- Care system: Department of Health
- Type: Specialist
- Affiliated university: University of Cape Town

Services
- Emergency department: Psychiatric Emergency Unit
- Beds: 370 (170 acute)
- Speciality: Psychiatry

History
- Founded: 1890

Links
- Website: www.westerncape.gov.za/eng/your_gov/305/facilities/6441/20323
- Lists: Hospitals in South Africa

The Valkenberg Hospital is a large, government-funded, tertiary psychiatric hospital in the city of Cape Town, South Africa.

It is situated in the suburb of Observatory between the banks of the Liesbeek and Black Rivers, overlooking Devil's Peak in the distance. Together with its associated psychiatric hospitals (Lentegeur, Stikland and Alexandra Hospitals) it is the chief provider of specialist psychiatric services to the Cape Peninsula as well as being a major specialist referral centre of the Western Cape province.

It is the main teaching hospital for the University of Cape Town's Department of Psychiatry and is also a specialised training centre for psychiatric nursing (Stellenbosch and Western Cape Nursing Colleges).

== History ==
The present institution dates from 1891. (The name Valkenberg derives from the Dutch farmer Cornelius Valk, who established a farm on the land on which the hospital is now situated, in 1720.) In 1881, the Colonial Government of the Cape Colony purchased the Valkenberg estate with a view to building a reformatory. This never took place but a "lunatic asylum", as it was then called, was established instead to accommodate patients transferred from Robben Island. The island had initially accepted patients to relieve pressure from city hospitals such as the Somerset, but reports of unhealthy conditions, overcrowding, and high suicide rates resulted in the decision to transfer care of patients to the Valkenberg site. On 20 February 1891, the first 36 patients were transferred from Robben Island to the Valkenberg Asylum. This originally consisted of two racially segregated hospitals straddling the Liesbeeck and Black rivers. In the first half of the 20th century, the hospital became formally associated with the Medical School of the University of Cape Town.

A famous patient was the poet Ingrid Jonker who was admitted with depression in the 1960s; she later recounted her experiences in several poems. Valkenberg Hospital features prominently in the troubled life of Tshepo, the lead character in K. Sello Duiker's novel, The Quiet Violence of Dreams.

In 1998, the hospital was threatened with closure with the intention of rationalizing services. However, this was met with vigorous opposition and after a lengthy discussion and consultation process; the decision was made to keep the hospital open but to consolidate the site and to reduce the number of beds.

In 2006, a new Admission Unit was completed with integrated High Care units for acutely ill patients. The need to develop a new high care unit derived from the unsuitable design of the previous wards, which had been in use from the early part of the 20th century. The old wards represented an outmoded and essentially custodial psychiatric practice that has no place in a modern, more humane service, adhering to the most recent developments in effective psychiatric care.

== Services ==
Apart from offering general in- and outpatient psychiatric services, Valkenberg has a variety of specialised units such as the Forensic Unit and Acute Admission Units. The hospital currently comprises 370 beds of which about 165 are dedicated to the acute psychiatric service and 145 to the forensic psychiatric services and the remainder still houses a small component of long term patients. With the exception of the Maximum Security Unit (Ward 20), all wards are located on the Observatory site of the Estate. It is envisaged that with the Hospital Revitalisation process about to start all wards will in future be placed on the Observatory site.

Patients who are admitted to the Valkenberg service generally suffer from severe psychiatric disorders, and those who are admitted to the high care unit are likely to have a history of the more severe forms of psychotic illnesses associated with behavioural disturbances.

Patients at Valkenberg are either admitted on a voluntary, assisted or involuntary basis in accordance with the South African Mental Health Care Act of 2002. As such, a few wards are isolated and these contain patients who are acutely disturbed and those who have been admitted for observation by the Magistrate's Court (e.g. Forensic psychiatry patients)
