= Swellendam (House of Assembly of South Africa constituency) =

South African constituency, 1910–1994

- Former constituency for the South African House of Assembly
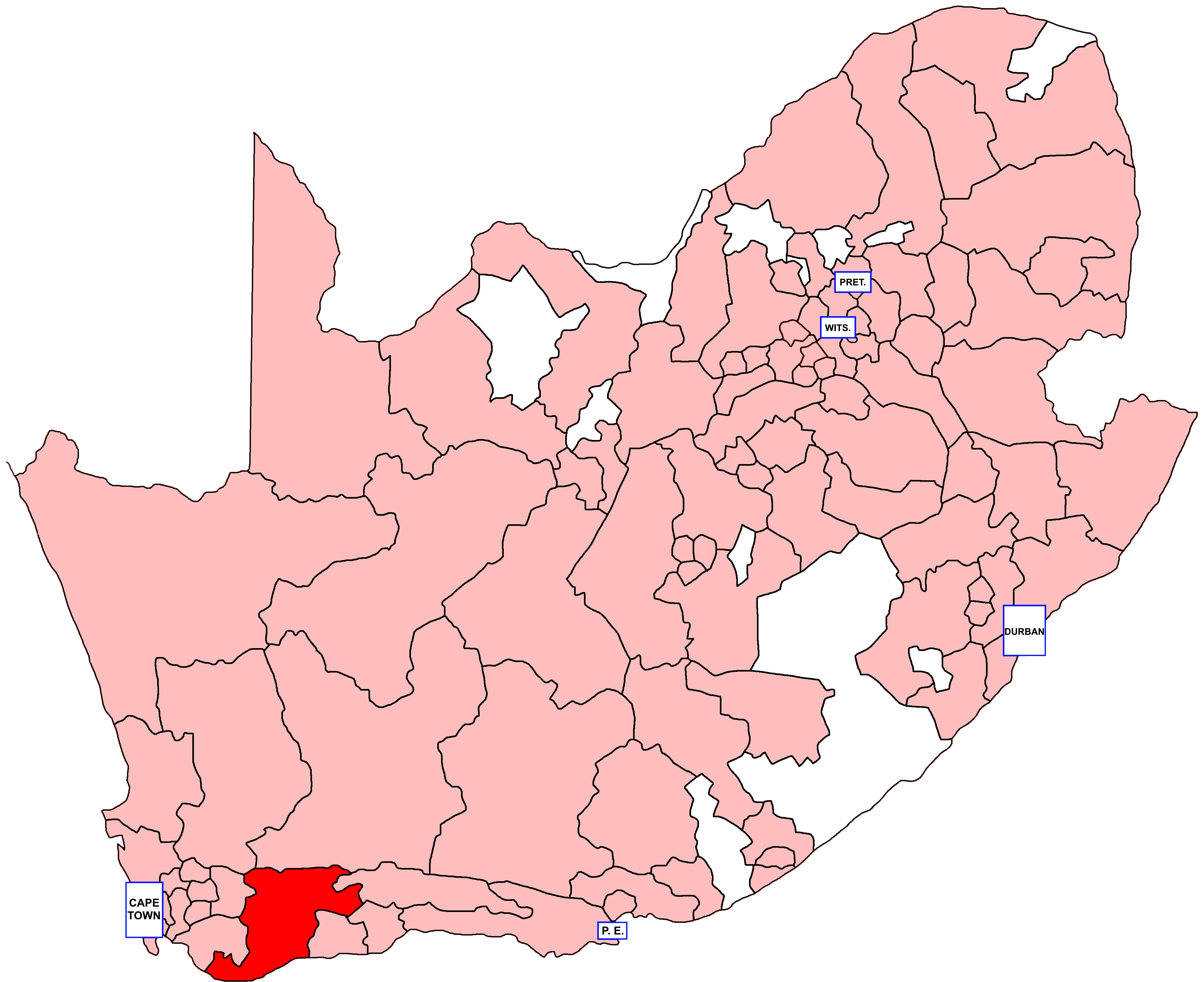
- Location of Swellendam within South Africa (1981)
- Province: Cape of Good Hope
- Electorate: 13,830 (1989)

Former constituency
- Created: 1910
- Abolished: 1994
- Number of members: 1
- Last MHA: Nic Koornhof (NP)
- Replaced by: Western Cape

Swellendam was a constituency in the Cape Province of South Africa, which existed from 1910 to 1994. The constituency covered a part of the Overberg region centred on the town of Swellendam. Throughout its existence it elected one member to the House of Assembly and one to the Cape Provincial Council.

== Franchise notes ==
When the Union of South Africa was formed in 1910, the electoral qualifications in use in each pre-existing colony were kept in place. The Cape Colony had implemented a “colour-blind” franchise known as the Cape Qualified Franchise, which included all adult literate men owning more than £75 worth of property (controversially raised from £25 in 1892), and this initially remained in effect after the colony became the Cape Province. As of 1908, 22,784 out of 152,221 electors in the Cape Colony were “Native or Coloured”. Eligibility to serve in Parliament and the Provincial Council, however, was restricted to whites from 1910 onward.

The first challenge to the Cape Qualified Franchise came with the Women's Enfranchisement Act, 1930 and the Franchise Laws Amendment Act, 1931, which extended the vote to women and removed property qualifications for the white population only – non-white voters remained subject to the earlier restrictions. In 1936, the Representation of Natives Act removed all black voters from the common electoral roll and introduced three “Native Representative Members”, white MPs elected by the black voters of the province and meant to represent their interests in particular. A similar provision was made for Coloured voters with the Separate Representation of Voters Act, 1951, and although this law was challenged by the courts, it went into effect in time for the 1958 general election, which was thus held with all-white voter rolls for the first time in South African history. The all-white franchise would continue until the end of apartheid and the introduction of universal suffrage in 1994.

== History ==
Swellendam, like the rest of the Western Cape, started out as a safe seat for the South African Party and over time gradually became a safe seat for the National Party. Its first Nationalist MP, future Chief Justice Henry Allan Fagan, followed his mentor J. B. M. Hertzog into the United Party in 1934, then moved to nearby Stellenbosch to seek election there in 1938. In that year, Swellendam was picked up by S. E. Warren for the Purified National Party, and the NP would hold it until the end of apartheid. Its last MP, Nic Koornhof, would stay in politics until 2019, changing parties several times and eventually ending up representing the ANC in the National Assembly.

== Members ==
Election	Member	Party
1910	J. W. van Eeden	South African
1915	J. W. van Eeden	South African
1920	J. W. van Eeden	South African
1921	J. W. van Eeden	South African
1924	Eli Buirski	South African
1929	G. van Zyl Wolfaard	National
1933	Henry Allan Fagan	National
1934	Henry Allan Fagan	United
1938	S. E. Warren	GNP
1943	S. E. Warren	HNP
1948	S. E. Warren	HNP
1953	I. W. J. van der Vyver	National
1958	I. W. J. van der Vyver	National
1961	F. J. van Eeden	National
1966	J. J. Malan	National
1970	J. J. Malan	National
1974	J. J. Malan	National
1977	J. J. Malan	National
1978 by	A. Geldenhuys	National
1981	A. Geldenhuys	National
1987	Nic Koornhof	National
1989	Nic Koornhof	National
1994	constituency abolished	

== Detailed results ==
=== Elections in the 1910s ===
General election 1910: Swellendam
Party	Candidate	Votes	%	±%
South African	J. W. van Eeden	Unopposed		
South African win (new seat)				

General election 1915: Swellendam
Party	Candidate	Votes	%	±%
South African	J. W. van Eeden	1,895	68.7	N/A
National	N. J. Ackermann	864	31.3	New
Majority		1,031	37.4	N/A
Turnout		2,759	85.3	N/A
South African hold		Swing	N/A	

=== Elections in the 1920s ===
General election 1920: Swellendam
Party	Candidate	Votes	%	±%
South African	J. W. van Eeden	1,563	60.2	−8.5
National	J. H. Coetzee	1,011	38.9	+7.6
Independent	W. C. Hugo	22	0.8	New
Majority		552	21.3	−16.1
Turnout		2,596	74.9	−10.4
South African hold		Swing	-8.1	

General election 1921: Swellendam
Party	Candidate	Votes	%	±%
South African	J. W. van Eeden	1,583	58.1	−2.1
National	J. H. Coetzee	1,141	41.9	+3.0
Majority		442	16.2	−5.1
Turnout		2,724	76.8	+1.9
South African hold		Swing	-2.6	

General election 1924: Swellendam
Party	Candidate	Votes	%	±%
South African	Eli Buirski	1,781	55.3	−2.8
National	J. H. Coetzee	1,416	44.0	+2.1
Rejected ballots		24	0.7	N/A
Majority		365	11.3	−4.9
Turnout		3,221	88.5	+11.7
South African hold		Swing	-2.5	

General election 1929: Swellendam
Party	Candidate	Votes	%	±%
National	G. van Z. Wolfaard	1,806	55.7	+11.7
South African	G. J. Rossouw	1,406	43.4	−11.9
Rejected ballots		30	0.9	+0.2
Majority		400	12.3	N/A
Turnout		3,242	91.6	+3.1
National gain from South African		Swing	+11.8	

=== Elections in the 1930s ===
General election 1933: Swellendam
Party	Candidate	Votes	%	±%
National	Henry Allan Fagan	3,820	61.2	+5.5
Independent	G. J. Kloppers	2,353	37.7	New
Rejected ballots		70	1.1	+0.2
Majority		1,467	23.5	N/A
Turnout		6,243	83.0	−8.6
National hold		Swing	N/A	

General election 1938: Swellendam
Party	Candidate	Votes	%	±%
Purified National	S. E. Warren	3,681	52.8	New
United	J. H. Coetzee	3,231	46.3	−14.9
Rejected ballots		65	0.9	-0.2
Majority		450	6.4	N/A
Turnout		6,977	91.3	+8.3
Purified National gain from United		Swing	N/A	
