= Henry Allan Fagan =

South African Chief Justice, writer and politician

The Honourable Henry Allan Fagan QC
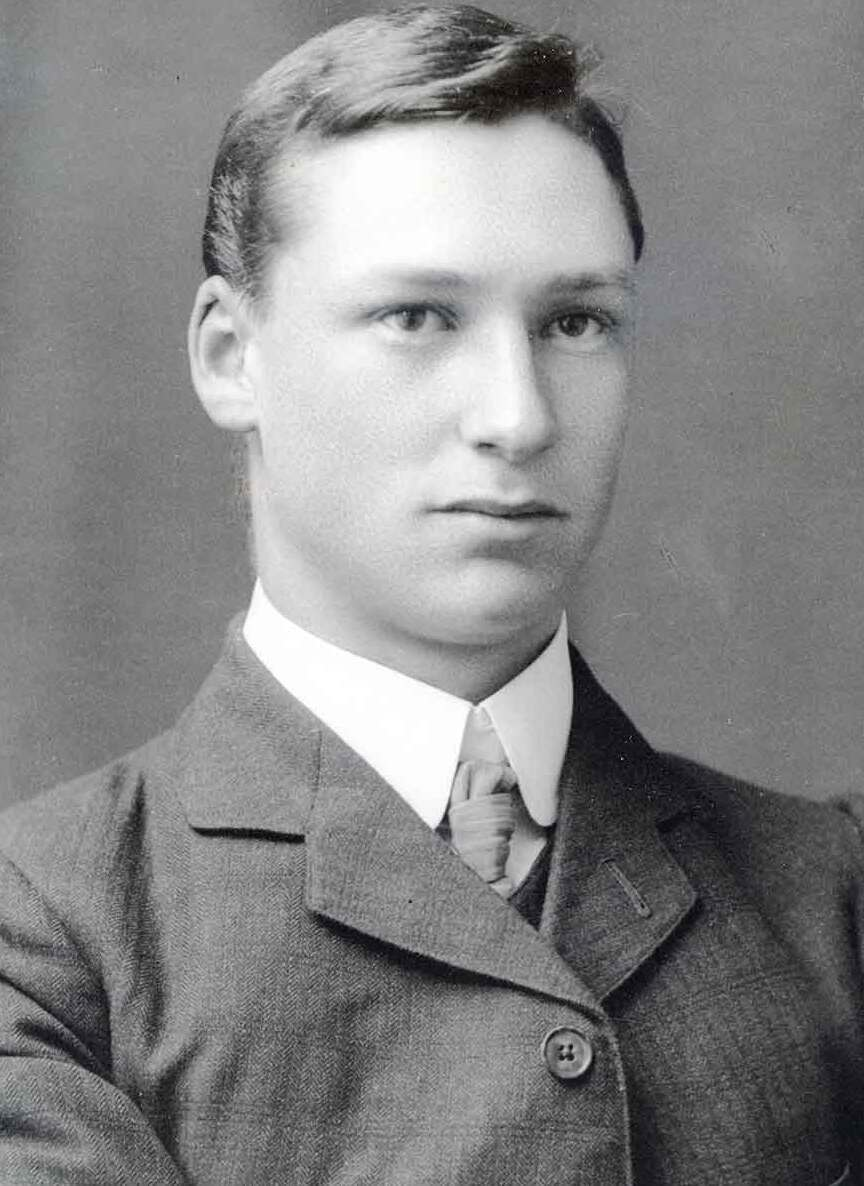

11th Chief Justice of South Africa
- In office 1957–1959
- Appointed by: J. G. Strydom
- Preceded by: Albert van der Sandt Centlivres
- Succeeded by: L. C. Steyn

Judge of the Appellate Division
- In office 1950–1959
- Appointed by: D. F. Malan

Judge of the Cape Provincial Division
- In office 1943–1950
- Appointed by: Jan Smuts

Minister of Native Affairs
- In office June 1938 – September 1939
- Prime Minister: J. B. M. Hertzog
- Preceded by: Piet W. Grobler
- Succeeded by: Deneys Reitz

Member of the South African Parliament
- In office 1933–1943
- Constituency: Swellendam; Stellenbosch

Personal details
- Born: 17 April 1889 Tulbagh, Cape Colony
- Died: 6 December 1963 (aged 74) Cape Town, South Africa
- Children: Hannes Fagan, Gawie Fagan
- Education: Victoria College, Stellenbosch; University of London
- Profession: Barrister

Henry Allan Fagan, QC (4 April 1889 – 6 December 1963) was the Chief Justice of South Africa from 1957 to 1959 and previously a Member of Parliament and the Minister of Native Affairs in J. B. M. Hertzog's government. Fagan had been an early supporter of the Afrikaans language movement and a noted Afrikaans playwright and novelist. Though he was a significant figure in the rise of Afrikaner nationalism and a long-term member of the Broederbond, he later became an important opponent of Hendrik Verwoerd's National Party and is best known for the report of the Fagan Commission, whose relatively liberal approach to racial integration amounted to the Smuts government's last, doomed stand against the policy of apartheid.

== Early life and education ==
Fagan was born in Tulbagh, a historical town in the winelands of the Cape Colony, in 1889. He was the oldest of seven children. His father was a lawyer and amateur poet, and kept a vast collection of books at the family's Cape Dutch residence (now a National Monument) on Kerk Straat, including leading works of theology and English literature. Fagan began his schooling in Tulbagh but completed the bulk of it in Somerset West. In 1905 he went to Victoria College (later to become the University of Stellenbosch), from which he earned a BA in Literature. He hoped (like many of his peers) to be a minister of religion, and went to the seminary in Stellenbosch; but his father's long-standing wish was that he would become a barrister, and continued to pay for private lessons in law.

In the end, Fagan opted for law, and was admitted to the LLB program at the University of London in 1911. There he lived with his maternal uncle, J. J. Smith, who was researching Afrikaans in the library of the Museum of London and would later become the leading figure in the Afrikaans language movement and compiler of the language's first standard dictionary. Smith soon persuaded Fagan of the cultural importance of Afrikaans — Fagan had believed hitherto that a simplified form of Dutch was the best way to develop a written language for the Afrikaner people — and encouraged him to write his first Afrikaans poetry and short stories. Fagan earned his LLB in 1914, and was admitted to the Inner Temple the following year. He then returned to South Africa to practice at the Cape Bar.

== Political career ==
=== Early involvement in the Afrikaner language movement ===
Fagan returned to the Cape at a time of great turbulence and excitement. The Afrikaans language movement was taking shape and J. B. M. Hertzog would soon found his National Party, and Fagan was thrust into this emerging movement for Afrikaner nationalism. He was the secretary of the committee which founded the Nasionale Pers, becoming a director of the Pers and the assistant editor of its flagship newspaper, Die Burger, under D. F. Malan, then beginning his political career as leader of the National Party in the Cape Province. He also lent editorial supervision to the Pers's family magazine Die Huisgenoot, of which his uncle J. J. Smith was the first editor, and translated the works of Theodor Storm into Afrikaans.

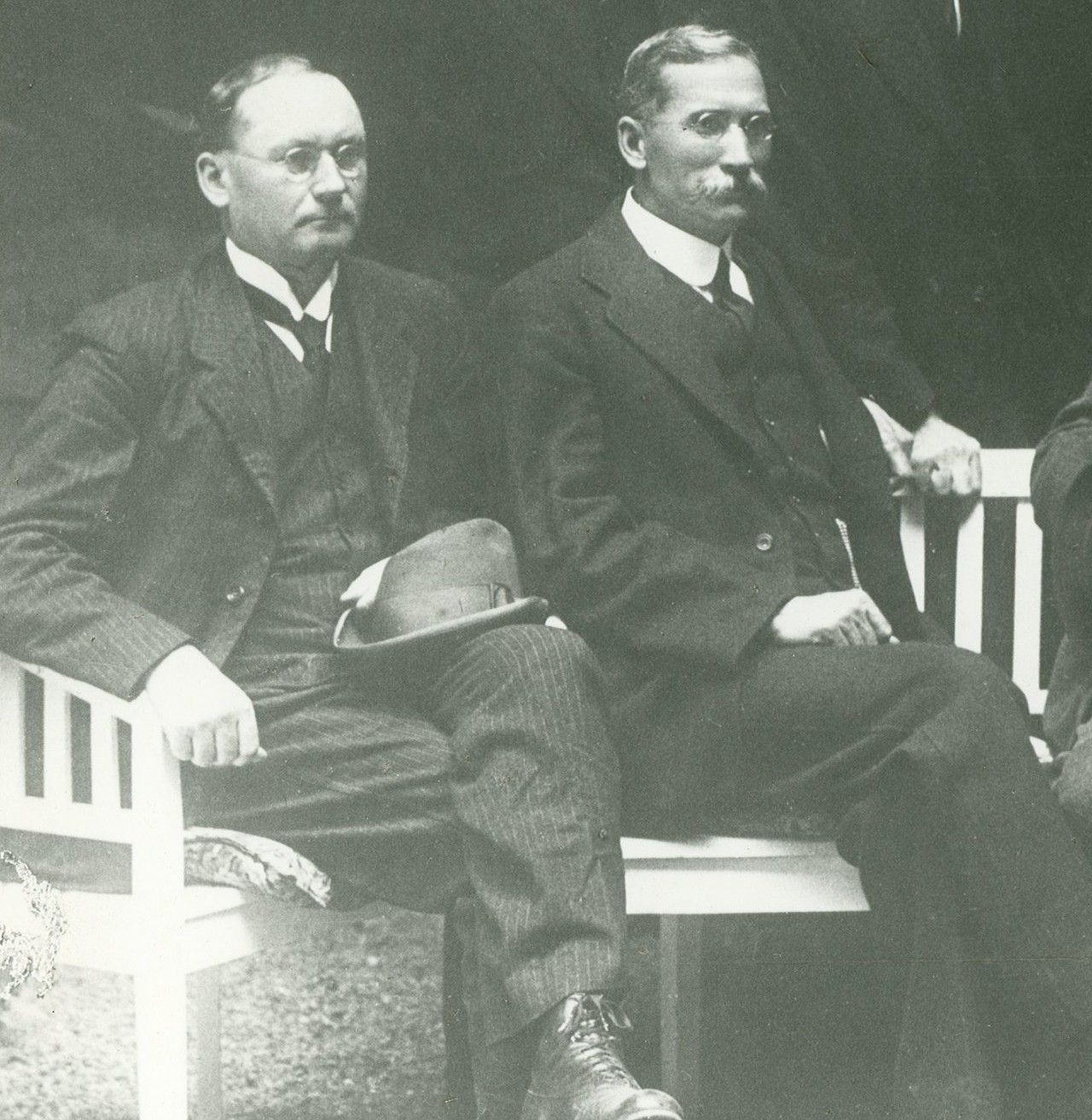
D. F. Malan (left) and J. B. M. Hertzog, 1919. Fagan was a close early colleague of Malan's at Die Burger, but remained loyal to Hertzog when he broke with Malan, and came to be an important opponent of Malan and his successors.

In 1919, Fagan left Die Burger and became, for a brief period, the first Professor of Roman-Dutch law in the newly formed law faculty at the University of Stellenbosch. The following year he returned to legal practice. He continued to be involved in the Afrikaner language movement, and helped ensure, along with his close friend C. J. Langenhoven, that Afrikaans was made an official language (replacing Dutch) in 1925.

=== In Parliament ===
Though Fagan's practice had become very reputable, and he had been appointed a King's Counsel in 1927, he was "bitten by the political bug" after Hertzog's National Party achieved electoral success. He decided to stand for election to the House of Assembly, the lower house of Parliament, in 1929 in the Hottentots-Holland (now Helderberg) district, but lost narrowly. He succeeded four years later, becoming a National Party MP representing Swellendam. When Hertzog fused with Jan Smuts' South African Party in 1934, leading to rancor with Malan's now 'purified' National Party, Fagan decided — after a two-year delay, during which he occupied his parliamentary seat as a so-called independent Nationalist — to break with Malan and his other old friends and follow Hertzog into the United Party, whose relatively conciliatory racial politics he preferred. In 1936, he was instrumental in setting up the Cape Town-based newspaper Die Suiderstem, an Afrikaans-language mouthpiece for Hertzog (who had lost Die Burger's support after splitting with Malan).

In 1938, Fagan was given a chance to withdraw from politics and become a judge, but he refused, preferring to stand as the United Party's candidate for the contested Stellenbosch seat in an attempt to wrest it away from the National Party. Malan himself came out to campaign on behalf of the Nationalist candidate, Bruckner de Villiers, who promised to strip coloured voters of the franchise. Fagan won by a narrow majority. He became Minister of Native Affairs in Hertzog's government (alongside the likes of Jan Kemp and Oswald Pirow) after the 1938 general election and was, in the view of one leading historian, the "most outstanding" of Hertzog's associates. Just a year later, however, Hertzog left the United Party in protest at Smuts' decision, in the face of clamant calls for neutrality from Afrikaans-speakers, to take the country into War in support of Britain, and Fagan "felt bound to go with him into the political wilderness". Fagan resumed legal practice, but remained an MP. Both he and Hertzog rejoined the National Party a few months later, a move Fagan strongly supported. When Hertzog once again split from Malan in 1941 to form the Afrikaner Party, however, Fagan did not follow him, staying instead in the NP caucus.

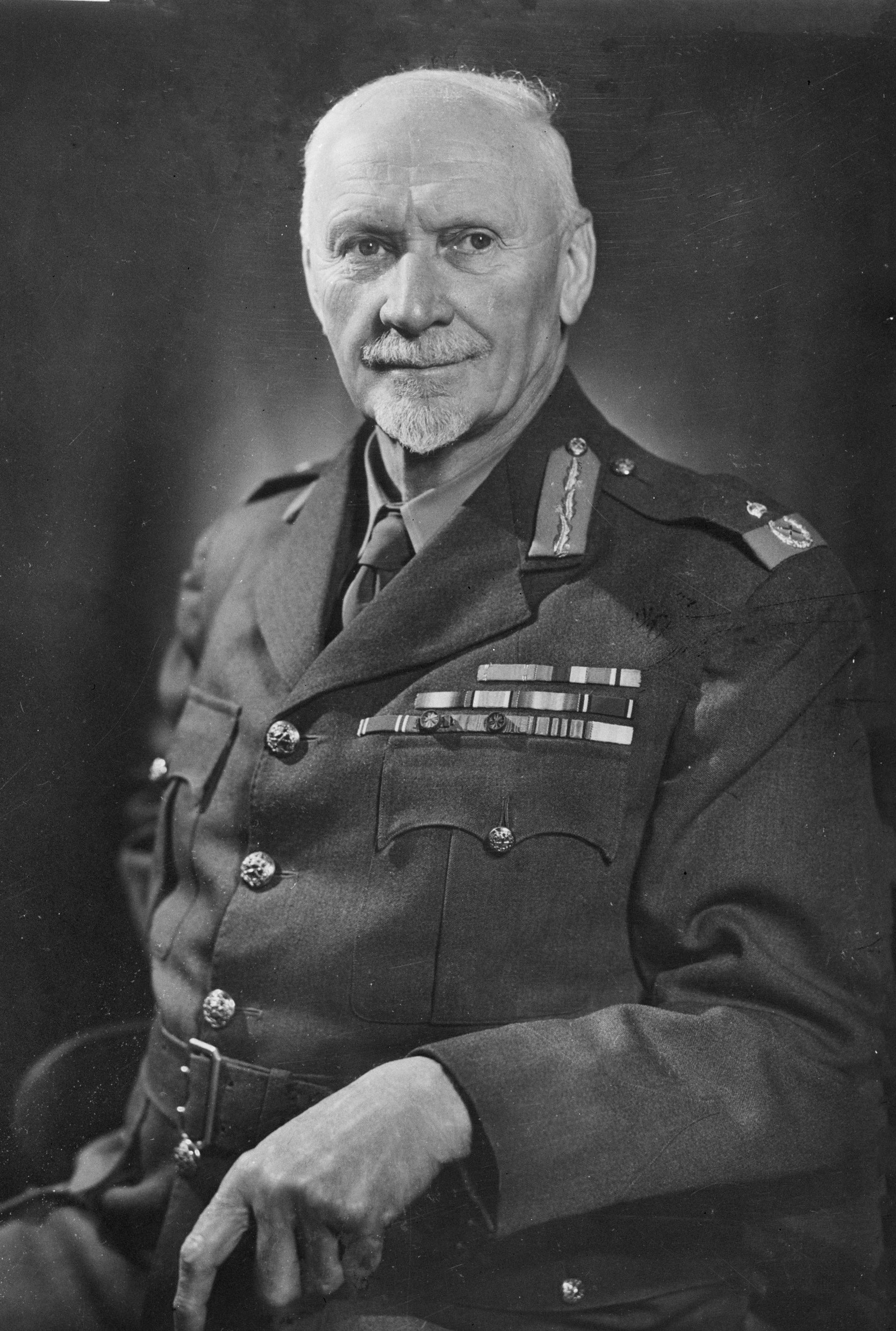
Jan Smuts, whose United Party Fagan joined after some hesitation and left after Smuts led South Africa into World War II. Smuts nevertheless appointed Fagan as a judge in 1943 and head of the pivotal Native Laws Commission in 1946.

Thus, although Fagan had been in the vanguard of the Afrikaner nationalist movement and began and ended his political career as a colleague of Malan's, he "was not a Malanite" and differed in crucial respects, and at crucial historical moments, from the post-Hertzog National Party. The best-known instance would be his report for the Native Laws Commission (commonly called the Fagan Commission), which recommended a gradual liberalisation of South Africa's system of racial segregation and was accordingly "savaged" by his old party. Fagan was described, at least in these early years, as a "moderate", and retained significant ties to the Afrikaner establishment.

== Judicial career ==
Fagan was made a judge of the Cape Provincial Division by Prime Minister Smuts in March 1943. It was Smuts who had, as Minister of Justice under Hertzog, offered Fagan the same post some years earlier. Fagan also had eight months' experience as an acting judge in the Kimberley High Court before entering politics. One contemporary observer wrote that Fagan's appointment to the bench was "richly deserved" and met with "universal approbation" from the legal profession. Despite Fagan's association with the ruling United Party, concerns about political interference in judicial appointments were in Fagan's case relatively attenuated.

Unsurprisingly given his previous professorial appointment, Fagan was a "great exponent of Roman-Dutch law", and his best-known judgments were those which dealt closely with the old authorities like Voet and the Digest. Yet, unlike many other judges with Afrikaner nationalist leanings, Fagan did not shun English law on principle.

=== Fagan Commission ===
In 1946, as pressure was building from Malan's reactionary National Party, Smuts sought to devise a comprehensive United Party position on the so-called native question. For this purpose he appointed the independent Native Laws Commission, with Fagan as its head, to investigate changes to the system of segregation. When the Commission reported in 1948, it stated that the total segregation or apartheid envisaged by the National Party was "utterly impracticable", since South Africa's racial groups were inevitably interdependent, and the 'reserves' set aside for black South Africans were far too small to support them. It therefore recommended that 'influx control' measures be relaxed, allowing black South Africans to move to cities with relative freedom and the incremental integration of the races. Yet the report did not favour racial equality, and rejected the full social or political integration of black people as unacceptable. It recommended liberalisation primarily on the basis that it would benefit the white population economically, and recommended accordingly that only those black persons who would benefit industry should be allowed to stay in the cities.

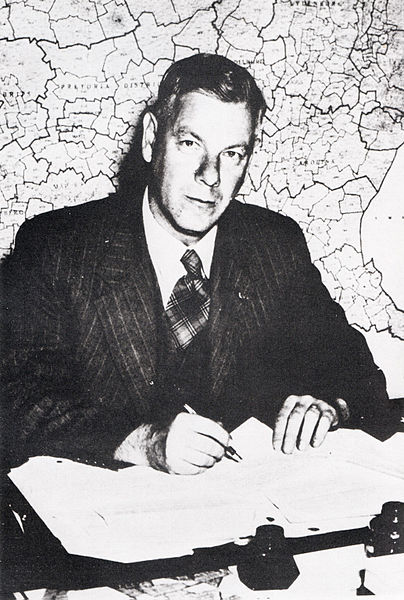
Hendrik Verwoerd, who lashed out at the report of the Fagan Commission, and whose hard-line policies as Prime Minister Fagan later opposed.

Nevertheless, the Commission had firmly rejected the principles on which the National Party's official policy of apartheid was based, and therefore raised its ire. Hendrik Verwoerd, then an MP and the editor of Die Transvaler, was especially critical. And a declaration signed by a prominent group of Stellenbosch academics angrily pointed out that if Fagan's racial integration were allowed this would lead inevitably to gelykstelling (social levelling) and, as a result of pressure to give blacks equal civil rights, the political marginalisation of the white population; the upshot would be the death of the Afrikaner volk. Though they were angry, the Nationalists had not been caught unprepared: in fact, Malan had already set up a rival commission headed by his closest confidante, Paul Sauer, and staffed by three NP parliamentarians, and which had reported in 1947. The Sauer Commission had given added detail and heft to the Nationalists' policy of apartheid, recommending that influx control measures be strengthened to prevent any mixing between the races, with black people consigned to the reserves. It was this hard-line view which triumphed when Malan's National Party won the 1948 general election.

=== Appellate Division ===
Despite the uncongenial report of his Commission, the Malan government was willing to elevate Fagan to the Appellate Division, the country's highest court, in October 1950, to replace the departed Chief Justice Watermeyer. Concern was growing at that stage that the Nationalists were trying to fill the Appellate Division with loyalists, but in Fagan's case these concerns were, again, attenuated; despite his links with the government, he was a moderate whose appointment was justified on merit.

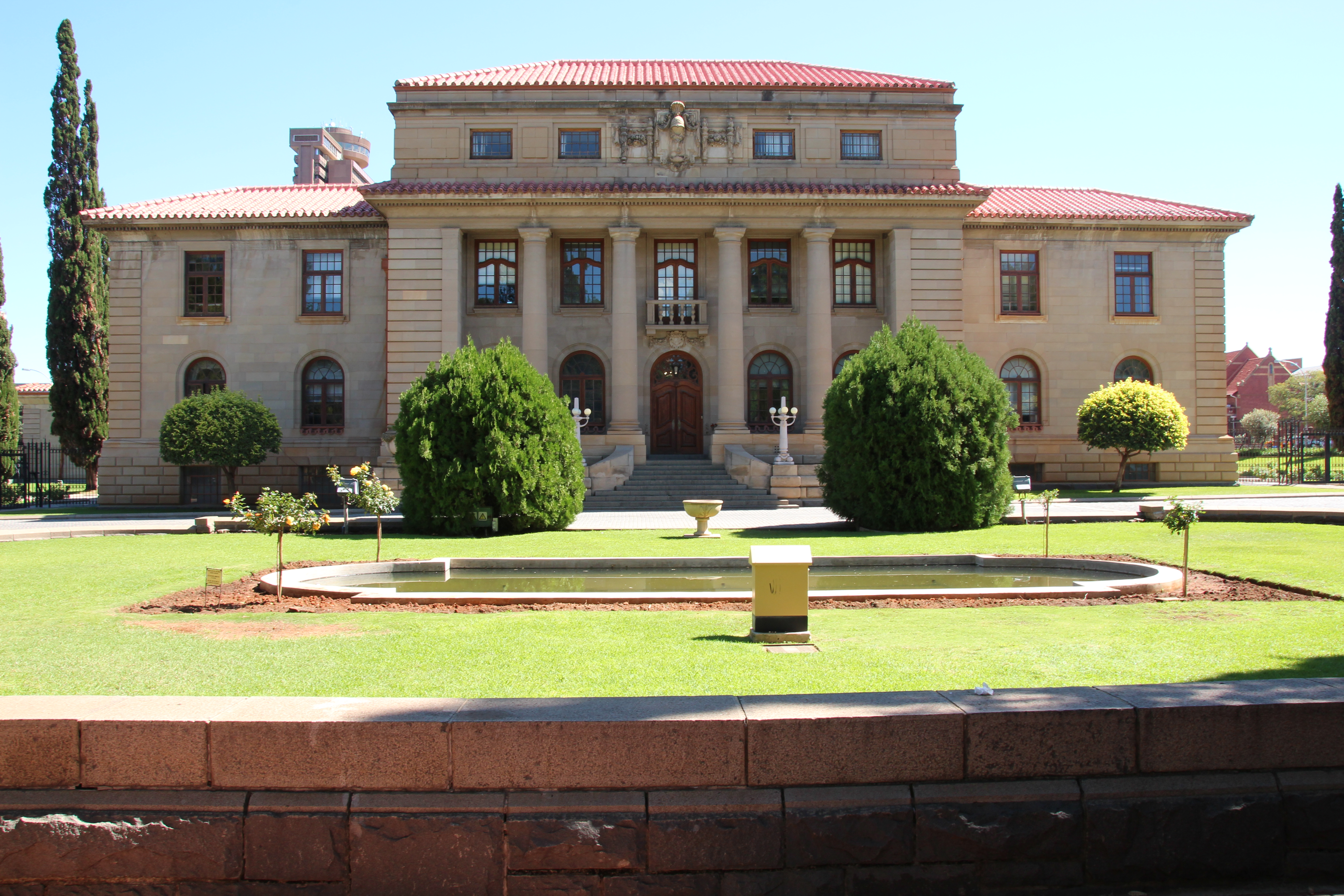
The building of the Appellate Division (now Supreme Court of Appeal of South Africa) in Bloemfontein, where Fagan sat as a judge from 1950 to 1959.

Fagan's most significant judgments were about private law, raising little political intrigue: he established that gambling debts are unenforceable in South African law, and that undue influence vitiates a contract. But he did find against the government in its attempt to enforce the Population Registration Act, 1950, raising the standard of proof required to classify a person as 'non-European' on the provocative basis that Parliament could not have intended something so unjust as foisting that status on a person without adequate proof.

==== Chief Justice ====
Greater political intrigue marked his appointment and tenure as Chief Justice of South Africa.

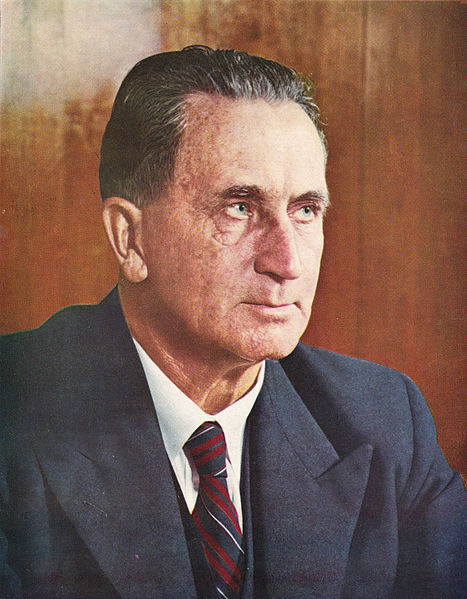
Portrait of Prime Minister JG Strijdom in Die Huisgenoot. Fagan despised Strijdom's authoritarianism, but acceded in Collins v Minister of the Interior to his disenfranchisement of coloured voters and reluctantly accepted appointment by him as Chief Justice.

The Chief Justiceship fell vacant upon the retirement at the end of 1956 of Albert van der Sandt Centlivres. Centlivres had stood firm, in the Harris v Minister of the Interior cases, against the Nationalists' first attempts to strip coloured voters in the Cape Province of their right to vote, which was constitutionally entrenched in the South Africa Act. But virtually his last act as a judge was finally to relent, in Collins v Minister of the Interior, and to give legal sanction to the disenfranchisement, which the National Party, now led by J. G. Strydom after Malan's death, had secured by packing the Senate. Fagan, too, had sat in this last case (but not in Harris), and concurred in Centlivres' judgment. The lone dissentient was Oliver Schreiner, a noted liberal judge of very high esteem. Schreiner was also the most senior judge on the Appellate Division after Centlivres' retirement, and was therefore first in line, according to long-standing convention, for appointment as Chief Justice. Yet he had plainly proven himself to be politically unsafe during this so-called coloured vote crisis, and was, presumably as a result, passed over by the Nationalist government. This move was widely condemned. The next most senior judge, Hoexter, had joined Centlivres' judgment in Collins, but had voted against the government in the Harris cases, so he, too, was disfavoured. That left Fagan, untainted by any association with Harris and with clear Afrikaner and Nationalist ties, who was offered the post by Minister of Justice C. R. Swart. Fagan was shocked by the offer, describing it as a "bolt from the blue". In a letter to Swart, Fagan said he was faced with "a very difficult choice", noting his concerns about superseding the more senior Schreiner and the obvious implication that the offer was politically motivated.

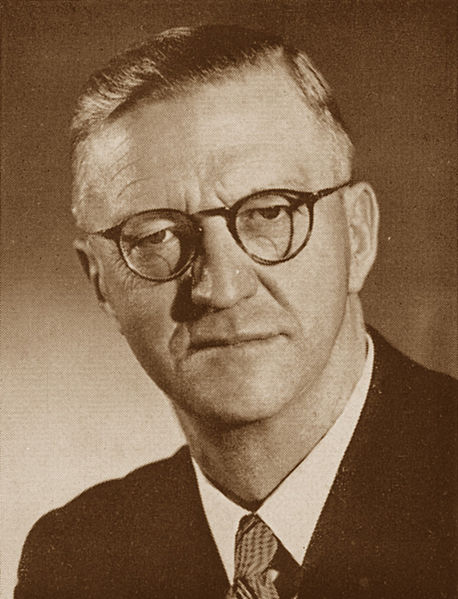
CR Swart, who as Minister of Justice controversially appointed Fagan as Chief Justice, and who later defeated him in a Senate election in 1961 to become South Africa's first State President.

In the end, after discussions with Schreiner, Fagan accepted the post. They decided it was best for him to accept the appointment, despite all its problems, to prevent notorious National Party favourite L. C. Steyn becoming Chief Justice. Initially they had, at Centlivres' suggestion, tried to reach an agreement among the judges of the Court that they would all refuse appointment, so that the government would be forced to appoint Schreiner. But this plan failed, unsurprisingly, when Steyn refused to agree. Fagan therefore accepted the Chief Justiceship with misgivings. He wrote to his wife after his appointment that he still felt "sick about Oliver [Schreiner]" and ashamed when people congratulated him.

== Retirement ==
When Fagan's judicial career ended in 1959, he re-entered politics, and became a strong opponent of the National Party's increasingly conservative policies under Hendrik Verwoerd. His remarks on the government's racial policy, serialized in the largest Afrikaans newspaper, Die Landstem, were hailed for "breaking the facade of Nationalist unity" and finally sparking an effective opposition to apartheid from within the establishment. Though there had been many black opponents of the government, as well as some prominent critics among white English-speakers, Fagan was one of the first Afrikaners to break ranks. His views had added traction among ordinary Afrikaners as a result of his being a celebrated Afrikaner author.

Fagan's monograph, Our Responsibility, published in February 1960, said (echoing the words of the Fagan Commission) that Verwoerd's policies were "hopelessly impractical", and that South Africa's white population had to accept racial integration. The book was given a scathing review by Piet Cillié, then editor of Die Burger and a staunch Nationalist.

Fagan's public pronouncements resulted in calls for him to lead a political movement. He agreed to become the leader of the National Union (NU), a party newly founded by Japie Basson, a firebrand MP who had been recently expelled from the National Party for criticising Verwoerd. The party was intended to provide a home for Nationalist supporters who refused to tolerate Strydom's disregard for constitutional principles (particularly during the coloured vote crisis, as Fagan well knew). Fagan stood for election as South Africa's first State President after whites voted in a referendum in 1960 to establish a republic, but was defeated by former NP minister and the last Governor-General C. R. Swart by 139 votes to 71. However, he became a senator for the NU, and also its leader. The NU contested the 1961 election in alliance with the United Party, now led by Sir De Villiers Graaff.

The NU soon fizzled out, and Fagan spent his final years as a Senator for the United Party, continuing to argue publicly for racial conciliation, now in the Johannesburg Star. His second treatise on racial politics, Co-existence, was published shortly before his death in 1963.

== Legacy ==
One prominent journalist wrote in 1998, in light of the Fagan Commission's liberal report, which might have changed South African history had the Nats not suppressed it, that Fagan was one of the "unsung heroes" of Afrikaner history. According to Die Burger, however, the report, by documenting the extent to which the races had become integrated, had only helped show how imperative it was to forcibly separate them. That assessment was self-serving, but undoubtedly Fagan's views were more conservative than other critics of the government, like Alan Paton's Liberal Party, and did not question the fact that South Africa's white population ought to be preserved and indeed preferred. Throughout his time as an MP, his views were sufficiently close to Malan's that he could move seamlessly in and out of the National Party, with which he keenly reunified in 1940. Even after the antipathy sparked by the Fagan Commission, and his retirement from the judiciary, his recommendations on the racial question were, in essence, to re-institute Hertzog's racial policies. Yet in part it was precisely because he was no more than a "moderate", who retained significant ties to the Afrikaner establishment, and whose criticisms were so "measured", that his criticisms were able to have an impact.

== Family life ==
Fagan married Jessie "Queeny" Theron, also from Tulbagh, in 1922. She was often the lead actress in performances of Fagan's plays. They had three sons, the last of whom, Johannes, became a judge of the Cape Provincial Division in 1977. The family lived in Bishopscourt, Cape Town, where Fagan died of a heart attack on 6 December 1963.
