= Phillip Louw =

South African academic (born 1974)

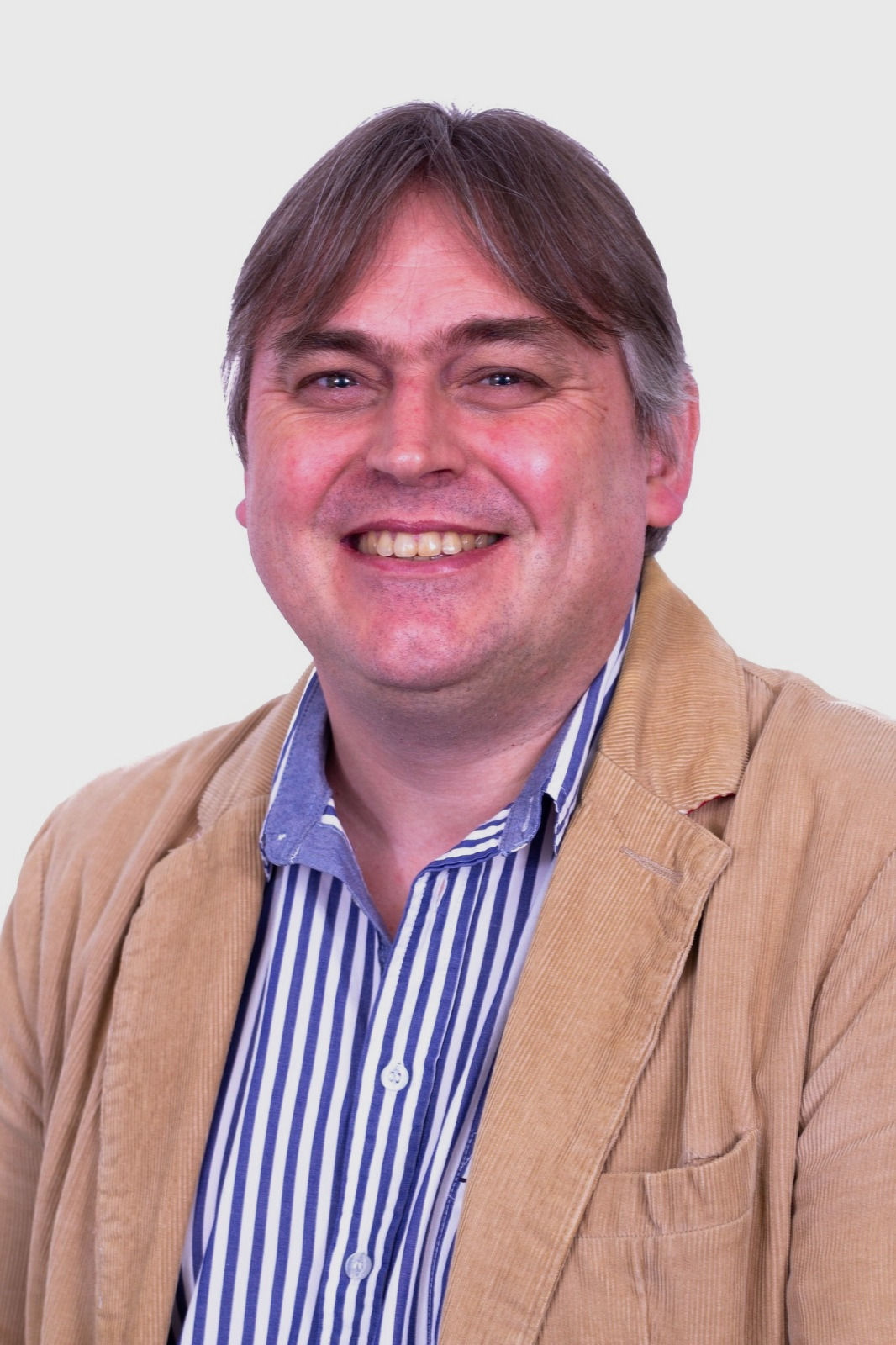
- Louw in 2025
- Born: Phillipus Adriaan Louw; 31 May 1974 (age 52); Uitenhage, Cape of Good Hope, South Africa
- Education: Stellenbosch University
- Occupation: Lexicographer

Phillipus Adriaan Louw (born 31 May 1974) is a South African linguist and executive director of the Woordeboek van die Afrikaanse Taal. He earned a D.Litt in Lexicography (with a focus on school dictionaries) from Stellenbosch University. He began his career as a part-time lecturer in the Department of Afrikaans and Dutch at Stellenbosch University, after which he joined the editorial staff of the Woordeboek van die Afrikaanse Taal (WAT). After seven years as co-editor of the WAT, he joined Oxford University Press Southern Africa in 2005 as senior editor. His first project for OUP, the Oxford Afrikaans–English / English–Afrikaans School Dictionary, received the ATKV Word Award in 2008. He was also the chief editor of the monolingual Oxford Afrikaanse Skoolwoordeboek, published in 2012. Until December 2022, he served as Publishing Manager: Dictionaries and Literature at OUPSA, with an additional support role for the rest of Africa, India, and Australia. In January 2023 he returned to the WAT as editor-in-chief and executive director.

From 2013 to 2019 he was a member of the Afrikaans Language Commission of the South African Academy of Science and Arts (Suid-Afrikaanse Akademie vir Wetenskap en Kuns) and contributed to the 11th edition of the Afrikaanse Woordelys en Spelreëls (Afrikaans Word List and Spelling Rules). Since 2019, he has served as a board member of the African Association for Lexicography (AFRILEX), and since 2024 he has been a research fellow in Stellenbosch University's Department of Afrikaans and Dutch.
