= Dawie =

Dawie is a masculine given name and nickname which may refer to:

- Dawid Dawie Ackermann (1930–1970), South African international rugby union and rugby league footballer
- Dawid Dawie Snyman (born 1949), South African former rugby union player and coach
- Dawie Steyn (born 1984), South African retired rugby union footballer
- David Dawie Theron (born 1966), South African retired rugby union player
- Isak Dawid Dawie van der Walt (born 1983), South African professional golfer
- David Dawie de Villiers (born 1940), South African rugby union player, government minister and Dutch Reformed Church minister
- "Dawie", pen name of Piet Cillié (1917–1999), South African political columnist, journalist and newspaper editor
