= Kuruman (House of Assembly of South Africa constituency) =

South African constituency, 1929–1994

- Former constituency for the South African House of Assembly
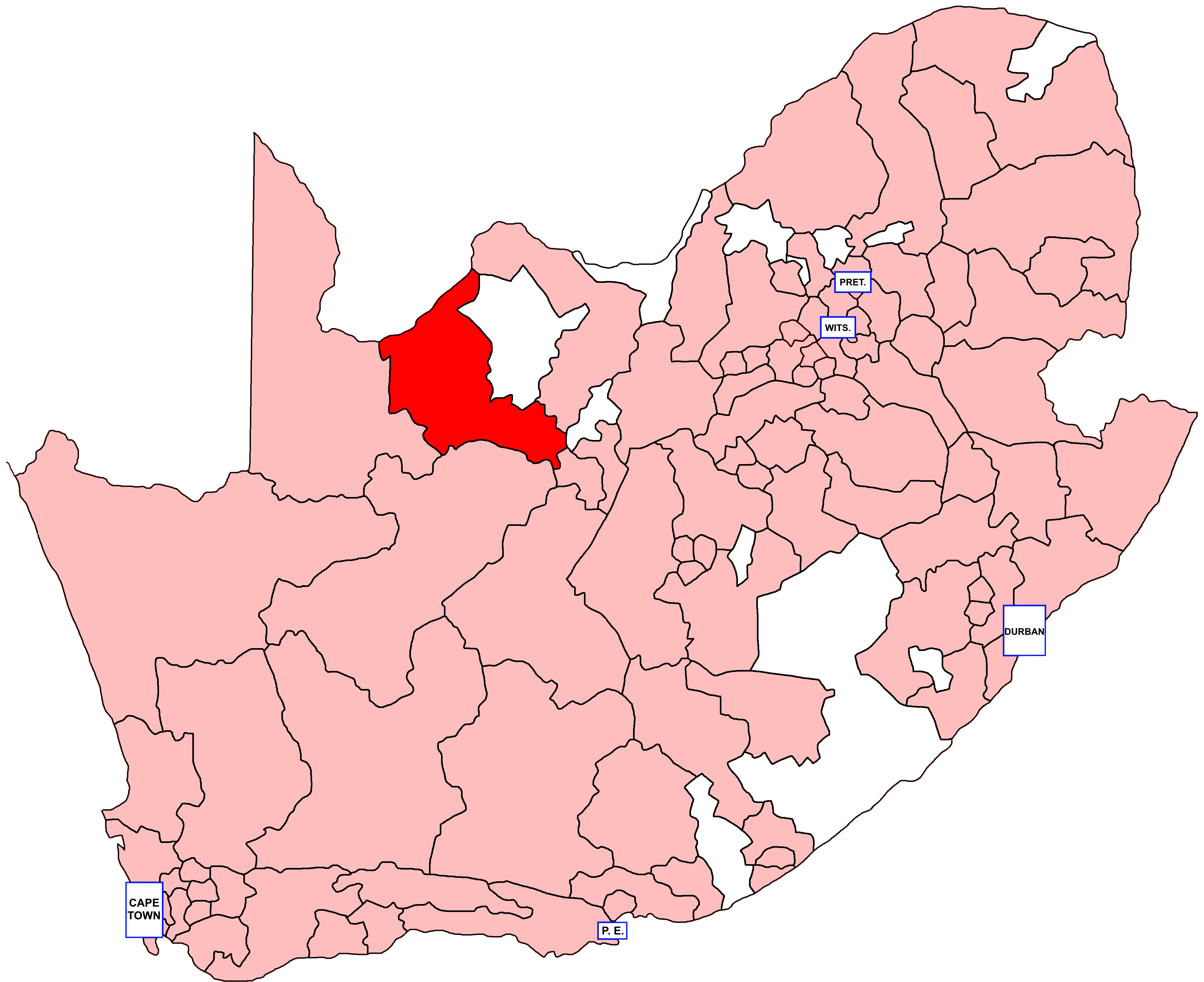
- Location of Kuruman within South Africa (1981)
- Province: Cape of Good Hope
- Electorate: 10,282 (1989)

Former constituency
- Created: 1929
- Abolished: 1994
- Number of members: 1
- Last MHA: J. H. Hoon (CP)
- Created from: Barkly
- Replaced by: Northern Cape

Kuruman was a constituency in the Cape Province of South Africa, which existed from 1929 to 1994. It covered a rural area of the Northern Cape centred on the town of Kuruman. Throughout its existence it elected one member to the House of Assembly and one to the Cape Provincial Council.

== Franchise notes ==
When the Union of South Africa was formed in 1910, the electoral qualifications in use in each pre-existing colony were kept in place. The Cape Colony had implemented a “colour-blind” franchise known as the Cape Qualified Franchise, which included all adult literate men owning more than £75 worth of property (controversially raised from £25 in 1892), and this initially remained in effect after the colony became the Cape Province. As of 1908, 22,784 out of 152,221 electors in the Cape Colony were “Native or Coloured”. Eligibility to serve in Parliament and the Provincial Council, however, was restricted to whites from 1910 onward.

The first challenge to the Cape Qualified Franchise came with the Women's Enfranchisement Act, 1930 and the Franchise Laws Amendment Act, 1931, which extended the vote to women and removed property qualifications for the white population only – non-white voters remained subject to the earlier restrictions. In 1936, the Representation of Natives Act removed all black voters from the common electoral roll and introduced three “Native Representative Members”, white MPs elected by the black voters of the province and meant to represent their interests in particular. A similar provision was made for Coloured voters with the Separate Representation of Voters Act, 1951, and although this law was challenged by the courts, it went into effect in time for the 1958 general election, which was thus held with all-white voter rolls for the first time in South African history. The all-white franchise would continue until the end of apartheid and the introduction of universal suffrage in 1994.

== History ==
Like many constituencies in the rural Cape, the electorate of Kuruman was largely Afrikaans-speaking and conservative, and with the exception of the 1938 general election, the seat was won at every election by the National Party. It largely replaced the seat of Barkly when created in 1929, and Barkly MP Wilhelm Bruckner de Villiers stood for election in both Kuruman and Stellenbosch. He chose to represent Stellenbosch, causing an immediate by-election in Kuruman, which was won by fellow Nationalist Hendrik Jacobus Cornelis de Jager. When the majority of the National Party went into the United Party in 1934, Kuruman MP Ignatius van Wijk Raubenheimer followed J. B. M. Hertzog into the new party, and was re-elected by a safe margin, but died in office in 1939. The resulting by-election was won by Philippus Jacobus Olivier of the Herenigde Nasionale Party, the first election contested by the party under that label. The HNP and the refounded National Party would hold Kuruman for most of the rest of its history. Jan Hendrik Hoon, Kuruman's last MP, defected to Andries Treurnicht's Conservative Party and was defeated for re-election in 1987 by the National Party candidate, but he recaptured the seat at the last whites-only general election in 1989.

== Members ==
Election	Member	Party
1929	Wilhelm Bruckner de Villiers	National
1929 by	Hendrik Jacobus Cornelis de Jager	National
1933	Ignatius van Wijk Raubenheimer	National
1934	Ignatius van Wijk Raubenheimer	United
1938	Ignatius van Wijk Raubenheimer	United
1940 by	Philippus Jacobus Olivier	HNP
1943	Philippus Jacobus Olivier	HNP
1948	Philippus Jacobus Olivier	HNP
1951 by	H. R. H. du Plessis	National
1953	H. R. H. du Plessis	National
1958	H. R. H. du Plessis	National
1961	H. R. H. du Plessis	National
1966	H. R. H. du Plessis	National
1970	H. R. H. du Plessis	National
1974	Jan Hendrik Hoon	National
1977	Jan Hendrik Hoon	National
1981	Jan Hendrik Hoon	National
1982	Jan Hendrik Hoon	Conservative
1987	P. J. Swanepoel	National
1989	Jan Hendrik Hoon	Conservative
1994	constituency abolished	

== Detailed results ==
=== Elections in the 1920s ===
General election 1929: Kuruman
Party	Candidate	Votes	%	±%
National	W. B. de Villiers	1,677	53.0	New
South African	G. M. H. Barrell	1,353	42.8	New
Rejected ballots		133	4.2	N/A
Majority		324	10.2	N/A
Turnout		3,163	89.0	N/A
National win (new seat)				

Kuruman by-election, 30 July 1929
Party	Candidate	Votes	%	±%
National	H. J. C. de Jager	1,607	54.9	+1.9
South African	G. M. H. Barrell	1,267	43.3	+0.5
Rejected ballots		51	1.7	-2.5
Majority		550	11.6	+1.4
Turnout		2,925	82.6	−6.4
National hold		Swing	+0.7	

=== Elections in the 1930s ===
General election 1933: Kuruman
Party	Candidate	Votes	%	±%
National	I. van W. Raubenheimer	Unopposed		
National hold				

General election 1938: Kuruman
Party	Candidate	Votes	%	±%
United	Ignatius van Wijk Raubenheimer	2,950	56.2	N/A
Purified National	J. C. C. Minnie	2,236	42.6	New
Rejected ballots		63	1.2	N/A
Majority		319	13.6	N/A
Turnout		5,249	88.6	N/A
United hold		Swing	N/A	

=== Elections in the 1940s ===
Kuruman by-election, 7 February 1940
Party	Candidate	Votes	%	±%
Reunited National	Philippus Jacobus Olivier	3,255	56.5	+13.9
United	T. J. B. Melville	2,452	42.6	−13.6
Rejected ballots		54	0.9	-0.3
Majority		803	13.9	N/A
Turnout		5,761	92.5	+3.9
Reunited National gain from United		Swing	+13.8	
