= Koffiehuis =

Theatres in South Africa

The Koffiehuis (/ˈkɒfiheɪs/; Afrikaans for "coffee house") in Cape Town, South Africa, was used for amateur theatre beginning in 1915, among other things for the celebrated Koffiehuis concerts.

On May 11, 1934, the Afrikaans Theatre Society (Afrikaans: Kaapstadse Afrikaanse Toneelvereniging (KAT)) held its first performances there - productions of Rooibruin Blare and Ruwe Erts, both by Henry Allan Fagan. The KAT performed plays in the space until 1940.
