= Barkly (House of Assembly of South Africa constituency) =

Former electoral district of the House of Assembly in South Africa

- Former constituency for the South African House of Assembly
- Province: Cape of Good Hope
- Electorate: 3,628 (1924)

Former constituency
- Created: 1910
- Abolished: 1929
- Number of members: 1
- Last MHA: W. B. de Villiers (NP)

Barkly was a constituency in the Cape Province of South Africa, which existed from 1910 to 1929. Named after the town of Barkly West, the seat covered the rural area surrounding Kimberley in what was formerly known as Griqualand West. Throughout its existence it elected one member to the House of Assembly and one to the Cape Provincial Council.

== Franchise notes ==
When the Union of South Africa was formed in 1910, the electoral qualifications in use in each pre-existing colony were kept in place. The Cape Colony had implemented a “colour-blind” franchise known as the Cape Qualified Franchise, which included all adult literate men owning more than £75 worth of property (controversially raised from £25 in 1892), and this initially remained in effect after the colony became the Cape Province. As of 1908, 22,784 out of 152,221 electors in the Cape Colony were “Native or Coloured”. Eligibility to serve in Parliament and the Provincial Council, however, was restricted to whites from 1910 onward.

The first challenge to the Cape Qualified Franchise came with the Women's Enfranchisement Act, 1930 and the Franchise Laws Amendment Act, 1931, which extended the vote to women and removed property qualifications for the white population only – non-white voters remained subject to the earlier restrictions. In 1936, the Representation of Natives Act removed all black voters from the common electoral roll and introduced three “Native Representative Members”, white MPs elected by the black voters of the province and meant to represent their interests in particular. A similar provision was made for Coloured voters with the Separate Representation of Voters Act, 1951, and although this law was challenged by the courts, it went into effect in time for the 1958 general election, which was thus held with all-white voter rolls for the first time in South African history. The all-white franchise would continue until the end of apartheid and the introduction of universal suffrage in 1994.

== History ==
For much of its short history, Barkly was a marginal seat, switching hands at every election except 1915. Its original Unionist MP, Arnold Hirst Watkins, was unopposed in 1910, survived a challenge from the National Party in 1915, and lost the seat in a three-cornered race against the NP and the South African Party in 1920. In 1921, the Unionist Party merged with the SAP, and the merged party defeated National MP W. B. de Villiers by a slim margin. In 1924, amid a nationwide swing against the SAP, de Villiers was able to retake the seat, and held it until its abolition in 1929. De Villiers stood for election in the successor seat of Kuruman as well as in Stellenbosch, and won both seats, but chose to represent Stellenbosch.

== Members ==
Election	Member	Party
1910	Arnold Hirst Watkins	Unionist
1915	Arnold Hirst Watkins	Unionist
1920	W. B. de Villiers	National Party
1921	P. E. Scholtz	South African
1924	W. B. de Villiers	National Party
1929	constituency abolished	

== Detailed results ==
=== Elections in the 1910s ===
General election 1910: Barkly
Party	Candidate	Votes	%	±%
Unionist	A. H. Watkins	Unopposed		
Unionist win (new seat)				

General election 1915: Barkly
Party	Candidate	Votes	%	±%
Unionist	A. H. Watkins	1,403	69.6	N/A
National	J. C. Scholtz	585	29.0	New
Independent	H. D. Roux	27	1.3	New
Majority		818	40.6	N/A
Turnout		2,015	64.1	N/A
Unionist hold		Swing	N/A	

=== Elections in the 1920s ===
General election 1920: Barkly
Party	Candidate	Votes	%	±%
National	W. B. de Villiers	1,238	48.9	+19.9
Unionist	A. H. Watkins	842	33.3	−36.3
South African	J. S. Kruger	452	17.9	New
Majority		396	15.6	N/A
Turnout		2,532	70.8	−5.0
National gain from Unionist		Swing	+28.1	

General election 1921: Barkly
Party	Candidate	Votes	%	±%
South African	P. E. Scholtz	1,507	50.9	+33.0
National	W. B. de Villiers	1,450	49.1	+0.2
Majority		57	0.6	N/A
Turnout		2,957	77.2	+6.4
South African gain from National		Swing	+16.6	

General election 1924: Barkly
Party	Candidate	Votes	%	±%
National	W. B. de Villiers	1,559	50.7	+1.6
South African	P. E. Scholtz	1,496	48.7	−2.2
Rejected ballots		20	0.6	N/A
Majority		63	2.0	N/A
Turnout		3,075	84.8	+7.6
National gain from South African		Swing	+1.9	
