= Arnold Hirst Watkins =

British-born South African physician and politician (1851–1926)

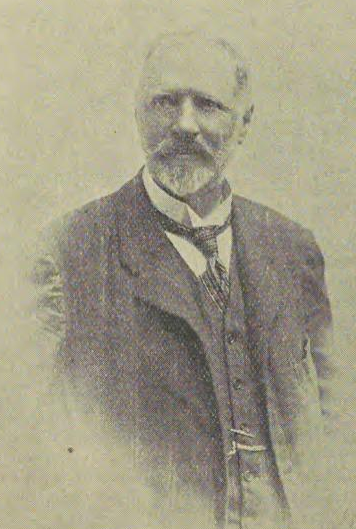

Member of the House of Assembly
- In office 1910–1920
- Preceded by: Constituency created
- Succeeded by: W. B. de Villiers
- Constituency: Barkly East

Personal details
- Born: 9 August 1851 Brentford, England
- Died: 24 December 1926 (aged 75) Cape Town, South Africa
- Party: Unionist Party
- Occupation: Medical practitioner, politician

Arnold Hirst Watkins (9 August 1851 – 24 December 1926) was a medical practitioner and politician in South Africa. He served as a member of the House of Assembly and a senator.

== Early life and family ==
He was born in Brentford in 1851 and attended school in Clevedon. Later, he studied in London and Edinburgh, where he obtained his MD degree in 1883. He left for South Africa two years later.

His sister, Mary Hirst Watkins (1836–1905), became a member of Community of St Michael and All Angels and is recognised as the founder of modern midwifery training in South Africa.

== Career ==
=== Medical ===
Watkins began to practice as a surgeon in Alice, moving to Boshof in 1888, and finally settled in Kimberley in 1895, where he worked for the next 25 years. During the Second Boer War and the First World War, he served with the British forces, treating the wounded.

Several times, he served as president of the Griqualand West branch of the British Medical Association. In 1910, he was appointed to the Medical Council of the Cape Colony and was elected its president in 1921. In 1914, he acted as president of the South African Medical Congress in Kimberley.

=== Political ===
He first contested the 1898 Cape Colony parliamentary election as an independent Progressive candidate for Kimberley constituency but was not elected. In the 1910 South African general election, was elected to the House of Assembly as a member of the Unionist party for Barkly East. He was re-elected in 1915 but lost the seat in 1920 to Wilhelm Bruckner de Villiers of the National Party. He became senator in 1921.

== Personal life ==
Watkins regularly contributed to the South African Medical Journal and wrote a novel, From Farm to Forum, in 1906. He was married twice but did not have any children.
