= Lexikos =

Academic journal for lexicography

- Discipline: Lexicography
- Language: English, Afrikaans, Dutch, French, German
- Edited by: Hugues Steve Ndinga-Koumba-Binza, Danie J. Prinsloo and Elsabé Taljard

Publication details
- History: 1991–present
- Publisher: Bureau of the WAT (Republic of South Africa)
- Frequency: Annually
- Impact factor: 0.667 (2009)

Standard abbreviations
- ISO 4: Lexikos

Indexing
- ISSN: 1684-4904
- OCLC no.: 474558959

Links
- Journal homepage

Lexikos is a peer-reviewed academic journal in the field of lexicography, established in 1991. It is published by Bureau of the Woordeboek van die Afrikaanse Taal of the association the African Association for Lexicography. It became the official journal of the latter in 1996. It appears annually and publishes contributions in English, Afrikaans, Dutch, French and German (with abstracts in English). Since the retirement of Johan C.M.D. du Plessis in 2010, a team of three rotating editors was put in place. The team takes joint responsibility of each issue, with one member of the team being appointed as editor in chief annually. The current team members are Danie Prinsloo, Elsabé Taljard and Steve Ndinga-Koumba-Binza.

== Aims and scope ==
Being the only lexicographic journal in Africa, Lexikos aims at stimulating discussion among researchers both on the continent and in the other parts of the world. Its scope encompasses not only lexicography, but also its relations with other fields, such as computer science or general linguistics.

The journal publishes the following types of contributions:

- Research papers
- Contemplative articles, reflecting on existing research and theories
- Review articles and reviews
- Discussions of projects
- Lexiconotes - short articles concerning various practical problems and suggestions
- Lexicovaria - announcements and press releases aimed at practicing lexicographers
- Reports on workshops and conferences

== Abstracting and indexing ==
The journal is indexed in the following services:

- Arts and Humanities Citation Index
- Current Contents
- Journal Citation Reports, Social Sciences Edition
- Linguistic Bibliography
- Linguistics Abstracts Online
- Linguistics and Language Behavior Abstracts
- MLA International Bibliography
- R.R.K. Hartmann's Bibliography of Lexicography
- Scopus
- Social Sciences Citation Index
- Social Scisearch

== See also ==
- Open access in South Africa
