= Bezuidenhout (House of Assembly of South Africa constituency) =

- Former constituency for the South African House of Assembly
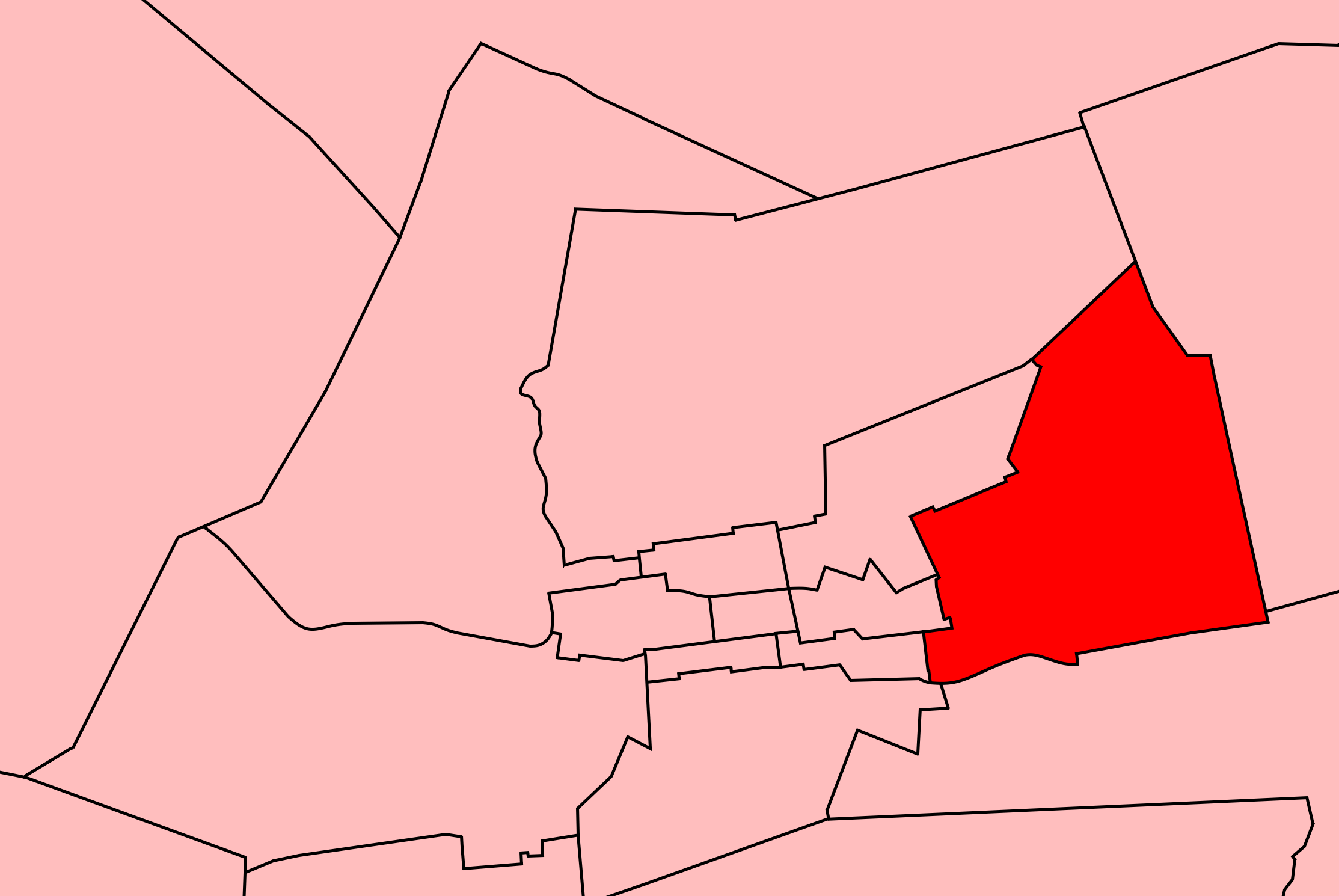
- Location of Bezuidenhout within Johannesburg (1915)
- Province: Transvaal
- Electorate: 21,310 (1989)

Former constituency
- Created: 1915
- Abolished: 1994
- Number of members: 1
- Last MHA: (DP)
- Replaced by: Gauteng

Bezuidenhout was a constituency in the Transvaal Province of South Africa, which existed from 1915 to 1994. It covered parts of the inner eastern suburbs of Johannesburg, centred on the suburb of Bezuidenhout Valley. Throughout its existence it elected one member to the House of Assembly and one to the Transvaal Provincial Council.

== Franchise notes ==
When the Union of South Africa was formed in 1910, the electoral qualifications in use in each pre-existing colony were kept in place. In the Transvaal Colony, and its predecessor the South African Republic, the vote was restricted to white men, and as such, elections in the Transvaal Province were held on a whites-only franchise from the beginning. The franchise was also restricted by property and education qualifications until the 1933 general election, following the passage of the Women's Enfranchisement Act, 1930 and the Franchise Laws Amendment Act, 1931. From then on, the franchise was given to all white citizens aged 21 or over. Non-whites remained disenfranchised until the end of apartheid and the introduction of universal suffrage in 1994.

== History ==
Bezuidenhout was created in 1915, largely out of the abolished seat of Jeppes, and was closely fought between the Labour and Unionist (later South African) parties throughout its early history. In its first election, Unionist candidate L. Blackwell narrowly defeated Labour leader Frederic Creswell, and after a short-lived Labour victory in 1920, the seat was retaken by Blackwell for the SAP, which (along with its descendants) would hold it for nearly the entire rest of its existence. Its MP from 1961 until 1981 was Japie Basson, who was noted for his colourful personality and frequent changes in party affiliation. After being expelled from the Progressive Federal Party for supporting P. W. Botha’s constitutional reforms, Basson left the House of Assembly in 1981, but the seat stayed with the PFP. In 1987, along with several other Johannesburg seats, it fell to the Nationals, but the newly-founded Democratic Party regained it in 1989 and held it until the end of apartheid.

== Members ==
Election	Member	Party
1915	Leslie Blackwell	Unionist
1920	W. J. McIntyre	Labour
1921	Leslie Blackwell	SAP
1924	Leslie Blackwell	SAP
1929	Leslie Blackwell	SAP
1933	H. A. Tothill	SAP
1938	H. A. Tothill	United Party
1943	H. A. Tothill	United Party
1948	H. A. Tothill	United Party
1953	A. E. Trollip	United Party
1958	Hyman Miller	United Party
1961	Japie Basson	National Union
1962	Japie Basson	United Party
1966	Japie Basson	United Party
1970	Japie Basson	United Party
1974	Japie Basson	United Party
1977	Japie Basson	PFP
1981	Reuben Sive	PFP
1987	H. J. Bekker	National Party
1989	G. C. Engel	Democratic Party
1994	Constituency abolished	

== Detailed results ==
=== Elections in the 1910s ===
General election 1915: Bezuidenhout
Party	Candidate	Votes	%	±%
Unionist	Leslie Blackwell	1,165	44.7	New
Labour	Frederic Creswell	1,152	44.2	New
National	J. H. L. Schuman	289	11.1	New
Majority		13	0.5	N/A
Turnout		2,606	78.1	N/A
Unionist win (new seat)				

=== Elections in the 1920s ===
General election 1920: Bezuidenhout
Party	Candidate	Votes	%	±%
Labour	W. J. McIntyre	1,031	49.7	+5.5
Unionist	Leslie Blackwell	810	39.0	−5.7
National	E. C. O. du Plooy	231	11.1	0.0
Majority		851	10.7	+10.2
Turnout		2,072	67.6	−10.5
Labour gain from Unionist		Swing	+5.6	

General election 1921: Bezuidenhout
Party	Candidate	Votes	%	±%
South African	Leslie Blackwell	1,222	57.8	+18.8
Labour	W. J. McIntyre	892	42.2	−7.5
Majority		230	15.6	N/A
Turnout		2,114	66.3	−1.3
South African gain from Labour		Swing	+12.3	

General election 1924: Bezuidenhout
Party	Candidate	Votes	%	±%
South African	Leslie Blackwell	1,388	52.2	−5.6
Labour	W. J. McIntyre	1,261	47.5	+5.3
Rejected ballots		7	0.3	N/A
Majority		230	4.7	−10.9
Turnout		2,656	81.6	+15.3
South African hold		Swing	-5.5	

General election 1929: Bezuidenhout
Party	Candidate	Votes	%	±%
South African	Leslie Blackwell	1,580	63.0	+10.8
Labour (Creswell)	C. H. Hayward	925	36.9	−10.6
Rejected ballots		5	0.1	-0.2
Majority		655	26.1	+21.4
Turnout		2,510	79.5	−2.1
South African hold		Swing	+10.7	

=== Elections in the 1930s ===
General election 1933: Bezuidenhout
Party	Candidate	Votes	%	±%
South African	H. A. Tothill	2,249	56.9	−6.1
Roos	G. Krogh	1,075	27.2	New
Labour (N.C.)	A. Hattingh	585	14.8	New
Rejected ballots		44	1.1	+1.0
Majority		1,174	29.7	N/A
Turnout		3,953	60.7	−18.8
South African hold		Swing	N/A	

General election 1938: Bezuidenhout
Party	Candidate	Votes	%	±%
United	H. A. Tothill	3,867	67.9	+8.0
Dominion	H. G. Trollip	1,134	19.9	New
Labour	A. S. Kotze	668	11.7	−3.1
Independent	S. S. Friedman	8	0.1	New
Rejected ballots		21	0.4	-0.7
Majority		2,733	48.0	N/A
Turnout		5,698	70.6	+9.9
United hold		Swing	N/A	

=== Elections in the 1940s ===
General election 1943: Bezuidenhout
Party	Candidate	Votes	%	±%
United	H. A. Tothill	5,925	87.6	+19.4
Reunited National	G. J. Fourie	837	12.4	New
Majority		5,088	75.2	N/A
Turnout		6,762	77.8	+7.2
United hold		Swing	N/A	
