= Hannes Fagan =

South African judge

The Honourable Hannes Fagan

Deputy Judge President of the Cape Provincial Division of the Supreme Court of South Africa
- In office 1992–1997
- Preceded by: New position
- Succeeded by: Edwin King

Judge of the High Court of South Africa, Cape Provincial Division
- In office 1977–1992

Personal details
- Born: Johannes Jacobus Fagan; 5 August 1927 Rondebosch, Cape Province, Union of South Africa
- Died: 28 October 2014 (aged 87) Cape Town, Western Cape, South Africa
- Relations: Henry Allan Fagan (father)
- Education: University of Cape Town; Oxford University

Johannes Jacobus "Hannes" Fagan SC (5 August 1927 – 28 October 2014) was a judge of the High Court of South Africa and Deputy Judge President of the Western Cape High Court.

== Early life and education ==
Fagan was born in Rondebosch, the youngest son of Henry Allan Fagan and Jessie "Queeny" Theron. He attended Jan van Riebeeck High School in Cape Town and matriculated in 1944. He then enrolled at the University of Cape Town, obtaining a BA degree in 1947 and a LLB degree in 1949. From Cape Town he went to the United Kingdom and furthered his studies at Oxford University, obtaining a Bachelor of Civil Law degree in 1952.

== Career ==
Fagan began practicing as an advocate in October 1952 as a member of the Cape Bar and in 1971 he was granted an appointment as Senior Counsel. In 1974, he was appointed as an acting judge in the Cape Provincial Division and three years later he became a permanent judge. In 1992, he was appointed as deputy judge president of the Cape Province Division and served in this position until 1997, when he retired.

Fagan was appointed the Inspecting Judge of Correctional Services in April 2000. His responsibilities included inspecting and arranging for the inspection of prisons in order to report on the treatment of prisoners, their conditions and any corrupt or dishonest practices in prisons.

== Personal life ==
Fagan married Sheila Ina Wille and four sons were born from the marriage.
