= Stellenbosch (House of Assembly of South Africa constituency) =

South African constituency, 1910–1994

- Former constituency for the South African House of Assembly
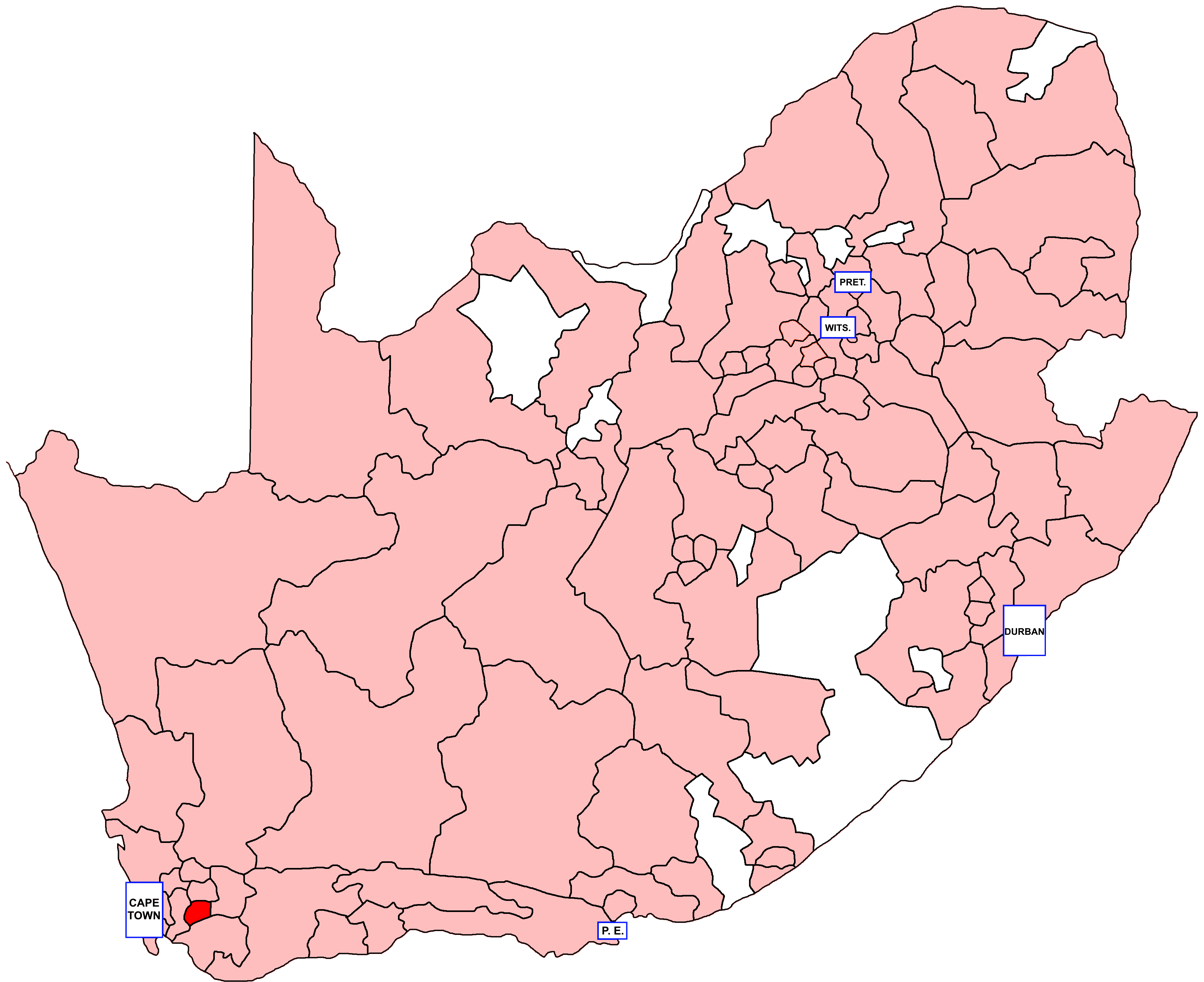
- Location of Stellenbosch within South Africa (1981)
- Province: Cape of Good Hope
- Electorate: 13,830 (1989)

Former constituency
- Created: 1910
- Abolished: 1994
- Number of members: 1
- Last MHA: Piet Marais (NP)
- Replaced by: Western Cape

Stellenbosch was a constituency in the Cape Province of South Africa, which existed from 1910 to 1994. The constituency covered a part of the Boland region centred on the university town of Stellenbosch. Throughout its existence it elected one member to the House of Assembly and one to the Cape Provincial Council.

== Franchise notes ==
When the Union of South Africa was formed in 1910, the electoral qualifications in use in each pre-existing colony were kept in place. The Cape Colony had implemented a “colour-blind” franchise known as the Cape Qualified Franchise, which included all adult literate men owning more than £75 worth of property (controversially raised from £25 in 1892), and this initially remained in effect after the colony became the Cape Province. As of 1908, 22,784 out of 152,221 electors in the Cape Colony were “Native or Coloured”. Eligibility to serve in Parliament and the Provincial Council, however, was restricted to whites from 1910 onward.

The first challenge to the Cape Qualified Franchise came with the Women's Enfranchisement Act, 1930 and the Franchise Laws Amendment Act, 1931, which extended the vote to women and removed property qualifications for the white population only – non-white voters remained subject to the earlier restrictions. In 1936, the Representation of Natives Act removed all black voters from the common electoral roll and introduced three “Native Representative Members”, white MPs elected by the black voters of the province and meant to represent their interests in particular. A similar provision was made for Coloured voters with the Separate Representation of Voters Act, 1951, and although this law was challenged by the courts, it went into effect in time for the 1958 general election, which was thus held with all-white voter rolls for the first time in South African history. The all-white franchise would continue until the end of apartheid and the introduction of universal suffrage in 1994.

== History ==
Stellenbosch, like the rest of the Western Cape, started out as a safe seat for the South African Party and over time gradually became a safe seat for the National Party. Its most notable early MP was John X. Merriman, the last Prime Minister of the Cape Colony, who notably had fought to apply the Cape Qualified Franchise across South Africa, and was one of few MPs to vote against the Natives Land Act, 1913. Merriman was in his seventies by the time he represented Stellenbosch, and stood down at the 1924 election, but the SAP continued to hold the seat for one more term before losing it to the NP in 1929. W. B. de Villiers, Stellenbosch’s first Nationalist MP, was among the 19 Nationalists who joined D. F. Malan’s Purified National Party, but this was evidently a bridge too far for Stellenbosch’s electorate, who narrowly elected United Party candidate Henry Allan Fagan over him in 1938.

Fagan, a protégé of J. B. M. Hertzog, followed Hertzog back into the National Party when South Africa entered the Second World War, and from then on, Stellenbosch would consistently be held by the NP. Its longest-serving MP, Hennie Smit (not to be confused with the later George MP of the same name), served in the cabinets of John Vorster and P. W. Botha, and was known as a verlig (moderate) NP member. He resigned from the House in 1982 to take up a post on the newly-created President's Council, and was replaced by fellow moderate Piet Marais, who served as Minister of Education under F. W. de Klerk and was involved in the drafting of the post-apartheid constitution.

== Members ==
Election	Member	Party
1910	J. H. Marais	South African
1915	John X. Merriman	South African
1920	John X. Merriman	South African
1921	John X. Merriman	South African
1924	J. P. Louw	South African
1929	W. B. de Villiers	National
1933	W. B. de Villiers	National
1934	W. B. de Villiers	GNP
1938	Henry Allan Fagan	United
1939	Henry Allan Fagan	HNP
1943	Karl Bremer	HNP
1948	Paul Roos	HNP
1948 by	J. A. Loubser	HNP
1953	Otto du Plessis	National
1958	Otto du Plessis	National
1961	H. H. Smit	National
1966	H. H. Smit	National
1970	H. H. Smit	National
1974	H. H. Smit	National
1977	H. H. Smit	National
1981	H. H. Smit	National
1982 by	Piet Marais	National
1987	Piet Marais	National
1989	Piet Marais	National
1994	constituency abolished	

== Detailed results ==
=== Elections in the 1910s ===
General election 1910: Stellenbosch
Party	Candidate	Votes	%	±%
South African	J. H. Marais	1,134	53.7	New
Ind. South African	W. A. Krige	976	46.3	New
Majority		158	7.4	N/A
South African win (new seat)				

General election 1915: Stellenbosch
Party	Candidate	Votes	%	±%
South African	John X. Merriman	1,674	66.2	+12.5
National	C. L. Marais	856	33.8	New
Majority		818	32.4	N/A
Turnout		2,530	87.4	N/A
South African hold		Swing	N/A	

=== Elections in the 1920s ===
General election 1920: Stellenbosch
Party	Candidate	Votes	%	±%
South African	John X. Merriman	1,810	62.5	−3.7
National	P. de Waal	996	34.4	+0.6
Independent	P. B. Smith	92	3.2	New
Majority		814	28.1	−4.3
Turnout		2,898	76.3	−11.1
South African hold		Swing	-2.2	

General election 1921: Stellenbosch
Party	Candidate	Votes	%	±%
South African	John X. Merriman	Unopposed		
South African hold				

General election 1924: Stellenbosch
Party	Candidate	Votes	%	±%
South African	J. P. Louw	2,160	55.5	N/A
National	Paul Sauer	1,690	43.4	New
Rejected ballots		41	1.1	N/A
Majority		470	12.1	N/A
Turnout		3,891	86.9	N/A
South African hold		Swing	N/A	

General election 1929: Stellenbosch
Party	Candidate	Votes	%	±%
National	W. B. de Villiers	2,013	52.7	+9.3
South African	J. P. Louw	1,745	45.7	−9.8
Rejected ballots		64	1.6	+0.5
Majority		268	7.0	N/A
Turnout		3,822	89.1	+2.2
National gain from South African		Swing	+9.6	

=== Elections in the 1930s ===
General election 1933: Stellenbosch
Party	Candidate	Votes	%	±%
National	W. B. de Villiers	Unopposed		
National hold				

General election 1938: Stellenbosch
Party	Candidate	Votes	%	±%
United	Henry Allan Fagan	3,734	49.8	New
Purified National	W. B. de Villiers	3,704	49.4	N/A
Rejected ballots		57	0.8	N/A
Majority		30	0.4	N/A
Turnout		7,495	91.3	N/A
United gain from Purified National		Swing	N/A	
