= Fagan Commission =

South African commission on race relations

The Native Laws Commission, commonly known as the Fagan Commission, was appointed by the South African Government in 1946 to investigate changes to the system of segregation. Its members were Henry Allan Fagan, A. S. Welsh, A. L. Barrett, E. E. von Maltitz, and S. J. Parsons. It has been described as "[a]rguably the most liberal official document produced in the segregation era."

== The report ==
The commission's main recommendation was that "influx control" of African people to urban areas should be relaxed. This in turn would increase the flow of labour and prevent the problem of migrant labour living in distant rural areas. Another recommendation was the creation of a stabilised population of African workers within urban areas to create a reliable workforce for business as well as an increased consumer base for retailers.

The report was published at a time when Jan Smuts' popularity was low and his detractors had more support. In response, the National Party created their own commission, called the Sauer Commission. Its report suggested the exact opposite of the Fagan Commission: segregation should continue and be implemented across all social and economic areas of life. The rise of postwar apartheid can be attributed to the Sauer commission.
