= Gideon Joubert =

South African writer and journalist (1923–2010)

- Born: 4 September 1923; Stellenbosch, Cape Province, South Africa
- Died: 27 October 2010 (aged 87); Somerset-West, Western Cape, South Africa

Gideon Joubert (4 September 1923 – 27 October 2010) was a South African writer and journalist (at Die Burger) who was known for his intelligent design-opinions, especially present in his book, Die Groot Gedagte, which was his biggest success.

== Life ==
Joubert was born and grew up on his parents' wine farm near Stellenbosch. He attended school at Paul Roos Gymnasium in Stellenbosch. He studied Afrikaans, Dutch, English and Psychology at Stellenbosch University. In his second year he interrupted his studies to work as a deckhand on a sailing ship. After a year he resumed his studies and obtained a BA at Stellenbosch University. Gideon Joubert worked as a reporter at Die Burger. From 1951 he served as officer at the South African Navy, where he played a major role (with many others) to assist in making it become more bilingual. He was one of the founders of the Naval Gymnasium at Saldanha Bay and became later its commanding officer. He founded and chaired the Fleet Language Board. As the founder and chairman of South Africa's first diving school, he also became South Africa's first frogman. After sixteen years of service, he retired with the rank of commander, however he began work again for Die Burger until his second and final retirement.

Joubert was much involved in cultural and language matters. He was member of the executive board of Vriende van Afrikaans, the Helderbergse Kultuurraad and other organisations. Gideon Joubert was married, had four sons and lived in Heldervue, Somerset West. He was well known as an authority in wine circles and served on award panels. Gideon founded one of the oldest and most well established wine circles in South Africa, the Heerengracht Wynkring.

== Authorship ==
He authored a book, Die Groot Gedagte, about how the cosmos had come into existence. The cover of the earlier editions features a photo of M16 (also known as the Eagle Nebula). The book is mainly about how God had planned the universe and how it is unrealistic to assume that the universe had come into existence by mere chance. Unlike other Christian non-fiction works about cosmology and cosmogony, Die Groot Gedagte does not do away with the Big Bang theory, but rather suggests that the Big Bang was the result of a greater Intelligence which had planned how the universe would turn out. The book has received widespread positive responses, although some have criticized the book because for its mixture of intelligent design theory and evolution theory.

== Publications ==
- Spioenduiker Frans Alberts (this youth novel was obligatory reading in South African schools)
- Die Groot Gedagte, Tafelberg, 1997 (this was the first book about the cosmos written in Afrikaans)

== Awards ==
- 1988: Insig Prize (the very first) for best scientific publication (which is not a text book) in Afrikaans in the previous ten years for Die Groot Gedagte.
- Andrew Murray Prize for religious publications
