= J. J. Smith (linguist) =

South-African linguist (1883–1949)

- Born: 5 October 1883; Tulbagh, Cape Colony
- Died: 18 June 1949 (aged 65); Cape Town, Union of South Africa
- Known for: Afrikaans language movement Die Huisgenoot; Woordeboek van die Afrikaanse Taal

Academic work
- Discipline: Linguistics; Dutch; Afrikaans
- Institutions: Stellenbosch University

Professor Johannes Jacobus "Jan" Smith (5 October 1883 − 18 June 1949) was a leading figure in the Afrikaans language movement and the compiler of the first standard Afrikaans dictionary. He was an important member of the committee which first attempted to standardize Afrikaans spelling, and was made the founding editor of Die Huisgenoot, the family magazine of the Nasionale Pers, in which early Afrikaans literature was discussed. He was a professor of languages at Stellenbosch University from 1919 until his retirement in 1945. His nephew was the politician, judge and Afrikaans writer Henry Allan Fagan.
