= Edwin King =

South African judge

The Honourable Edwin King SC

Judge President of the Western Cape High Court
- In office 1998–2000
- Preceded by: Gerald Friedman
- Succeeded by: John Hlophe

Deputy Judge President of the Western Cape High Court
- In office 1997–1998
- Preceded by: Hannes Fagan
- Succeeded by: John Hlophe

Judge of the High Court of South Africa
- In office 1986–1997

Personal details
- Born: Edwin Leslie King; 25 September 1929 London, England, United Kingdom
- Died: 28 May 2015 (aged 85) Cape Town, Western Cape, South Africa
- Education: University of Cape Town

Edwin Leslie King SC (25 September 1929 – 28 May 2015) known as 'Sharkey', was a judge of the High Court of South Africa and Judge President of the Western Cape High Court.

== Early life and education ==
King was born in London on 25 September 1929, and immigrated to South Africa as a young child. He was educated at Western Province Preparatory School where he started as a boarder in 1936, aged six and in 1943, he went on to St. Andrew's College in Grahamstown. King received his tertiary education at the University of Cape Town where he obtained his law degree.

== Career ==
King started practicing as an advocate at the Cape Province Bar in 1956. In 1977, he took silk and continued to practice until 1986. Shortly after taking silk and in 1978, he was appointed acting judge for the first time. He regularly served as an acting judge, also at the Natal Provincial Division and in 1986, he was permanently appointed as judge of the Cape Provincial Division of the Supreme Court of South Africa.

In 1994, he served on the Special Electoral Court which oversaw the 1994 South African elections. In 1997, King was appointed Deputy Judge President of the Western Cape High Court and in 1998, he was appointed Judge President of the court. He retired in 2000.

== King Commission ==
On 5 May 2000, the South African President Thabo Mbeki appointed a Commission of Inquiry into Cricket Match Fixing and Related Matters, with King as chairman. The commission, known as the King Commission, investigated the issue of match-fixing by various South African cricketers and received wide publicity, partly as a result of the actions of the South African captain Hansie Cronje.
