= National Union (South Africa) =

The National Union (Afrikaans: Nasionale Unie) was a short-lived South African political party founded in 1960 by Japie Basson after he was expelled from the ruling National Party. It was meant to provide a political home for Nationalists who had become disillusioned with J. G. Strydom and Hendrik Verwoerd's increasingly hard-line apartheid policies. Basson recruited former Chief Justice of South Africa Henry Allan Fagan to stand as the party's candidate for State President in the 1961 general election, in which the party won 6.26% of the vote but only one parliamentary seat. The party soon fizzled out and was absorbed into the United Party.

== See also ==
- Democratic Party (1973-1977) break away party from the Nationals.
