= Die Burger =

South African newspaper

- Type: Daily newspaper
- Format: Broadsheet
- Owner: Naspers
- Publisher: Naspers
- Editor: Willem Jordaan
- Founded: 1915
- Political alignment: Right-wing
- Language: Afrikaans
- Headquarters: Cape Town
- Circulation: 29,173 (Q1 2025)
- Website: dieburger.com

Die Burger (English: The Citizen) is a daily Afrikaans-language newspaper, published by Naspers. In 2008, it had a circulation of 91,665 in the Western and Eastern Cape Provinces of South Africa, but by 2025 its print circulation had declined to just to 29,173. Along with Beeld and Volksblad, it was one of three broadsheet dailies in the Media24 stable, though Beeld and Volksblad ceased print publication in December, 2024.

Traditionally, the paper has held views to the right of the political spectrum, and it served as the mouthpiece of the South African National Party — a status which declined from 1985 and ended only in 1990. Numerous editors of the paper became ministers in National Party governments. In 2015, Naspers CEO Esmare Weideman apologised for Naspers' role in apartheid, acknowledging "complicity in a morally indefensible political regime and the hurtful way in which this played out in our newsrooms and boardrooms” at the 100 year celebration of Naspers and Die Burger newspaper.

== History ==
On 18 December 1914, sixteen prominent Afrikaners gathered in Stellenbosch to discuss the establishment of a national newspaper.

With considerable financial support from local philanthropists Jannie and Christiaan Marais, who purchased a quarter of 20,000 £1 shares in the new holding company, the project soon got off the ground, with the founding of De Nasionale Pers ("the National Press") and the selection of Dr. D. F. Malan as editor of its daily paper, De Burger (Dutch for "The Citizen").

The first issue was published on 26 July 1915. It consisted of 10 pages and featured numerous graphic advertisements on the front page, seven columns, and domestic, international, cultural, and economic sections, along with a column for opinion pieces. Initially, the editorial team comprised 16 members, but this number dropped to nine within a year.

The newspaper quickly emerged as a competitor to the English-language Cape Times. All editors were proponents of the Afrikaans language and fluent in its use, which led to the appearance of the first Afrikaans-language articles as early as 1916.

Since 21 December 2024, Die Burger now serves as the only Afrikaans daily newspaper in South Africa, after the closure of titles such as Beeld (in Johannesburg and northern regions) and Volksblad (Free State + Northern Cape) as well as the weekly Rapport.

== Language ==
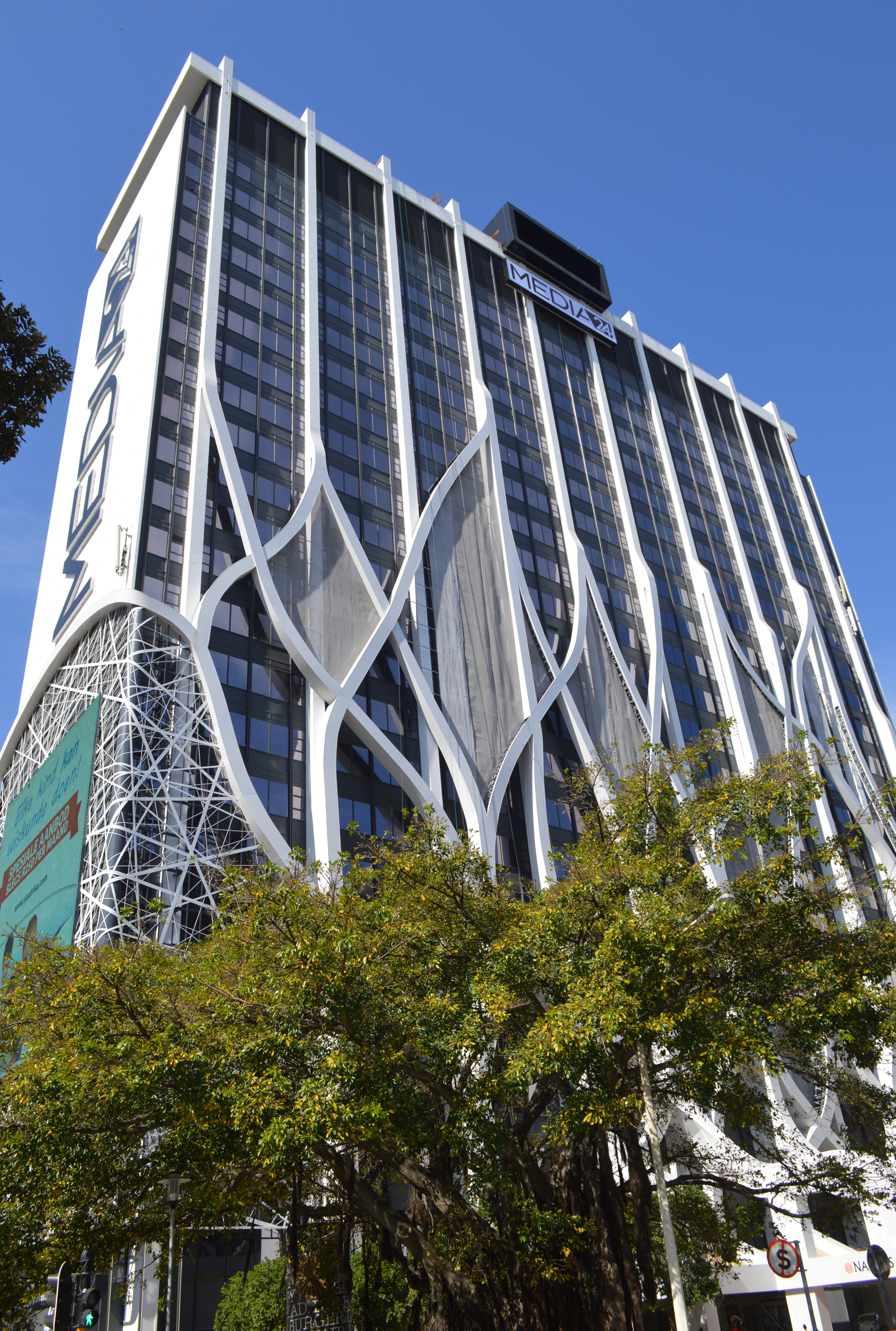
Die Burger is published at the Media24 Centre on Cape Town's Foreshore

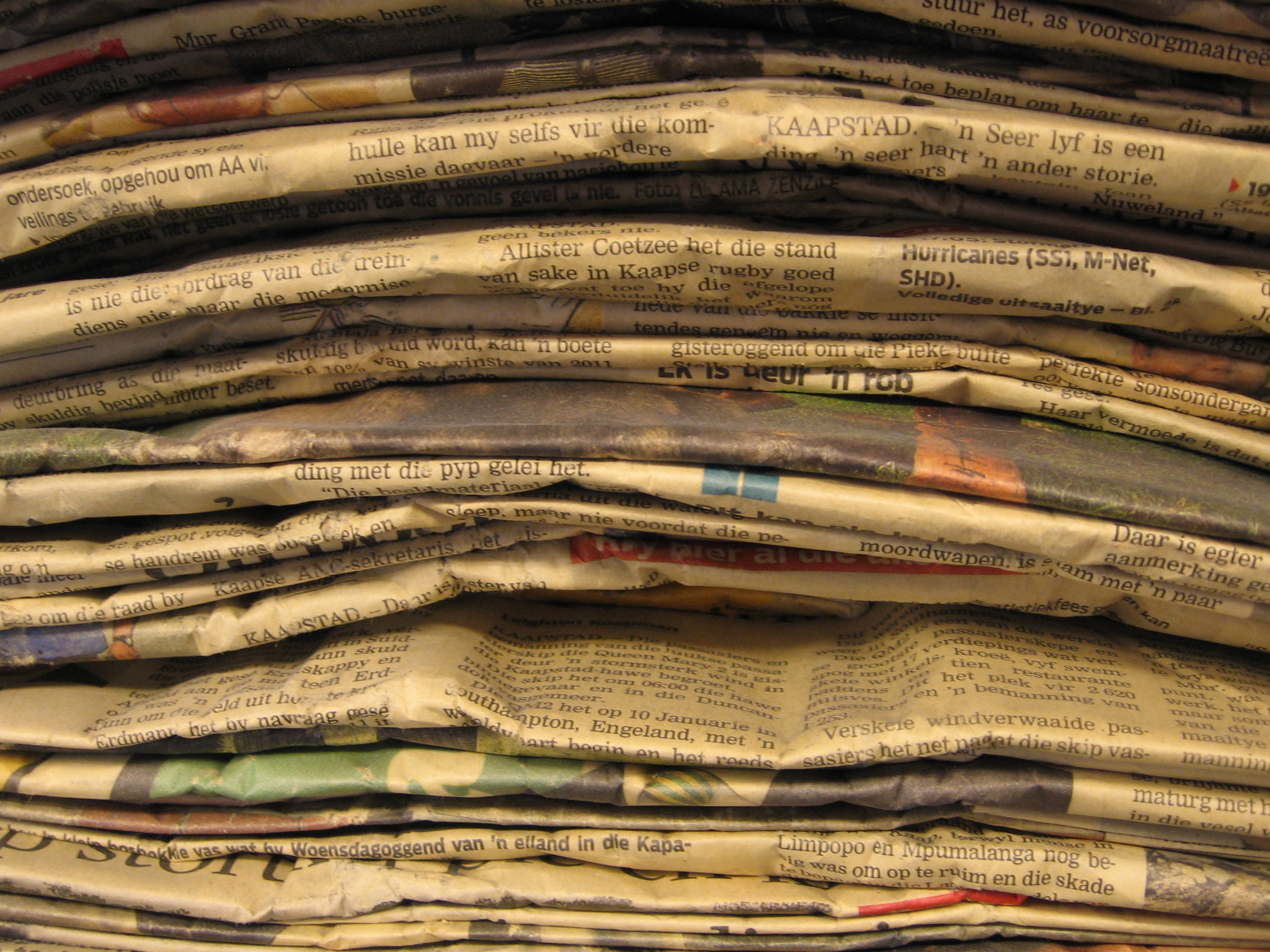
Library stack of Die Burger, 2012.

Die Burger was originally published in Dutch. In 1916, the first Afrikaans-language articles were published. In 1921, the newspaper's Dutch title (De Burger) was translated into Afrikaans (Die Burger).

== Weekly supplements ==
- Sake24 (Mon-Fri)
- Jip (Mon)
- Motors (Thur)
- Gesond! (every second Fri)
- Landbou (every second Fri, agricultural supplement)
- Versnit (Sat)
- BY (Sat)
- Eiendomme (Sat)
- Veilings (Sat)
- Snuffelgids (daily, Mon-Sat)

== Political affiliation ==
Die Burger was a newspaper that supported the nationalist cause and apartheid, and used to be the mouthpiece of the National Party. This only began to change after 1985, when then editor Piet Cillié, a staunch supporter of the government under B. J. Vorster and P. W. Botha, retired.

In 1990, the National Party was officially informed by editor Ebbe Dommisse that the paper would no longer serve as a political mouthpiece. The disaffiliation continued in 2000 with the appointment of a more progressive editor, Arrie Rossouw. In 2006, Henry Jeffreys became the first Cape Coloured editor of the paper.

== List of editors ==
- D. F. Malan (1915–24)
- Albertus Geyer (1924–45)
- Phil Weber (1945–54)
- Piet Cillié (1954–77)
- Wiets Beukes (1977–90)
- Ebbe Dommisse (1990-2000)
- Arrie Rossouw (2000–06)
- Henry Jeffreys (2006–10)
- Bun Booyens (2010-2016)
- Willem Jordaan (2016-)

== Distribution areas ==
Distribution
	2008	2013
Eastern Cape	Y	Y
Free State		
Gauteng		
Kwa-Zulu Natal		
Limpopo		
Mpumalanga		
North West		
Northern Cape	Y	Y
Western Cape	Y	Y

== Distribution figures ==
Circulation
	Net Sales
Jan - Mar 2015	56 146
Jan - Mar 2014	59 895
Oct - Dec 2012	61 484
Jul - Sep 2012	61 817
Apr - Jun 2012	60 354
Jan - Mar 2012	61 980

== Readership figures ==
Estimated Readership
	AIR
January – December 2012	497 000
July 2011 – June 2012	471 000

== See also ==
- List of newspapers in South Africa
- Hans Beukes
- Gideon Joubert

== Sources ==
- Nieman Reports at Harvard University
- Die Burger 2000/8/05
- Die Burger 2005/7/26
