= Nic Koornhof =

South African politician

Member of the National Assembly
- In office 6 May 2009 – 7 May 2019
- In office 1994–1998

Member of the House of Assembly
- In office 1987–1994

Personal details
- Citizenship: South Africa
- Party: African National Congress (since 2014)
- Other political affiliations: Congress of the People; Democratic Alliance; Democratic Party; New National Party; National Party

Nicolaas Jacobus Janse van Rensburg "Nic" Koornhof is a retired South African politician who served in Parliament from 1987 to 1998 and later from 2009 to 2019, representing various political parties. He is also a former member of the Western Cape Executive Council.

Koornhof began his career as a representative of the National Party (NP) in the apartheid-era House of Assembly and post-apartheid National Assembly from 1987 to 1998. He subsequently served in the Western Cape Executive Council from 1998 to 2001, representing the New National Party (NNP) and then the Democratic Party (DP) and Democratic Alliance (DA). He returned to the National Assembly for two further terms from 2009 to 2019, for the first term as a representative of the Congress of the People (COPE) and for the second as a representative of the African National Congress (ANC). He retired in 2019.

== Political career ==
During apartheid, Koornhof represented the governing NP in the House of Assembly, first gaining election in 1987. He remained with the NP in South Africa's first post-apartheid elections in 1994 and represented the NP in the new National Assembly. He was viewed as part of the moderate wing of the NP, then led by Roelf Meyer.

He resigned from the national Parliament in 1998 in order to join the Western Cape Executive Council, where he was Member of the Executive Council for Education. In late March 1999, he resigned from the Executive Council and from the NP (by then restyled as the NNP) in order to join the DP in the run up to the 1999 general election. He said that he had left the NNP because of its lack of commitment to the formation of a vibrant opposition. When the election was held in June, Koornhof was re-elected to the Western Cape Provincial Parliament under the banner of the DP, soon to become the DA, and he was re-appointed to the Executive Council, where he served until 2001.

Koornhof subsequently retreated from legislative politics until the 2009 general election, when he resurfaced as a candidate for the newly formed COPE. He returned to the National Assembly in a COPE seat after the election, but near the end of his term, in March 2014, announced that he would contest the next election as a member of the ANC. He was elected to an ANC seat in the 2014 general election and retired after the next election in 2019.

== Family ==
Koornhof is a cousin of politician Piet Koornhof and therefore is also related to Gerhard Koornhof.
