= Die Landstem =

South African ex-newspaper

- Type: Weekly newspaper
- Format: Broadsheet
- Publisher: Die Landstem (Eindoms) Beperk
- Editor: Piet Beukes
- Founded: 1950
- Ceased publication: 1969
- Language: Afrikaans
- Headquarters: Cape Town

Die Landstem was a weekly Afrikaans newspaper published in South Africa. It began in 1950 and ended circulation in 1969.

== History ==
The newspaper was first published in Cape Town on 4 July 1950. It published in Afrikaans and was released weekly on Wednesday mornings in Cape Town while the same issue released in Johannesburg on Thursday mornings.

At its time it was largest Afrikaner language newspaper and was distributed as far as South-West Africa, Rhodesia, and Zambia. It maintained a non-political stance to Afrikaner politics supporting no one political party and its political reporting was regarded as unbiased. It increased its circulation by including the weekly magazine Naweek. In 1955, it published a monthly women's magazine in Afrikaans called Mense.

It published special features and made good use of photos and could be described as a tabloid journalism. It also was responsible for assisting the Miss South Africa competition entry into to the Miss World competition.

It's holding company was Die Landstem (Eindoms) Beperk formed on 16 March 1951. In 1967, the newspaper became part of Afrikaanse Pers Beperk. By 1969, the newspaper was merged into Dagbreek en Sonagnuus with the latter merging into Die Beeld in 1970 and eventually becoming Rapport.
