= Bruckner de Villiers =

South African politician (1875-1948)

Wilhelm Bruckner de Villiers (16 March 1875 – 21 July 1948) was a South African politician. He was a National Party Member of Parliament for Barkly from 13 March 1920 to 31 December 1920 and again from 18 June 1924 to 30 April 1929 as well as for Stellenbosch from 13 June 1929 to 11 April 1938 when the United Party 's Henry Fagan beat him by 30 votes.

== Life ==
Bruckner de Villiers was the son of Abraham Barend de Villiers (1837–1909), a farmer, auctioneer and businessman from Paarl, member of the Afrikaner Bond, who was MP for Richmond and then Victoria West in the parliament of the Cape Colony.

In 1911 Bruckner de Villiers moved to Stellenbosch. The businessman and nationalist patron, Jannie Marais (also his brother-in-law), participated in the founding of the press group Die Nasionale Pers and that of the University of Stellenbosch. In the 1915 legislative elections he was a candidate for the National Party in Paarl, where he initially received the support of the local branch of the African Political Organization (APO), a coloured organisation, until its president Abdullah Abdurahman, also a coloured municipal councillor for the city of Cape Town, recalled that coloured people in the Orange Free State (the province where the National Party was founded by Barry Hertzog) had to carry passes. He was defeated by more than 800 votes by Andries Lourens de Jager, the outgoing MP and candidate of the South African Party.

Bruckner de Villiers took revenge against Scholtz in the 1924 election and regained the seat. However, the constituency was abolished and merged with another for the subsequent election in 1929. Bruckner de Villiers was then elected for both Kuruman and Stellenbosch, two constituencies which he won.

In Stellenbosch, Bruckner de Villiers was elected against the incumbent JP Louw, thanks to the votes of the coloured voters of the Stellenbosch constituency. He gave up the seat he had won in Kuruman to serve as the representative of the Stellenbosch constituency. He remains to this day, along with Colin Steyn, one of the few South African parliamentarians to be elected in two constituencies in the same election cycle.

In 1934 he was one of 19 National Party members who refused to merge their party with the South African Party into the United Party.

In 1938, while a candidate for the Purified National Party, whose platform proposed the withdrawal of coloureds from the general electoral rolls (a position not supported by de Villiers), he lost his seat by 30 votes to Henry Fagan (United Party).

He concluded his political career as a senator (1939 to 1948).
