= Sauer Commission =

South African commission

The Sauer Commission was a political commission in South Africa. It was created in 1948 largely in response to the Fagan Commission. It was appointed by the Herenigde Nasionale Party and favoured even stricter segregation laws.

The Sauer Commission was concerned with the 'problem' of controlling the influx of African people into urban areas. White workers, traders and merchants were concerned that this would represent a threat to their jobs and businesses, particularly since African workers would work in semi-skilled positions for a lower wage than white workers. Businesses demanded racially segregated trading zones in order to protect their businesses from competition. Numerous groups influenced this policy of 'total Apartheid', including the South African Bureau for Racial Affairs (SABRA).

Ultimately the Sauer commission did not enforce the total segregation to the extent originally envisioned. Rather, it resulted in the immediate implementation of 'practical Apartheid', which allowed some African people to enter and work in urban areas, with the complete implementation of total Apartheid envisioned as a future goal. The recommendations made by the Sauer commission were still more restrictive than those made by the Fagan Commission.

The members of the Sauer commission were: Paul Sauer, G.B.A. Gerdener, E.G. Jansen, J.J. Serfontein and M.D.C. De Wet Nel.

== Publication ==
- Verslag van die Kleurvraagstuk-Kommissie van die Herenigde Nasionale Party [Sauer Report, 1948]
