= 1961 South African general election =

- 18 October 1961

All 156 general roll seats in the House of Assembly 79 seats needed for a majority
- Registered: 1,811,160
- Turnout: 44.55% (▼29.81pp)
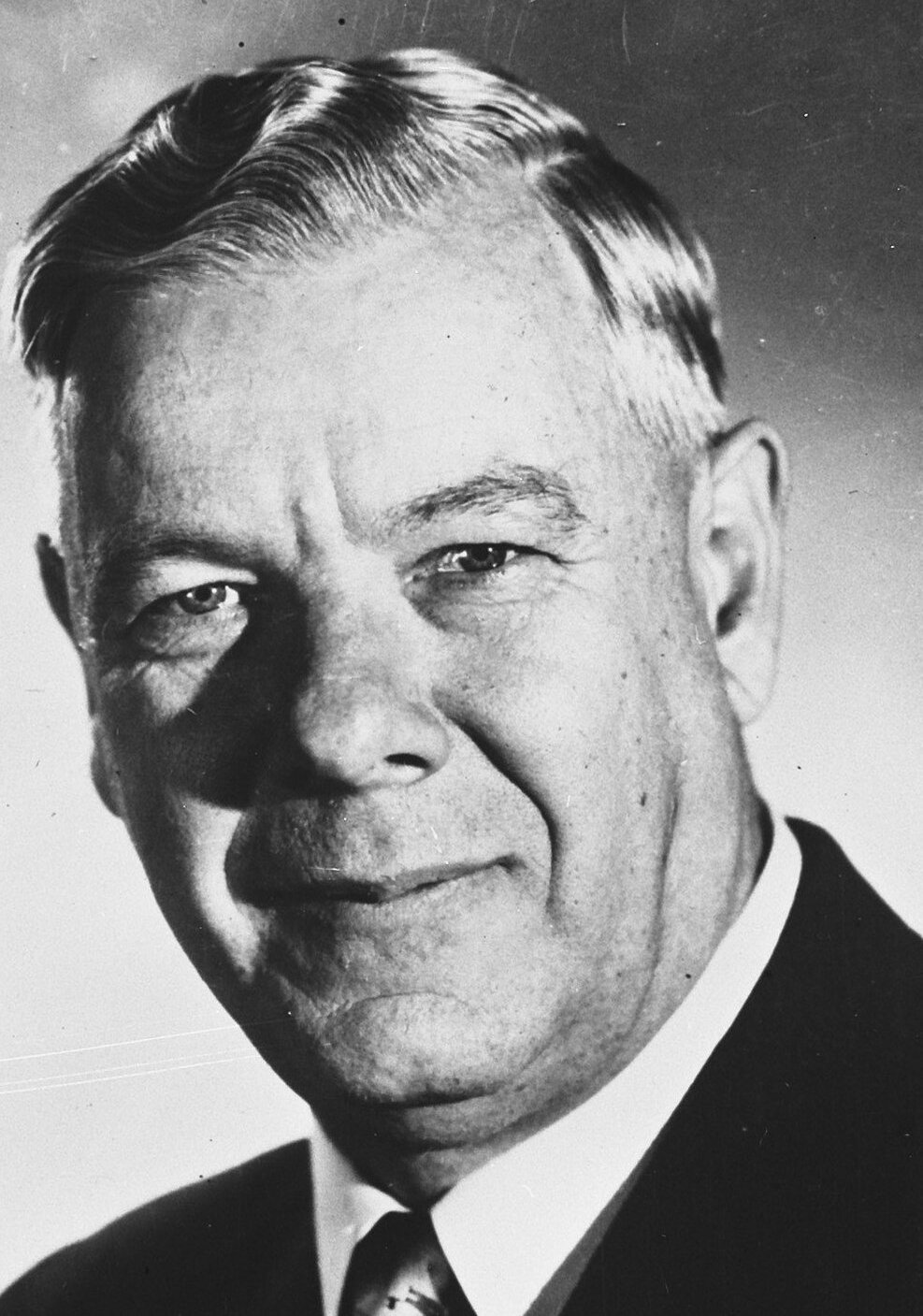

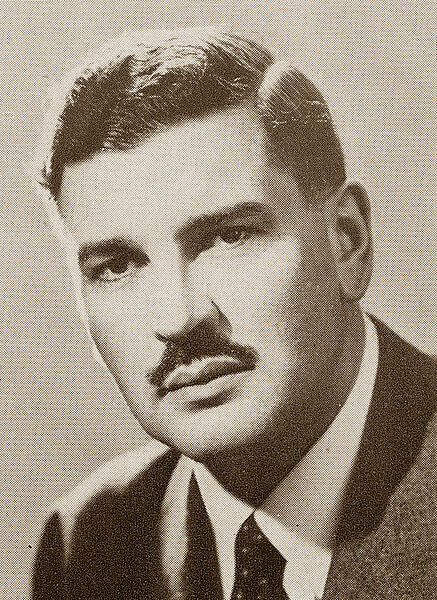

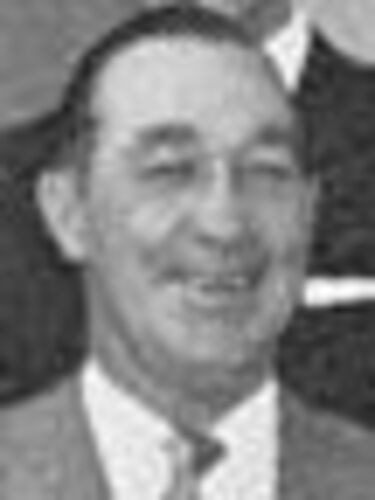

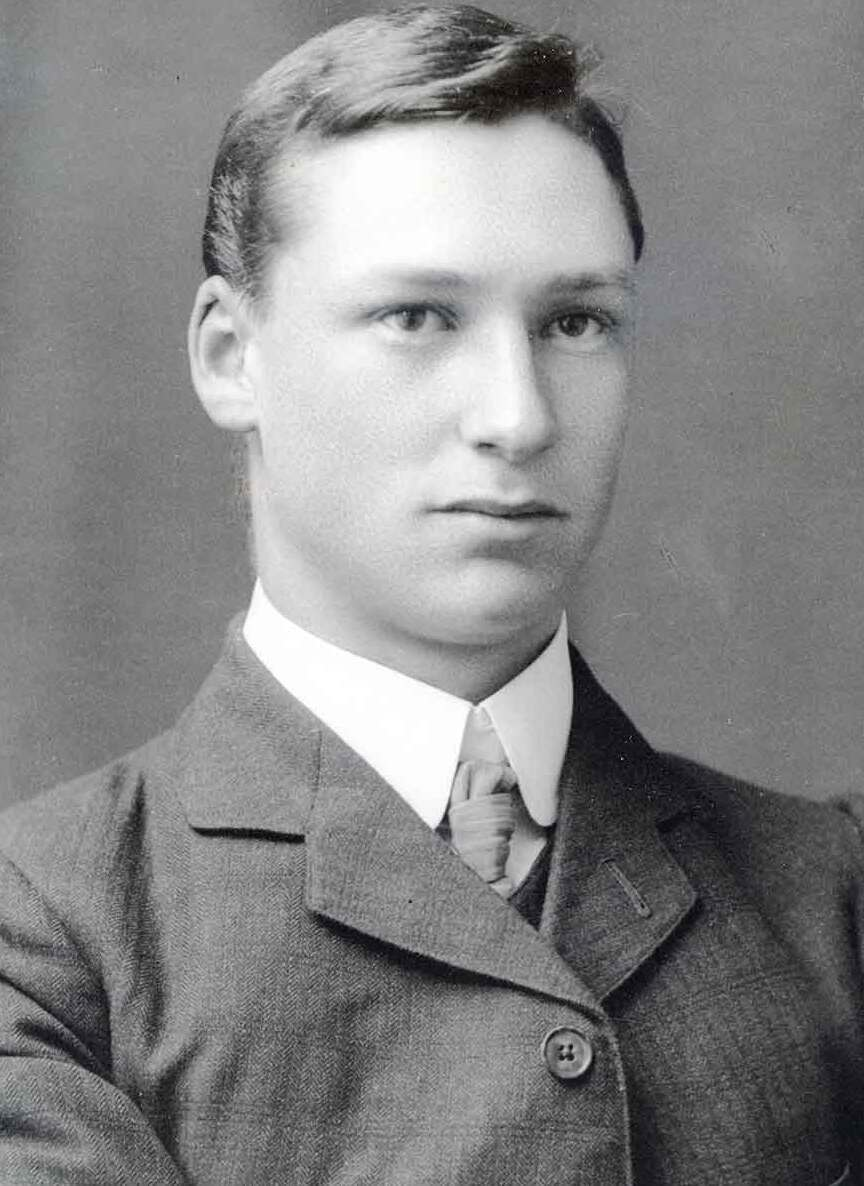
	First party	Second party
Leader	H. F. Verwoerd	De Villiers Graaff
Party	National	United
Last election	55.54%, 103 seats	42.57%, 53 seats
Seats won	105	49
Seat change	▲2	▼4
Popular vote	370,395	261,361
Percentage	46.44%	35.28%
Swing	▼9.10pp	▼7.29pp
	Third party	Fourth party
Leader	Jan Steytler	Henry Allan Fagan
Party	Progressive	National Union
Last election	Did not exist	Did not exist
Seats won	1	1
Seat change	New party	New party
Popular vote	69,045	50,279
Percentage	8.66%	6.30%
Swing	New party	New party
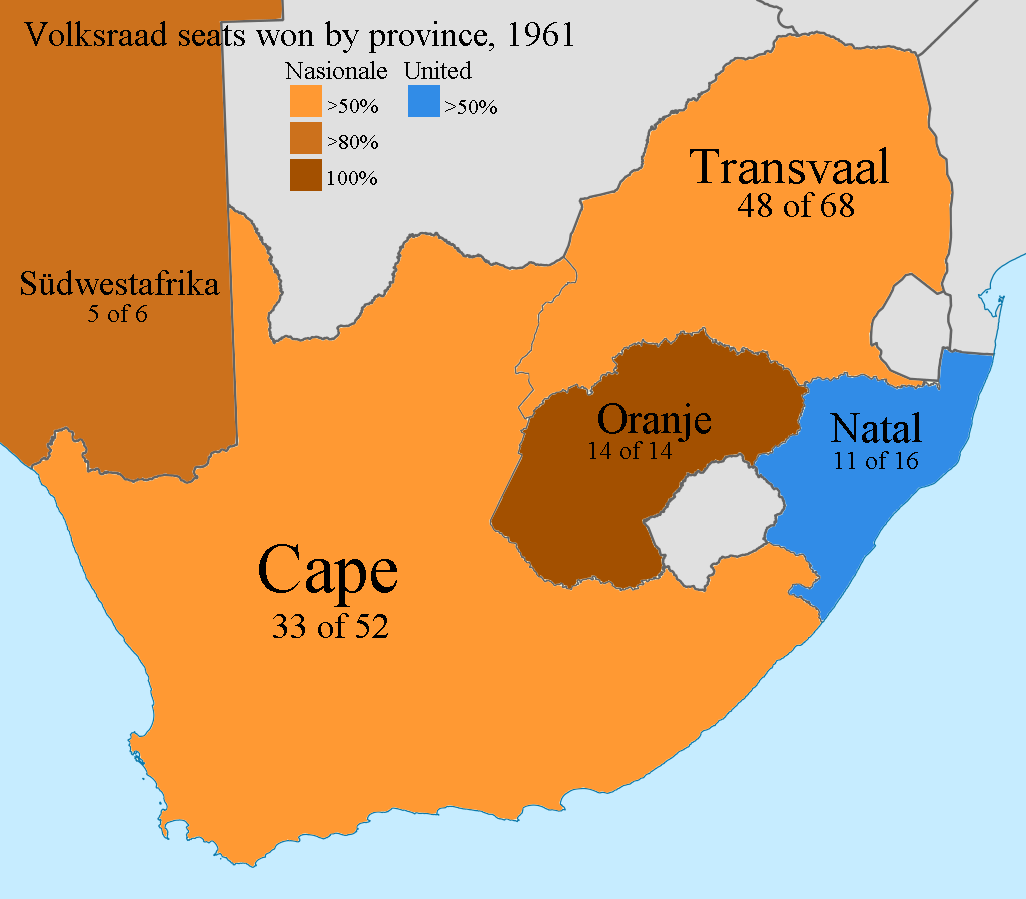
- Results by province
Prime Minister before election
H. F. Verwoerd
National
Elected Prime Minister
H. F. Verwoerd
National

General elections were held in South Africa on 18 October 1961. They were the first general elections after South Africa became a republic following the 1960 South African referendum. The National Party (NP) under H. F. Verwoerd won a majority in the House of Assembly.

The National Union Party, led by Japie Basson and ex-Chief Justice Henry Allan Fagan in alliance with the United Party, had been formed as a "bridge" to the United Party by disgrunted ex-Nationalists who were unhappy with Verwoerd's leadership, aiming at the National, Afrikaner electorate. With the exception of the constituency of Bezuidenhout, won by Basson in a landslide, the party failed and later merged with the United Party.

The elections also saw the first general election appearance of the liberal Progressive Party, which had broken away from the United Party in 1959. The new party retained one MP, in the form of Helen Suzman. She was to remain its sole parliamentary representative until 1974. Only White South Africans were allowed to vote, as non-whites had last taken part in a general election in 1953. The voting age for whites was also lowered from 21 to 18, with turnout down nearly 30 percentage points to 45%.

== Changes in franchise ==
=== End of black representation ===
During the previous Parliament the seats of the three MPs and four Senators representing black South Africans had been abolished. The 1961 election produced the first Parliament with no representation at all for black South Africans.

=== Coloured Representative Members ===
The second election for the four Coloured representative members took place on 4 October 1961, before the (white voters only) general election on 18 October 1961. Under the Separate Representation of Voters Act 1951, the members were to serve until the dissolution of the new Parliament.

The four seats were won by Independents, with United Party support. The recently formed Progressive Party did not contest the four vacancies.

=== Reduction in voting age ===
This was the first election after the passage of the Electoral Law Amendment Act, No. 30 of 1958, which reduced the voting age for white voters from 21 to 18.

== Delimitation of electoral divisions ==
The South Africa Act 1909 had provided for a delimitation commission to define the boundaries for each electoral division, for general roll voters in the four provinces. The representation by province, under the eleventh delimitation report of 1958, is set out in the table below. The figures in brackets are the number of electoral divisions in the previous (1953) delimitation. If there is no figure in brackets then the number was unchanged.

This was only the second general election, in South African history, where the boundaries were unchanged from the previous election.

Provinces	Cape	Natal	Orange Free State	Transvaal	Total
Divisions	52 (54)	16 (15)	14 (13)	68	150

== Composition at dissolution ==
At the end of the 12th Parliament elected since the Union of 1910, when it was dissolved in 1961, the House of Assembly consisted of two groups of members. White voters were represented by 156 general roll members and coloured voters in Cape Province by four white MPs known at the time as Coloured Representative Members (CRM).

The general election only affected the representatives of white voters. The other members were elected on a different date (see above).

The representation by party and province, at the dissolution was:

Province	National	United	Progressive	National Union	CRM	Total
Cape (general)	33	14	5	-	-	52
Cape (CRM)	-	-	-	-	4	4
Natal	2	11	3	-	-	16
Orange Free State	14	-	-	-	-	14
South-West Africa	5	-	-	1	-	6
Transvaal	48	17	3	-	-	68
Total	102	42	11	1	4	160

== Results ==
A total of 70 seats were uncontested, of which 50 were won by the National Party and 20 by the United Party.

Party	Votes	%	Seats	+/–
National Party	370,395	46.44	105	+2
United Party	281,361	35.28	49	–4
Progressive Party	69,045	8.66	1	New
National Union	50,279	6.30	1	New
Conservative Workers' Party	8,554	1.07	0	New
United National South West Party	6,856	0.86	0	0
Independent Republican Party	2,903	0.36	0	New
Liberal Party	2,461	0.31	0	0
Independents	5,707	0.72	0	0
Coloured Representative Members			4	0
Total	797,561	100.00	160	–3
Valid votes	797,561	99.44		
Invalid/blank votes	4,518	0.56		
Total votes	802,079	100.00		
Registered voters/turnout	1,811,160	44.29		
Source: Potgieter

=== By province ===
Province	National	United	Progressive	National Union	Independents	Total
Cape (general)	34	18	0	0	0	52
Cape (CRM)	0	0	0	0	4	4
Natal	2	14	0	0	0	16
Orange Free State	14	0	0	0	0	14
South-West Africa	6	0	0	0	0	6
Transvaal	49	17	1	1	0	68
Total	105	49	1	1	4	160

=== By electoral division ===
Province	Constituency	National	United	National Union	Progressive	Conservative Workers'	Liberal	Independent	Invalid/ blank	Total	Registered voters	Turnout
Cape of Good Hope	Albany		6,069		1,175				64	7,308	11,521	63.43
Cape of Good Hope	Aliwal	5,148	3,767						60	8,975	9,679	92.73
Cape of Good Hope	Beaufort West	Unopposed										
Cape of Good Hope	Bellville	8,274	3,995						71	12,340	14,953	82.53
Cape of Good Hope	Ceres	Unopposed										
Cape of Good Hope	Constantia		7,653				1,115		43	8,811	13,499	65.27
Cape of Good Hope	Cradock	Unopposed										
Cape of Good Hope	De Aar—Colesberg	Unopposed										
Cape of Good Hope	Fort Beaufort	4,962	3,597						41	8,600	9,388	91.61
Cape of Good Hope	George	7,624		1,379	506				45	9,554	10,967	87.12
Cape of Good Hope	Gordonia	Unopposed										
Cape of Good Hope	Graaff-Reinet	Unopposed										
Cape of Good Hope	Green Point		Unopposed									
Cape of Good Hope	Hottentots-Holland	5,806	4,264						49	10,119	10,926	92.61
Cape of Good Hope	Humansdorp	5,979	3,154						20	9,153	10,414	87.89
Cape of Good Hope	Cape Town Gardens		Unopposed									
Cape of Good Hope	Kimberley North	6,566	4,004						71	10,641	12,213	87.13
Cape of Good Hope	Kimberley South	6,359	4,925						43	11,327	12,629	89.69
Cape of Good Hope	King William’s Town		Unopposed									
Cape of Good Hope	Kuruman	Unopposed										
Cape of Good Hope	Maitland		4,610		1,688			3,703	27	10,028	12,336	81.29
Cape of Good Hope	Malmesbury	Unopposed										
Cape of Good Hope	Moorreesburg	Unopposed										
Cape of Good Hope	Mossel Bay	Unopposed										
Cape of Good Hope	Namakwaland	Unopposed										
Cape of Good Hope	East London North		6,158		2,519				58	8,735	12,984	67.28
Cape of Good Hope	East London City		6,053					1,277	40	7,370	12,304	59.90
Cape of Good Hope	Oudtshoorn	Unopposed										
Cape of Good Hope	Paarl	7,272	2,893						36	10,201	11,676	87.37
Cape of Good Hope	Parow	Unopposed										
Cape of Good Hope	Pinelands		6,433		2,881				68	9,382	12,730	73.70
Cape of Good Hope	Piketberg	Unopposed										
Cape of Good Hope	Port Elizabeth North	6,763		3,995					29	10,787	13,842	77.93
Cape of Good Hope	Port Elizabeth Central		Unopposed									
Cape of Good Hope	Port Elizabeth South		5,896		3,166				74	9,136	13,189	69.27
Cape of Good Hope	Port Elizabeth West		Unopposed									
Cape of Good Hope	Prieska	5,059	3,244						40	8,343	9,100	91.68
Cape of Good Hope	Queenstown	5,706	5,337						78	11,121	11,440	97.21
Cape of Good Hope	Rondebosch		Unopposed									
Cape of Good Hope	Sea Point		6,199		3,428				53	9,680	12,997	74.48
Cape of Good Hope	Simonstown		6,244		1,612				60	7,916	13,071	60.56
Cape of Good Hope	Somerset East	Unopposed										
Cape of Good Hope	Salt River		4,670		2,190				56	6,916	10,757	64.29
Cape of Good Hope	Stellenbosch	7,465		2,556	721				43	10,785	13,247	81.41
Cape of Good Hope	Swellendam	5,552		3,762					61	9,375	10,277	91.22
Cape of Good Hope	Transkeian Territories		Unopposed									
Cape of Good Hope	Uitenhage	Unopposed										
Cape of Good Hope	False Bay	6,731		3,781					57	10,569	12,750	82.89
Cape of Good Hope	Vasco	Unopposed										
Cape of Good Hope	Vryburg	Unopposed										
Cape of Good Hope	Worcester	6,832	3,175						56	10,063	11,424	88.09
Cape of Good Hope	Wynberg		6,311					1,911	18	8,240	11,402	72.27
Natal	Drakensberg		Unopposed									
Natal	Durban—Berea		5,451		4,568				58	10,077	12,986	77.60
Natal	Durban—Musgrave		5,181		4,222				33	9,436	12,575	75.04
Natal	Durban North		6,167		3,991				91	10,249	13,463	76.13
Natal	Durban Point		Unopposed									
Natal	Durban Central		5,349					504	43	5,896	12,167	48.46
Natal	Durban-Umbilo		Unopposed									
Natal	Durban Umlazi		Unopposed									
Natal	Natal South Coast		4,956		2,367			115	104	7,542	10,164	74.20
Natal	Newcastle	5,919		3,646					65	9,630	11,123	86.58
Natal	Pietermaritzburg District		4,014		3,839				83	7,936	11,488	69.08
Natal	Pietermaritzburg City		3,915		3,282				129	7,326	13,621	53.78
Natal	Pinetown		5,032		3,064				79	8,175	11,506	71.05
Natal	Umhlatuzana		Unopposed									
Natal	Vryheid	5,555		2,804					109	8,468	9,768	86.69
Natal	Zululand	4,200	5,856		104 (Note: Withdrew before election day)				55	10,215	11,738	87.03
Orange Free State	Bethlehem	Unopposed										
Orange Free State	Bloemfontein District	Unopposed										
Orange Free State	Bloemfontein East	7,485	3,201						16	10,702	14,830	72.16
Orange Free State	Bloemfontein West	8,076	3,645						16	11,737	14,678	79.96
Orange Free State	Fauresmith—Boshof	Unopposed										
Orange Free State	Harrismith	Unopposed										
Orange Free State	Heilbron	Unopposed										
Orange Free State	Kroonstad	7,524	1,837						65	9,426	11,133	84.67
Orange Free State	Ladybrand	Unopposed										
Orange Free State	Odendaalsrus	7,797	2,304						49	10,150	13,445	75.49
Orange Free State	Smithfield	Unopposed										
Orange Free State	Vredefort	Unopposed										
Orange Free State	Welkom	8,217	3,890						32	12,139	15,904	76.33
Orange Free State	Winburg	Unopposed										
South-West Africa	Etosha	Unopposed										
South-West Africa	Karas	2,954	2,113 (Note: United National South West Party)						26	5,093	5,722	89.01
South-West Africa	Middelland	3,264	2,135						40	5,439	6,560	82.91
South-West Africa	Namib	Unopposed										
South-West Africa	Omaruru	Unopposed										
South-West Africa	Windhoek	3,709	2,608						74	6,391	8,021	79.68
Transvaal	Alberton	7,099	2,094						29	9,222	13,429	68.67
Transvaal	Benoni		3,957		1,293				52	5,302	12,112	43.77
Transvaal	Bethal-Middelburg	5,757	2,521						51	8,329	10,216	81.53
Transvaal	Bezuidenhout	1,983		6,507					26	8,516	11,839	71.93
Transvaal	Boksburg	6,920		5,413					35	12,368	14,051	88.02
Transvaal	Brakpan	6,158	3,629						96	9,883	12,559	78.69
Transvaal	Brits	Unopposed										
Transvaal	Christiana	6,438	2,322						51	8,811	10,015	87.98
Transvaal	Edenvale	6,509	3,812						29	10,350	13,781	75.10
Transvaal	Ermelo	5,520	2,811						71	8,402	9,926	84.65
Transvaal	Florida	4,473	6,407						28	10,908	12,750	85.55
Transvaal	Geduld	7,006	3,576						33	10,615	13,922	76.25
Transvaal	Germiston	6,239				2,053			31	8,323	11,015	75.56
Transvaal	Germiston District	3,675	6,691						22	10,388	13,362	77.74
Transvaal	Groblersdal	Unopposed										
Transvaal	Heidelberg	Unopposed										
Transvaal	Hercules	Unopposed										
Transvaal	Hillbrow		5,564				1,346		45	6,955	12,690	54.81
Transvaal	Hospital		4,799					992	30	5,821	10,877	53.52
Transvaal	Houghton		4,841		5,405				69	10,315	12,771	80.77
Transvaal	Innesdal	Unopposed										
Transvaal	Jeppes		Unopposed									
Transvaal	Johannesburg North		5,413		4,541				67	10,021	13,245	75.66
Transvaal	Kempton Park	Unopposed										
Transvaal	Kensington		Unopposed									
Transvaal	Klerksdorp	8,912	3,226					108	33	12,279	15,705	78.19
Transvaal	Krugersdorp	6,023		3,831					47	9,901	12,555	78.86
Transvaal	Langlaagte	5,891				2,325			58	8,274	11,844	69.86
Transvaal	Lichtenburg	Unopposed										
Transvaal	Losberg	Unopposed										
Transvaal	Lydenburg—Barberton	5,326	2,849						79	8,254	9,758	84.59
Transvaal	Maraisburg	Unopposed										
Transvaal	Marico	5,429	2,390						54	7,873	9,061	86.89
Transvaal	Mayfair	5,431				2,039			34	7,504	11,176	67.14
Transvaal	Nelspruit	5,790		3,059					37	8,886	10,564	84.12
Transvaal	Nigel	Unopposed										
Transvaal	North East Rand		Unopposed									
Transvaal	North West Rand	6,495	4,774						29	11,298	13,118	86.13
Transvaal	Orange Grove		5,363		4,846				65	10,274	12,594	81.58
Transvaal	Parktown		5,100		5,015				65	10,180	12,458	81.71
Transvaal	Pietersburg	6,201	2,200						58	8,459	10,766	78.57
Transvaal	Potchefstroom	Unopposed										
Transvaal	Pretoria District	6,753	3,666						82	10,501	12,642	83.06
Transvaal	Pretoria East	9,155			2,622				89	11,866	16,119	73.61
Transvaal	Pretoria—Rissik	6,149	6,713						40	12,902	14,629	88.19
Transvaal	Pretoria Central	Unopposed										
Transvaal	Pretoria—Sunnyside	7,528		4,801					27	12,356	15,521	79.61
Transvaal	Pretoria West	Unopposed										
Transvaal	Prinshof	Unopposed										
Transvaal	Randfontein	6,227	3,280						120	9,627	11,772	81.78
Transvaal	Roodepoort	7,532	3,284						36	10,852	13,245	81.93
Transvaal	Rosettenville		Unopposed									
Transvaal	Rustenburg	5,886	2,544						40	8,470	10,448	81.07
Transvaal	Soutpansberg	Unopposed										
Transvaal	Springs		Unopposed									
Transvaal	Standerton	5,340	3,139						58	8,537	10,066	84.81
Transvaal	Turffontein		Unopposed									
Transvaal	Vanderbijl Park	Unopposed										
Transvaal	Ventersdorp	6,509	2,805						55	9,369	11,677	80.23
Transvaal	Vereeniging	6,465		4,745					60	11,270	13,043	86.41
Transvaal	Von Brandis		Unopposed									
Transvaal	Wakketstroom	Unopposed										
Transvaal	Waterberg	Unopposed										
Transvaal	Westdene	6,167				2,137			39	8,343	11,859	70.35
Transvaal	Witbank	Unopposed										
Transvaal	Wolmaransstad	6,611	2,142						20	8,773	10,633	82.51
Transvaal	Wonderboom	Unopposed										
Transvaal	Yeoville		Unopposed									
Source: Government Gazette 110
