= Japie Basson =

South African apartheid politician (1918–2012)

Member of the South African Parliament
- In office 1950–1980
- Constituency: Namib; Bezuidenhout

Personal details
- Born: Jacob Daniel du Plessis Basson; 25 July 1918 Paarl, Cape Province, Union of South Africa
- Died: 8 August 2012 (aged 94) Cape Town
- Party: National Party; Independent; National Union; United Party; Progressive Federal Party
- Education: Stellenbosch University

Jacob "Japie" Basson (25 July 1918 – 8 August 2012) was a South African politician who began his career with the National Party, but was later expelled from it, and became a forceful critic of the apartheid government as a member, by turns, of the United Party, Progressive Federal Party, and his own short-lived National Union. He was described as "fiery", "colourful", an "individualist", and as the "chameleon" of South African politics for his shifting partisan allegiances.

== Early life ==
Basson was born in Paarl, the Western Cape in 1918. His father was Daniel J. Basson, a South African senator. He was educated at Paarl Boys' High School and matriculated in 1935. He graduated with a BA in Law at the University of Stellenbosch in 1938. At university he became a correspondent with Die Suiderstem newspaper. His early working career was as a journalist and a political secretary in the South Africa and South-West Africa from 1939 until 1949. In 1947, he was responsible for establishing the United Party's presence in South-West Africa.

== Political career ==
He was originally elected to the House of Assembly in 1950 as National Party MP for the constituency of Namib, in what was then South African-administered South West Africa, before leaving the National Party in 1959. In 1960, he co-founded the South West Party with Ferdinand Lempp, former editor of Allgemeine Zeitung, the German language daily newspaper in the territory.

However, he later founded his own party, the National Union in 1960, which despite its opposition to many aspects of the apartheid policies of Hendrik Verwoerd, supported his government's decision to make South Africa a republic, although he declared that a republic would do Verwoerd himself no good.

Basson was elected as Bezuidenhout in Johannesburg in 1961, after merging his party with the United Party, for which he served as its foreign affairs spokesman. He would be the leader of the United Party in the Transvaal from 1975 until 1977. Following the collapse of that party, Basson led the Committee for a United Opposition, which merged with the more liberal Progressive Reform Party to form the Progressive Federal Party.

In 1980, in the wake of disagreements with the PFP over his support for the constitutional reforms of the government of P. W. Botha, he was expelled from the party caucus. This was because he had stated that he was prepared to serve on the President's Council, a body established by the Botha government to advise on a new constitution. Earlier, his party had adopted a resolution rejecting the body. He was appointed to the President's Council, serving as a member of its Constitutional Committee from 1981 to 1984, and on retirement from the council, rejoined the National Party.

== Marriage ==
Basson married Clarence Caroline Strauss. They had two daughter, Caro, married to Christo Wiese, and Esté.
