= Piet Cillié =

Petrus Johannes "Piet" Cillié (18 January 1917 – 20 October 1999) was a South African journalist and the editor of Die Burger from 1954 to 1977. He was strongly supportive of the National Party government and has been described as the "most influential thinker", alongside Hendrik Verwoerd, in the Afrikaner nationalist movement in the early decades of apartheid. For many years, Cillié wrote a popular weekly political column for Die Burger under the pseudonym "Dawie." The first of these columns appeared on 28 January 1946.
