= Woordeboek van die Afrikaanse Taal =

Afrikaans-language dictionary

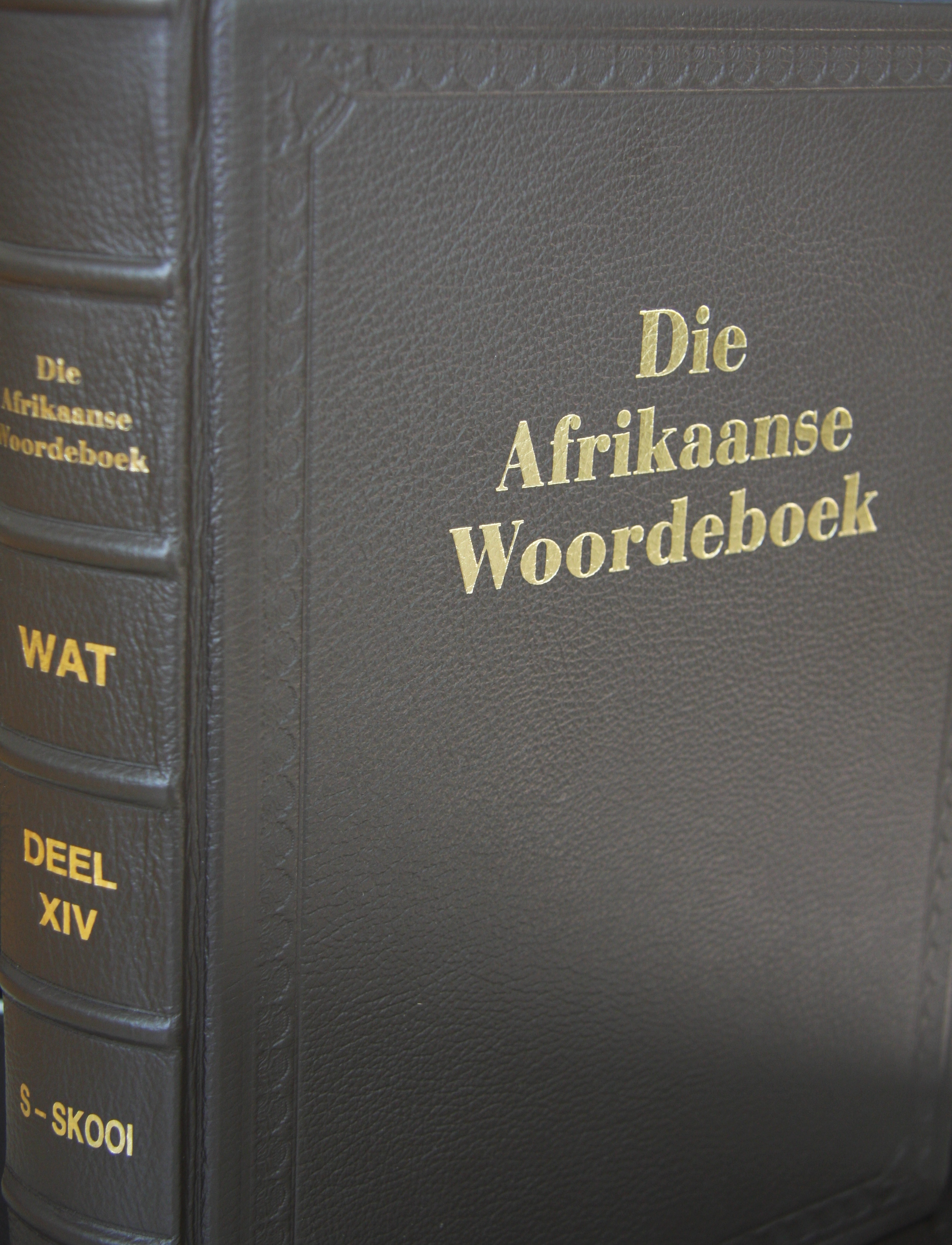
Part XIV of the WAT

Woordeboek van die Afrikaanse Taal (Dictionary of the Afrikaans Language), generally known as the WAT, is the largest descriptive Afrikaans dictionary. As comprehensive descriptive dictionary, it strives to reflect the Afrikaans language in its entirety. Not only standard Afrikaans is portrayed, but also varieties like Kaaps and Namakwalands.

As of 2021, sixteen volumes have been published, with the sixteenth volume containing part of the letter S. The WAT is also available as a CD and on the internet. The Handwoordeboek van die Afrikaanse Taal (HAT) is a shorter, concise Afrikaans explanatory dictionary in a single volume, compared to the comprehensive Woordeboek van die Afrikaanse Taal (WAT), similar to the Concise Oxford Dictionary and the Oxford English Dictionary.

The project was begun in 1926 by Prof. J. J. Smith of Stellenbosch University. In the early years, phrases and citations contributed by language speakers via surface mail were compiled into 4.5 million handwritten or typed cards. The first volume of the WAT was published in 1951.
