= Cape Town Gardens (House of Assembly of South Africa constituency) =

- Kaapstad-Tuine
- Former constituency for the South African House of Assembly
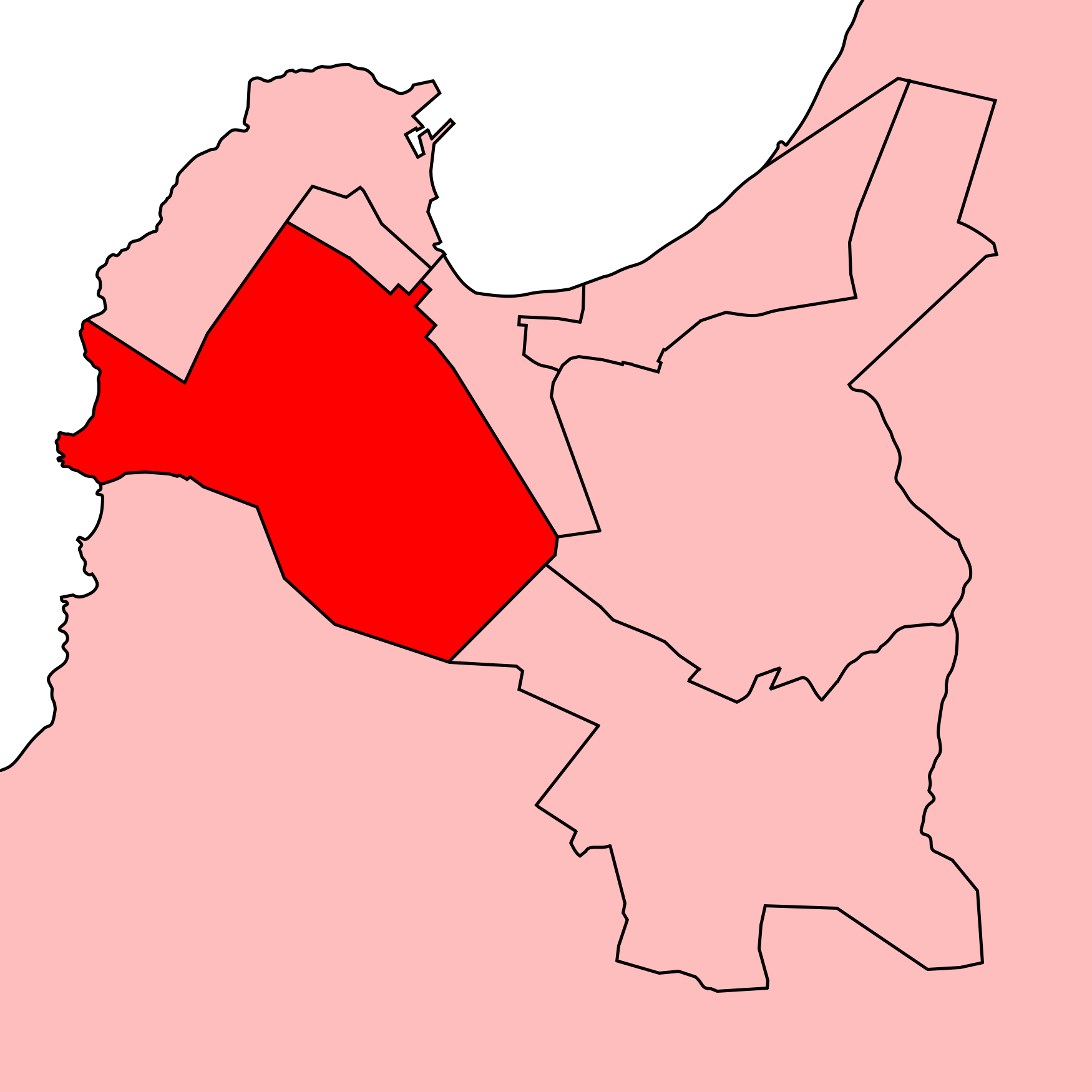
- Location of Cape Town Gardens within Cape Town (1910)
- Province: Cape of Good Hope
- Electorate: 16,522 (1989)

Former constituency
- Created: 1910
- Abolished: 1994
- Number of members: 1
- Last MHA: Ken Andrew (DP)
- Replaced by: Western Cape

Cape Town Gardens (Afrikaans: Kaapstad-Tuine) was a constituency in the Cape Province of South Africa, which existed from 1910 to 1994. Named after the suburb of Gardens, and by extension the Company's Garden, it covered the southern parts of the City Bowl of Cape Town. Throughout its existence it elected one member to the House of Assembly and one to the Cape Provincial Council.

== Franchise notes ==
When the Union of South Africa was formed in 1910, the electoral qualifications in use in each pre-existing colony were kept in place. The Cape Colony had implemented a "colour-blind" franchise known as the Cape Qualified Franchise, which included all adult literate men owning more than £75 worth of property (controversially raised from £25 in 1892), and this initially remained in effect after the colony became the Cape Province. As of 1908, 22,784 out of 152,221 electors in the Cape Colony were "Native or Coloured". Eligibility to serve in Parliament and the Provincial Council, however, was restricted to whites from 1910 onward.

The first challenge to the Cape Qualified Franchise came with the Women's Enfranchisement Act, 1930 and the Franchise Laws Amendment Act, 1931, which extended the vote to women and removed property qualifications for the white population only – non-white voters remained subject to the earlier restrictions. In 1936, the Representation of Natives Act removed all black voters from the common electoral roll and introduced three "Native Representative Members", white MPs elected by the black voters of the province and meant to represent their interests in particular. A similar provision was made for Coloured voters with the Separate Representation of Voters Act, 1951, and although this law was challenged by the courts, it went into effect in time for the 1958 general election, which was thus held with all-white voter rolls for the first time in South African history. The all-white franchise would continue until the end of apartheid and the introduction of universal suffrage in 1994.

== History ==
Cape Town Gardens was one of the four constituencies created out of the multi-member Cape Town seat for the Cape Parliament. At the time, it covered the entire City Bowl south of Leeuwen Street and Roeland Street, as well as the seaside suburb of Clifton. The latter was moved into the Sea Point seat in 1924, and from that point until its abolition, the constituency saw only minor changes. While the other three seats with the Cape Town prefix were all abolished between 1924 and 1958, Gardens lasted all the way until the end of first-past-the-post elections in 1994.

Like the rest of Cape Town, it was a largely English-speaking seat and loyal to the pro-British side of South African politics. However, its initial Unionist MP, William Duncan Baxter (former Cape Town mayor and son-in-law of Cape Town Central MP John William Jagger), would only hold the seat until 1920, when the Labour candidate R. Forsyth took it as part of that party's wave (Labour also took Salt River and Woodstock in the same year). The following year, South African Party candidate George William Hawley took the seat, but held it for only a few months, with Forsyth taking it back in a by-election later that year. The SAP narrowly won it back in 1924, and narrowly defended it in 1929 despite the Labour candidate being the former Cape Town Castle MP Morris Alexander. C. W. A. Coulter, now the seat's MP, objected to the SAP's merger into the United Party in 1934 and joined the Dominion Party, but was thoroughly defeated by the UP candidate in the 1938 general election. From 1948 to 1958 the seat was represented by Abraham Jonker, who left the UP in 1953 and founded the National Conservative Party, later joining the governing National Party on the NCP's collapse. That was the last time a party other than the main liberal opposition held Gardens, with its last MP being the Democratic Party's federal chairman, Ken Andrew.

== Members ==
Election	Member	Party
1910	William Duncan Baxter	Unionist
1915	William Duncan Baxter	Unionist
1920	Robert Forsyth	Labour
1921	George William Hawley	South African
1921 by	Robert Forsyth	Labour
1924	C. W. A. Coulter	South African
1929	C. W. A. Coulter	South African
1933	C. W. A. Coulter	South African
1934	C. W. A. Coulter	Dominion
1938	Basil Long	United
1943	L. P. Bosman	United
1948	Abraham Jonker	United
1948	Abraham Jonker	United
1953	Abraham Jonker	United
1954	Abraham Jonker	NCP
1957	Abraham Jonker	National
1958	J. M. Connan	United
1961	J. M. Connan	United
1966	J. M. Connan	United
1970	H. A. van Hoogstraaten	United
1974	H. A. van Hoogstraaten	United
1977	Ken Andrew	PFP
1981	Ken Andrew	PFP
1987	Ken Andrew	PFP
1989	Ken Andrew	Democratic
1994	constituency abolished	

== Detailed results ==
=== Elections in the 1910s ===
General election 1910: Cape Town Gardens
Party	Candidate	Votes	%	±%
Unionist	William Duncan Baxter	1,269	60.4	New
Independent	H. Liberman	831	39.6	New
Majority		438	20.8	N/A
Unionist win (new seat)				

General election 1915: Cape Town Gardens
Party	Candidate	Votes	%	±%
Unionist	William Duncan Baxter	1,700	68.7	+8.3
Labour	Robert Forsyth	773	31.3	New
Majority		927	37.4	N/A
Turnout		2,473	60.5	N/A
Unionist hold		Swing	N/A	

=== Elections in the 1920s ===
General election 1920: Cape Town Gardens
Party	Candidate	Votes	%	±%
Labour	Robert Forsyth	1,365	55.7	+18.3
Unionist	William Duncan Baxter	1,087	44.3	−18.3
Majority		278	11.4	N/A
Turnout		2,452	58.3	−2.2
Labour gain from Unionist		Swing	+18.3	

General election 1921: Cape Town Gardens
Party	Candidate	Votes	%	±%
South African	George William Hawley	1,935	68.4	New
Labour	Robert Forsyth	896	31.6	−24.1
Majority		1,039	36.8	N/A
Turnout		2,831	65.6	+7.3
South African gain from Labour		Swing	N/A	

Cape Town Gardens by-election, 8 September 1921
Party	Candidate	Votes	%	±%
Labour	Robert Forsyth	1,604	50.0	+18.4
South African	E. B. Fuller	1,550	48.3	−20.1
Rejected ballots		52	1.7	N/A
Majority		54	1.8	N/A
Turnout		3,206	71.8	+6.2
Labour gain from South African		Swing	+19.3	

General election 1924: Cape Town Gardens
Party	Candidate	Votes	%	±%
South African	C. W. A. Coulter	1,781	51.1	−17.3
Labour	Robert Forsyth	1,658	47.5	+15.9
Rejected ballots		49	1.4	N/A
Majority		123	3.6	−33.2
Turnout		3,488	75.6	+10.0
South African hold		Swing	-16.6	

General election 1929: Cape Town Gardens
Party	Candidate	Votes	%	±%
South African	C. W. A. Coulter	1,726	51.7	+0.6
Labour (Creswell)	Morris Alexander	1,582	47.4	−0.1
Rejected ballots		32	0.9	-0.5
Majority		144	4.3	+0.7
Turnout		3,340	82.9	+7.3
South African hold		Swing	+0.4	

=== Elections in the 1930s ===
General election 1933: Cape Town Gardens
Party	Candidate	Votes	%	±%
South African	C. W. A. Coulter	Unopposed		
South African hold				

General election 1938: Cape Town Gardens
Party	Candidate	Votes	%	±%
United	B. K. Long	4,398	75.4	New
Dominion	C. W. A. Coulter	1,352	23.2	N/A
Rejected ballots		81	1.4	N/A
Majority		3,046	52.2	N/A
Turnout		5,831	70.5	N/A
United gain from Dominion		Swing	N/A	

=== Elections in the 1940s ===
General election 1943: Cape Town Gardens
Party	Candidate	Votes	%	±%
United	L. P. Bosman	5,646	82.4	+5.9
Reunited National	H. H. Broodryk	1,207	17.6	New
Majority		4,439	64.8	N/A
Turnout		6,853	66.1	−4.4
United hold		Swing	N/A	

Cape Town Gardens by-election, 18 February 1948
Party	Candidate	Votes	%	±%
United	Abraham Jonker	Unopposed		
United hold				
