= Germiston (House of Assembly of South Africa constituency) =

Former constituency in the Transvaal Province of South Africa

- Former constituency for the South African House of Assembly
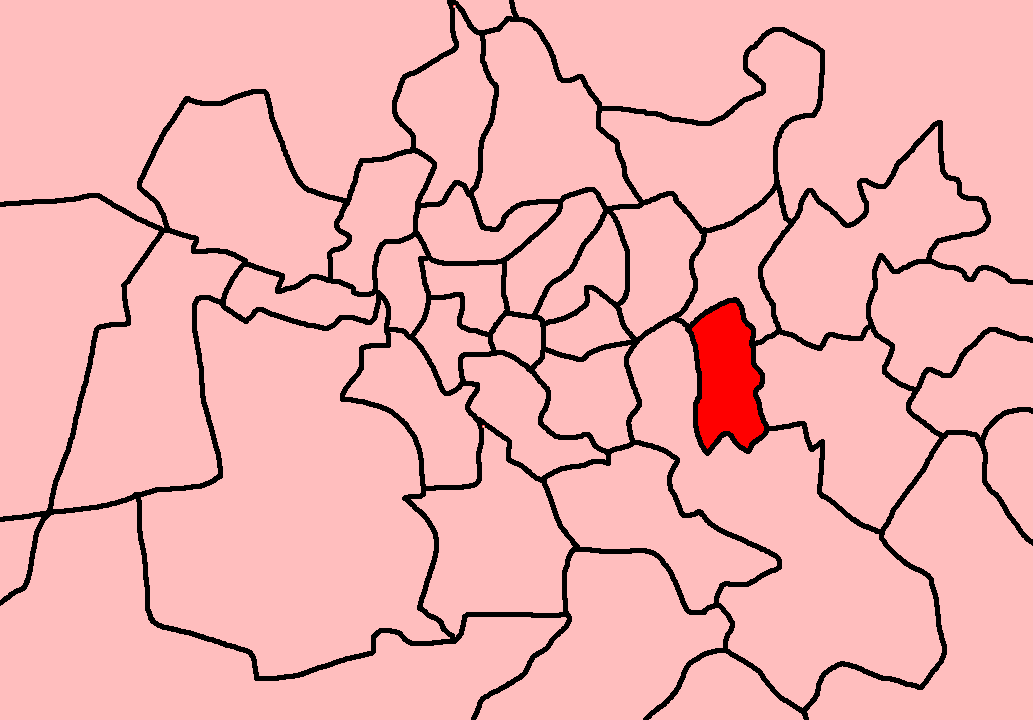
- Location of Germiston within the Witwatersrand (1981)
- Province: Transvaal
- Electorate: 20,452 (1989)

Former constituency
- Created: 1910; 1943
- Abolished: 1938; 1994
- Number of members: 1
- Last MHA: Derek Christophers (NP)
- Created from: Germiston North; Germiston South (1943)
- Replaced by: Germiston North; Germiston South (1938); Gauteng (1994)

Germiston was a constituency in the Transvaal Province of South Africa, which existed from 1910 to 1994 with the exception of the 1938 general election. It covered a part of the East Rand centred on the town of Germiston. Throughout its existence it elected one member to the House of Assembly and one to the Transvaal Provincial Council.

== Franchise notes ==
When the Union of South Africa was formed in 1910, the electoral qualifications in use in each pre-existing colony were kept in place. In the Transvaal Colony, and its predecessor the South African Republic, the vote was restricted to white men, and as such, elections in the Transvaal Province were held on a whites-only franchise from the beginning. The franchise was also restricted by property and education qualifications until the 1933 general election, following the passage of the Women's Enfranchisement Act, 1930 and the Franchise Laws Amendment Act, 1931. From then on, the franchise was given to all white citizens aged 21 or over. Non-whites remained disenfranchised until the end of apartheid and the introduction of universal suffrage in 1994.

== History ==
The mines of the Witwatersrand were an early stronghold of South African trade unionism, and this made Germiston fertile ground for the Labour Party. While less safe than seats like Benoni or Jeppes, the party held Germiston during its nationwide peaks in 1920 and 1924-29. Germiston's Labour MP, George Brown, died in office in 1932, and the resulting by-election was won by a young J. G. N. Strauss, later leader of the opposition. In 1938, Germiston was split into a North and a South seat, which were rearranged after just one five-year term into a town and a district seat - Strauss chose to represent Germiston District, and Germiston reverted to Labour for one term before falling to the Herenigde Nasionale Party in 1948.

In its second iteration, Germiston was a safe seat for the governing National Party. Its longest-serving MP, Willem Adriaan Cruywagen, was a cabinet minister under Verwoerd and Vorster, and was later appointed Administrator of the Transvaal.

== Members ==
Election	Member	Party
1910	Francis Drummond Percy Chaplin	Unionist
1915	Dewdney William Drew	Unionist
1920	George Brown	Labour
1921	Hugh Steward McAlister	South African
1924	George Brown	Labour
1929	George Brown	Labour
1932 by	Jacobus Gideon Nel Strauss	South African
1933	Jacobus Gideon Nel Strauss	South African
1934	Jacobus Gideon Nel Strauss	United
1938	Constituency abolished	

Election	Member	Party
1943	A. C. Payne	Labour
1948	Johannes du Pisanie	HNP
1953	Johannes du Pisanie	National
1958	Johannes du Pisanie	National
1961	Willem Adriaan Cruywagen	National
1966	Willem Adriaan Cruywagen	National
1970	Willem Adriaan Cruywagen	National
1974	Willem Adriaan Cruywagen	National
1977	Willem Adriaan Cruywagen	National
1979 by	D. S. van Eeden	National
1981	D. S. van Eeden	National
1987	Derek Christophers	National
1989	Derek Christophers	National
1994	Constituency abolished	

== Detailed results ==
=== Elections in the 1910s ===
General election 1910: Germiston
Party	Candidate	Votes	%	±%
Unionist	Francis Drummond Percy Chaplin	1,114	57.7	New
Labour	J. Coward	816	42.3	New
Majority		298	15.4	N/A
Unionist win (new seat)				

General election 1915: Germiston
Party	Candidate	Votes	%	±%
Unionist	D. F. Drew	905	55.7	−2.0
Labour	P. F. Smith	719	44.3	+2.0
Majority		186	11.4	−4.0
Turnout		1,624	69.0	N/A
Unionist hold		Swing	-2.0	

=== Elections in the 1920s ===
General election 1920: Germiston
Party	Candidate	Votes	%	±%
Labour	George Brown	880	37.0	−7.3
National	H. H. Moll	844	35.5	New
Unionist	H. S. McAlister	652	27.4	−28.3
Majority		36	1.5	N/A
Turnout		2,376	69.7	+0.7
Labour gain from Unionist		Swing	+10.5	

General election 1921: Germiston
Party	Candidate	Votes	%	±%
South African	Hugh Steward McAlister	1,039	39.6	+12.2
National	Henry Harris Moll	996	37.9	+2.4
Labour	George Brown	592	22.5	−14.5
Majority		43	1.7	N/A
Turnout		2,627	71.1	+1.4
South African gain from Labour		Swing	N/A	

General election 1924: Germiston
Party	Candidate	Votes	%	±%
Labour	George Brown	1,317	58.0	+35.5
South African	H. S. McAlister	941	41.4	+1.8
Rejected ballots		13	0.6	N/A
Majority		376	16.6	N/A
Turnout		2,627	71.1	+1.4
Labour gain from South African		Swing	+16.9	

General election 1929: Germiston
Party	Candidate	Votes	%	±%
Labour (Creswell)	George Brown	1,618	68.0	+10.0
Labour (N.C.)	J. Allen	741	31.2	New
Rejected ballots		19	0.8	+0.2
Majority		877	36.8	N/A
Turnout		2,378	76.0	+4.9
Labour hold		Swing	N/A	

=== Elections in the 1930s ===
Germiston by-election, 30 November 1932
Party	Candidate	Votes	%	±%
South African	Jacobus Gideon Nel Strauss	4,257	68.0	New
National	H. J. Schlosberg	3,076	40.5	New
Labour	W. J. Dalrymple	132	1.7	−66.3
Independent	F. P. Steinhobel	51	0.7	New
Independent	M. C. Hill	33	0.4	New
Rejected ballots		52	0.7	-0.1
Majority		1,181	15.5	N/A
Turnout		7,601	90.0	+14.0
South African gain from Labour		Swing	N/A	

General election 1933: Germiston
Party	Candidate	Votes	%	±%
South African	J. G. N. Strauss	Unopposed		
South African gain from Labour				
