= List of administrators of former South African provinces =

Map of the provinces of South Africa, 1910–1976.

Map of the provinces of South Africa, 1976–1994.

This article lists the administrators of former South African provinces. It includes officials who headed various provinces in the period from 1910 to 1994, when South Africa was administratively divided into four provinces:

- Province of the Cape of Good Hope (Afrikaans: Provinsie Kaap die Goeie Hoop), with its seat in Cape Town
- Province of Natal (Afrikaans: Natalprovinsie), with its seat in Pietermaritzburg
- Province of the Orange Free State (Afrikaans: Provinsie Oranje-Vrystaat), with its seat in Bloemfontein
- Province of the Transvaal (Afrikaans: Provinsie van Transvaal), with its seat in Pretoria

The provinces were created in 1910 as successors of four previous British colonies in the same territory: Cape Colony (1806–1910), Colony of Natal (1843–1910), Orange River Colony (1902–10) and Transvaal Colony (1902–10). These four provinces were established as a result of the creation of the Union of South Africa in 1910. They survived the subsequent creation of the Republic of South Africa in 1961, and were abolished in 1994, in the wake of the first post-apartheid general election in April 1994.

== Cape Province ==
Map of the Cape Province (red) within South Africa.

No.	Portrait	Name (Birth–Death)	Term of office		
No.	Portrait	Name (Birth–Death)	Took office	Left office	Time in office
1		Nicolaas Frederic de Waal (1853–1932) (Note: From 2 January 1911, Sir Frederic de Waal.)	31 May 1910	December 1925	15 years, 6 months
2		Adriaan Paulus Johannes Fourie (1882–1941)	January 1926	August 1929	3 years, 7 months
3		Johannes Hendrik Conradie (1872–1940)	September 1929	September 1939	10 years
4		François Allan Joubert (1889–1942)	September 1939	September 1942	3 years
5		Gideon Brand van Zyl (1873–1956) (Note: Afterwards served as the Governor-General of South Africa, from 1946 to 1951.)	2 October 1942	31 December 1945	3 years, 90 days
6		Philippus Arnoldus Myburgh (1880–1946) (Note: Previously served as the President of the Senate, from 1942 to 1945.)	1 January 1946	1 July 1946	181 days
7		Johan Carinus (1892–1960)	23 July 1946	22 July 1951	4 years, 364 days
8		Philippus Jacobus Olivier (1901–1958)	1 August 1951	27 March 1958	6 years, 238 days
9		Josias Hendrik Otto du Plessis (1907–1960)	12 May 1958	28 April 1960	1 year, 352 days
10		Johannes Nicholas Malan (1903–1981)	28 April 1960	1 June 1960	34 days
10		Johannes Nicholas Malan (1903–1981)	1 June 1960	31 May 1970	9 years, 364 days
11		Andries Heydenrich Vosloo (1912–1982)	1 June 1970	May 1975	4 years, 11 months
12		Lourens Albertus Petrus Anderson Munnik (1925–2016)	June 1975	June 1979	4 years
13		Eugene "Gene" van der Merwe Louw (1931–2015) (Note: Afterwards served as the Speaker of the House of Assembly, from 1991 to 1994.)	June 1979	July 1989	10 years, 1 month
14		Jacobus "Kobus" Meiring (born 1936)	July 1989	May 1994	4 years, 10 months

== Natal Province ==
Map of the Natal Province (red) within South Africa.

No.	Portrait	Name (Birth–Death)	Term of office		
No.	Portrait	Name (Birth–Death)	Took office	Left office	Time in office
1		Charles John Smythe (1852–1918)	May 1910	January 1918	7 years, 8 months
2		George Thomas Plowman (1858–1943)	February 1918	January 1928	9 years, 11 months
3		Herbert Gordon Watson (1874–1948)	February 1928	January 1943	14 years, 11 months
4		George Heaton Nicholls (1876–1959)	February 1943	November 1944	1 year, 9 months
5		Douglas Edgar Mitchell (1896–1988)	November 1944	February 1948	3 years, 3 months
6		Denis Gem Shepstone (1888–1966)	February 1948	May 1958	10 years, 3 months
7		Alfred Ernest Trollip (1895–1972)	June 1958	November 1961	3 years, 5 months
8		Theodor Johannes Adolph Gerdener (1916–2013)	November 1961	August 1970	8 years, 9 months
9		Wynand Wilhelm Benjamin Havemann (1912–1986)	August 1970	June 1979	8 years, 10 months
–		Frank Martin (died 1987); Acting	June 1979	August 1979	2 months
10		Jan Christoffel "Stoffel" Greyling Botha (1929–1998)	August 1979	September 1984	5 years, 1 month
–		Frank Martin (died 1987); Acting	September 1984	November 1984	2 months
11		Radclyffe Cadman (1924–2011) (Note: Previously served as the Leader of the Opposition, in 1977.)	November 1984	April 1990	5 years, 5 months
12		Cornelius Johannes van Rooyen Botha (1932–2014)	April 1990	7 May 1994	4 years, 1 month

== Orange Free State Province ==
Map of the Orange Free State Province (red) within South Africa.

No.	Portrait	Name (Birth–Death)	Term of office		
No.	Portrait	Name (Birth–Death)	Took office	Left office	Time in office
1		Alfred Ernest William Ramsbottom (1860–1922)	May 1910	May 1915	5 years
2		Cornelius Hermanus Wessels (1851–1924) (Note: From 4 March 1920, Sir Cornelius Hermanus Wessels.)	May 1915	2 March 1924	8 years, 10 months
3		Esaias Reinier Grobler (1861–1937)	11 March 1924	March 1929	4 years, 11 months
4		Carl Theodorus Muller Wilcocks (1861–1936)	March 1929	11 November 1936	7 years, 7 months
–		Johannes Buys (1859–1943); Acting	November 1936	December 1936	1 month
5		Johannes Frederik Janse van Rensburg (1898–1966)	December 1936	December 1940	4 years
6		Stephanus Philippus Barnard (1888–1951)	December 1940	December 1950	10 years
7		Jacobus "Jim" Johannes Fouché (1898–1980) (Note: Afterwards served as the State President of South Africa, from 1968 to 1975.)	1 January 1951	December 1959	8 years, 11 months
8		Johannes Willem “Sand” Jacobus Coetzee du Plessis (1908–1994)	December 1959	December 1969	10 years
9		Gabriel François van Lingen Froneman (1909–1981)	December 1969	13 December 1974	5 years
10		Abraham Cornelis van Wyk (1911–?)	14 December 1974	1979	5 years
11		Cornelius "Nak" van der Merwe (1920–1985)	1979	1980	1 year
12		Louis Johannes Botha (1939–1999)	November 1980	August 1991	10 years, 9 months
13		Louis van der Watt (born 1937)	August 1991	7 May 1994	2 years, 9 months

== Transvaal Province ==
Map of the Transvaal Province (red) within South Africa.

No.	Portrait	Name (Birth–Death)	Term of office		
No.	Portrait	Name (Birth–Death)	Took office	Left office	Time in office
1		Johann Friedrich Bernhard Rissik (1857–1925)	31 May 1910	23 July 1917	7 years, 53 days
2		Alfred George Robertson (1867–1929)	24 July 1917	29 February 1924	6 years, 220 days
3		Jan Hendrik Hofmeyr (1894–1948)	1 March 1924	28 February 1929	4 years, 364 days
4		Jacobus Stephanus Smit (1878–1960)	1 March 1929	28 February 1934	4 years, 364 days
5		Simon Potgieter Bekker (1882–1938)	1 March 1934	29 July 1938	4 years, 150 days
Vacant (29 July – 1 September 1938)
6		Jacobus Johannes Pienaar (1866–1950)	1 September 1938	31 August 1948	9 years, 365 days
Vacant (31 August – 1 November 1948)
7		William Nicol (1887–1967)	1 November 1948	31 October 1958	9 years, 364 days
8		Frans Hendrik Odendaal (1898–1966)	1 November 1958	8 February 1966	7 years, 99 days
9		Sybrand Gerhardus Johannes van Niekerk (1914–2011)	12 February 1966	15 July 1979	13 years, 153 days
10		Willem Adriaan Cruywagen (1921–2013)	16 July 1979	31 May 1988	8 years, 320 days
11		Danie Hough (1937–2008) (Note: Previously served as the Administrator-General of South West Africa, from 1980 to 1983.)	1 June 1988	7 May 1994	5 years, 340 days

== See also ==
- Administrative divisions of South Africa
- Provinces of South Africa
- Premier (South Africa), lists current premier in each of the 9 provinces
