= Woodstock (House of Assembly of South Africa constituency) =

- Former constituency for the South African House of Assembly
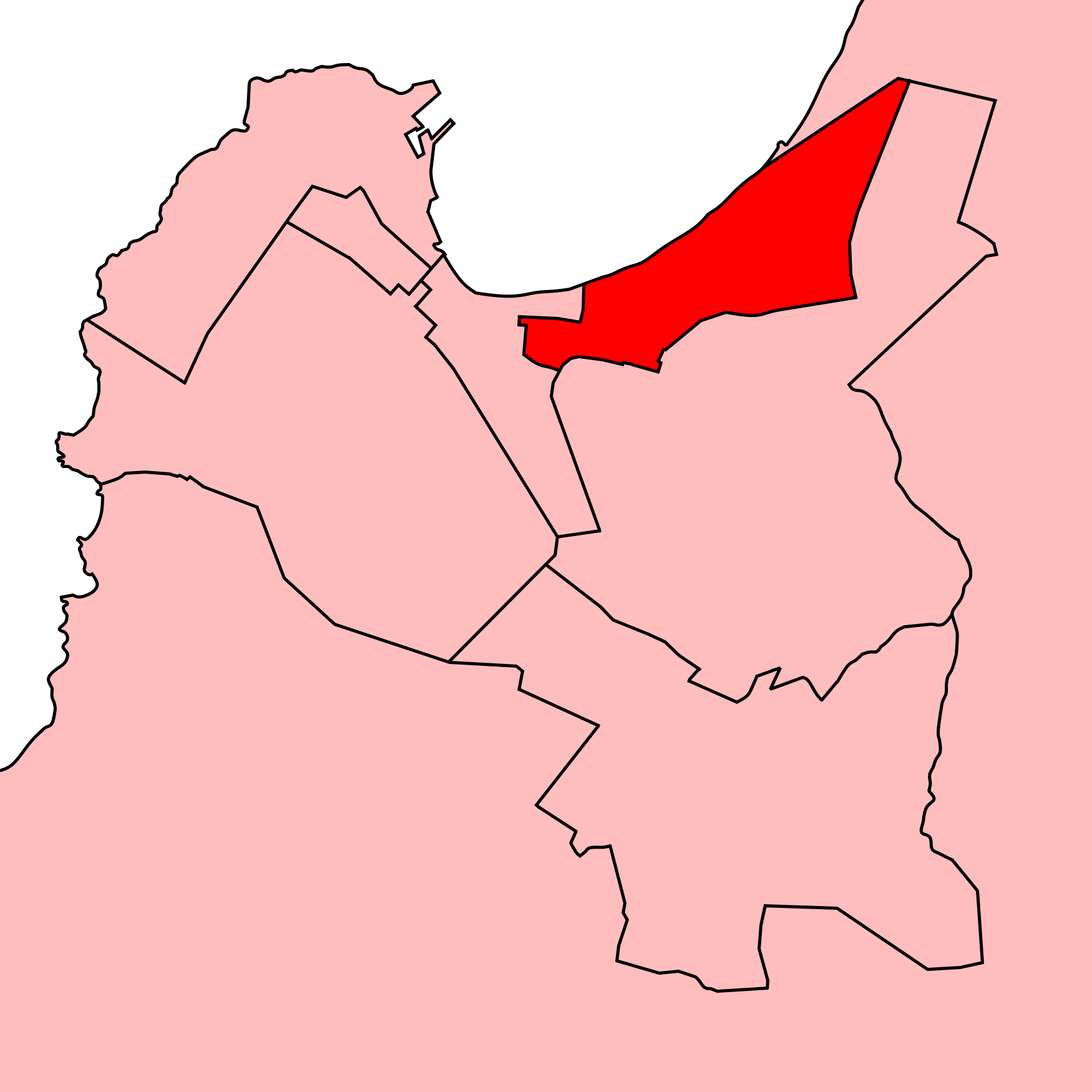
- Location of Woodstock within Cape Town (1910)
- Province: Cape of Good Hope
- Electorate: 9,970 (1943)

Former constituency
- Created: 1910
- Abolished: 1953
- Number of members: 1
- Last MHA: J. Hamilton Russell (UP)
- Replaced by: Cape Town Castle

Woodstock was a constituency in the Cape Province of South Africa, which existed from 1910 to 1924 and again from 1929 to 1953. It covered various areas of Cape Town’s inner suburbs, centred on its namesake suburb of Woodstock. Throughout its existence it elected one member to the House of Assembly and one to the Cape Provincial Council.

== Franchise notes ==
When the Union of South Africa was formed in 1910, the electoral qualifications in use in each pre-existing colony were kept in place. The Cape Colony had implemented a “colour-blind” franchise known as the Cape Qualified Franchise, which included all adult literate men owning more than £75 worth of property (controversially raised from £25 in 1892), and this initially remained in effect after the colony became the Cape Province. As of 1908, 22,784 out of 152,221 electors in the Cape Colony were “Native or Coloured”. Eligibility to serve in Parliament and the Provincial Council, however, was restricted to whites from 1910 onward.

The first challenge to the Cape Qualified Franchise came with the Women's Enfranchisement Act, 1930 and the Franchise Laws Amendment Act, 1931, which extended the vote to women and removed property qualifications for the white population only – non-white voters remained subject to the earlier restrictions. In 1936, the Representation of Natives Act removed all black voters from the common electoral roll and introduced three “Native Representative Members”, white MPs elected by the black voters of the province and meant to represent their interests in particular. A similar provision was made for Coloured voters with the Separate Representation of Voters Act, 1951, and although this law was challenged by the courts, it went into effect in time for the 1958 general election, which was thus held with all-white voter rolls for the first time in South African history. The all-white franchise would continue until the end of apartheid and the introduction of universal suffrage in 1994.

== History ==
Throughout its existence, Woodstock was a compact, urbanised and largely working-class constituency. In its early days, it was a marginal seat between the Unionist Party and Labour, the latter of which briefly held the seat in 1920 and 1921 – however, Labour MP Isaac Purcell switched allegiance to the South African Party (for which he had previously contested the seat in 1915) ahead of the 1921 general election, and was re-elected. In 1924, the constituency was briefly abolished, its territory divided between Cape Town-Hanover Street and Salt River, but in 1929 it returned. In its second iteration, Woodstock became a safe seat for the United Party, which faced only Communist opposition in 1943 and an independent candidate in 1948. In 1953, the seat was abolished, with most of its voters transferred to neighbouring Cape Town Castle.

== Members ==
Election	Member	Party
1910	John Hewat	Unionist
1915	John Hewat	Unionist
1920	Isaac Purcell	Labour
1921	Isaac Purcell	South African
1924	constituency abolished	

Election	Member	Party
1929	Eli Buirski	South African
1932 by	Morris Alexander	South African
1933	A. J. McCallum	South African
1934	A. J. McCallum	United
1938	Harry Lawrence	United
1943	J. H. Russell	United
1948	J. H. Russell	United
1953	constituency abolished	

== Detailed results ==
=== Elections in the 1910s ===
General election 1910: Woodstock
Party	Candidate	Votes	%	±%
Unionist	John Hewat	951	50.6	New
Labour	Thomas Maginess	926	49.4	New
Majority		25	1.2	N/A
Unionist win (new seat)				

General election 1915: Woodstock
Party	Candidate	Votes	%	±%
Unionist	John Hewat	1,119	35.3	−15.3
South African	Isaac Purcell	903	28.5	New
Labour	W. Freestone	587	18.5	−30.9
Independent	J. W. Mushet	486	15.3	New
Unionist	W. D. Hare	75	2.4	New
Majority		216	6.8	N/A
Turnout		3,170	60.4	N/A
Unionist hold		Swing	N/A	

=== Elections in the 1920s ===
General election 1920: Woodstock
Party	Candidate	Votes	%	±%
Labour	Isaac Purcell	1,313	53.9	+35.4
Unionist	John Hewat	626	25.7	−9.6
South African	A. J. McCallum	475	19.5	−9.0
Independent	J. S. Hutchinson	22	0.9	New
Majority		687	28.2	N/A
Turnout		2,436	57.6	−2.8
Labour gain from Unionist		Swing	+22.5	

General election 1921: Woodstock
Party	Candidate	Votes	%	±%
South African	Isaac Purcell	1,124	55.9	+36.4
Labour	J. Frank	887	44.1	−9.8
Majority		237	11.8	N/A
Turnout		2,011	46.3	−11.9
South African gain from Labour		Swing	+23.1	

General election 1929: Woodstock
Party	Candidate	Votes	%	±%
South African	Eli Buirski	1,692	59.3	New
Labour (Creswell)	W. Freestone	1,100	38.6	New
Labour (N.C.)	A. G. Forsyth	30	1.1	New
Rejected ballots		31	1.0	N/A
Majority		592	20.7	N/A
Turnout		2,853	72.6	N/A
South African win (new seat)				

=== Elections in the 1930s ===
Woodstock by-election, 5 January 1932
Party	Candidate	Votes	%	±%
South African	Morris Alexander	Unopposed		
South African hold				

General election 1933: Woodstock
Party	Candidate	Votes	%	±%
South African	A. J. MacCallum	2,112	70.1	+10.8
Labour (N.C.)	D. McWilliams	849	28.2	+27.1
Rejected ballots		50	1.7	+0.7
Majority		1,263	41.9	N/A
Turnout		3,011	56.7	−15.9
South African hold		Swing	-8.2	

General election 1938: Woodstock
Party	Candidate	Votes	%	±%
United	Harry Lawrence	3,064	55.7	−14.4
Labour	R. Forsyth	2,383	43.3	+15.1
Rejected ballots		54	1.0	-0.7
Majority		681	12.4	−29.5
Turnout		5,501	67.9	+11.2
United hold		Swing	-14.8	

=== Elections in the 1940s ===
General election 1943: Woodstock
Party	Candidate	Votes	%	±%
United	J. H. Russell	5,392	74.8	+18.5
South African Communist Party	H. Snitcher	1,818	25.2	New
Majority		3,574	49.6	N/A
Turnout		7,210	71.1	+3.2
United hold		Swing	N/A	
