= Germiston South (House of Assembly of South Africa constituency) =

- Germiston-Suid
- Former constituency for the South African House of Assembly
- Province: Transvaal
- Electorate: 7,984 (1938)

Former constituency
- Created: 1938
- Abolished: 1943
- Number of members: 1
- Last MHA: J. G. N. Strauss (UP)
- Created from: Germiston
- Replaced by: Germiston; Germiston District

Germiston South (Afrikaans: Germiston-Suid) was a short-lived constituency in the Transvaal Province of South Africa, which existed only for the 1938 general election. It covered a part of the East Rand centred on the southern part of Germiston. It elected one member to the House of Assembly and one to the Transvaal Provincial Council.

== Franchise notes ==
When the Union of South Africa was formed in 1910, the electoral qualifications in use in each pre-existing colony were kept in place. In the Transvaal Colony, and its predecessor the South African Republic, the vote was restricted to white men, and as such, elections in the Transvaal Province were held on a whites-only franchise from the beginning. The franchise was also restricted by property and education qualifications until the 1933 general election, following the passage of the Women's Enfranchisement Act, 1930 and the Franchise Laws Amendment Act, 1931. From then on, the franchise was given to all white citizens aged 21 or over. Non-whites remained disenfranchised until the end of apartheid and the introduction of universal suffrage in 1994.

== History ==
Germiston North was only contested once, in 1938, when it was held by the United Party's J. G. N. Strauss over a divided field. In 1943, Germiston was reconfigured into a "town" and a District seat, and Strauss stood for and won election in Germiston District.

== Members ==
Election	Member	Party
1938	J. G. N. Strauss	United
1943	Constituency abolished	

== Detailed results ==
=== Elections in the 1930s ===
General election 1938: Germiston South
Party	Candidate	Votes	%	±%
United	J. G. N. Strauss	3,705	58.1	New
Purified National	J. H. Boneschans	1,823	28.6	New
Labour	W. T. Lever	790	12.4	New
Rejected ballots		57	0.9	N/A
Majority		1,882	29.5	N/A
Turnout		6,375	79.8	N/A
United win (new seat)				
