= Germiston North (House of Assembly of South Africa constituency) =

- Germiston-Noord
- Former constituency for the South African House of Assembly
- Province: Transvaal
- Electorate: 8,440 (1938)

Former constituency
- Created: 1938
- Abolished: 1943
- Number of members: 1
- Last MHA: S. C. Quinlan (UP)
- Created from: Germiston
- Replaced by: Germiston; Germiston District

Germiston North (Afrikaans: Germiston-Noord) was a short-lived constituency in the Transvaal Province of South Africa, which existed only for the 1938 general election. It covered a part of the East Rand centred on the northern part of Germiston. It elected one member to the House of Assembly and one to the Transvaal Provincial Council.

== Franchise notes ==
When the Union of South Africa was formed in 1910, the electoral qualifications in use in each pre-existing colony were kept in place. In the Transvaal Colony, and its predecessor the South African Republic, the vote was restricted to white men, and as such, elections in the Transvaal Province were held on a whites-only franchise from the beginning. The franchise was also restricted by property and education qualifications until the 1933 general election, following the passage of the Women's Enfranchisement Act, 1930 and the Franchise Laws Amendment Act, 1931. From then on, the franchise was given to all white citizens aged 21 or over. Non-whites remained disenfranchised until the end of apartheid and the introduction of universal suffrage in 1994.

== History ==
Germiston North was only contested once, in 1938, when it was held by the United Party's Sylvester Cornelius Quinlan over a divided field. In 1943, Germiston was reconfigured into a "town" and a District seat, and Quinlan did not stand for re-election.

== Members ==
Election	Member	Party
1938	S. C. Quinlan	United
1943	Constituency abolished	

== Detailed results ==
=== Elections in the 1930s ===
General election 1938: Germiston North
Party	Candidate	Votes	%	±%
United	S. C. Quinlan	2,813	42.5	New
Purified National	H. J. Zwanepoel	1,707	25.8	New
Labour	T. Stark	1,108	16.8	New
Independent	R. Strachan	873	13.2	New
Independent	P. J. J. van V. Zietsman	61	0.9	New
Rejected ballots		52	0.8	N/A
Majority		1,106	16.7	N/A
Turnout		6,614	78.4	N/A
United win (new seat)				
