= David Bloomberg =

Former Mayor of Cape Town between 1973 and 1975

Mayor of Cape Town
- In office 1973–1975
- Preceded by: Richard Friedlander
- Succeeded by: John Tyers

Personal details
- Born: 1932 Sea Point, Cape Town, South Africa
- Died: 26 October 2020
- Parents: Abe Bloomberg (father); Miriam Bloomberg (mother)
- Education: University of Cape Town
- Occupation: Lawyer, politician, author

David Bloomberg (1932 – 26 October 2020) was a former Mayor of Cape Town, lawyer, anti-apartheid campaigner, theatre columnist, theatre director and author.

== Early life ==
Bloomberg was born in the Cape Town suburb of Sea Point in 1932, and educated at Christian Brother's College and the University of Cape Town. His father, Abe Bloomberg, was a leading lawyer, MP, and the Mayor of Cape Town from 1945 to 1947, and his mother, Miriam, was a ballerina and ballet teacher.

== Career ==
Bloomberg joined his father's law firm, Bloomberg, Baigel & Co. where he made his name as a lawyer. He was the defence attorney for Dimitri Tsafendas, who fatally stabbed the Prime Minister, Dr H.F. Verwoerd, in Parliament in 1966. He was also passionate about the Arts and created the Barn Theatre in the garden of his family's home in Constantia. Bloomberg introduced a number of multi-racial plays to Apartheid South Africa, including plays like Porgy and Bess and South Pacific. As a politician, Bloomberg served on the Cape Town City Council for twenty years, and as deputy mayor for two years before his appointment as Mayor of Cape Town from 1973 to 1975. As a director of the Cape Performing Arts Board (CAPAB) he played an important role in establishing the Artscape Theatre Centre, although he fought against its naming in honour of Nico Malan. He was instrumental in privatizing the Cape Town Symphony Orchestra in 1986 and subsequently served as its chair for a number of years. He later joined the Board of Patrons for the Cape Town Philharmonic Orchestra. A one-time theatre columnist for the Cape Times, he published seven books.

== Personal life ==
Bloomberg was a keen tennis player and played doubles in the Western Province Open Tennis Championships. He married the dancer Toby Fine and they had two children together. When she fell ill they moved to London and later Switzerland for her treatment, but she died in London in 2010. He subsequently returned from Lugano to Cape Town. He died from COVID-19 during the COVID-19 pandemic in South Africa, on 26 October 2020. He is buried at the Jewish cemetery in Pinelands.

== Writings ==
- Meet the People (1975)
- My Times (an autobiography, 2007), ISBN 1874950857, 978-1874950851
- Won’t Forgive… Can’t Forget (2006)
- The Chain Gang: Mayors who Served in Cape Town's City Hall (2011)
- Simon's Destiny (2012)
- The Don ... Story of an Actor (2014)
- The Lion and the Thespian (2017)
