= JGN =

JGN may refer to:

- Jacobus Gideon Nel Strauss (1900–1990)
- Jiayuguan Airport, in Gansu Province, China
