= Cruywagen =

Cruywagen is an Afrikaans surname. Notable people with the surname include:

- Riaan Cruywagen (born 1945), South African television news reader and voice artist
- Willem Adriaan Cruywagen (1921–2013), South African politician, academic, and author
