= Douglas Edgar Mitchell =

South African politician

5th Administrator of Natal Province
- In office 1944–1947
- Monarch: George VI
- Prime Minister: Jan Christiaan Smuts
- Preceded by: George Heaton Nicholls
- Succeeded by: Denis Gem Shepstone

Personal details
- Born: 8 September 1896 Colony of Natal
- Died: 1988 (aged 91–92) South Africa
- Citizenship: South African citizenship
- Party: United Party

Douglas Edgar Mitchell (8 September 1896 – 1988) was a South African politician and a prominent member of the United Party in Natal. Nicknamed the "Father of Conservatism in Natal", Mitchell was an influential figure in South African politics, serving as a de facto leader of the Anglo-African community in the province during the post-war era.

Mitchell's political career began in 1933 when he was elected to the Natal Provincial Council. He ran on a platform focused on improving rural infrastructure. Quickly rising through the region's political ranks, in 1939 he would become a Member of the executive committee, overseeing the Financial Affairs department. Harboring a lifelong passion for the conservation of nature, he introduced legislation to develop and protect nature reserves and parks in Natal. Mitchell was appointed as the fifth Administrator of Natal Province in 1944, succeeding his predecessor, Denis Gem Shepstone.

He resigned from his post in 1947 to run in the 1948 South African general election, becoming an MP for the South Coast region. A year later, Mitchell would be elected as the Chairman of the United Party in Natal in 1949, a post he would hold until he resigned in 1972. Representing the United Party's largest regional stronghold, Mitchell became an important figure in South African politics, and championed the anti-republican campaign of the 1960 referendum. Though the referendum passed, Natal overwhelmingly voted against it at 76.22% of the vote. Mitchell adopted an ambivalent stance towards Natal secessionists in the aftermath. While stating that independence would be 'suicide' at the given moment, he expressed intentions to revisit the idea in the future.

He would leave Parliament in 1974, after serving for 26 years. Mitchell died in 1988 at 92 years old.
