= Union Federal Party =

South African political party

The Union Federal Party (Afrikaans: Verenigde Federale Party) was a relatively liberal white South African party that broke away from the United Party after the 1953 election. It never gained any seats in Parliament, and ceased to exist in 1960.

== History ==
The party was initially led by Senator George Heaton Nicholls who was previously the United Party opposition leader in the Senate. It was formed on 10 May 1953. It was founded by members of Torch Commando from Natal. The party was also said to have support from leaders of the Commando in other provinces.

It was a British diaspora party, committed to retaining links with the British Commonwealth and monarchy. The party was centred in Natal, concerned with ensuring the province's autonomy. Federal provincial autonomy was seen as a way preventing Afrikaner nationalism from dominating the political scene and could include ceding from the Union if that occurred or English language rights in the Union were interfered with. It also wished to explore liberalising the non-white franchise. The relatively liberal franchise policy for non-whites included Indians to be enrolled on a communal voters roll similar to the Coloureds in the Cape Province and the possibility of a voters roll for Black South Africans who were highly educated.

The first and major test of the party's electoral appeal was a by-election in the Durban parliamentary constituency of Berea. The party candidate was Col. A.C. Martin, locally popular as a war hero and recent headmaster of Durban High School, but he received only a third of the votes. In the 1954 Natal Provincial Council elections, the party won no seats and only a fifth of the total vote. In the 1958 general election the party did not field any candidates. With Martin as its leader, the party campaigned unsuccessfully for a "No" vote in the 1960 national referendum on whether South Africa should become a republic. After that defeat, the Union Federal Party was dissolved.
