= Abe Bloomberg =

Late South African politician who served as Mayor of Cape Town between 1945 and 1947

Mayor of Cape Town
- In office 1945–1947
- Preceded by: Ernest Nyman
- Succeeded by: Herbert Gearing

Personal details
- Born: Abraham Bloomberg; 14 March 1904 Johannesburg
- Died: 27 July 1990 (aged 86) Cape Town
- Spouse: Miriam Kirsch
- Children: David Bloomberg
- Occupation: Politician, attorney

Abe Bloomberg (14 March 1904 - 27 July 1990) was a South African attorney and politician. He served as Mayor of Cape Town from 1945 to 1947, and was a United Party member for the Cape Town Castle constituency. His tenure as mayor coincided with George VI's royal tour of South Africa with his wife and daughters in 1947. He was a confidant of Jan Smuts and the father of the late David Bloomberg, who also served as mayor of Cape Town from 1973 to 1975. As a lawyer, he was part of the legal team involved in the Coloured vote constitutional crisis. In the Supreme Court of South Africa, he challenged a government decision to remove Cape Coloureds from the voter roll.
