= William Duncan Baxter =

South African politician (1868–1960)

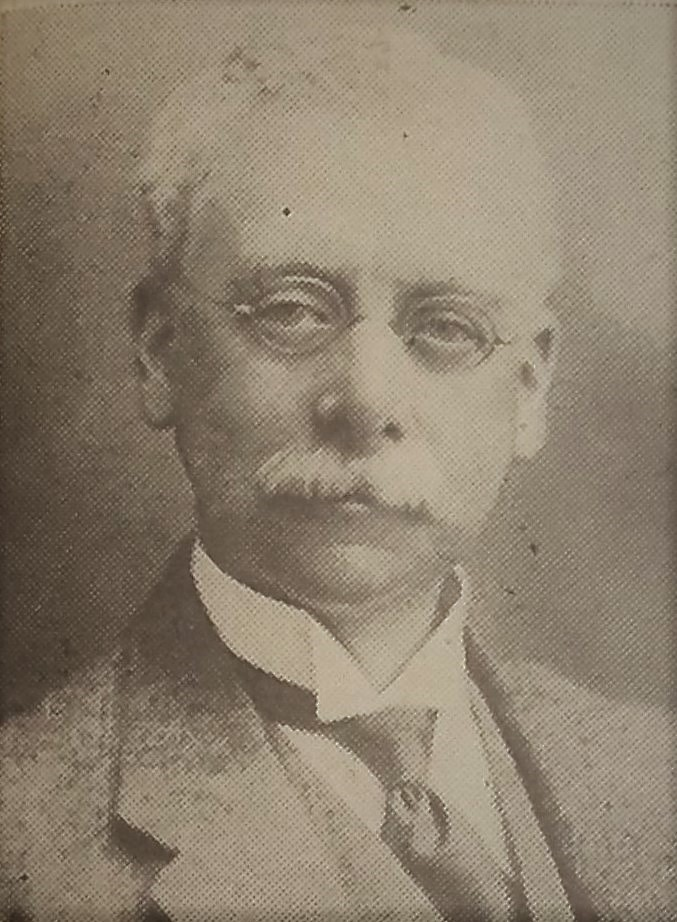

Mayor of Cape Town
- In office 1907–1908
- Preceded by: Hyman Liberman
- Succeeded by: Sir Frank Smith

Personal details
- Born: 14 June 1868 Dundee, Scotland
- Died: 7 January 1960 (aged 91) Cape Town
- Education: High School of Dundee

William Duncan Baxter (14 June 1868 – 7 January 1960) was a businessman, politician, and the Mayor of Cape Town, South Africa, from 1907 to 1908. The theatre, generally known as "The Baxter", a performing arts complex in Rondebosch, a suburb of Cape Town, was named in his honour.

== Early life ==
Baxter was the third son of David William and Jane Baxter, his father being a jute manufacturer. Baxter attended the High School of Dundee in Dundee and the University College. In 1886 he emigrated tCale Colony, where he joined William Duncan and Co. in Cape Town, a drapery business of his uncle. When his uncle died in 1895, he became the owner of the business.

== Public life ==
Baxter showed great interest in political and civic affairs and from 1904 he was a member of the Cape Town City Council and Mayor of Cape Town, from 1907 to 1908. In the organized commerce movement, he served as president of the Cape Town Chamber of Commerce from 1916 to 1918, and again from 1926 to 1928. He was also president of the Association of Chambers of Commerce in South Africa in 1918. From 1908, he was a member of the lower house of the Cape Parliament and from 1910 until 1920, member of the Union House of Assembly, representing the Cape Town Gardens constituency.

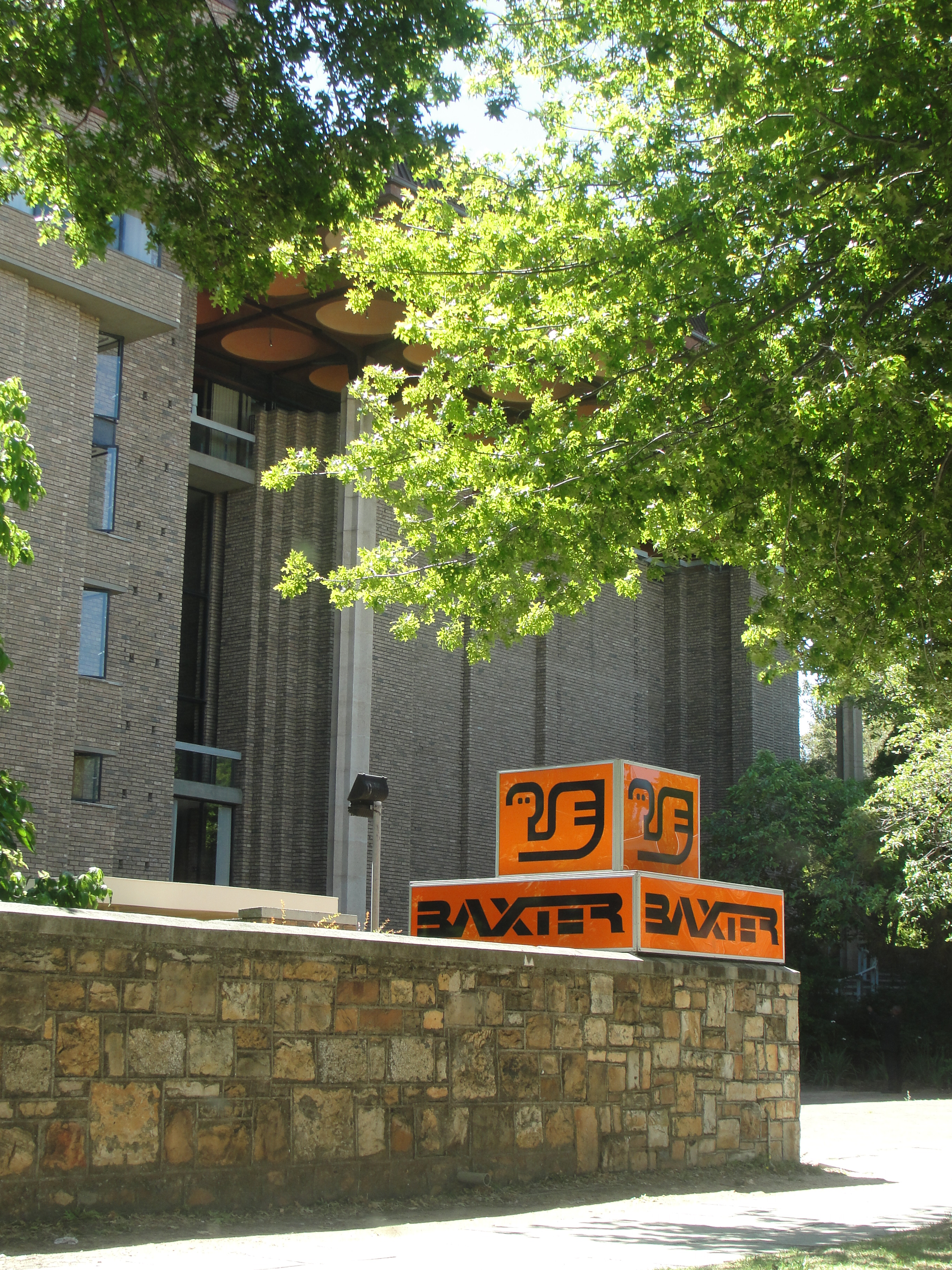
Baxter Theatre

Baxter played a major role in the establishment of the Kirstenbosch National Botanical Garden and was for many years on the governing body and serving as chairman from 1918 until 1957. From 1936 to 1956, he was also president of the Botanical Society of South Africa. In 1921, he was elected a convocation representative on the council of the University of Cape Town.

Baxter published his autobiography, Turn back the pages, in 1954. Two of his interests throughout his life were theatre and music, which gave rise to his bequest of £270 000 to the University of Cape Town for the erection of a theatre for that city, known as the Baxter Theatre.

== Personal life ==
Baxter married Lin Jagger, elder daughter of the prominent Cape Town wholesaler John William Jagger, in April 1911. He and his wife had three children, two daughters and one son.
