= Josias Hendrik Otto du Plessis =

South African politician

Administrator of the Cape Province
- In office 12 May 1958 – 28 April 1960
- Preceded by: P.J. Olivier
- Succeeded by: Nico Malan

Member of Parliament for Stellenbosch
- In office 15 April 1953 – 11 May 1959
- Preceded by: J.A. Loubser
- Succeeded by: Hennie Smit

Personal details
- Born: 23 February 1907 Vanrhynsdorp, Cape Colony
- Died: 28 April 1960 (aged 53) Cape Town, Cape Province, South Africa
- Party: National
- Spouse: Bernice
- Children: 3

Josias Hendrik Otto du Plessis (23 February 1907 - 1960) was Administrator of the Cape Province in South Africa from 1953 to 1958.

He was born in Vanrhynsdorp and was elected as a Member of Parliament for Stellenbosch in 1953.
