= Salt River (House of Assembly of South Africa constituency) =

- Soutrivier
- Former constituency for the South African House of Assembly
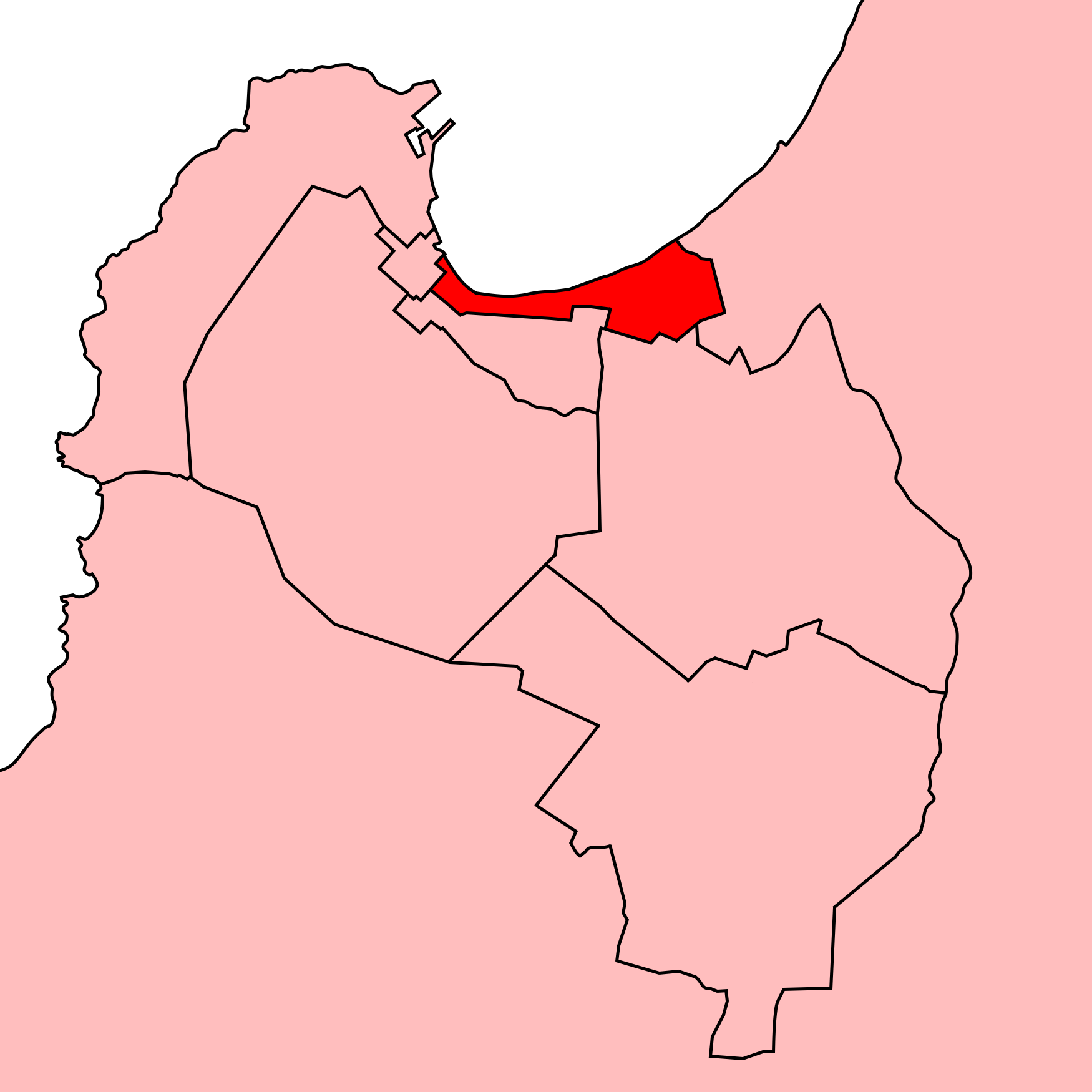
- Location of Salt River within Cape Town (1924)
- Province: Cape of Good Hope
- Electorate: 6,994 (1933)

Former constituency
- Created: 1920; 1943
- Abolished: 1938; 1974
- Number of members: 1
- Last MHA: Hugh Timoney (UP)
- Created from: Liesbeek; Woodstock
- Replaced by: Western Cape

Salt River (Afrikaans: Soutrivier) was a constituency in the Cape Province of South Africa, which existed from 1920 to 1938 and again from 1943 to 1974. It covered parts of the inner suburbs of Cape Town, centred on its namesake suburb of Salt River. Throughout its existence it elected one member to the House of Assembly and one to the Cape Provincial Council.

== Franchise notes ==
When the Union of South Africa was formed in 1910, the electoral qualifications in use in each pre-existing colony were kept in place. The Cape Colony had implemented a "colour-blind" franchise known as the Cape Qualified Franchise, which included all adult literate men owning more than £75 worth of property (controversially raised from £25 in 1892), and this initially remained in effect after the colony became the Cape Province. As of 1908, 22,784 out of 152,221 electors in the Cape Colony were "Native or Coloured". Eligibility to serve in Parliament and the Provincial Council, however, was restricted to whites from 1910 onward.

The first challenge to the Cape Qualified Franchise came with the Women's Enfranchisement Act, 1930 and the Franchise Laws Amendment Act, 1931, which extended the vote to women and removed property qualifications for the white population only – non-white voters remained subject to the earlier restrictions. In 1936, the Representation of Natives Act removed all black voters from the common electoral roll and introduced three "Native Representative Members", white MPs elected by the black voters of the province and meant to represent their interests in particular. A similar provision was made for Coloured voters with the Separate Representation of Voters Act, 1951, and although this law was challenged by the courts, it went into effect in time for the 1958 general election, which was thus held with all-white voter rolls for the first time in South African history. The all-white franchise would continue until the end of apartheid and the introduction of universal suffrage in 1994.

== History ==
Salt River was created in 1920 out of the coastal parts of the Woodstock and Liesbeek constituencies. It was an overwhelmingly working-class seat at the time, and immediately became the Labour Party’s main stronghold in Cape Town. Walter John Snow won the seat for Labour in its first three elections, but in 1929, the Labour Party split over its participation in government alongside the right-wing pro-Afrikaner National Party. Snow, who supported the government, fell victim to its unpopularity in pro-British Cape Town, and was defeated by the South African Party’s Harry Lawrence. Lawrence held the seat until its abolition in 1938, whereupon he moved to neighbouring Woodstock.

Salt River came back after just five years, and Lawrence returned as the constituency’s MP. He continued to represent it until 1961, defecting to the Progressive Party on its foundation in 1959. Like every Progressive candidate except Helen Suzman, he was defeated for re-election in the following general election. United Party candidate Hugh Timoney won the seat, and would hold it until its abolition in 1974.

== Members ==
Election	Member	Party
1920	W. J. Snow	Labour
1921	W. J. Snow	Labour
1924	W. J. Snow	Labour
1929	Harry Lawrence	South African
1933	Harry Lawrence	South African
1934	Harry Lawrence	United
1938	constituency abolished	

Election	Member	Party
1943	Harry Lawrence	United
1948	Harry Lawrence	United
1953	Harry Lawrence	United
1958	Harry Lawrence	United
1959	Harry Lawrence	Progressive
1961	Hugh Timoney	United
1966	Hugh Timoney	United
1970	Hugh Timoney	United
1974	constituency abolished	

== Detailed results ==
=== Elections in the 1920s ===
General election 1920: Salt River
Party	Candidate	Votes	%	±%
Labour	W. J. Snow	1,488	66.2	New
Unionist	F. B. Barling	648	28.8	New
Independent	W. Moore	112	5.0	New
Majority		840	37.4	N/A
Turnout		2,248	54.6	N/A
Labour win (new seat)				

General election 1921: Salt River
Party	Candidate	Votes	%	±%
Labour	W. J. Snow	1,187	59.2	−7.0
South African	A. M. Miller	780	38.9	New
Independent	C. Hagger	37	1.8	New
Majority		407	20.3	N/A
Turnout		2,004	48.3	−6.3
Labour hold		Swing	N/A	

General election 1924: Salt River
Party	Candidate	Votes	%	±%
Labour	W. J. Snow	1,992	66.4	+7.2
South African	H. S. Walker	979	32.6	−6.3
Rejected ballots		30	0.9	N/A
Majority		1,013	33.8	+13.5
Turnout		3,001	61.0	+12.7
Labour hold		Swing	+6.8	

General election 1929: Salt River
Party	Candidate	Votes	%	±%
South African	Harry Lawrence	1,561	50.2	+17.6
Labour (Creswell)	W. J. Snow	1,370	44.1	−22.3
Labour (N.C.)	G. Pearce	154	5.0	New
Rejected ballots		23	0.7	-0.2
Majority		1,013	33.8	N/A
Turnout		3,108	74.6	+13.6
South African gain from Labour		Swing	+20.0	

=== Elections in the 1930s ===
General election 1933: Salt River
Party	Candidate	Votes	%	±%
South African	Harry Lawrence	2,705	67.1	+16.9
Independent Labour	F. Lopes	1,271	31.5	New
Rejected ballots		55	1.4	+0.7
Majority		1,434	35.6	N/A
Turnout		4,031	57.6	−17.0
South African hold		Swing	N/A	

=== Elections in the 1940s ===
General election 1943: Salt River
Party	Candidate	Votes	%	±%
United	Harry Lawrence	5,071	68.6	New
Reunited National	D. G. Swart	1,474	19.9	New
South African Communist Party	I. G. Sacks	851	11.5	New
Majority		3,597	48.7	N/A
Turnout		7,396	75.5	N/A
United win (new seat)				
