= Cape Town Castle (House of Assembly of South Africa constituency) =

Former electoral district of Cape Town, South Africa

- Kaapstad-Kasteel
- Former constituency for the South African House of Assembly
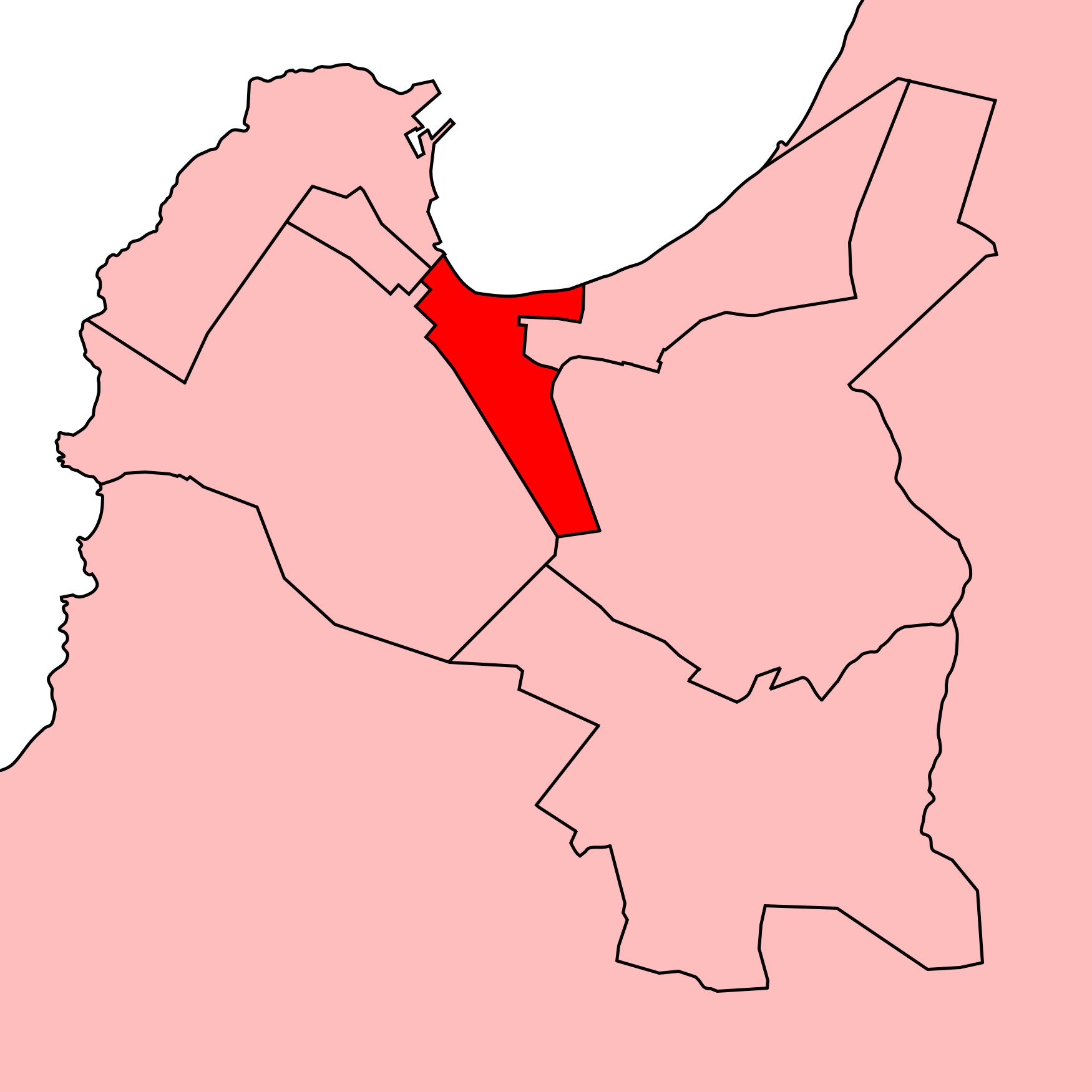
- Location of Cape Town Castle within Cape Town (1910)
- Province: Cape of Good Hope
- Electorate: 10,545 (1946 by)

Former constituency
- Created: 1910
- Abolished: 1958
- Number of members: 1
- Last MHA: Abe Bloomberg (UP)

Cape Town Castle (Afrikaans: Kaapstad-Kasteel), known as Cape Town Hanover Street (Kaapstad-Hanoverstraat) in 1924, was a constituency in the Cape Province of South Africa, which existed from 1910 to 1958. Named after the Castle of Good Hope, it covered an area north of Table Mountain and east of the Cape Town CBD. Throughout its existence it elected one member to the House of Assembly and one to the Cape Provincial Council.

== Franchise notes ==
When the Union of South Africa was formed in 1910, the electoral qualifications in use in each pre-existing colony were kept in place. The Cape Colony had implemented a “colour-blind” franchise known as the Cape Qualified Franchise, which included all adult literate men owning more than £75 worth of property (controversially raised from £25 in 1892), and this initially remained in effect after the colony became the Cape Province. As of 1908, 22,784 out of 152,221 electors in the Cape Colony were “Native or Coloured”. Eligibility to serve in Parliament and the Provincial Council, however, was restricted to whites from 1910 onward.

The first challenge to the Cape Qualified Franchise came with the Women's Enfranchisement Act, 1930 and the Franchise Laws Amendment Act, 1931, which extended the vote to women and removed property qualifications for the white population only – non-white voters remained subject to the earlier restrictions. In 1936, the Representation of Natives Act removed all black voters from the common electoral roll and introduced three “Native Representative Members”, white MPs elected by the black voters of the province and meant to represent their interests in particular. A similar provision was made for Coloured voters with the Separate Representation of Voters Act, 1951, and although this law was challenged by the courts, it went into effect in time for the 1958 general election, which was thus held with all-white voter rolls for the first time in South African history. The all-white franchise would continue until the end of apartheid and the introduction of universal suffrage in 1994.

== History ==
Cape Town Castle was one of the four constituencies created out of the multi-member Cape Town seat for the Cape Parliament. At the time, it extended from Adderley Street in the west to the then-city limit, now in the suburb of Woodstock, in the east and Table Mountain in the south. It changed extent quite frequently in its early years, gaining most of Vredehoek in 1915 but losing it again in 1920 and becoming a much more CBD-focused seat. In 1924, the Castle itself was moved into the neighbouring seat of Salt River, for which reason Cape Town Castle was renamed to Cape Town Hanover Street. However, this was undone in the following election, and for most of its later history, the seat covered the eastern half of the City Bowl.

Like the rest of Cape Town, it was a largely English-speaking seat and loyal to the pro-British side of South African politics. Its first and most notable MP, Morris Alexander, was a leader of Cape Town’s Jewish community, and enjoyed wide popularity in the seat. When his Unionist Party merged with the South African Party, he rejected the merger and sat as a “Constitutional Democrat” independent. Alexander was re-elected under this label for Hanover Street in 1924, but in 1929 opted to run as a Labour candidate in neighbouring Cape Town Gardens, leaving Castle to the SAP candidate A. J. McCallum. However, he returned in 1933, representing first the SAP and then the United Party, and only leaving parliament on his death in 1946. The MP elected in the by-election, Abe Bloomberg, would represent the seat until its abolition in 1958.

== Members ==
Election	Member	Party
1910	Morris Alexander	Unionist
1915	Morris Alexander	Unionist
1920	Morris Alexander	Unionist
1921	Morris Alexander	Constitutional Democrat
1924	Morris Alexander	Constitutional Democrat
1929	A. J. McCallum	South African
1933	Morris Alexander	South African
1934	Morris Alexander	United
1938	Morris Alexander	United
1943	Morris Alexander	United
1946 by	Abe Bloomberg	United
1948	Abe Bloomberg	United
1953	Abe Bloomberg	United
1958	Constituency abolished	

== Detailed results ==
=== Elections in the 1910s ===
General election 1910: Cape Town Castle
Party	Candidate	Votes	%	±%
Unionist	Morris Alexander	1,273	61.6	New
Independent	B. Upington	571	27.6	New
South African	R. Forsyth	224	10.8	New
Majority		702	34.0	N/A
Unionist win (new seat)				

General election 1915: Cape Town Castle
Party	Candidate	Votes	%	±%
Unionist	Morris Alexander	Unopposed		
Unionist hold				

=== Elections in the 1920s ===
General election 1920: Cape Town Castle
Party	Candidate	Votes	%	±%
Unionist	Morris Alexander	1,395	61.0	New
Independent	R. E. Farr	892	39.0	New
Majority		503	22.0	N/A
Turnout		2,287	54.1	N/A
Unionist hold		Swing	N/A	

General election 1921: Cape Town Castle
Party	Candidate	Votes	%	±%
Constitutional Democrat	Morris Alexander	Unopposed		
Constitutional Democrat hold				

General election 1924: Cape Town Hanover Street
Party	Candidate	Votes	%	±%
Constitutional Democrat	Morris Alexander	1,531	51.1	N/A
South African	I. Purcell	1,389	46.4	New
Rejected ballots		75	2.5	N/A
Majority		142	4.7	N/A
Turnout		2,995	66.0	N/A
Constitutional Democrat hold		Swing	N/A	

General election 1929: Cape Town Castle
Party	Candidate	Votes	%	±%
South African	A. J. MacCallum	1,795	61.0	+14.6
Independent	J. Frank	1,054	35.8	New
Rejected ballots		93	3.2	+0.7
Majority		741	25.2	N/A
Turnout		2,942	71.6	+5.6
South African gain from Constitutional Democrat		Swing	N/A	

=== Elections in the 1930s ===
General election 1933: Cape Town Castle
Party	Candidate	Votes	%	±%
South African	Morris Alexander	Unopposed		
South African hold				

General election 1938: Cape Town Castle
Party	Candidate	Votes	%	±%
United	Morris Alexander	3,456	57.1	N/A
Socialist	H. Snitcher	2,113	34.9	New
Dominion	R. F. Strange	385	6.4	New
Rejected ballots		96	1.6	N/A
Majority		1,343	22.2	N/A
Turnout		6,050	73.9	N/A
United hold		Swing	N/A	

=== Elections in the 1940s ===
General election 1943: Cape Town Castle
Party	Candidate	Votes	%	±%
United	Morris Alexander	Unopposed		
United hold				

Cape Town Castle by-election, 4 April 1946
Party	Candidate	Votes	%	±%
United	Abe Bloomberg	4,309	66.5	N/A
Socialist	H. Snitcher	1,571	24.3	New
Independent	A. W. H. Rose	597	9.2	New
Majority		2,738	42.2	N/A
Turnout		6,477	61.4	N/A
United hold		Swing	N/A	
