= Cape Town Central (House of Assembly of South Africa constituency) =

- Kaapstad-Sentraal
- Former constituency for the South African House of Assembly
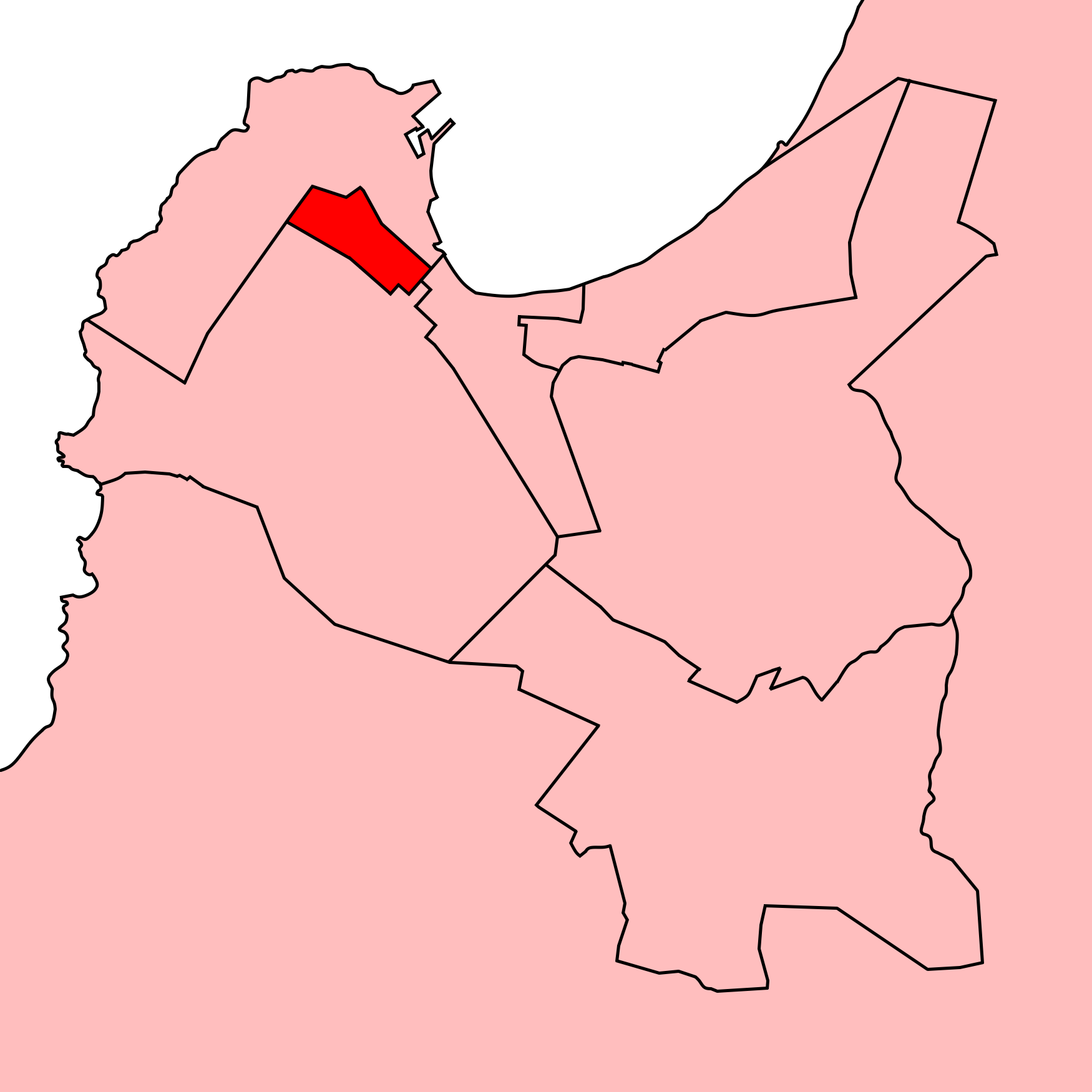
- Location of Cape Town Central within Cape Town (1910)
- Province: Cape of Good Hope
- Electorate: 4,266 (1929)

Former constituency
- Created: 1910
- Abolished: 1943
- Number of members: 1
- Last MHA: (UP)
- Replaced by: Cape Town Castle; Green Point

Cape Town Central (Afrikaans: Kaapstad-Sentraal) was a constituency in the Cape Province of South Africa, which existed from 1910 to 1943. It covered the central business district of Cape Town. Throughout its existence it elected one member to the House of Assembly and one to the Cape Provincial Council.

== Franchise notes ==
When the Union of South Africa was formed in 1910, the electoral qualifications in use in each pre-existing colony were kept in place. The Cape Colony had implemented a “colour-blind” franchise known as the Cape Qualified Franchise, which included all adult literate men owning more than £75 worth of property (controversially raised from £25 in 1892), and this initially remained in effect after the colony became the Cape Province. As of 1908, 22,784 out of 152,221 electors in the Cape Colony were “Native or Coloured”. Eligibility to serve in Parliament and the Provincial Council, however, was restricted to whites from 1910 onward.

The first challenge to the Cape Qualified Franchise came with the Women's Enfranchisement Act, 1930 and the Franchise Laws Amendment Act, 1931, which extended the vote to women and removed property qualifications for the white population only – non-white voters remained subject to the earlier restrictions. In 1936, the Representation of Natives Act removed all black voters from the common electoral roll and introduced three “Native Representative Members”, white MPs elected by the black voters of the province and meant to represent their interests in particular. A similar provision was made for Coloured voters with the Separate Representation of Voters Act, 1951, and although this law was challenged by the courts, it went into effect in time for the 1958 general election, which was thus held with all-white voter rolls for the first time in South African history. The all-white franchise would continue until the end of apartheid and the introduction of universal suffrage in 1994.

== History ==
Cape Town Central was one of the four constituencies created out of the multi-member Cape Town seat for the Cape Parliament. At the time, it extended from Adderley Street in the east and Strand Street in the north to Leeuwen Street in the south and Table Mountain in the west, including much of Cape Town's then-commercial district as well as much of the Bo-Kaap area. In 1920, the Bo-Kaap was taken out of the constituency, which went on to cover an even smaller area for much of the rest of its existence. In 1943, it was split along Adderley Street, with the western half becoming part of the Green Point constituency and the east becoming part of Cape Town Castle.

Like the rest of Cape Town, it was a largely English-speaking seat and loyal to the pro-British side of South African politics. Its first MP, who held the seat from 1910 to 1929, was John William Jagger, a prominent Cape Town businessman who initially represented the Unionist Party. When the Unionists merged with the South African Party in 1920, Jagger followed, and the SAP would hold the seat for the entire remainder of its existence.

== Members ==
Election	Member	Party
1910	John William Jagger	Unionist
1915	John William Jagger	Unionist
1920	John William Jagger	Unionist
1921	John William Jagger	South African
1924	John William Jagger	South African
1929	R. W. Bowen	South African
1933	R. W. Bowen	South African
1938	R. W. Bowen	United
1943	constituency abolished	

== Detailed results ==
=== Elections in the 1910s ===
General election 1910: Cape Town Central
Party	Candidate	Votes	%	±%
Unionist	John William Jagger	1,695	85.1	New
Socialist	A. W. Noon	296	14.9	New
Majority		1,399	70.2	N/A
Unionist win (new seat)				

General election 1915: Cape Town Central
Party	Candidate	Votes	%	±%
Unionist	John William Jagger	1,595	66.0	−19.1
Labour	W. J. Laite	820	34.0	New
Majority		775	32.0	N/A
Turnout		2,415	70.2	N/A
Unionist hold		Swing	N/A	

=== Elections in the 1920s ===
General election 1920: Cape Town Central
Party	Candidate	Votes	%	±%
Unionist	John William Jagger	1,651	64.1	−1.9
Labour	A. Palmer	924	35.9	+1.9
Majority		727	28.2	−3.8
Turnout		2,575	60.2	−10.0
Unionist hold		Swing	-1.9	

General election 1921: Cape Town Central
Party	Candidate	Votes	%	±%
South African	John William Jagger	2,057	80.0	+15.9
Labour	H. M. Fridjohn	515	20.0	−15.9
Majority		727	60.0	+31.8
Turnout		2,572	58.4	−1.8
South African hold		Swing	+15.9	

General election 1924: Cape Town Central
Party	Candidate	Votes	%	±%
South African	John William Jagger	2,285	71.1	−8.9
Independent	W. Moore	906	28.2	New
Rejected ballots		24	0.7	N/A
Majority		1,379	42.9	N/A
Turnout		3,215	68.4	+10.0
South African hold		Swing	N/A	

General election 1929: Cape Town Central
Party	Candidate	Votes	%	±%
South African	R. W. Bowen	2,057	67.9	−3.2
Labour (Creswell)	Robert Forsyth	925	30.5	New
Rejected ballots		47	1.6	+0.9
Majority		1,132	37.4	N/A
Turnout		3,029	71.0	+2.6
South African hold		Swing	N/A	

=== Elections in the 1930s ===
General election 1933: Cape Town Central
Party	Candidate	Votes	%	±%
South African	R. W. Bowen	Unopposed		
South African hold				

General election 1938: Cape Town Central
Party	Candidate	Votes	%	±%
United	R. W. Bowen	4,499	84.4	N/A
Dominion	H. J. Smith	792	14.9	New
Rejected ballots		39	0.7	N/A
Majority		3,707	69.6	N/A
Turnout		5,330	66.3	N/A
United hold		Swing	N/A	
