= Toby Fine =

South African ballet dancer

Toby Fine (6 October 1931, Cape Town, South Africa - 1 November 2010, Weybridge, Surrey, England) was a South African ballet dancer. She was a member of both the New York City Ballet and Johannesburg Festival Ballet Company.

== Early life ==
Fine, the daughter of Issy and Paula Fine, was born in Cape Town. She attended Athlone High School in Johannesburg before enrolling at the Royal Academy of Dance in London where she gained her Advanced Honours Diploma and Solo Seal. In 1949 she was awarded the Adeline Genée Cup for the best dancer in Southern Africa and won the SA Ballet Open Competition in 1946, 1947, 1948 and 1949.

== Career ==
She was a soloist for the New York City Ballet for a season after George Balanchine, then director of the company, picked her to replace an injured dancer for a performance at the Royal Opera House and kept her. After two years Fine returned to South Africa and became the Prima Ballerina for the Johannesburg Festival Ballet Company where she danced in Swan Lake alongside Margot Fonteyn and Michael Somes.

== Personal life ==
After returning to Cape Town, she married David Bloomberg on 24 February 1957 and they had two children together. They were later Mayor and Mayoress of Cape Town from 1973 to 1975. When Fine grew unwell, they moved to the UK in 1988 where she had a successful kidney transplant. Fine died in Weybridge, Surrey in England on 1 November 2010. The Bloomberg family set up the Toby Fine Ballet Fund in her memory. The fund sponsors ballet performances and provides scholarships to dancers.
