= George Brown (South African politician) =

Scottish trade unionist and politician in South Africa

Assemblyman for Germiston
- In office 1924-1932

Personal details
- Born: 1870 Glasgow, Scotland
- Died: August 1932 (aged 61–62)
- Party: Labour

George Brown (1870 – August 1932) was a Scottish trade unionist and politician, active in South Africa.

Born in Glasgow to a mining family, Brown completed an apprenticeship as a boilermaker and in 1890 joined the United Society of Boilermakers (USB). In 1897, he emigrated to South Africa, settling in the Transvaal. While he maintained his membership of the local branch of the USB, he became concerned that it was not attracting membership from workers who had served their apprenticeship in South Africa. As a result, in 1916, he founded the South African Boilermakers' Society (SABS).

Brown was elected as the first president of SABS, and spent his time touring the country, giving speeches, to attract members. He joined the Labour Party, and at the South African general election, 1924 won a seat in Germiston. At this point, he was made honorary life president of SABS. He died, still in office, in 1932.
