= Sam Kahn =

'Native Representative' Member of Parliament for Western Cape Province
- In office 1949–1952

Personal details
- Born: 15 December 1911 Cape Town, Union of South Africa
- Died: 25 August 1987 (aged 75) Israel
- Party: Communist Party of South Africa (until 1950)
- Spouse: Pauline Kahn
- Education: University of Cape Town

Sam Kahn (15 December 1911 – 25 August 1987) was a South African Communist and Member of Parliament from 1949 to 1952, for one of the constituencies representing native African voters. Born in Cape Town, he joined the Communist Party of South Africa and earned an LL.B. degree from the University of Cape Town in 1932. From 1938 onwards, he was nearly continuously a member of the central executive committee of the CPSA.

From 1943 to 1952, he was a member of Cape Town city council, and on 17 November 1948 he was elected to South African House of Assembly as a Communist, representing native African voters in the western Cape Province (from 1937 to 1960, Black African voters voted for 'native representative' MPs instead of constituency MPs with White voters), campaigning on his disapproval of Prime Minister Malan's "nazi doctrine of white supremacy". He made his maiden speech on 27 January 1949 during a debate on a no confidence motion moved by the leader of the opposition, Field Marshal J. C. Smuts.

Expelled from parliament in 1952 upon suspicion of operating with illegal Communist organisations (the CPSA being outlawed in 1950), he left South Africa permanently in 1960 and settled down in the United Kingdom.

== Early days ==
Sam came from a family of 9 children being the youngest or second youngest. His father died in the 1918 flu pandemic when he was only seven years old. His mother Betty had to bring the family on her own; she never remarried. They were desperately poor as a result of there being no breadwinner. As a result, Sam had to walk 3 miles to school and back every day. This made him into a keen walker later on in life. Sam went to work at age sixteen in order to help support the family. Betty was very possessive and didn't want any of her children to get married, so very few of his siblings did get married. Sam's mothers' maiden name was Marx, his father was Joseph Kahn. Betty Marx had a musical brother who emigrated to America and whose son Gerald Marks co-wrote the hit song "All of me" which was covered by Dean Martin and others and became a big hit.

Sam studied for a bachelor's degree in Greek and Latin at the University of Cape Town. He went on to do a law qualification and qualified as a barrister. However he lacked the £5 necessary to get the piece of paper which would have enabled him to operate as a barrister. He decided to practice as a solicitor instead of a barrister because he felt that by doing so he could remain close to the people he was determined to serve. Sam worked in the Traffic department of Cape Town City Council (1943 to 1952) and became involved in the analysis of traffic accidents, helping to make the roads of Cape Town safer by applying his skills in town planning. Later he practised as a solicitor, often acting in cases where a black person had been unfairly treated as a result of the draconian laws which had been implemented by the ruling Nationalist Party; laws such as the Group Areas Act of 1951.

Sam Kahn also worked in a legal practice in downtown Cape Town for approximately 20 years, whilst simultaneously pursuing his political career. Popular amongst Africans, he defended many as clients in the course of his legal work. A member of the Cape Town City Council from 1943 to 1952, he was elected to Parliament by the Africans of the Cape western district in 1949 but was expelled three years later on the grounds that was a Communist.

He had a relationship (outside of wedlock) with Cissie Gool (known as "The Jewel of District Six") who also served on the Cape Town City Council, prior to his marriage to Pauline Kahn. He also fathered a daughter in South Africa with another woman but did not keep any contact with his daughter or provide her with any support.

In 1954 he visited Russia. Prohibited in 1954 from attending gatherings, he was subsequently convicted of violating his ban, but the conviction was overturned on appeal. He left South Africa illegally in 1960 by spiriting himself out of the country (via Swaziland) in disguise – he grew a beard and dyed it red. This was typical of his sense of humour.

Sam Kahn had an intense dislike for garlic and onions. If there was any trace of either in his food he would ask politely for it do be taken away. This often provoked amusing incidents at restaurants. where Sam would attempt to explain the problem to waiters who, as often as not, had a very poor grasp of the English language. The interchanges, usually lighthearted and often humorous, would go on for 4–5 minutes, and the topic would be; how had the errant material appeared in his food ? It was quite effective as an ice-breaker and a vehicle for Sam's very sophisticated sense of humour;it also allowed Sam to get to know his waiter better – this always fostered good relations better those being served and those doing the serving. Occasionally the discussions got a little bit heated, particularly if the waiter tried to deny the existence of the offending material in his food. While waiting for the food to be served, Sam liked to play noughts and crosses on paper napkins with his charges. Another of his favourite games which he used to pass the time was Animal, Vegetable and Mineral; this was in the days before the advent of the smart phone and one had to use simple devices in order to alleviate the boredom of waiting by playing games using things like pen and paper or speech.

Sam was a marvellous raconteur, one of the last of his generation; he was very entertaining, especially at dinner parties and would have his captive audience either transfixed, or in stitches. His particular forte was humorist jokes with a South African slant, and in particular, he had a vast repertoire of "Van De Merwe" jokes. He particularly liked to recount the joke about the bathroom attendant who became a millionaire ostrich farmer because at his first job interview he admitted that he could not write and lost the job, which turned out to his advantage. Sam's jokes nearly always had a moral sting in their tale which lent substance and an ethical dimension.

He left after getting a tip off that he was about to be arrested by BOSS. He donned a disguise and made his way out of the country through Swaziland. In Swaziland he and some other refugees chartered a small aircraft to take them North. The story has it that at one point in the journey Sam looked out the window and noticed a liquid leaking from the plane. He asked the pilot what it might be, and it turned out that the cap had mysteriously been left off the fuel tank. This may or may not have been an attempt at sabotage. He eventually arrived in England to be reunited with his wife and children, who had left a few months earlier in December 1959. Pauline and the children travelled from Cape Town to Southampton on an oceangoing mail liner called the RMS Pendennis Castle.

In England Sam settled in North London (1960–1984) and then in Guildford (1984–1987). Sam had four children with his wife Pauline, all boys. Sam Kahn died in 1987.

Barry Joseph Kahn, his eldest son, was born in South Africa in 1950, studied medicine at University College Hospital London and went on to become a Consultant Anaesthetist in Wexham Park Hospital near Slough, doing occasional work with the renowned heart surgeon Magdi Yacoub at the Brompton Hospital in London. Despite being a Communist he sent three of his children to grammar school and one of his children to private schools and in his personal life liked to enjoy "the best of everything" according to his brother-in-law.

Although Jewish, Sam was a vehement critic of Israeli policies and an anti-Zionist. In his latter years he concentrated predominantly on the Arab-Israeli conflict, whilst at the same time retaining an active interest in South African politics. He was visiting Israel when he died in a car accident in Karmiel, where his cousin lived. Politically, he never renounced or denounced Stalin despite the millions of people who were murdered in the Soviet Union under Stalin. He remained an orthodox communist and never came to terms with the reality of what had happened under Stalin. In broad terms, he was brought as up an orthodox Jew, renounced the religion at a young age and went on to become an orthodox Communist.

Riva Joffe, who was also Jewish and an anti-Zionist, gave the eulogy at his funeral.

He only visited South Africa once after his departure from South Africa in 1960, in order to attend the funeral of his brother Julius Kahn with whom he corresponded regularly during his years of exile, and was given permission to remain on South African soil for 48 hours by the authorities.

His plane landed in Cape Town from England 12 hours behind schedule, and whilst he pleaded for an extension from the South African authorities in order to make up for the time lost due to the delay, this was denied him.
