= Administrative divisions of South Africa =

Territorial subdivision of South Africa

The primary administrative divisions of South Africa are the nine provinces. The provinces are divided into 52 districts, which are either metropolitan or district municipalities, with the district municipalities being further divided into local municipalities. Metropolitan and local municipalities are divided into wards.

== Provinces ==
The provinces of South Africa

Since 1994, South Africa has been divided into nine provinces: the Eastern Cape, the Free State, Gauteng, KwaZulu-Natal, Limpopo, Mpumalanga, North West, the Northern Cape and the Western Cape. The boundaries of the provinces, which are specified in the national constitution, have been altered twice by constitutional amendment.

Each province is governed by a unicameral legislature elected by party-list proportional representation, and a Premier elected by the legislature. The provincial legislatures are represented in the national Parliament by their delegations to the National Council of Provinces.

== Metropolitan municipalities ==
The eight metropolitan municipalities

Eight of South Africa's largest cities are governed as metropolitan municipalities, which exercise all municipal functions in their areas, in contrast with the divided responsibilities in areas with the district/local system (see below). Metropolitan municipalities are governed by councils in which half of the councillors are directly elected from the wards (see below) and half are elected by party-list proportional representation.

The eight metropolitan municipalities are: Buffalo City (East London), City of Cape Town (Cape Town), Ekurhuleni (East Rand), eThekwini (Durban), City of Johannesburg (Johannesburg), Mangaung (Bloemfontein), Nelson Mandela Bay (Gqeberha), and City of Tshwane (Pretoria).

== District municipalities ==
Borders of the district and metropolitan municipalities

Outside the metropolitan municipalities, the rest of South Africa is divided into 44 district municipalities. These cover large regions of the provinces, and are in turn divided into local municipalities (see below). The district municipalities are responsible for "district-wide" municipal functions, including development planning, bulk supply of utilities, arterial roads, and public transport. In district councils, 60% of the councillors are nominated by the councils of the constituent local municipalities, while the remaining 40% are elected by the population by party-list proportional representation.

== Local municipalities ==
Borders of the local municipalities

The district municipalities are divided into a total of 205 local municipalities. In general, a local municipality includes one or more towns and the surrounding villages and rural areas. A local municipality exercises all the municipal functions not carried out by the district municipality within which it lies. Local municipalities' councils are elected in the same way as those of metropolitan municipalities: half from wards and half by proportional representation.

== Wards ==
Ward boundaries

Metropolitan and local municipalities are divided into wards, with each ward electing one councillor to the municipal council. As of the elections of 1 November 2021, there are 4,468 wards in South Africa.
