= Germiston District (House of Assembly of South Africa constituency) =

- Germiston-Distrik
- Former constituency for the South African House of Assembly
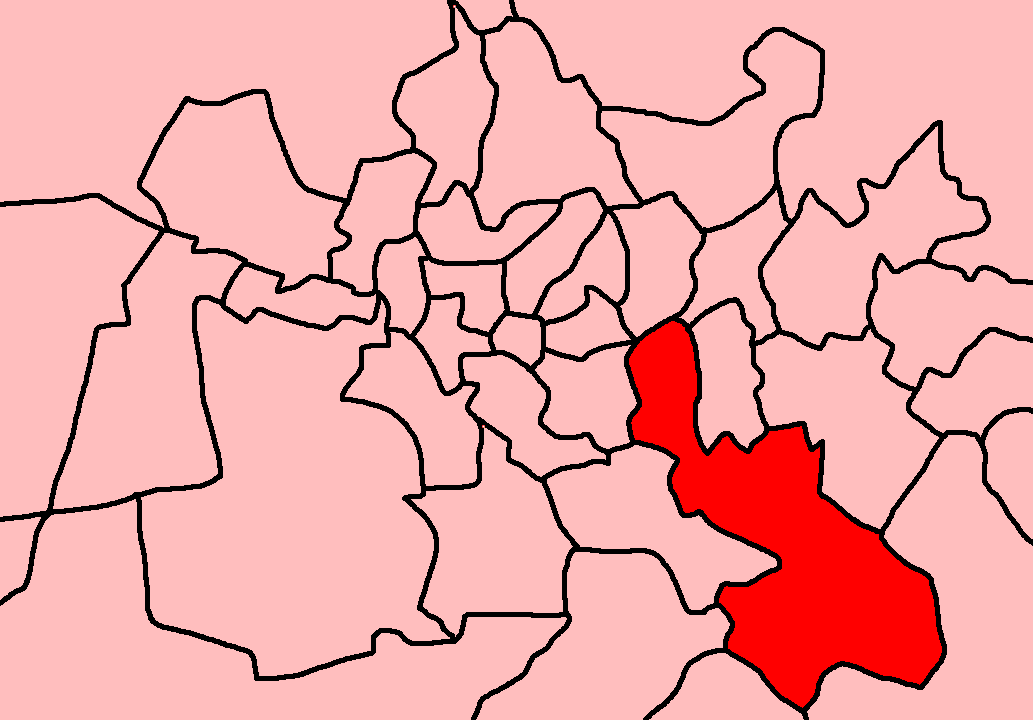
- Location of Germiston District within the Witwatersrand (1981)
- Province: Transvaal
- Electorate: 23,644 (1989)

Former constituency
- Created: 1943
- Abolished: 1994
- Number of members: 1
- Last MHA: J. F. Bosman (NP)
- Created from: Germiston North; Germiston South
- Replaced by: Gauteng

Germiston District (Afrikaans: Germiston-Distrik) was a constituency in the Transvaal Province of South Africa, which existed from 1943 to 1994. It covered a part of the East Rand surrounding the town of Germiston. Throughout its existence it elected one member to the House of Assembly and one to the Transvaal Provincial Council.

== Franchise notes ==
When the Union of South Africa was formed in 1910, the electoral qualifications in use in each pre-existing colony were kept in place. In the Transvaal Colony, and its predecessor the South African Republic, the vote was restricted to white men, and as such, elections in the Transvaal Province were held on a whites-only franchise from the beginning. The franchise was also restricted by property and education qualifications until the 1933 general election, following the passage of the Women's Enfranchisement Act, 1930 and the Franchise Laws Amendment Act, 1931. From then on, the franchise was given to all white citizens aged 21 or over. Non-whites remained disenfranchised until the end of apartheid and the introduction of universal suffrage in 1994.

== History ==
Germiston District was created in 1943 out of the previous Germiston North and South seats, alongside the recreated Germiston constituency. Its first MP, J. G. N. Strauss, had previously represented Germiston South, and was a protégé of Jan Smuts who took over as leader of the United Party upon Smuts' death in 1950. Strauss was ousted as party leader in 1956 and left parliament two years later, but the UP continued to hold the seat until 1966.

In 1982, a hardline faction around Andries Treurnicht broke off from the governing National Party to form the Conservative Party, and Germiston District MP E. M. Scholtz was among those who defected to the new party. He was defeated for re-election in 1987 by NP candidate Jacobus Frederik Bosman, who held the seat until the end of apartheid. It was the last seat in South Africa with "District" as part of its name, all other peripheral seats having been abolished at the 1974 delimitation.

== Members ==
Election	Member	Party
1943	J. G. N. Strauss	United
1948	J. G. N. Strauss	United
1953	J. G. N. Strauss	United
1958	I. S. Fourie	United
1961	Henry Tucker	United
1966	J. A. van Tonder	National
1970	J. A. van Tonder	National
1974	J. A. van Tonder	National
1977	J. A. van Tonder	National
1979 by	E. M. Scholtz	National
1981	E. M. Scholtz	National
1982	E. M. Scholtz	Conservative
1987	J. F. Bosman	National
1989	J. F. Bosman	National
1994	Constituency abolished	
