= John William Jagger =

South African politician

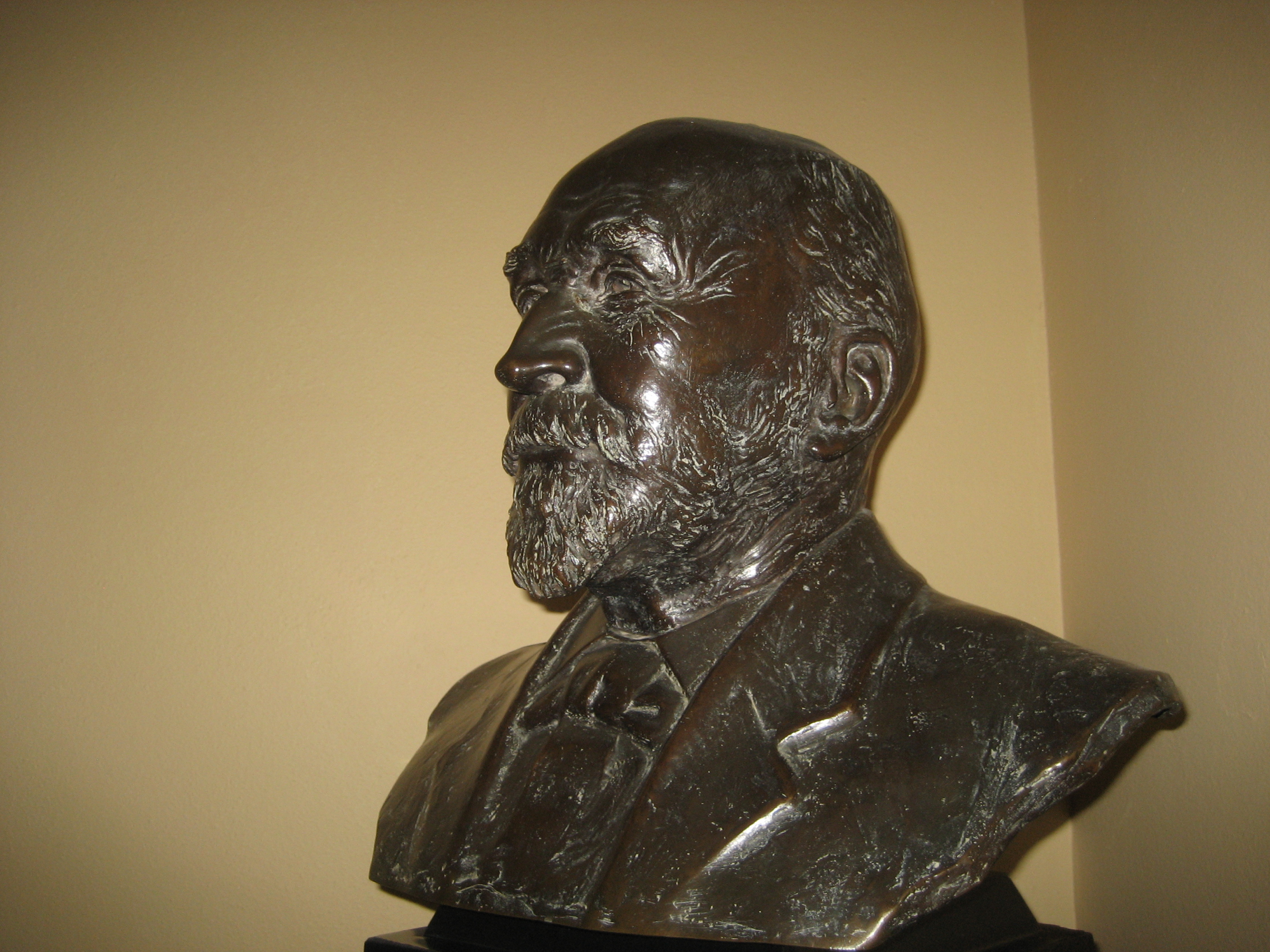
- Minister of Railways and Ports
- In office 1921–1924
- Prime Minister: Jan Smuts
- Preceded by: Thomas Watt
- Succeeded by: Charl W. Malan

Personal details
- Born: 29 September 1859 Yorkshire, England
- Died: 20 June 1930 (aged 70) Cape Town, South Africa
- Party: Unionist Party; South African Party

John William Jagger (20 September 1859, Yorkshire - 20 June 1930, Cape Town) was a South African businessman and cabinet minister.

He emigrated to South Africa in 1880 and became a clerk in a business in Cape Town. In 1883 he established his own business as an importer of fabrics and laid the foundation for the later well-known firm by his name. He took an active interest in the economy and became a spokesman for trade. In November 1902 he became a member of the Cape Legislative Assembly (where he was a strong supporter of free trade) for Cape Town Central in the House of Assembly.

From 1908 to 1909 he was a member of the National Convention which drafted the South Africa Act 1909 and paved the way for Union. He was re-elected as a Member of the Union in the 1915 election. In 1921 he became Minister of Railways in Gen. Jan Smuts's cabinet, during which he had to carry out the unpopular policy of retrenchments. He contributed extensively to educational causes, including the Jagger Library at the University of Cape Town, which is named after him. He died in 1930 in Cape Town.

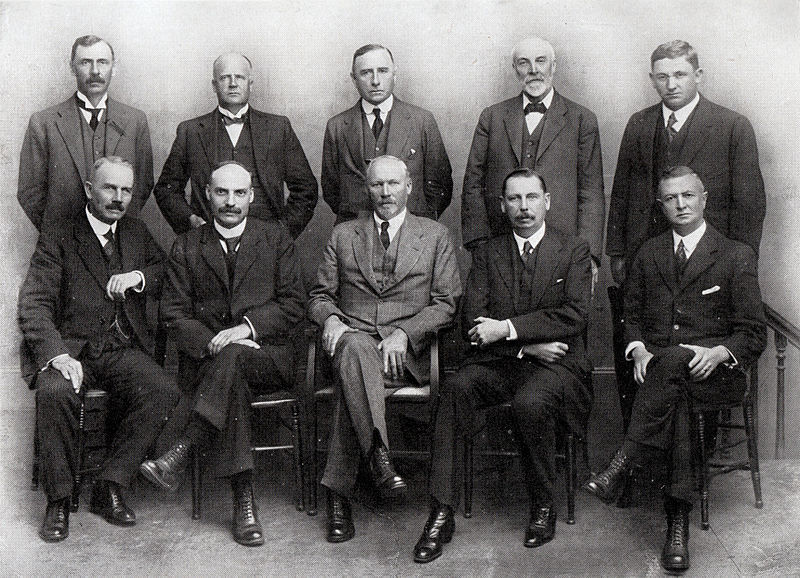
Smuts Cabinet c1923

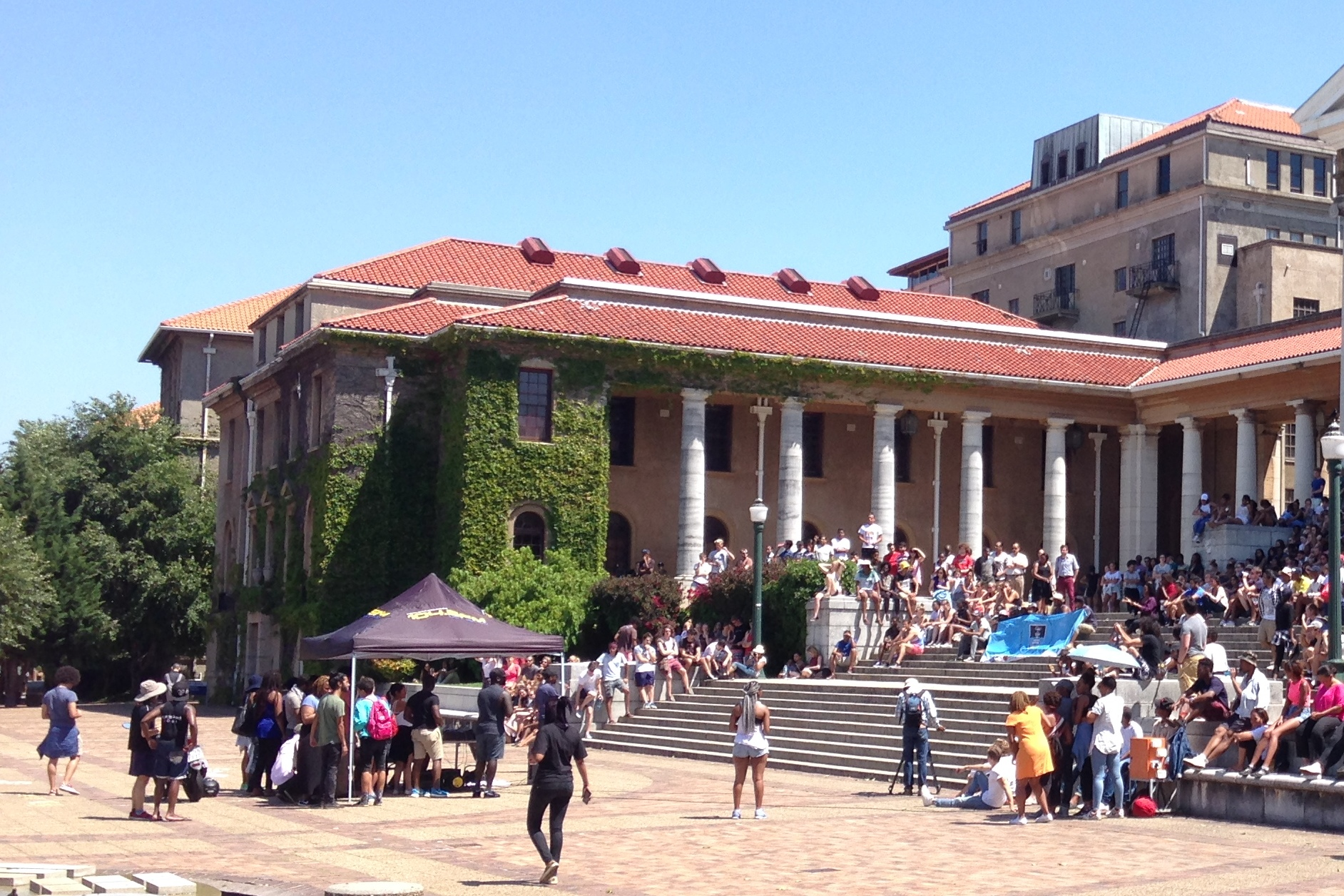
Jagger Library as it appeared during a protest in 2015

== Sources ==
- Albertyn, dr. C.F. (ed.) 1962. Die Afrikaanse Kinderensiklopedie. Cape Town, Bloemfontein, Johannesburg: National Bookshop Ltd.
- Rosenthal, Eric. 1978. Encyclopaedia of Southern Africa . Cape Town and Johannesburg: Juta and Company Limited.
