= Willem Adriaan Cruywagen =

South African politician (1921–2013)

Administrator of the Transvaal
- In office 16 July 1979 – 31 May 1988
- President: P. W. Botha
- Preceded by: Sybrand Gerhardus Johannes van Niekerk
- Succeeded by: Daniel "Danie" Hough

Minister of National Education

Minister of Bantu Affairs

Deputy Minister of Bantu Affairs

Minister of Home Affairs

Deputy Minister of Home Affairs

Personal details
- Born: 1921
- Died: 10 July 2013 (aged 91–92) Germiston, South Africa

Dr Willem Adriaan Cruywagen (1921 – 10 July 2013) was a moderate South African politician during apartheid, and an academic and author.

== Personal life ==
Cruywagen moved to the town of Germiston in the mid-1940s, where he taught history, geography, and music before becoming involved in politics. He married his wife, Snow, in 1949. Germiston's Bertha Gxowa Hospital had previously been named Willem Cruywagen Hospital in the 1970s, in his honour.

He wrote Die Cruywagens: ‘n Suid-Afrikaanse familie, Deel II, which was released in March 2013.

== Politics ==
He was elected as a member of the House of Assembly for Germiston in 1961.

He was a deputy minister and minister of the departments of Home Affairs, Bantu Affairs and National Education.

In the 1970s, as Minister of Education, Cruywagen approved the establishment of a university in the Free State, which lead to the creation of the University of the Free State.

In 1979, Cruywagen became Administrator of the Transvaal, a position in which he served until he retired in May, 1988.

In 1986, international pressure on apartheid had mounted so much that the American film company Columbia Pictures threatened to boycott South Africa's Ster Kinekor theatre chain if they did not end segregation of their cinemas in 1987. In January 1987, the then-Pietersburg (now Polokwane) Town Council of the Transvaal, controlled by the Conservative Party, recommended that a cinema in the town continue to be segregated. Officially, the cinema was reserved for whites only; however, blacks were allowed entry through a back entrance and to view from a special gallery. The owner of the cinema, Sydney Segal, collected more than 1,000 signatures in a petition calling for desegregation, and Cruywagen overruled the town council's recommendation, approving the opening of the cinema to all races.

In the late 1980s, Cruywagen described the transformation of African councils from advisory bodies in the 1970s into local authorities in the 1980s as the "most important constitutional event in the history of this country", and recommended that black and white people jointly govern the Transvaal province.

Cruywagen was a member of the National Monuments Council from 1990.
