= Denis Gem Shepstone =

South African politician (1888–1966)

Denis Gem Shepstone KStJ (7 February 1888 – 30 June 1966) was a South African politician.

Born in Durban, the grandson of Sir Theophilus Shepstone, Shepstone studied law at Natal University College, obtaining the Natal Law Certificate in 1911. Shepstone served as Administrator of Natal Province from February 1948 to May 1958. He was appointed the first Chancellor of the University of Natal in 1949, a position he held until his death.

He was a member of the Senate of the Union of South Africa and a South African delegate to the General Assembly of the United Nations. In 1959 he was appointed a Knight of the Most Venerable Order of the Hospital of Saint John of Jerusalem by Queen Elizabeth II. Also in 1959, he received an honorary LLD from the University of Natal.

Denis Shepstone died on 30 June 1966, aged 78, in Pietermaritzburg.
