= Morris Alexander =

South African Jewish politician (1877–1946)

Morris Alexander KC
- מאָריס אַלעקסאנדער
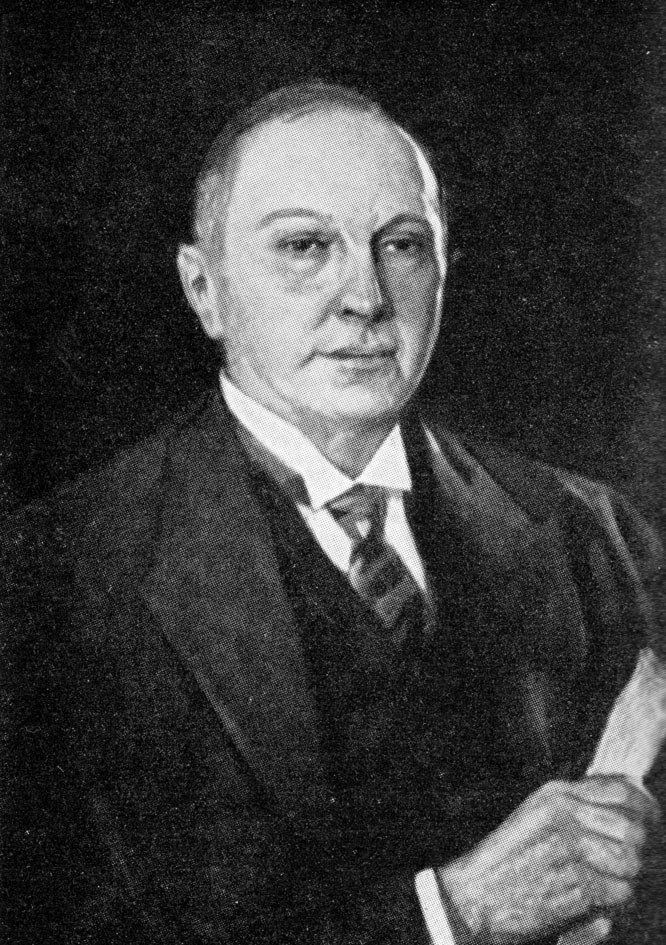
- Portrait by J. H. Amshewitz, c. 1930

Member of the House of Assembly for Cape Town Castle
- In office 1931 – 23 January 1946
- In office 15 September 1910 – 12 June 1929

Member of the Cape Parliament for Cape Town
- In office 1908–1910

Personal details
- Born: 4 December 1877 Znin, Kingdom of Prussia, German Empire (now Żnin, Poland)
- Died: 24 January 1946 (aged 68) Cape Town, South Africa
- Party: Progressive (c. 1905–1910); Unionist (1910–1921); Constitutional Democratic (1921–c. 1929); South African Party (1931–1934); United (1934–1946)
- Spouses: Ruth Schechter (m. 1907; div. 1935); Enid Asenath Baumberg (m. 1935–1946)
- Children: 3
- Education: South African College (BA); St John's College, Cambridge (LLB)

Morris Alexander KC (Yiddish: מאָריס אַלעקסאנדער; 4 December 1877 – 24 January 1946) was a South African lawyer and politician who was a leading figure of Cape Town's Jewish community. He is best known for his successful campaign to have Yiddish recognized as a European language by colonial authorities, allowing thousands of Jews to immigrate to South Africa. A prominent liberal, Alexander served in the South African House of Assembly from 1910 until his death in 1946.

== Biography ==
=== Early life and education ===
Morris Alexander was born on 4 December 1877, in Znin, then part of the Kingdom of Prussia in the German Empire. He was the eldest of seven children of Abraham Alexander and Flora Lewin. His family were German Jews; they moved to the South Africa in 1881. He interrupted his private education in Cape Town in 1891 to financially support his parents in Johannesburg, taking jobs first as a clerk for the National Bank and then as an employee of the Cape Colony rail service.

Alexander enrolled at South African College in 1893, receiving a Bachelor of Arts degree in 1897. He then attended St John's College, Cambridge, receiving a Bachelor of Laws degree in 1900. He was called to the bar in June of that year and began a law practice in Cape Town on 15 November 1900. Alexander would be appointed King's Counsel in 1919, and at some point taught law at Diocesan College.

=== Advocacy ===
As a young lawyer in Cape Town, Alexander joined journalist Dovid Goldblat in a campaign for the reclassification of Yiddish as a European language in South Africa. A 1902 law required that prospective immigrants to the Cape take a European language literacy test; the pair "fought so that Yiddish might be considered one such language, and thus Jewish immigrants would be able to enter the country". In 1903, Alexander led a delegation of Jewish community leaders to the Cape Colony's attorney general Thomas Graham, who accepted their request to recognize Yiddish as European, which allowed thousands of Jews to immigrate to South Africa. This represented a shift away from traditional Jewish politics, as Jews were traditionally forbidden to represent themselves as Jews in matters not related to religion. Alexander would later consider the recognition of Yiddish to be "the most important achievement of his public life".

On 4 September 1904, Alexander organized the delegation of community leaders into the Cape Colony Jewish Board of Deputies, which became the dominant Jewish organization in the colony. He would serve as its chairman and as vice president of the unified South African Jewish Board of Deputies from the organizations' foundations until the 1930s. A supporter of Zionism, he was also the president of the New Hebrew Congregation in Cape Town for forty years.

=== Political career ===
Alexander was elected to the Cape Town City Council in 1905, serving until 1913. He was elected to the Parliament of the Cape of Good Hope in the 1908 election as a member of the Progressive Party, receiving 5,027 votes in the Cape Town constituency. He served in the Cape Parliament until 1910, when it was merged with the other colonial parliaments following the establishment of the Union of South Africa. Alexander was elected to the unified South African House of Assembly in the 1910 election for the Cape Town Castle constituency, and would serve as a member of parliament until his death in 1946. (Note: Alexander was briefly out of parliament after his defeat in the 1929 election, but was re-elected in 1931.)

In addition to being a leading figure in Cape Town's Jewish community, (Note: Alexander was seen as being able to unite both the traditional Anglo-Jewish elite amongst whom he was raised and the impoverished Eastern European Jews for whom he advocated.) Alexander was also a prominent liberal and an advocate against discriminatory laws affecting non-white communities . In June 1907, he married Ruth Schechter – an acquaintance from his time at Cambridge and the daughter of Solomon Schechter, the president of the Jewish Theological Seminary of America – in New York. The couple's home in Cape Town would become a meeting place for visiting Indian dignitaries, through which Alexander became associated with Mahatma Gandhi. He was also associated with W. E. B. Du Bois and Bertha Solomon.

Beginning in the 1920s, Alexander and Ruth developed irreconcilable political differences. While Alexander was a more traditional liberal, Ruth was a Marxist feminist. In the 1921 general election, she convinced Alexander not to join Jan Smuts's South African Party – which she viewed as increasingly racist – and instead run as an independent candidate. (Note: The Unionist Party, which Alexander had belonged to since the union in 1910, had merged into the South African Party in 1921.) Alexander was re-elected as a member of the newly-formed Constitutional Democratic Party, and would serve as the party's president and sole parliamentary member from 1921 until 1929. He did join the South African Party in 1931 despite his criticism of its efforts to restrict Jewish immigration over the previous decade. Ruth was irked with her husband in 1923 when he declared that Judaism was "the very antithesis of Bolshevism" in a speech condemning the Rand Rebellion. She was further radicalized when her sister was arrested at the Loray Mill strike in the United States.

The couple's breaking point came in 1930, when Alexander supported a successful bill enacted by the government of J. B. M. Hertzog which gave white women the right to vote. Ruth, increasingly frustrated with her husband's pragmatic liberalism, criticized this law as regressive for excluding non-white women and for being a method to further dilute the non-white vote. Ruth initially declared her intention to not register to vote, but upon being informed by Alexander that not registering was a crime, she instead stated her intent to divorce him "the moment their children were old enough to care for themselves". Ruth left South Africa with her lover in 1933; two years later, she and Alexander divorced. Two months after his divorce, Alexander married Enid Asenath Baumberg of Sydney, Australia. Throughout the 1930s, Alexander was a strong opponent of the growing Nazi movement in South Africa.

Alexander died in Cape Town on 24 January 1946. His second wife Enid published his biography in 1957, and his papers are held at the University of Cape Town Libraries.
