= Jacobus Gideon Nel Strauss =

South African politician (1900–1990)

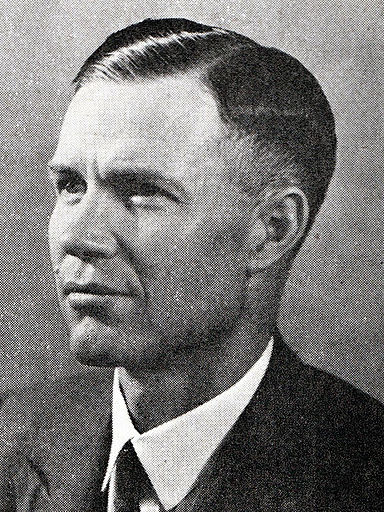

Leader of the United Party
- In office 1950–1956
- Preceded by: Jan Christiaan Smuts
- Succeeded by: De Villiers Graaff

Personal details
- Born: 17 December 1900 Calvinia, Cape Colony
- Died: 7 March 1990 (aged 89) Cape Town, South Africa
- Party: United Party

Jacobus Gideon Nel Strauss, known as Koos Strauss, Kosie Strauss or J. G. N. Strauss (17 December 1900 – 7 March 1990), was a South African politician who was the leader of the South African United Party from 1950 to 1956.

== Early life ==
When Strauss was young, he idolized Jan Smuts and developed such a close relationship that the Smuts family regarded him as an adopted son. Smuts instilled him to leadership values, that a public figure had no right to place personal happiness before duty and responsibility, or to indulge in self-pity.

== Political career ==
Strauss had earlier been minister of agriculture in the cabinet of Jan Smuts from 1943 until the defeat of the Smuts government in 1948. In the 1953 election the United Party under Strauss lost seven seats, while their opponents the National Party gained twenty-five more seats and a majority in Parliament. Following this election, the United Party suffered two splits, creating the Liberal Party and the Union Federal Party. In 1954, a further split resulted in the National Conservative Party. In 1956, while plagued by ill health and convalescing in England, he asked his party to decide whether they wished to keep him on as leader. They declined to do so: the first time the leader of a South African political party had been forcibly removed. Strauss was succeeded as United Party leader by De Villiers Graaff.

As opposition leader, Strauss accepted political and social segregation of races but opposed the National Party government's disregard for the rule of law and its removal of "Coloured" voters from the electoral rolls which had been entrenched in the South African constitution but arbitrarily removed by the apartheid government. For this reason, he'd opposed the Suppression of Communism Act despite being an anti-communist. In a forceful speech in 1954, Strauss had pushed a policy of "white leadership with just recognition of non-European aspirations." He said the United Party accepted and welcomed the economic integration, as it was in the interest of South Africa as a whole, and that apartheid was merely delaying the inevitable. The speech had impressed even the hostile Die Burger, but caused a backlash from right-wing United Party members. They accused Strauss of going out of his way to secure candidates with extremely liberal views, and of making a victory impossible by not cracking down on them. In contrast, progressives were unhappy that Strauss was unwilling to confront these dissidents. Strauss admitted that he'd wanted to resign, but "an overwhelming sense of duty" demanded he continue.

Strauss was responsible for the coloured vote constitutional crisis, when he had the United Party resolutely oppose the full disenfranchisement of blacks. Short of a two-thirds majority, Malan hoped to win over right-wing United Party members with a free vote, meaning they could vote according to how they felt. Since Strauss rejected this, the NP fell short of a two-third's majority, resulting in a constitutional crisis. Out of patience, J. G. Strijdom introduced a bill to simply enlarge the upper house, so it could be packed with National Party members. Outraged, Strauss condemned the law as a "monstrosity", an "inherently evil measure", and "far-reaching strides to a one-party, to a police state." At this, Strijdom said Strauss wanted a white genocide in South Africa. However, in the midst of the debate, a dispute erupted in the United Party over the reluctance of Strauss to commit to restoring blacks to the common voters roll should the National Party succeed.

For Dr. Bernard Friedman, who later cofounded the Progressive Party, this stance was one of opportunism and a lack of principle. Under him, six progressive MPs threatened to resign if no categorical assurance was given. A compromise was reached when Strauss declared that after returning to power, the UP would correct the injustice done to blacks, but in a way that'd serve national interests. Friedman refused to accept this and resigned. In September 1955, he was defeated by a right-wing United Party member. Helen Suzman concluded that Strauss was the type of leader who chose to placate his enemies at the expense of his friends. Disillusioned, they supported the idea of replacing him with De Villiers Graaff, whom they found more likeable. The United Party voted Strauss out and replaced him with Graaff. Without Strauss to reign in the conservatives and protect the progressives, however, the United Party lurched to the right, stopped actively resisting apartheid, and eventually fractured.

Strauss maintained a low profile in retirement and rarely gave interviews relating to politics. However, in an interview with The Star in 1976, he professed his support for political reform and accepted majority rule in South Africa as inevitable. He died in obscurity in 1990. Nevertheless, his actions did contribute to the verligte split in the National Party, which had culminated in F. W. de Klerk's speech at the Opening of the Parliament of South Africa just one month earlier.

Political offices
Preceded by Jan Christiaan Smuts	Leader of the United Party; 1950 – 1956	Succeeded by De Villiers Graaff
