= Nico Malan =

South African attorney and politician

Johannes Nicholas Malan, better known as Nico Malan, was an attorney, politician and administrator of the Province of the Cape of Good Hope of South Africa from 1960 to 1970. He was born on 8 August 1903 in Fort Beaufort and died there in 1981. In 1968 he received the Freedom of the City of Kimberley.

A number of institutions were named in his honour including what is now known as the Artscape Theatre Centre in Cape Town and a high school in Humansdorp.
