= 1953 South African general election =

- 15 April 1953

All 156 general roll seats in the House of Assembly 79 seats needed for a majority
- Registered: 1,385,591
- Turnout: 87.95% (▲7.71pp)
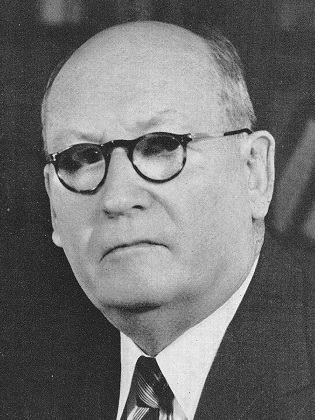

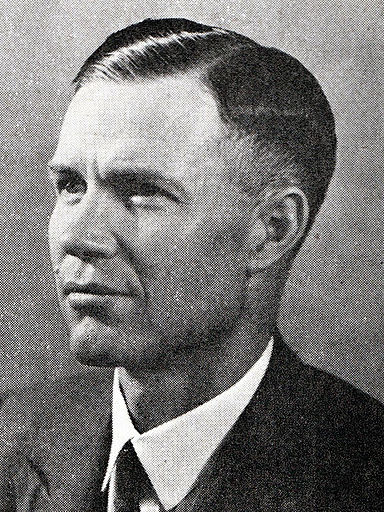
	First party	Second party	Third party
			Lab
Leader	D. F. Malan	Koos Strauss	John Christie
Party	National	United	Labour
Leader's seat	Piketberg	Germiston District	Johannesburg City (died before polling day)
Last election	41.63%, 79 seats (Note: Reunited National Party and Afrikaner Party combined.)	49.18%, 65 seats	2.57%, 6 seats
Seats won	94	57	5
Seat change	▲15	▼8	▼1
Popular vote	598,718	576,474	34,730
Percentage	49.48%	47.65%	2.87%
Swing	▲7.85pp	▼1.53pp	▲0.30pp
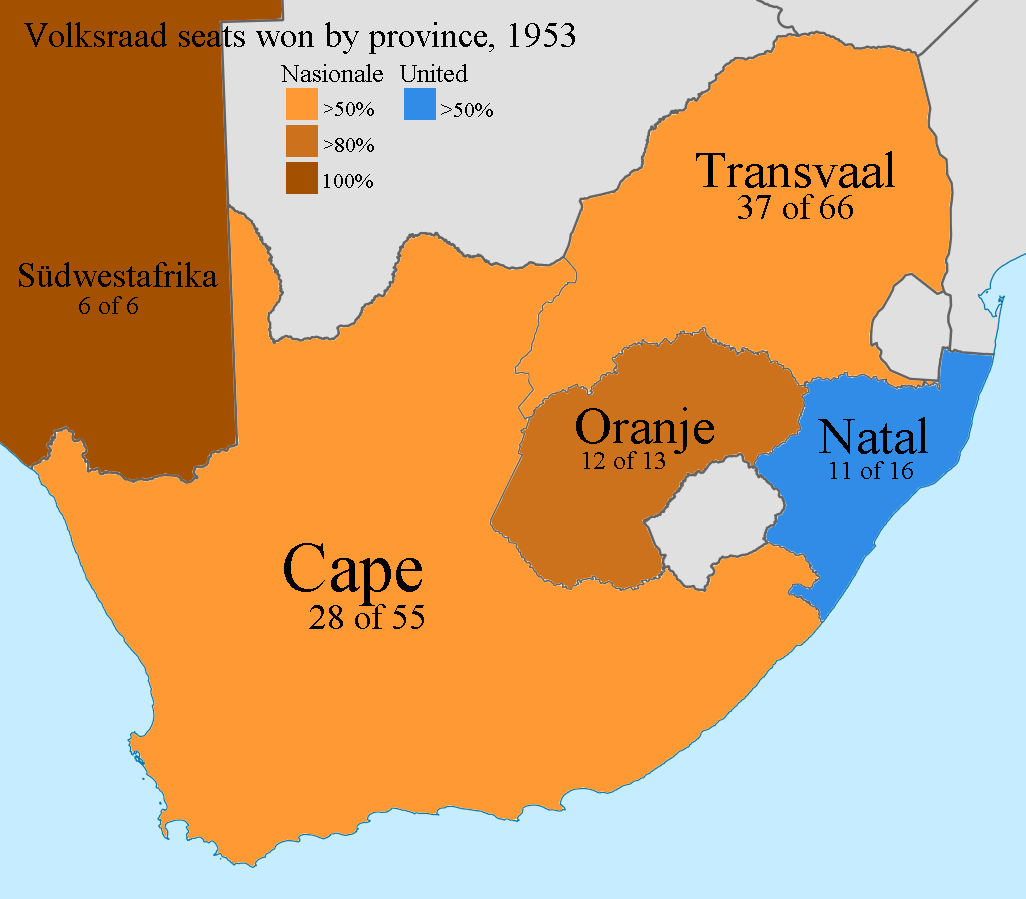
Prime Minister before election
D. F. Malan
National
Elected Prime Minister
D. F. Malan
National

General elections were held in South Africa on 15 April 1953. The elections consolidated the position of the National Party under D. F. Malan, which won an absolute majority of the 156 elected seats in the House of Assembly, also receiving the most votes. Its first-time majority of the white electorate would be retained until the 1989 elections.

The United Party under J. G. N. Strauss, who had become leader after Jan Smuts' death in 1950, lost several seats, and suffered several splits after the election. The Labour Party leader died five days before the election. Cape Coloured voters voted for the last time in a general election until 1994, overwhelmingly for the United Party.

== Changes in composition ==
=== Native representative members ===
The second term of the white MPs elected to represent black voters, from special electoral districts in Cape Province under the Representation of Natives Act 1936, expired on 30 June 1948 (just over a month after the National Party came to power in the 1948 general election). These seats were not vacated by a dissolution of Parliament, so they were not contested at either the 1948 or 1953 general elections.

The three representative seats were filled by elections on 17 November 1948. Two Independent MPs (W.H. Stuart of Transkeian Territories and Mrs V.M.L. Ballinger of Cape Eastern) were returned. The third seat was taken by Sam Kahn, a South African Communist Party member, who gained the seat from an Independent.

The term of these members expired on 30 June 1954 (the first 30 June to fall after five years from the date of election).

The Communist Party dissolved itself (at least as an open political party) when legislation to ban it was going through Parliament in 1950. Sam Kahn was ultimately banned from being a member of Parliament, in 1952, under the anti-Communist legislation. Subsequently, two successive by-elections were held in Cape Western, but the victors had similar views to Mr Kahn and were also excluded from Parliament. The seat was then left vacant for the remainder of the term.

=== South West Africa ===
The white electors of the territory of South West Africa (present day Namibia), were allocated six seats in the House of Assembly. These new electoral divisions were first filled at by-elections on 31 August 1950. The governing National Party won all the seats, which were additional to the 150 general roll seats allocated to the Union of South Africa.

== Delimitation of electoral divisions ==
The South Africa Act 1909 had provided for a delimitation commission to define the boundaries for each electoral division. The representation by province, under the tenth delimitation report of 1953, is set out in the table below. The figures in brackets are the number of electoral divisions in the previous (1947) delimitation. If there is no figure in brackets then the number was unchanged.

Provinces	Cape	Natal	Orange Free State	Transvaal	Total
Divisions	54 (55)	15 (16)	13	68 (66)	150

The above table does not include the three native representative seats in Cape Province nor the six South-West African divisions, which were not included in the delimitation of the general roll seats for the Union under the South Africa Act 1909.

== Position at the dissolution ==
At the end of the 10th Union Parliament, when it was dissolved in 1953, the House of Assembly consisted of two groups of members. General roll voters (white voters from the whole Union and South-West Africa and coloured electors in Cape Province and Natal) were represented by 156 members. Black voters in Cape Province were represented by three white MPs, known at the time as Native Representative Members (NRM).

The general election, on 15 April 1953, only affected the representatives of general roll voters. From 1938 the Native Representative Members had fixed terms and were elected on a different date. The overall composition of the House, set out by province before the general election, was as below.

Province	National	United	Labour	Independent	Total
Cape (general)	28	27	-	-	55
Cape (NRM)	-	-	-	3	3
Natal	3	11	2	-	16
Orange FS	12	1	-	-	13
SW Africa	6	-	-	-	6
Transvaal	37	25	4	-	66
Total	86	64	6	3	159

Abbreviations in the province list.

- Orange FS: Orange Free State
- SW Africa: South-West Africa
- NRM: Native Representative Members

Note: The NRM seat, formerly held by the Communist Party, is listed as Independent in the above table. Sam Kahn and his two successors, after the Communist Party dissolved its public organisation and went underground, all claimed to be Independents.

== Campaign ==
Since the 1948 general election Dr Malan's Reunited National Party had merged with its coalition partner, the Afrikaner Party. The merged party was named the National Party (NP). The government had also strengthened its political position, by conferring six parliamentary seats upon the white population of the territory of South West Africa.

The principal opposition party was the United Party (UP). Since the previous general election, in 1948, the UPs veteran leader Field Marshal Jan Smuts had died. The new Leader of the Opposition was J.G.N. Strauss.

The other parliamentary opposition party was the Labour Party. In 1953, the United Party and the Labour Party had an electoral pact, for the third successive general election.

During the campaign, the Labour leader John Christie died. His seat was consequently contested at a by election after the normal day of the general election poll. It was retained by a new Labour candidate and is included in the totals for the results section of this article,

The NP promoted its policy of apartheid Dr Malan suggested that the white voters could unite around the Nationalist programme. The UP criticised the idea of apartheid as impractical and eventually disastrous. Mr Strauss campaigned alleging that the first task of a South African government should be the suppression of "Native" crime, who created insecurity in the major cities. United Party supporters were optimistic on the eve of the poll of regaining their position as the largest party.

== Results ==
Due to the first-past-the-post system, the Nationalists won 37 more seats than United despite finishing only two percentage points ahead of United in the popular vote. As Cape Coloured voters still exercised this right in the Cape province, the majority among white voters would actually have been higher. This was enough to deliver the Nationalists a second consecutive majority government.

Party	Votes	%	Seats	+/–
National Party	598,718	49.48	94	+15
United Party	576,474	47.65	57	–8
Labour Party	34,730	2.87	5	–1
Native Representative Members			3	0
Total	1,209,922	100.00	159	+6
Valid votes	1,209,922	99.29		
Invalid/blank votes	8,709	0.71		
Total votes	1,218,631	100.00		
Registered voters/turnout	1,385,591	87.95		

=== By province ===
Province	National	United	Labour	Independent	Total
Cape (general)	30	24	0	0	54
Cape (NRM)	0	0	0	3	3
Natal	2	11	2	0	15
Orange FS	13	0	0	0	13
SW Africa	6	0	0	0	6
Transvaal	43	22	3	0	68
Total	94	57	5	3	159
Source: Keesings
