= Dimitri Tsafendas =

Assassin of South African Prime Minister Hendrik Verwoerd

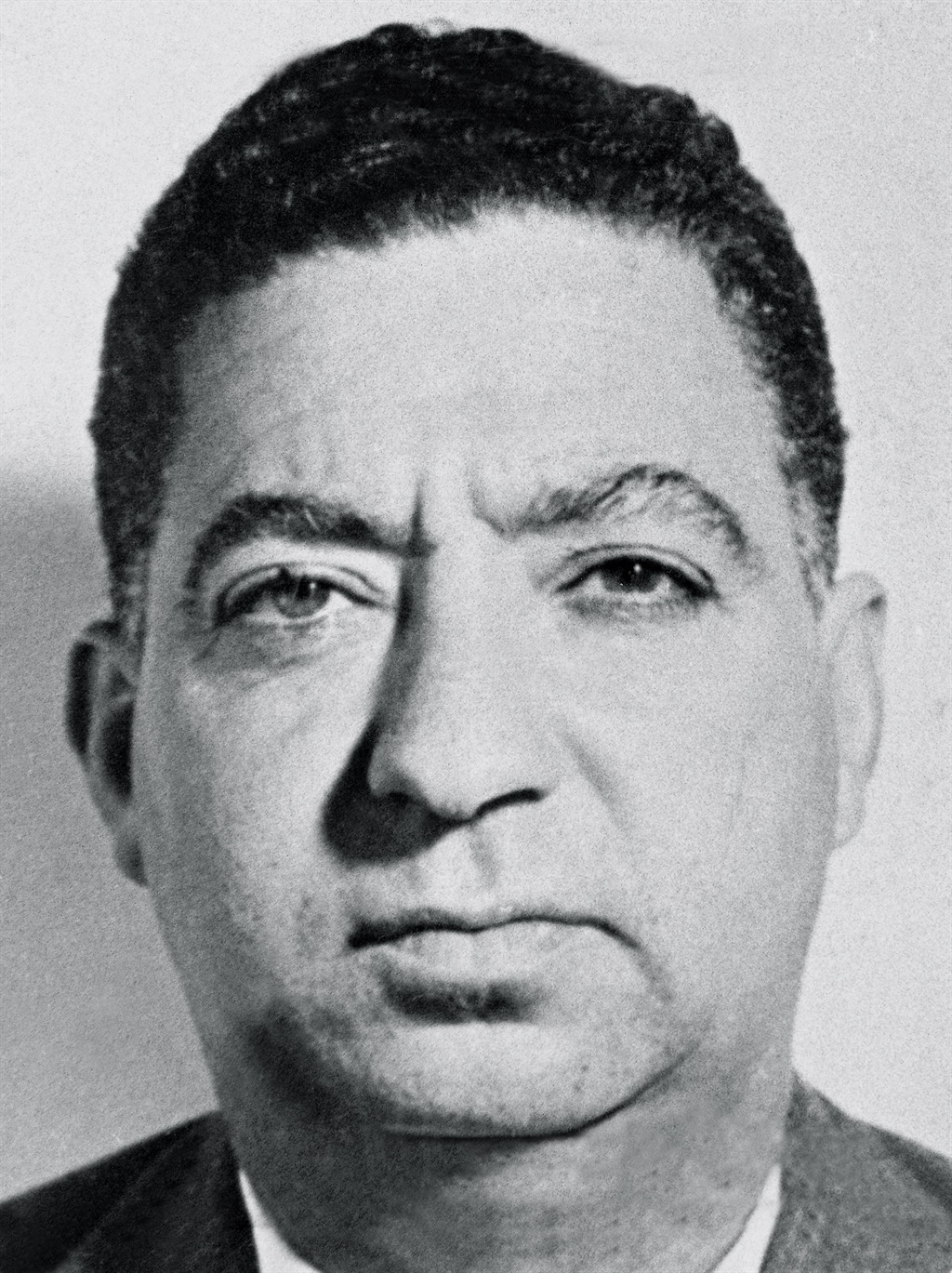
- Tsafendas in a 1966 mugshot
- Born: 14 January 1918; Lourenço Marques, Portuguese Mozambique
- Died: 7 October 1999 (aged 81); Krugersdorp, Gauteng, South Africa
- Known for: Assassination of South African Prime Minister Hendrik Verwoerd
- Political party: SACP
- Criminal charge: Murder
- Criminal penalty: Detained "at the pleasure of the State President"
- Criminal status: Not guilty by reason of insanity
- Military career
- Branch: United States Merchant Marine (1941–1945); Democratic Army of Greece (1947–1949)
- Conflicts: World War II; Greek Civil War

Dimitri Tsafendas (Greek: Δημήτρης Τσαφέντας; 14 January 1918 – 7 October 1999) was a Greek–Mozambican political militant and the assassin of Prime Minister of South Africa Hendrik Verwoerd. On 6 September 1966, while working as a parliamentary messenger, Tsafendas stabbed Verwoerd – commonly regarded as the architect of apartheid – to death during a sitting of the House of Assembly in Cape Town.

== Early life ==
Tsafendas was born in Lourenço Marques in Portuguese Mozambique. His parents were Michalis Tsafandakis (Greek: Μιχάλης Τσαφαντάκης, also spelled Miguel Tsafandakis), a Greek marine engineer with anarchist leanings from Kitharida, a small village near Heraklion, Crete, and Amelia Williams, a Mozambican woman of mixed race. He was sent to Egypt when he was three to live with his grandmother and his aunt. He returned to Mozambique four years later; then, at the age of ten, moved to Transvaal, where he attended Middelburg Primary School from 1928 to 1930. He then returned to Mozambique and attended a church school for the next two years.

Tsafendas was familiar with politics from an early age. Several members of his family were Cretan rebels during the Great Cretan Revolution (1866-1869), while his father was a passionate anarchist. At the age of 16, Tsafendas began to work at various jobs, and was dismissed from one of them "owing to his Communist leanings" and after he was suspected of being "engaged in disseminating Communistic propaganda." When he was 20, the Portuguese security police, PIDE, opened a file on Tsafendas after discovering that he had twice distributed Communist propaganda. In 1939, Tsafendas entered South Africa illegally and joined the South African Communist Party. He became a seaman in the US merchant marine in 1941 and served aboard American ships during World War II. While in the United States, Tsafendas became a member of a religious sect known as the Two by Twos.

In 1947, the US immigration authorities deported Tsafendas to Greece, then in the throes of the Greek Civil War. Tsafendas joined the Democratic Army, the military wing of the Greek Communist Party, and fought with them against the royalists. Shortly before the war ended in defeat for the Communists, Tsafendas made his way to Portugal. Upon his arrival, he was arrested and interrogated by the police about his political activities in Mozambique in 1938. He was imprisoned for nine months in the two most notorious Portuguese prisons for political offenders, the Barca d'Alva and the Aljube Prison. In October 1951, Tsafendas travelled by sea to Lourenço Marques, but was refused entry because of his past political activities and for being a known Communist, and was deported back to Portugal. Banned from entering South Africa, where his family had gone to live in the late 1930s, and Mozambique, Tsafendas spent the next 12 years of his life in exile. During these years, he applied at least once a year for permission to enter Mozambique or South Africa, but all his applications were refused because of his Communist status and his political activities in Mozambique in the 1930s. Constantly harassed in Portugal by PIDE and the Portuguese police, Tsafendas roamed across Europe and the Middle East, working and visiting places that interested him. During his wanderings, he picked up eight languages. While in Turkey in 1961, he worked for some six months as a teacher of English at the Limasollu Naci College, a prestigious private language institute in Istanbul, and upon eventually securing his return to South Africa, he worked for a time as a translator at Durban Court. In 1962, during a visit to Crete to see his father's and ancestors' birthplace, he met some former World War II Greek partisans who had participated in the kidnapping of German general Heinrich Kreipe. They trained him in bomb-making.

In 1963, Tsafendas was granted amnesty by Portugal after he convinced them that he was a reformed man and no longer a Communist, and he was eventually allowed to return to Mozambique. A year later, Tsafendas was arrested while addressing local people in favour of independence for the colonial territory. In a suitcase containing anti-colonialist and Communist literature, Tsafendas also had several Bibles. He told the police he was not advocating independence but preaching Christianity. The Portuguese were not convinced, and he was charged with "pretending to be a missionary spreading the word about religion" while actually preaching "under the guise of religion in favour of Mozambique's independence". According to PIDE's interrogation transcript, "When asked to describe all of the subversive activities that he has been developing against the Country and in favour of Mozambique's independence, he answered: That, he hasn't been developing any kind of such subversive activities against the Country, neither in favour of Mozambique's independence. However, wishes to clarify that he supports, as a Mozambican, the idea of Mozambique's independence, governed by the natives of that Province, whether they are black or white."

The Portuguese were not convinced that Tsafendas was telling the truth, and he was imprisoned. After three months in custody, Tsafendas claimed that he was in fact an apostle, Saint Peter. He was taken to a hospital, where he convinced the Portuguese doctors that he really believed he was Christ's foremost apostle and was therefore considered to be insane. He was released from prison custody and soon afterwards released from the hospital.

In 1965, Tsafendas returned to South Africa. Shortly before the assassination, he applied for reclassification from "White" to "Coloured" but his application was turned down.

== Verwoerd's assassination ==
In July 1966, at the age of 48, Tsafendas obtained a temporary position as a parliamentary messenger in the House of Assembly in Cape Town. When he first decided to take action against Verwoerd, Tsafendas planned to kidnap the prime minister. However, he soon realised that it would be impossible to do this on his own since his former comrades from the SACP were not keen on participating in anything risky or violent. With the access his new job permitted him, he decided instead to assassinate Verwoerd. He believed that since he had the opportunity to act he was morally obliged to do so, believing as he did that Verwoerd was "the brains behind apartheid" and that without him a change of policy would sooner or later take place. Years later, he told two priests who visited him in the hospital: "Every day, you see a man you know committing a very serious crime for which millions of people suffer. You cannot take him to court or report him to the police because he is the law in the country. Would you remain silent and let him continue with his crime or would you do something to stop him? You are guilty not only when you commit a crime, but also when you do nothing to prevent it when you have the chance."

Tsafendas's initial plan was to shoot Verwoerd, escape in the confusion, hide in the Eleni, a Greek tanker that was docked in Cape Town, and then sail away with it to freedom. Ultimately, his plan was to seek refuge in Communist Cuba. However, he had difficulty getting hold of a gun and with time running out and his temporary employment about to expire, he decided to use a knife to kill Verwoerd.

On 6 September, Prime Minister Verwoerd entered the debating chamber of Parliament and made his way to his seat. Tsafendas approached him, drew a concealed sheath knife from his belt, and stabbed Verwoerd about four times in the torso before he was pulled away by other members of parliament. He had made no plan for escape and was easily apprehended. He was taken into police custody, where he was severely beaten, and then moved to a hospital where he was treated for his injuries and interviewed by a psychiatrist. Later, he was returned to jail pending trial.

== Reaction and police investigation ==
After the assassination, some leaders in the anti-apartheid movement distanced themselves from any association with Tsafendas. However, others like Johnny Makatini, leader of the ANC in Algiers, hailed the assassination as "the beginning of the end for apartheid" and said it would "help the morale of guerrilla fighters in South Africa (and) increase confusion among whites". Also in Algiers, Joshua Nkomo, the representative of the Zimbabwe African People's Union (ZAPU), said that "the attack ... proved the vulnerability of this fascist empire" and Uazuvara Ewald Katjivena, representative of the South West African People's Organization (SWAPO), declared that "the fascist Dr. Verwoerd got what he deserved". Kenya's Minister of Defence, Njoroge Mungai, said when he first heard about the stabbing, "I hope it is successful. It would be a good thing", and the ruling Kenya African National Union declared that force would be the ultimate method of overthrowing apartheid and characterised the assassination as "a symbolic and heartening act, from which millions suffering from apartheid would draw hope". People in Nigeria and Uganda danced in the streets with joy when they heard the news of the assassination.

The majority of the African press applauded the assassination. For example, the Algerian-French magazine Revolution Africaine applauded the assassination of "the apostle of hatred", and said, "The most hated man of Africa is no more", in Ethiopia, a banner headline in the New Times of Addis Ababa said, "The Sharpeville butcher stabbed to death", while Cairo's Al Akhbar newspaper said Egypt had "no tears to shed" for Verwoerd.

In contrast, fearing reprisals, Tsafendas' family and the Greek community in South Africa turned their backs on him.

Throughout his time in custody Tsafendas was subjected to severe torture from beatings, electric shocks, mock hangings and pretended defenestrations. During his interrogation, Tsafendas gave incontestable political reasons for killing Verwoerd: "I did believe that with the disappearance of the South African prime minister a change of policy would take place. I did set myself the task of destroying the prime minister. It was my own idea to kill him. No one offered me any reward for doing so. I did not care about the consequences, for what would happen to me afterwards. I was so disgusted with the racial policy that I went through with my plans to kill the prime minister. ... I wanted to see a government representing all the South African people. I do not think the Nationalist government is representative of the people and I wanted to see a different government".

At the same time, the Portuguese security police, embarrassed that Tsafendas, a Portuguese citizen with a long history of political activism in Mozambique who had also fooled them into granting him amnesty by pretending he was no longer a communist and or an anti-colonialist, had assassinated Verwoerd, moved quickly to hide their discomfort. Two days after the assassination, the Chief Inspector of PIDE in Lisbon instructed his counterparts in Mozambique not to give the South African authorities "any information indicating Tsafendas as a partisan for the independence of your province [country]". The PIDE in Mozambique thus lied and misled the South African police as to Tsafendas's past political activities.

Despite PIDE's efforts, the South African police investigation, led by the notorious General Hendrik van den Bergh, revealed that Tsafendas was a highly intelligent man, well versed in politics, well read, with deep political convictions and a lifelong history of activism who considered Verwoerd to be a dictator and a tyrant. Tsafendas had characterised Verwoerd as "Hitler's best student", as he believed the South African Prime Minister had copied some of Hitler's Nuremberg Laws and applied them to the blacks in his country. Tsafendas had also been banned from entering South Africa due to his political activities and beliefs; the South African security police held four files on him.

A year before the assassination, two people had reported Tsafendas to the South African police as a dangerous communist, and one of them had even characterised him as "the biggest communist in the Republic of South Africa." Edward Furness, a South African who had met Tsafendas in London, told the police that Tsafendas closely associated with prominent members of the anti-apartheid movement in London and that he had admitted to him that he wanted "to create a resistance to the regime of South Africa" and that he was willing to do "anything that would get the South African regime out of power". Evidence was also submitted to the Commission of Enquiry into Verwoerd's death that in London, Tsafendas had attempted to "recruit people to take part in an uprising in South Africa." None of those documents, along with anything that had to do with Tsafendas's political ideas and activism, was allowed to see the light of day.

== Trial ==
At his trial, Judge Andrew Beyers declared Tsafendas not guilty of murder by reason of insanity. He had been diagnosed with schizophrenia and it was claimed by police and his defence that he had said that he had a giant tapeworm inside him, which affected his life. The court ordered for him to be detained "at the pleasure of the State President", which meant that only the State President (later President) had the authority to order his release. He was never discharged.

However, the diagnosis of mental illness has since been dismissed by several forensic psychiatrists. Those who examined Tsafendas during the trial based their diagnoses entirely on what Tsafendas told them and had no access to any other information about him: his medical and criminal records and statements by people who knew him. Thus, they formed their opinions after they had each spent four-and-a-half hours with only Tsafendas, took for granted what he told them and had no way of double-checking it.

During the trial, no mention was made of Tsafendas's political activism, real political ideas or his motive for killing Verwoerd, though they had clearly been expressed by him to the police. The fact that he had given lucid political reasons for killing Verwoerd in his two statements to the police, with no reference to the tapeworm, was concealed at the trial. The Attorney General lied, withheld and manipulated evidence to portray Tsafendas as an apolitical person with schizophrenia who had killed Verwoerd for no political reason. A subsequent Commission of Enquiry into the assassination also withheld and manipulated evidence, which was clearly to portray Tsafendas as he had been presented in court.

== Imprisonment ==
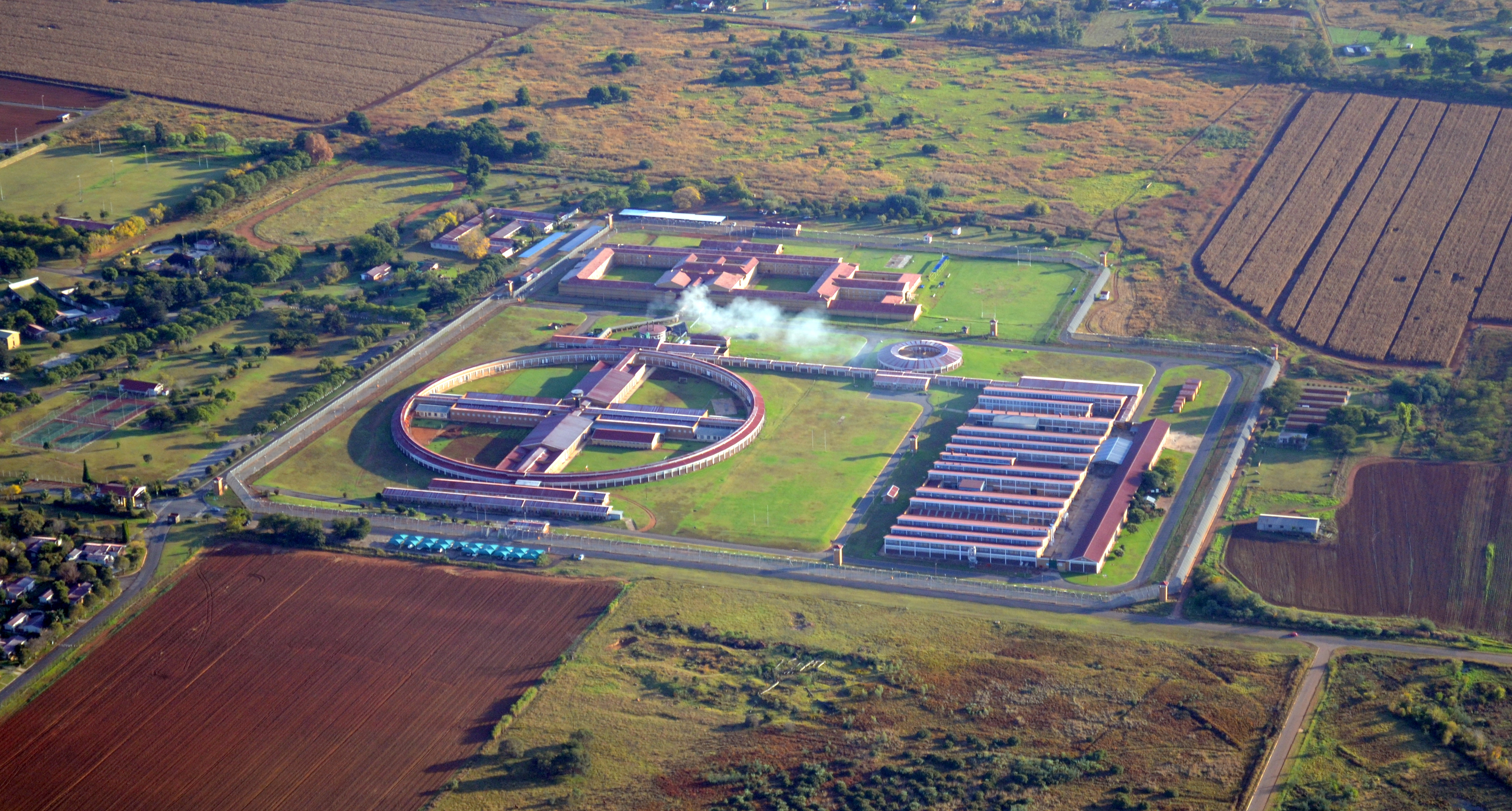
Zonderwater Prison

Tsafendas was initially held on Robben Island, then after four months was transferred to Pretoria Central Prison. There he occupied a cell on death row that was specially built for him next to the execution chamber where men were hanged. Tsafendas was subjected to some form of inhuman and cruel torture for most of his imprisonment. In 1989, he was transferred to Zonderwater Prison near Cullinan. In 1994, after the collapse of apartheid, Tsafendas was visited in prison by two Greek Orthodox priests he knew. Tsafendas told them that he killed Verwoerd for being "a dictator and a tyrant who oppressed his people." Tsafendas said: "Every day, you see a man you know committing a very serious crime for which millions of people suffer. You cannot take him to court or report him to the police, because he is the law in the country. Would you remain silent and let him continue with his crime, or would you do something to stop him?"

In 1994, he was transferred again, this time to Sterkfontein psychiatric hospital outside Krugersdorp. In 1999, South African filmmaker Liza Key was allowed to conduct two televised interviews with him, for a documentary called A Question of Madness in which she raised the suggestion that Tsafendas's act was not mindless but politically motivated.

== Death ==
Tsafendas died of pneumonia in October 1999, aged 81, 33 years after the assassination. At the time of his death, he was not regarded as a hero in anti-apartheid circles, which sent no members to attend his funeral. The funeral was held according to Greek Orthodox rites, and he was buried in an unmarked grave outside Sterkfontein Hospital. Fewer than ten people attended the service.

== Report to the Minister of Justice regarding Verwoerd's assassination ==
On 23 April 2018, a document titled "Report to the Minister of Justice, advocate Tshilio Michael Masutha, in the Matter of Dr Verwoerd's Assassination" was submitted to the Minister of Justice of South Africa Michael Masutha by Judge Jody Kollapen. The report was written by Harris Dousemetzis, a tutor at Durham University, England, and consisted of three hardback volumes totalling 2,192 pages and 861,803 words. It was accompanied by a 16GB USB that contained all the evidence gathered by the author for this research, including about 12,000 pages of documents located in the National Archives of South Africa, Portugal and the United Kingdom, 137 interviews, including 69 with people who knew Tsafendas personally, some of them well and even as a child, as well as thousands of newspaper articles.

Dousemetzis collaborated closely in his research and the evaluation of the evidence with Advocate George Bizos, Professor John Dugard, former KwaZulu-Natal state attorney Krish Govender, Advocate Dumisa Ntsebeza and former Judge Zak Yacoob, while he also consulted Professor Alban Burke, Head of the Department of Psychology at the University of Johannesburg; Professor Kirk Heilbrun, forensic psychologist and Professor of Psychology at Drexel University in Philadelphia, Pennsylvania; Professor Phillip Resnick, forensic psychiatrist and Professor of Psychiatry and Director of the Division of Forensic Psychiatry at Case Western Reserve University School of Medicine in Cleveland, Ohio; Professor Robert L. Sadoff, clinical Professor of Psychiatry and Director of the Center for Studies in Social-Legal Psychiatry at the University of Pennsylvania, and former president of the American Academy of Psychiatry and the Law, as well as of the American Board of Forensic Psychiatry, and Professor Tuviah Zabow, forensic psychiatrist, former head of the forensic psychiatry unit at Valkenberg Hospital and former professor of psychiatry at the University of Cape Town.

The report and the evidence were supported by a joint letter from Bizos, Dugard, Govender, Ntsebeza and Yacoob. They wrote that the new evidence:

shows convincingly that Mr Tsafendas was not a schizophrenic who believed that his actions were determined by a tapeworm. In fact, the study compellingly demonstrates that he was a man with a deep social conscience who was bitterly opposed to apartheid and viewed Verwoerd as the prime architect of this policy. Tsafendas told the police after the assassination that he killed Dr Verwoerd because he was 'disgusted with his racial policies' and hoped that 'a change of policy would take place'. The killing of Verwoerd was therefore a political assassination and not the act of an insane man.

The five jurists concluded in their letter that:

South African history, in proper recognition of the generations who preceded us as well as those to come, should record in its annals an accurate account of the killing of Dr Verwoerd which recognises that Tsafendas was motivated to kill him by reason of his deep opposition to apartheid and was indeed a freedom fighter and a hero. This must be acknowledged by a revision and a correction of this event in history. This is necessary in order that what occurred is properly recorded and that the distortion of it by the apartheid government is laid bare. It is not about being vindictive or vengeful but simply about recording our painful history with the accuracy that our commitment to the truth and reconciliation requires.

Advocate George Bizos characterised the report as "monumental" and described it as "the most comprehensive study of apartheid and how it operated that I have ever seen". He expressed his belief that the report is "of major historical importance for South Africa and as to our understanding of Verwoerd's assassination". Advocate Bizos described the evidence gathered and presented by the report, proving that Tsafendas was not insane but politically motivated in killing Verwoerd, as "overwhelming and unquestionable".

Professor John Dugard stated of the report that it "confirms that there was a cover-up. It shows convincingly that Tsafendas was a political revolutionary, whose assassination of Dr Verwoerd was motivated by a hatred of Dr Verwoerd and all he stood for. He was not an insane killer but a political assassin determined to rid South Africa of the architect of apartheid. Political assassinations seldom achieve their goal and this was no exception. But at least South African history should know the truth about Tsafendas. Dousemetzis has done South Africa a service by correcting the historical record".

Justice Zak Yacoob said he agreed "100 per cent" with all of the report's findings and added: "The historical record shows that comrade Tsafendas killed Verwoerd, that he pleaded insanity at the trial, his plea was upheld and he was, consequent to his plea, confined at the pleasure of the relevant authority. If he had spoken the truth, he would have been sentenced to death, so the tactic was a very good one in the circumstances. History does not record that he pretended to be insane to save his life. This is well brought out in the research. The research shows conclusively that he did a deliberate courageous anti-apartheid act but pretended insanity at the trial; understandably so. I think the research speaks for itself."

On 24 April 2018, Solly Mapaila, First Deputy General Secretary of the South African Communist Party, made a similar request to the Minister of Justice on behalf of his Party: "We hereby request that the Minister assesses and considers the new evidence, based on research by Mr Harris Dousemetzis, on the assassination of Prime Minister Hendrik Verwoerd and that the act be classified as politically motivated".

== In popular culture ==
In 1976, Bill Turner wrote and staged in England and South Africa a play simply titled Tsafendas.

In 1998, Dutch author Henk van Woerden, who visited Tsafendas in hospital towards the end of Tsafendas's life, published the award-winning memoir, A Mouthful of Glass.

An award-winning play entitled Living in Strange Lands by Anton Krueger was presented to South African audiences in 2002.

A London production entitled I.D. was written by the noted Shakespearean actor Antony Sher, who lived in Cape Town at the time of the incident. I.D. premiered at the Almeida Theatre in London in 2003, followed by an American debut in 2005.

Tsafendas's life story and his assassination of Hendrik Verwoerd are briefly mentioned in the book The Girl Who Saved the King of Sweden by Jonas Jonasson, published in 2012.

In November 2018, The Man Who Killed Apartheid: The Life of Dimitri Tsafendas by Harris Dousemetzis and Gerry Loughran was published in South Africa. Justice and Correctional Services Minister Michael Masutha described the book's launch as "a moment to celebrate the truth" about Tsafendas.

== See also ==
- David Pratt, responsible for an earlier assassination attempt against Verwoerd in 1960
