= Cleo Sylvestre =

British actress (1945–2024)

Cleo Sylvestre MBE
- Sylvestre in 2020
- Born: Cleopatra Mary Sylvestre; 19 April 1945; Hitchin, Hertfordshire, England
- Died: 20 September 2024 (aged 79)
- Other name: Cleopatra Mary Palmer
- Education: Italia Conti Academy of Theatre Arts
- Occupation: Actress
- Spouse: Ian Palmer (m. 1977; died 1995)
- Children: 3

Cleopatra Mary Palmer (née Sylvestre; 19 April 1945 – 20 September 2024), known professionally as Cleo Sylvestre or Honey B. Mama, was a British actress and singer. She was the first black woman ever to play a leading role at the National Theatre in London, and the first woman to record with The Rolling Stones.

== Life and career ==
Sylvestre was brought up in Euston, north London, by her mother, Laureen Sylvestre (née Goodare), a cabaret artist at the Shim Sham Club in Wardour Street, who was born in Yorkshire in 1911. Laureen was of mixed English and 'probabl[e] African' heritage, and married Owen Oscar Sylvestre, from Trinidad, in 1944. Owen was a Flight Sergeant in the Air Force and had been awarded the Distinguished Flying Medal; he and Laureen divorced in 1955. Sylvestre always understood Owen to be her father; her daughter Zoë discovered many years later - whilst working in Sierra Leone - that her biological father was Ben Lewis, a lawyer from Sierra Leone whom the family called Uncle Ben, and that she had 15 half-siblings. Aged eight, she made her film debut in Johnny on the Run.

Sylvestre was educated at Camden School for Girls and also attended the Italia Conti Academy of Theatre Arts. In 1964 she released a single, "To Know Him Is to Love Him", under the name "Cleo", produced by Andrew Loog Oldham and backed by The Rolling Stones. After Brian Jones left the Rolling Stones in 1969, she agreed to rehearse with his new band but temporarily abandoned music to concentrate on her theatre and television work.

Her West End debut was at Wyndham's Theatre in Wise Child (1967) by Simon Gray, in which she starred alongside Sir Alec Guinness and was nominated most promising new actress. She was the first black actress in a leading role at the National Theatre in The National Health (1969) by Peter Nichols. She did several seasons with the Young Vic Company, including Molière's Les Fourberies de Scapin on Broadway and a tour of Mexico. She subsequently worked in many regional theatres, including the Theatre Royal, Lincoln, the Theatre Royal, Brighton, the Theatre Royal, York, the Derby Playhouse and the Belgrade Theatre, Coventry. She played Phaedre at the Edinburgh Fringe in 2007 and Rosa Parks, Josephine Baker and Wangari Maathai in Alison Mead's A Century of Women at Leicester Square Theatre (2011). She appeared with Antony Sher in his play ID (2003) at the Almeida Theatre, toured with English Touring Theatre in Far from the Madding Crowd (2008) and with Northern Broadsides in its 2010 production of Medea. She also appeared with Michael Sheen in Under Milk Wood (2021) at the Royal National Theatre. Children's theatre work includes seasons at the Unicorn Theatre and the London Bubble Theatre Company.

Her television appearances include: Ken Loach's Up the Junction (1965), Doctor Who (1965), Cathy Come Home (1966) and Poor Cow (1967), as well as appearances in the original Till Death Us Do Part, Z-Cars, Callan, Doctors, New Tricks, The Armando Iannucci Shows, Chambers, The Bill, Who Do You Do and A Bird in the Hand, a Tube Tales episode directed by Jude Law. After a brief appearance as a factory worker in soap opera Coronation Street in 1966, she became the first ever regular black British female character on British TV, in the original series of Crossroads, playing Meg Richardson's adopted daughter Melanie from 1970 to 1972. She was also a regular in Grange Hill, Happy Families and presented Play School and Merry-Go-Round. In 2020 she played Anne Chapman in All Creatures Great and Small, a role she returned to in 2023.

Her film credits include Till Death Us Do Part (1969), The Smashing Bird I Used to Know (1969), Trog (1970), My Lover My Son (1970), The Alf Garnett Saga (1972), Sammy and Rosie Get Laid (1987), The Love Child (1988), The Punk and the Princess (2003), Kidulthood (2006) and Paddington (2014), and she made several shorts with director Isaac Julien, including The Attendant (1992) and Vagabondia (2000), which was shortlisted for that year's Turner Prize.

For twenty years until 2016, she was joint Artistic Director of the award-winning Rosemary Branch Theatre with Cecilia Darker, where she regularly performed live music. She was also an Ambassador for the Mary Seacole Memorial Statue Appeal (MSMA). In April 2019 she was awarded Screen Nation's Trailblazer Award.

Her acclaimed one-woman show, The Marvellous Adventure of Mary Seacole, was performed at numerous venues, including the House of Lords, the National Portrait Gallery, London, the Mercury Theatre, Colchester, the Mill Studio at the Yvonne Arnaud Theatre, Guildford, and the Edinburgh Festival.

She also reviewed for The Listener magazine and the Times Educational Supplement and contributed a chapter to Theatre in a Cool Climate (Amber Lane Press, 1999). A former council member of Equity, the British actors' union, she was on the board of the Young Vic, Hoxton Hall, Quicksilver Theatre for Children and the Free Form Arts Trust, as well as a judge for the Race in the Media Awards (RIMA) and Croydon Warehouse Theatre's International Playwriting Competition.

In the early 2010s, Sylvestre started performing music again under the monicker Honey B. Mama. Her band regularly toured the UK and Europe.

Sylvestre was the inspiration for the character of Honey in the Gaspard the Fox series of children's books by Zeb Soanes, illustrated by James Mayhew, first appearing in Gaspard: Best in Show (Graffeg, 2019). Writing in 2020, Soanes said: 'I can’t remember when I realised that my friend Cleo was exactly the character I was looking for but it was a 'lightbulb' moment. Cleo has been a trailblazer throughout her career [...] and it's a real pleasure to be able to pay tribute to her.'

Sylvestre was appointed Member of the Order of the British Empire (MBE) in the 2023 New Year Honours for services to drama and charity.

In August 2024 Sylvestre appeared on BBC's Antiques Roadshow, with treasured mementos from her early career, including a hand-made Christmas card from Jimmy Page.

== Personal life and death ==
Her godparents were composer Constant Lambert, Labour peer Tom Driberg and Daria Hambourg (daughter of the pianist Mark Hambourg). Sylvestre was married to Ian Palmer from 1977 until his death in 1995. They had three children, Zoë, Lucy and Rupert. Sylvestre died on 20 September 2024, at the age of 79.

== Selected bibliography ==
=== Theatre ===
- Cleo Sylvestre, The Marvellous Adventures of Mary Seacole, Aurora Metro Books, London, 2021
- Stephen Bourne, Trailblazers of Black British Theatre - From Ira Aldridge to Cleo Laine, The History Press, Cheltenham, 2025

== Selected discography ==
- To Know Him Is To Love Him/There Are But Five Rolling Stones, Decca, 1964
