= Primo (film) =

2005 television film

Primo is a 2005 film directed by Richard Wilson, starring the BAFTA-nominated Antony Sher and broadcast by HBO and the BBC.

This film is a recording of the Royal National Theatre production of the play Primo, also directed by Wilson. Adapted by Antony Sher from If This Is a Man, also known as Survival in Auschwitz (1947) by Primo Levi, it is a monologue told as a memoir by an older Primo looking back at his life in Auschwitz.

Set designer Hildegard Bechtler devised a symbolist set consisting of a single bare wall and a lone chair with variations in lighting.

British composer, Jonathan Goldstein, was nominated for an Ivor Novelllo award for the score to the film.

Wilson and Sher travelled to Auschwitz whilst researching the play. Sher was confined in the back of a lorry and German actors were hired to shout out orders to him in order to give him some feel of the powerlessness and confusion Levi experienced during his incarceration. Sher said that he found the play terribly draining; he refused to extend the play or to tour with it.
