= I.D. (play) =

Play written by Antony Sher

I.D. is a historical drama by Antony Sher. It debuted on 4 September 2003 at London's Almeida Theatre, directed by Nancy Meckler.

The play is adapted from the book A Mouthful of Glass by Henk van Woerden, and follows the events surrounding the trial and imprisonment of the mentally unstable Demetrios Tsafendas, who in 1966 assassinated South African Prime Minister Hendrik Verwoerd.

== Original cast ==
The original cast included:

- Jon Cartwright as Gavronsky, Buytendag, Gomez
- Jonathan Duff as Pratt, Muller, Dr. Fisher
- Alex Ferns as Lintwurm
- Paul Herzberg as John Vorster, Kriel
- Peter Landi as Father Daniels, Manolis
- Lucian Msamati as Sipho
- Oscar Pierce as City Gent, Schalk, Nikki, Junior Clerk
- Antony Sher as Demetrios Tsafendas
- Cleo Sylvestre as Helen Daniels, Daisy
- Christopher Wells as Frank Waring, Judge Pienaar
- Marius Weyers as Hendrik Verwoerd
- Jennifer Woodburne as Betsie Verwoerd

== Other original production credits ==
- Author: Antony Sher
- Director: Nancy Meckler
- Composer: Ilona Sekacz
- Set Design: Katrina Lindsay
- Lighting: Johanna Town
- Choreographer: Scarlett Mackmin
- Sound: John Leonard
- South Africa Music Consultant: Sello Maake ka Ncube

== Other productions ==
I.D. had its New Zealand premiere at BATS Theatre in Wellington on 4 October 2005, starring Malcolm Murray as Tsafendas, Benjamin Fransham as Verwoerd and Alex Greig as Lintwurm. The cast also included Erin Banks, Miria George, Salesi Le'ota, Hadleigh Walker, James Stewart and Tony Hopkins. It was produced by The Bacchanals and directed by David Lawrence. At the 2005 Chapman Tripp Theatre Awards I.D. won the awards for Production of the Year, Director of the Year, Actor of the Year (Malcolm Murray) and Supporting Actor of the Year (Alex Greig).
