= Rosemary Branch Theatre =

Pub theatre in Islington, London

Coordinates: 51°32′15″N 0°5′13″W

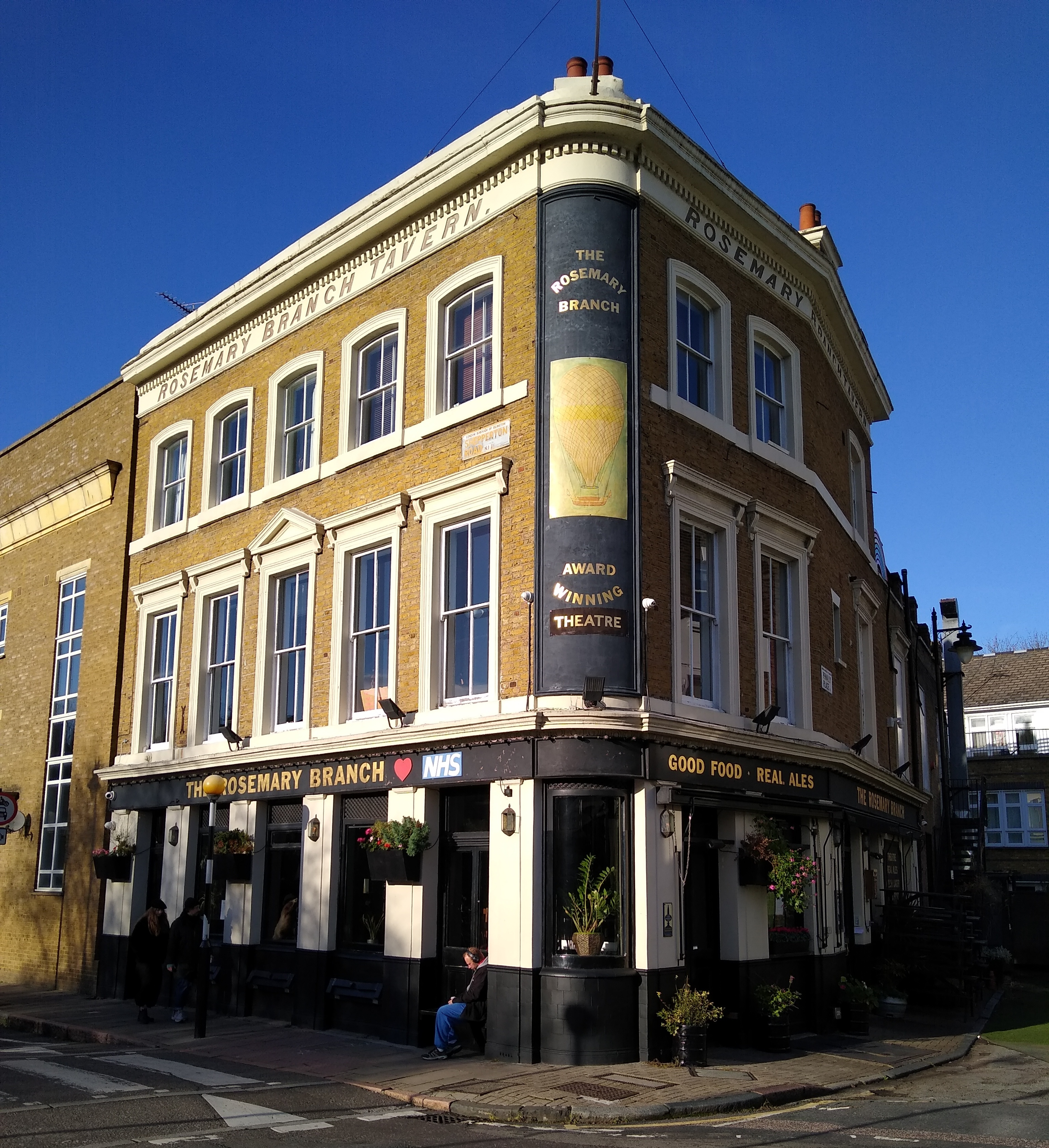
- Rosemary Branch
- Interactive map of Rosemary Branch Theatre
- Address: 2 Shepperton Road, London, N1 3DT
- Capacity: circa 60 seats

Website
- www.rosemarybranchtheatre.co.uk

The Rosemary Branch Theatre is a pub theatre located in Islington, London. It has been operating for 35 years. It was originally known as the Rosemary Theatre in 1986. In late spring of 1986 the upstairs of the Rosemary Branch was converted into a theatre.

The same space has always been used, but the technical area was originally between the stage left entrance corridor and the central aisle just adjacent to the entrance.

== History ==
The first production, starring Mark Heath and directed by James Marcus (from London's Burning and others) was "Napoleon Noir", describing the heroic feats of Toussaint L'Ouverture, who in the late 18th century fought to abolish slavery in Saint-Domingue. The next play was the well-received dark comedy "Curtains" by Tom Mallin. This had its premiere at the Edinburgh Festival in 1970 with Nigel Hawthorne as one of a couple made murderous by the introduction of a third party. Lastly, before the Theatre's initial season closed, Cavada Humphrey presented her autobiographical solo performance "Walking Papers"; a powerful and focused work. The building was previously a Victorian music hall.

From 1996 to 2016 it was co-directed by Cleo Sylvestre MBE and Cecilia Darker. From 2016 until 2020 (when London theatres closed due to lockdowns as a result of COVID-19) the theatre was run by the organisation Unattended Items. It has been under the artistic direction of Laura Killeen since 2021.

== Awards won ==
- The People's Winner (2017), The Offies
- Best Fringe Theatre Award (2010), Fringe Report
- Best Neighbourhood Theatre Silver Award, Smooth FM
- Most Welcoming Theatre (2013 & 2016) Offies
