= Dan Jacobson =

South African writer (1929–2014)

- Born: 7 March 1929; Johannesburg, South Africa
- Died: 12 June 2014 (aged 85); Lyndhurst Gardens, Hampstead, London, England, United Kingdom
- Occupation: Novelist

Dan Jacobson (7 March 1929 – 12 June 2014) was a South African novelist, short story writer, critic and essayist of Lithuanian Jewish descent.

== Early life and career ==
Dan Jacobson was born 7 March 1929, in Johannesburg, South Africa, where his parents' families had come to avoid the persecution of Jews and to escape poverty in their European homelands. His father, Hyman Michael Jacobson, was born in Ilūkste, Latvia, in 1885. His mother, Liebe (Melamed) Jacobson, was born in Kelme, Lithuania, in 1895. Jacobson had two older brothers, Israel Joshua and Hirsh, and a younger sister, Aviva. His mother's family emigrated to South Africa in 1920, after the death of his grandfather. His grandfather, Heshel Melamed, was a rabbi, and refused to leave Lithuania after traveling to the United States and finding that many Jews were not following their religion. Jacobson later wrote in his memoir Heshel's Kingdom about his travels back to Lithuania to find out more information about his grandfather.

When Dan was four, the family moved from Johannesburg to Kimberley, which was then under British control. The city had once been a huge diamond mining center, but the mines had closed and the town was in decline. However, the De Beers Consolidated Mines Company continued to have great influence. He attended a public school and learned English. During his childhood, he became aware of the ways that different people were treated based on their race, religion, economic status, and social status. In his autobiography Time and Time Again, he refers to the many classes of people in his community: "The Africans lived either in rooms in the back yards of their employers' houses or in sprawling, dusty, tatterdemalion 'locations'; the Cape Coloureds (South African name for people of mixed race) lived in their parts of town; the whites in theirs. Interspersed among these groups were smaller communities: Indians and Chinese among the non-whites, Jews and Greeks among the whites. As for the major division among the whites themselves, that between English-speaking and Afrikaans-speaking, or Briton and Boer.… All these peoples met in the streets, they did business with one another, but just about every aspect of their social life was severely segregated. To sit together in the same room with anyone of a darker skin than their own was a moral impossibility for most whites." He later recalled that many of his Jewish friends and acquaintances sympathized with the blacks in South Africa. He began to observe the ways that the government, churches, and the newspapers justified the ill treatment of blacks.

At the age of 11, an event occurred that affected Jacobson for the rest of his life. After helping a boy rescue his book bag from a filthy trash bin, he went to school unaware that he had gotten dirt on the back of his legs. When his teacher mentioned the dirt in front of the class, several of the boys made fun of him and led the class in ignoring him for six to eight weeks. He was stunned at the mob mentality, seeing how a few leaders of the class could control the actions of the entire group. Paul Gready writes in Research in African Literatures: "A childhood experience of bullying and ostracism was something from which Jacobson was 'never to wholly recover."'

The Jewish community in Kimberley was a strong one. More Lithuanian Jews traveled to South Africa in the early 20th century than to any other country except the United States. Many were hoping to follow in the footsteps of Sammy Marks, a Lithuanian who had made his fortune in the diamond mines. The Jewish community grew even closer together in the 1930s as Nazism rose, and they felt connected to Jews around the world. Jacobson's parents were not particularly religious, but his father insisted that the children attend synagogue and Hebrew lessons, because, as Jacobson later wrote, "To have done less, especially as the Nazi madness swept across Europe, would have seemed to him spineless, even treacherous." Jacobson attended, but usually under protest. Jacobson attended Boys' High School in Kimberley and graduated at the age of 16. He went on to the University of Witwatersrand in Johannesburg, where he graduated at the top of his class with a bachelor's degree in English Literature. Following his graduation in 1948, he worked as a laborer in an Israeli kibbutz for about a year. Then he got a job as a teacher at a Jewish school in London. In less than a year, he was asked to leave, according to a published memoir, because he told the pupils about evolution, thereby contradicting the teachings of Orthodox Judaism.

He returned to Johannesburg in 1951 and worked for the South African Jewish Board of Deputies as a public relations assistant and then as a journalist for Press Digest. In 1952 he returned to Kimberley to work as a correspondence secretary on his father's cattle farm. During this period he became determined to be a writer. His first literary success occurred with a short story entitled "The Box", which was published in Commentary. It was followed by other short stories in Harpers Bazaar, The New Yorker, and other magazines.

In February 1954, he married Margaret Pye, whom he had met while working in London.

His first novel, The Trap, was released in 1955, followed by A Dance in the Sun in 1956. Both books draw upon his childhood experiences. Together the two books earned him a yearlong creative writing fellowship at Stanford University in California. During his time at Stanford, he completed his third novel, The Price of Diamonds, which was also set in South Africa but was a lighthearted comedy–mystery with a moral message. All three books dealt with prejudice and racism. He returned to England in 1957, determined to seek greater depth in his writing. In 1959, he received the John Llewelyn Rhys Award for fiction for his collection of short stories, A Long Way from London. In 1960, The Evidence of Love was published. It dealt with the racism involved in a romantic relationship between a black man and a white woman who were put in prison for getting married. In 1964, he received the W. Somerset Maugham Award for his first collection of essays, Time of Arrival. One of his short stories, "The Zulu and the Zeide", was adapted into a musical and produced on Broadway in 1965. In 1966, he published The Beginners, a longer, in-depth novel following the lives of a Jewish family after their emigration to South Africa. It was a great literary success.

Over the next two decades, he continued to write while holding various teaching positions. In 1965–66, he was visiting professor at Syracuse University in New York. A Dance in the Sun, his second novel, was produced as the play Day of the Lion in Cleveland in 1968. He was a visiting fellow at the State University of New York at Buffalo in the summer of 1971. In 1974, he became vice chair of the Literature Panel of the Arts Council of Great Britain. In 1981, he was a Fellow at the Humanities Research Centre at Australian National University. He also took a position at the University of London as a lecturer; from 1979 to 1987 he was a reader in English. In 1988, he became a professor of English, a position he would hold until his retirement in 1994.

Jacobson's first five novels all focused on South Africa. His writing focus then shifted to moral and ethical issues involving all of humanity. Although he had no interest in learning the Bible as a child, he developed a strong interest in the Old Testament as an adult. In The Rape of Tamar, he retells the story of the rape of Tamar by her half-brother Amnon, the brother of Absolom. The book was adapted into a play called Yonadeb, after the narrative character in the book, and was produced in London in 1985.

In The Story of Stories: The Chosen People and its God, he provided a study of the Bible. His goal was to have a textual analysis as a narrative. The book was criticized by many Jews, probably because he refers to God as "an imaginative creation". Themes that continued to reveal themselves in his works included race relations, class consciousness, human nature, universal traits, group mentality, corruption, betrayal, guilt, power, and social morality. In an article that he wrote for Commentary in 2000, entitled "My Jewish Childhood", Jacobson said: "It is always going to be difficult to get socially and racially diverse people to live harmoniously together within a single polity." In 1985, his autobiography, Time and Again: Autobiographical Essays, was published. Each of the 13 chapters tells of an event in his life that shaped his way of thinking about the human race. The book won the J. R. Ackerley Prize for Autobiography. The God-Fearer, published in 1992, is a story of persecution. Jews are in the majority and oppress a group called the "Christers". In a Washington Post article, Anne Roiphe observed: "By making the majority Jewish, Jacobson makes it clear that power is the source of oppression: not that the power is German or Christian, but that it has the weight of numbers. … The horror of the story lies not in gruesome details or heated prose, but in the calm truth of what we call normal behavior when we try to save our skin at any cost."

In the middle 1990s, Jacobson turned to nonfiction. In 1994 he published The Electronic Elephant: A South African Journey about his travels back to South Africa to observe the changes in the land and the culture since his childhood. In 1998, Heshel's Kingdom provided a moving story of his travels to Lithuania to learn more about the life of his grandfather. He started with his grandfather's identity document, spectacles, an address book, an old photograph, and the memories of relatives. Sadly, he found no trace of his grandfather, and, indeed, not even the cemetery he was buried in remained. He did find that in 1941, within six weeks, the Nazis essentially wiped out the Lithuanian Jewish community, killing 210,000 Jewish people.

== Works ==
His early novels, including The Trap, his first published novel, focus on South African themes. His later works have been various in kind: they include works of fantasy and fictional treatments of historical episodes, as well as memoirs, critical essays, and travel books. Among the awards and prizes he has received are the John Llewellyn Rhys Prize 1959 (A Long Way from London and Other Stories); Somerset Maugham Award 1964 (Time of Arrival and Other Essays); The Jewish Chronicle Award 1977 (The Confessions of Josef Baisz); the J. R. Ackerley Prize for Autobiography 1986 (Time and Time Again). In 2000 he edited and translated from the Dutch Een mond vol Glas by Henk van Woerden, an imaginative re-creation of the circumstances leading to the assassination of the South African president Dr Hendrik Verwoerd, in the country's House of Assembly. His 2005 novel All For Love was long listed for the Man Booker Prize.

== Honours ==
Dan Jacobson received an Honorary D. Litt. from the University of the Witwatersrand, Johannesburg, and on retirement from his position at University College London was elected a Fellow of the college. He was elected a Fellow of the Royal Society of Literature in 2007.

== Papers ==
Collections of his papers can be found at the Harry Ransom Humanities Research Center, Austin, Texas; Oxford University, England; and, in South Africa, at Witwatersrand University Library, Johannesburg, the National English Literary Museum, Grahamstown, and the Africana Library, Kimberley. He died in London on 12 June 2014.

== Books ==
- The Trap (1955)
- A Dance in the Sun (1956)
- The Price of Diamonds (1958)
- The Zulu and the Zeide (1959)
- The Evidence of Love (1960)
- No Further West (1961)
- Time of Arrival (1963) (essays)
- Beggar My Neighbor (1964) (short stories)
- The Beginners (1966)
- Through the Wilderness and Other Stories (1968)
- The Rape of Tamar (1970)
- The Boss (1971)
- Inklings (1973) (short stories)
- The Wonder-Worker (1973)
- The Confessions of Josef Baisz (1979)
- The Story of the Stories: The Chosen People and Its God (1982) (non-fiction)
- Time and Time Again: Autobiographies (1985)
- Her Story (1987)
- Adult Pleasures: Essays on Writers and Readers (1989)
- Hidden in the Heart (1991)
- The God-Fearer (1992)
- The Electronic Elephant (1994)
- Heshel's Kingdom (1998)
- A Mouthful of Glass – translated and edited from Henk van Woerden's Een Mond vol Glas (2000)
- All for Love (2005)
- Literary Genius: 25 Classic Writers Who Define English & American Literature (2007) (Illustrated by Barry Moser)

== Cited in others' works ==
At the conclusion of his book Austerlitz, W. G. Sebald has his anonymous narrator take from his rucksack a copy of Dan Jacobson's Heshel's Kingdom (1998), the account of Jacobson's journey in the 1990s to Lithuania in search of traces of his grandfather Heshel's world. The orthodox rabbi Heshel Melamed's sudden death in 1919 had provided an opportunity for his widow and nine children to leave Lithuania for South Africa, which, in light of events two decades later, ironically, had been a gift of life. "On his travels in Lithuania Jacobson finds scarcely any trace of his forebears, only signs everywhere of the annihilation from which Heshel's weak heart had preserved his immediate family when it stopped beating."
