= Jonathan Goldstein (composer) =

English composer (1968–2019)

- Born: 27 September 1968
- Origin: England
- Died: 25 August 2019 (aged 50) Switzerland
- Genres: Contemporary classical, orchestral
- Occupation: Composer
- Years active: 1990s–2019
- Spouse: Hannah Marcinowicz
- Website: www.goldsteinmusic.com

Jonathan Goldstein (27 September 1968 – 25 August 2019) was an English music composer for film, television, advertising, theatre, and live events. His work encompassed a range of contemporary classical styles with orchestral, jazz, electro-acoustic, and world influences.

== Early life and education ==
Goldstein's father was an orchestra conductor and composer in London's West End. Following in his father's footsteps, Goldstein began composing in school and studied music at the University of Birmingham.

== Career ==
Goldstein began his career in theatre, at the Royal Shakespeare Company and Royal National Theatre, working with acclaimed directors including Trevor Nunn and Sir Peter Hall. He began his screen career assisting on numerous important film score orchestrations including Cape Fear, directed by Martin Scorsese, and re-orchestrations of classic film scores including Taxi Driver, performed by the Royal Philharmonic Orchestra. His debut classical album, Cyclorama, was performed by The Balanescu Quartet, released on the Brilliant Classics label, receiving critical acclaim worldwide. In 2013, his Magical Moments reached No.1 in the Official UK Classical Charts, where it stayed for three weeks over Christmas, ahead of J. S. Bach.

=== Film music ===
In his early career, Goldstein assisted the film music orchestrator Christopher Palmer, on the soundtrack orchestrations for Cape Fear, directed by Martin Scorsese and re-recordings of classic film scores including Bernard Herrmann's music for Scorsese's Taxi Driver performed by the Royal Philharmonic Orchestra, conducted by Elmer Bernstein. He subsequently scored several short films including the BAFTA-nominated Candy Bar Kid which was screened at more than 100 festivals worldwide, and the BAFTA-nominated Sunny Spells, winner of an International Silver Heron award. The documentary short Manuel De Los Santos, directed by Peter Montgomery with a score composed by Goldstein, won the Grand Prize at the International Arnold Sports Film Festival in 2012.

=== Advertising campaigns ===
In advertising, Goldstein worked for agencies in the UK including Saatchi & Saatchi, M&C Saatchi, Ogilvy, Publicis, Euro RSCG, Leo Burnett, DDB UK, CHI & Partners, Lowe, MCBD and WCRS, and in the USA for Droga5 and Publicis, composing music for television and cinema commercials on behalf of many national and international brands, which have been broadcast globally. These included American Airlines, American Express, BMW, Ford, IG Index, Intel, ITV, Kronenbourg, Lexus, NatWest, Nokia, British Sky Broadcasting (Sky), Sony, T-Mobile, Tesco, Toyota, UBS AG, Visa, Volkswagen and Zurich.

=== Industry awards ===
Goldstein won a D&AD for Outstanding Use of Music, an IVCA Award for Best Music and two British Television Advertising Awards (BTA) Craft Awards for Best Original Music as well as receiving nominations for two additional BTA Craft awards. He was also nominated for an Ivor Novello Award in 2007, for his score to the BBC/HBO film of Primo, directed by Richard Wilson featuring the contemporary celloist, Nicholas Holland, who has recorded with Peter Gabriel and David Byrne. Goldstein was chairman of PCAM, the Society for Producers and Composers of Applied Music from 2005-2012.

=== Broadcast music ===
In television, Goldstein composed music for several BBC productions including Nunn's adaptation of Othello, David Thacker's production of Ibsen's A Doll's House with Guy Woolfenden, the prize-winning documentary series Eutopia: The United States of Europe filmed in 22 countries, and Playing The Wife, starring Derek Jacobi, for BBC Radio. In 2010, he created music for the Little Crackers comedy series starring Meera Syal, broadcast in 3D on Sky and Sky1.

=== Events ===
Goldstein composed, produced and conducted scores for major events including work for Microsoft, British Telecom, Frankfurt Motor Show, Madame Tussaud's, a suite for the Bentley Experience at the Volkswagen Theme Park, Autostadt, Germany, and the United Arab Emirates installation at the Shanghai World Expo 2010, featuring the classical vocalist Jeremy Avis reedist Belinda Sykes and percussionist Paul Clarvis. His classical work Circles was shortlisted for performance by the Society for the Promotion of New Music, and premiered at St John’s Smith Square, London, performed by Music Projects London, conducted by Richard Bernas, featuring the oboe soloist Christopher Redgate. The concert also featured works by composers Judith Weir and Sadie Harrison.

=== Recording work ===
In 2012, Goldstein's debut classical album, Cyclorama, was released worldwide by Brilliant Classics. The music was performed by the Balanescu Quartet, founded by the violinist Alexander Bălănescu, and an ensemble of soloists including James Pearson, a soloist with the Hallé, Philharmonia and BBC Concert Orchestras and Artistic Director of the London jazz club Ronnie Scott's, whose collaborations include Paul McCartney and Wynton Marsalis. The recording also featured the soprano Grace Davidson, who has performed with the Early Music groups The Sixteen, and Tenebrae, as well as on soundtracks such as Hans Zimmer's Pirates of the Caribbean: On Stranger Tides.

The album, which consists of a mix of contemporary classical idioms which gradually present an unfolding story, like a cyclorama (the panoramic backdrop used in film and theatre), was recorded at the Church of Saint Jude-on-the-Hill, Hampstead Garden Suburb, London, noted for its haunting acoustics. The church has been the chosen venue for many important recordings of film and concert music including the Chandos Records re-recordings of William Walton’s scores for Laurence Olivier's Shakespeare films, performed by The Orchestra and Chorus of The Academy of St Martin in the Fields and conducted by Neville Marriner, on which Goldstein worked as an assistant orchestrator.

== Personal life and death ==
Goldstein married Hannah Marcinowicz, a saxophonist, in 2016. They and their 7-month-old daughter, Saskia, died on 25 August 2019 when their Piper plane crashed above the Simplon Pass on a flight from Switzerland to Italy. Swiss search and rescue units found no survivors; all three were presumed to have died immediately upon impact.

== Awards ==
Awarded

- 2016 Music & Sound Award for Best Re-record or Adaptation - TV & Cinema Advertising (The Voice 'Season 4' Trailer)
- 2015 LIA Award for Music Adaptation - Bronze (The Voice 'Season 4 Trailer)
- 2014 Music & Sound Award for Best Original Composition - TV & Cinema Advertising (Lexus 'Swarm' CHI & Partners)
- 2009 British Arrows Award for Best Original Music (Zurich 'Consumer' Publicis London)
- 2003 D&AD Award for Outstanding Use of Music (NSPCC 'Cartoon' Saatchi & Saatchi)
- 2002 British Arrows Award for Best Original Music (NSPCC 'Cartoon' Saatchi & Saatchi)
- 2002 IVCA Silver Award for Best Music (Volkswagen 'Experience', Frankfurt Motor Show)

Nominated

- 2015 Music & Sound Award for Best Original Composition - TV & Cinema Advertising (Lexus 'Swarm' CHI & Partners)
- 2014 LIA Award for Music Original (Lexus 'Swarm' CHI & Partners)
- 2012 Music & Sound Award for Best Original Composition - TV & Cinema Advertising (Sky Movies 'Coming Home' WCRS)
- 2010 British Arrows Award for Best Original Music (Weetabix 'Steeplechase' WCRS)
- 2007 Ivor Novello Award for Best Television Soundtrack ('Primo' HBO/BBC)
- 2004 British Arrows Award for Best Original Music (Volkswagen 'Giants' DDB London)

== Musical works ==
Advertising

- American Airlines, American Express, Argos, BMW, British Army, Bourne Leisure, British Gas, Britvic, Carlsberg Group, Cereal Partners, Chelsea Building Society, Coca-Cola Company, Diageo, Doughty Hanson & Co, Ford, General Mills, IG Index, Intel, Kellogg's, Kimberly-Clark, Kraft Foods, ITV, Lexus, Marks & Spencer, Monster.com, Nestlé, News International, Nokia, Norwich Union, the NSPCC, Pepsico, Pernod Ricard, Premier Foods, Procter & Gamble, Reckitt Benckiser, Royal Bank of Scotland, RSPCA, Scotts Miracle-Gro Company, Sky, Sony, Tate & Lyle, Tesco, Thomas Cook, T-Mobile, Toyota, TUI Travel, UBS AG, Unilever, VISA, Vodafone, Volkswagen, Weetabix Limited, Zurich

Film features

- 2005 Primo (composer and conductor), directed by Richard Wilson, HBO/BBC/Rainmark Films (Ivor Novello Award nominee & BAFTA-nominated)
- 2005 Primo (composer and conductor), directed by Robin Lough, Heritage Theatre/Kultur International Films/Kultur Video
- 2004 Othello (music director), directed by Trevor Nunn, BBC/Image Entertainment/Primetime Television
- 1991 Cape Fear (assistant orchestrator), directed by Martin Scorsese, Universal Pictures

Film shorts

- 2012 Manuel De Los Santos (composer), directed by Peter Montgomery
- 2007 Traffic Warden (composer), directed by Benjamin Johns, Eye-Cue Films
- 2002 Candy Bar Kid (composer), directed by Shan Khan, Eye-Cue Films/Bigheid Films (BAFTA-nominated)
- 1997 Sunny Spells (composer), directed by Tim Holloway, Tilt Films (Montecatini Terme Short Film Festival-International Silver Heron Award winner & BAFTA-nominated)
- 1997 Slapped (composer), directed by Richard Treister, Lionheart Films
- 1996 Box (composer), directed by Tom Vaughan, Partners In Film
- 1995 For Respect (composer), directed by Sarah Wilkinson, Final Print
- 1995 All Ova Again (composer), directed by Maximilian Jacobson-Gonzalez, Outrageous Fortune Productions

Television and radio

- 2010 Uncle Santa (Little Crackers) (composer), written by Meera Syal, Directed by Peter Lydon, Sky Television/Renegade Films
- 2005 Primo (composer and conductor), directed by Richard Wilson, HBO/BBC/Rainmark Films
- 2004 Othello (music director), directed by Trevor Nunn, Starring Ian McKellen, Willard White, Zoë Wanamaker & Imogen Stubbs, BBC/Image Entertainment/Primetime
- 2000 Eutopia: The United States Of Europe (Composer), series directed by Colin Luke, Mosaic Films/Compagnie Phares Et Balises/BBC
- 1997 Playing The Wife (composer), starring Derek Jacobi & Jennifer Ehle, BBC Radio 4
- 1992 A Doll’s House (music associate), directed by David Thacker, Starring Juliet Stevenson & Trevor Eve, BBC TV

Theatre (composer)

- A Midsummer Night’s Dream, Regent's Park Open-Air Theatre, directed by Deborah Paige
- Brecht In Exile, Moving Theatre Company, directed by Corin and Vanessa Redgrave
- Casement, Riverside Studios, Moving Theatre Company, directed by Corin & Vanessa Redgrave
- De Profundis, RNT, Directed by Trevor Nunn, starring Corin Redgrave & Sheila Hancock
- De Profundis, RNT & USA, Moving Theatre Company, directed by Corin & Vanessa Redgrave
- Dr Jekyll and Mr Hyde, Birmingham Repertory Theatre, directed by Bill Alexander
- Frozen, Birmingham Repertory Theatre, World première by Bryony Lavery, directed by Bill Alexander, Starring Josie Lawrence & Anita Dobson
- Frozen, RNT, by Bryony Lavery, Directed by Bill Alexander, starring Josie Lawrence & Anita Dobson
- Goodbye Kiss, Orange Tree Theatre, directed by Joe Harmston
- Hamlet, Regent's Park Open-Air Theatre, directed by Tim Pigott-Smith
- Hamlet, Birmingham Repertory Theatre, directed by Bill Alexander
- In Extremis, RNT, Written by Neil Bartlett, directed by Trevor Nunn, Starring Corin Redgrave & Sheila Hancock
- Jumpers, Birmingham Repertory Theatre, directed by Bill Alexander
- King Lear, RSC & West End, Directed by Bill Alexander, starring Corin Redgrave
- Macbeth, Birmingham Repertory Theatre, directed by Bill Alexander
- Mappa Mundi, RNT, World première by Shelagh Stephenson, directed by Bill Alexander, starring Alun Armstrong
- Nativity, Birmingham Repertory Theatre, directed by Bill Alexander
- Old Times, Birmingham Repertory Theatre, directed by Bill Alexander, starring Tim Pigott-Smith & Carol Royle
- Othello, Birmingham Repertory Theatre, directed by Bill Alexander
- Playing The Wife, Compass Touring Theatre, directed by Tim Pigott-Smith (National Tour starring Julia Ormond)
- Primo, RNT & Off Broadway, directed by Richard Wilson, starring Antony Sher
- Primo, Hampstead Theatre, directed by Richard Wilson, starring Antony Sher
- Prophet In Exile, Gibran Productions, directed by Corin Redgrave (dramatisation by Nadim Sawalha of the life of Kahlil Gibran, author of The Prophet)
- Richard III, Regent's Park Open-Air Theatre, directed by Brian Cox
- The Alchemist, RNT, directed by Bill Alexander, starring Simon Callow, Josie Lawrence and Tim Pigott-Smith
- The Alchemist, Birmingham Repertory Theatre, directed by Bill Alexander
- The Bright And Bold Design, RSC, written by Peter Whelan, directed by Bill Alexander
- The Flag, Moving Theatre Company, directed by Corin and Vanessa Redgrave
- The Four Alice Bakers, Birmingham Repertory Theatre, directed by Bill Alexander, world premiere by Fay Weldon, starring Michael Cashman
- The Guests, Orange Tree Theatre, directed by Joe Harmston
- The Last Obit, New End Theatre, written by Peter Tinniswood, directed by Joe Harmston
- The Merchant of Venice, Birmingham Repertory Theatre, directed by Bill Alexander, starring Cathy Tyson and David Schofield
- The Real Thing, Theatre Royal (Bath), directed by Tim Pigott-Smith, starring Tom Conti
- The Relapse, RSC, Directed by Ian Judge, starring Victor Spinetti
- The Servant, Birmingham Repertory Theatre, directed by Bill Alexander
- The Taming Of The Shrew, RSC, Directed by Bill Alexander, starring Anton Lesser
- The Tempest, Birmingham Repertory Theatre, directed by Bill Alexander
- The Way of The World, Birmingham Repertory Theatre, directed by Bill Alexander
- Titus Andronicus, RSC, directed by Bill Alexander, starring David Bradley
- Twelfth Night, Birmingham Repertory Theatre, directed by Bill Alexander
- Volpone, Birmingham Repertory Theatre, directed by Bill Alexander

Theatre (other)

- A Christmas Carol (orchestrations), RSC, directed by Ian Judge
- Love’s Labour’s Lost (music associate), RSC, directed by Ian Judge
- Lysistrata (music associate), Peter Hall Company, directed by Peter Hall, starring Geraldine James
- Othello (music director), RSC, directed by Trevor Nunn, starring Ian McKellen, Willard White, Zoë Wanamaker & Imogen Stubbs

Events

- Arthur Andersen, UK
- Bentley Experience, Volkswagen Theme Park, Autostadt, Germany
- British Telecom, UK
- Compaq, UK
- Volkswagen Experience, Frankfurt Motorshow, Germany
- Land Rover Freelander Launch, UK
- Madame Tussaud's, Las Vegas, USA
- Tech-Ed, Microsoft, Amsterdam, Holland
- Money Zone, Millennium Dome, UK
- Museum in Docklands, UK
- Opel, UK
- Orange, UK
- Toyota, UK
- United Arab Emirates Pavilion, Shanghai World Expo 2010, China

== Associated recordings ==
Video

- 2005 Cape Fear, Directed by Martin Scorsese, Universal Studios Home Entertainment (DVD)
- 2005 Primo, Directed by Richard Wilson, HBO/BBC/Rainmark Films (DVD)
- 2005 Primo, Directed by Robin Lough, Heritage Theatre/Kultur International Films/Kultur Video (DVD)
- 2004 Othello, Directed by Trevor Nunn, BBC/Image Entertainment/Primetime (DVD)

Audio

- 2012 Cyclorama, performed by the Balanescu Quartet with James Pearson and Grace Davidson, Brilliant Classics (CD)
- 2002 De Profundis, performed by Corin Redgrave and Yoo Hong Lee, produced by Roger Elsgood, Stage Adaptation by Merlin Holland, L'ocean/Sitespecific Records/Smartpass (CD)
- 1993 Bernard Herrmann Film Scores: From Citizen Kane To Taxi Driver, Elmer Bernstein Conducts The Royal Philharmonic Orchestra, Milan Records (CD) [re-released 2004]
- 1991 Circles, performed by Music Projects London, conducted by Richard Bernas, SPNM (MC)
- 1990 Scenes From Shakespeare: Henry V/As You Like It/Hamlet/Richard III, Chandos Records (CD) [re-released 2007]
- 1990 Walton: Hamlet/As You Like It, Chandos Records (CD) [re-released 2007]
- 1990 Walton: Richard III, Chandos Records (CD) [re-released 2007]
