= Henk van Woerden =

Dutch painter

Henk van Woerden (Dutch pronunciation: [ˈɦɛŋk fɑɱ ˈʋuːrdə(n)]; 6 December 1947 – 16 November 2005) was a Dutch painter and writer with close ties to South Africa.

== Biography ==
He was born in Leiden. In 1956 he emigrated with his family to Cape Town, South Africa. Van Woerden matriculated in 1964 at the Fine Arts faculty of the University of Cape Town. After three years he broke off his studies and moved to Amsterdam.

"I hardly existed at that stage. I had refused to register for national service, carried no "White" pass, paid no taxes, and in effect remained in South Africa illegally, which was the preferred state of affairs." — van Woerden on leaving South africa

After extensive travelling in Europe, and a stay on Crete, he started his artistic career first as painter based in the Dutch capital. He received the Royal Award for Painting in 1980, and represented the country at international exhibitions.

In the 80's the focus of his artistic work shifted to writing. The first books are part of his South African trilogy, beginning with Moenie kyk nie (Don't Look, 1993) and Tikoes (1996). Followed by Een mond vol Glas (1998) which found critical acclaim by renowned South African writers as Breyten Breytenbach, J.M. Coetzee or André Brink, and won the 2001 Alan Paton Award. It is a biography of Dimitri Tsafendas who assassinated South African president Dr Hendrik Verwoerd, in the House of Assembly in 1966, was declared insane, and held in prison until he died in 1999. In 2000 Dan Jacobson edited and translated the book into English as A Mouthful of Glass or The assassin: a story of race and rage in the land of Apartheid (American edition). A Mouthful of Glass was later used as the basis for the 2003 stage play I.D.

This trilogy was followed by Notities van een luchtfietser (Notes from an Air Cyclist, 2002), about travelling in realty as in the mind, and Ultramarijn (Ultramarine, 2005) which would turn out to be his last work.

His books have been translated into more than ten languages.

Henk van Woerden died in November 2005 of a heart attack in Ann Arbor, Michigan, where he stayed as Writer-in-Residence for the University of Michigan.

== Bibliography ==
In Dutch:

- Moenie kyk nie, 1993
- Tikoes, 1996
- Een mond vol glas, 1998
- Notities van een luchtfietser, 2002
- Ultramarijn, 2005

In English:

- A Mouthful of Glass, 2000, ISBN 1-86207-442-9
