= Kirk Heilbrun =

American pscyhologist

- Citizenship: United States
- Education: University of Texas at Austin
- Scientific career
- Fields: Forensic psychology
- Workplaces: Drexel University; Drexel University College of Medicine

Kirk Heilbrun is a psychologist and professor of Psychological and Brain Sciences at Drexel University known for his research in the intersection of law and psychology.

He has contributed to forensic mental health assessment, risk communication, legal decision-making and social justice. He received the Distinguished Contributions to Psychology and Law Award from American Psychological Association.

== Education ==
He earned his doctoral degree in clinical psychology from the University of Texas at Austin in 1980. His interest in the intersection of psychology and law developed during this interdisciplinary field's formative years.

== Career ==
He began his career in applied settings, working in hospitals, clinics, and courtrooms. In 1995, he joined MCP Hahnemann University as a professor and co-director of the Law-Psychology Program. During this period, he also held a position as a lecturer in law at Villanova School of Law.

In 2002, Heilbrun joined Drexel University, serving as department head of psychology and later the Department of Psychological and Brain Sciences.

Earlier in his career, he held appointments at institutions, including the Medical College of Virginia, Florida State University, and the Florida Mental Health Institute at the University of South Florida.

== Research ==
His research extends into social justice and racial identity, examining how cognitive biases and systemic factors influence legal evaluations.

Heilbrun has also collaborated on intervention programs for individuals involved in the justice system, including the Supervision to Aid Reentry (STAR) program, which employs cognitive-behavioral strategies to support the transition of formerly incarcerated individuals back into society.

His scholarly commentary explores ethical and methodological challenges in forensic psychology, tackling topics such as the misuse of labels like psychopathy and the impact of situational variables on behavior prediction.

He highlights that while most defendants respond to treatments like antipsychotic medication within six months, a subset does not, due to factors such as medication ineffectiveness, inappropriate dosages, or psychological factors like exaggerating symptom.

== Selected publications ==
=== Books ===
- Heilbrun, Kirk; Greene, Edith; Douglass, Amy (2024). Wrightsman's psychology and the legal system (10th ed.). Boston: Cengage. ISBN 978-0-357-79746-4.
- Heilbrun, Kirk; Wright, Jean; Giallella, Christy; DeMatteo, David (2021). University and public behavioral health organization collaboration: Models for success in justice contexts. New York: Oxford. ISBN 978-0-19-005285-0.
- Heilbrun, Kirk (2009). Evaluation for risk of violence in adults. Best practices in forensic mental health assessment. New York: Oxford University Press. ISBN 978-0-19-536981-6.
- Heilbrun, Kirk; DeMatteo, David; King, Christopher; Filone, Sarah (2017). Evaluating juvenile transfer and disposition: law, science, and practice. International perspectives on forensic mental health. New York: Routledge. ISBN 978-1-138-95795-4.
- Heilbrun, Kirk; Grisso, Thomas; Goldstein, Alan M. (2009). Foundations of forensic mental health assessment. Best practices in forensic mental health assessment. New York: Oxford University Press. ISBN 978-0-19-532309-2.
- Heilbrun, Kirk; DeMatteo, Dave; Brooks Holliday, Stephanie; LaDuke, Casey (2014). Forensic mental health assessment: a casebook (2nd ed.). Oxford; New York: Oxford University Press. ISBN 978-0-19-994155-1.
- Heilbrun, Kirk (2001). Principles of forensic mental health assessment. New York: Kluwer Academic/Plenum Press. ISBN 0-306-46538-8.
- Heilbrun, Kirk; Edith, Greene (March 5, 2018). MindTap Psychology, 1 term (6 months) Printed Access Card for Greene/Heilbrun's Wrightsman's Psychology and the Legal System, 9th (9th ed.). Cengage Learning. ISBN 978-1337570909.

=== Journals ===
- Heilbrun, Kirk (June 1, 1992). "The role of psychological testing in forensic assessment". Law and Human Behavior. 16 (3): 257–272. doi:10.1007/BF01044769. ISSN 1573-661X.
- Heilbrun, Kirk; Durham, Kelley; Thornewill, Alice; Schiedel, Rebecca; Pietruszka, Victoria; Phillips, Sarah; Locklair, Benjamin; Thomas, Joanna (2018). "Life-sentenced juveniles: Public perceptions of risk and need for incarceration". Behavioral Sciences & the Law. 36 (5): 587–596. doi:10.1002/bsl.2377. ISSN 0735-3936. PMID 30298613.
- Heilbrun, Kirk; Slobogin, Christopher; Dvoskin, Joel (2024). "Reimagining risk assessment: Comment on Viljoen and Vincent (2020)". Clinical Psychology: Science and Practice. 31 (2): 132–135. doi:10.1037/cps0000208. ISSN 1468-2850.
- Heilbrun, Kirk; Zapotocky, Heidi (November 16, 2023), "Juvenile Homicide", The Routledge International Handbook of Juvenile Homicide (1 ed.), London: Routledge, pp. 600–609, doi:10.4324/9781003242833-46, ISBN 978-1-003-24283-3
- Heilbrun, Kirk; Giallella, Christy; Wright, H. Jean; DeMatteo, David; Griffin, Patricia A.; Gowensmith, Neil; Locklair, Benjamin; Ayers, David; Desai, Alisha; Pietruszka, Victoria (2023). "Appraising Jackson-based unrestorability to competence to stand trial: The demonstration model". Psychological Services. 20 (3): 553–564. doi:10.1037/ser0000578. ISSN 1939-148X. PMID 37307318.
- Desai, Alisha; DeMatteo, David; Heilbrun, Kirk; Holliday, Ryan; Lankford, Claire; Rotrosen, John (2023). "Public perception on policies to address prenatal substance use: Recommendations regarding maternal criminal prosecution and child welfare". Psychology, Public Policy, and Law. 29 (3): 402–415. doi:10.1037/law0000387. ISSN 1939-1528.
- McPhee, Jeanne; Heilbrun, Kirk; Cubbon, Denise Navarre; Soler, Mark; Goldstein, Naomi E. (2023). "What's risk got to do with it: Judges' and probation officers' understanding and use of juvenile risk assessments in making residential placement decisions". Law and Human Behavior. 47 (2): 320–332. doi:10.1037/lhb0000528. ISSN 1573-661X. PMC 10102975. PMID 37053385.
- Arnold, Shelby; Thornewill, Alice; Heilbrun, Kirk; DeMatteo, David (February 23, 2023), "Rehabilitative Justice: Problem-Solving Courts", in DeMatteo, David; Scherr, Kyle C. (eds.), The Oxford Handbook of Psychology and Law (1 ed.), Oxford University Press, pp. 429–444, doi:10.1093/oxfordhb/9780197649138.013.25, ISBN 978-0-19-764913-8
