= Antony Sher =

South African-born British actor (1949–2021)

Sir Antony Sher KBE
- Born: 14 June 1949; Cape Town, Cape, South Africa
- Died: 2 December 2021 (aged 72); Stratford-upon-Avon, Warwickshire, England
- Citizenship: South Africa; United Kingdom (after 1979)
- Education: Sea Point High School; Webber Douglas Academy of Dramatic Art
- Occupations: Actor, writer, theatre director
- Years active: 1972–2021
- Organization(s): Royal National Theatre; Royal Shakespeare Company
- Notable work: I.D. (2003); Primo (2004)
- Spouse: Gregory Doran (m. 2015)
- Relatives: Ronald Harwood (cousin)
- Awards: 2 Laurence Olivier Awards; 1 Screen Actors Guild Award; 1 Drama Desk Award; 1 Evening Standard Award; 1 Critics Circle Theatre Award; 1 TMA Award

Sir Antony Sher KBE (14 June 1949 – 2 December 2021) was a South African-British actor, writer, and theatre director. A two-time Laurence Olivier Award winner and a five-time nominee, he joined the Royal Shakespeare Company in 1982 and toured in many roles, as well as appearing on film and television. He was also the cousin of playwright Ronald Harwood.

During his 2017 "Commonwealth Tour", Prince Charles referred to Sher as his favourite actor.

== Early life and education ==
Sher was born on 14 June 1949 in Cape Town, South Africa, the son of Jewish parents Margery (née Abramowitz) and Emmanuel Sher, who worked in business. He was a first cousin once removed of the playwright Sir Ronald Harwood. He grew up in the suburb of Sea Point, where he attended Sea Point High School.

Sher moved to the United Kingdom in 1968 and auditioned at the Central School of Speech and Drama and the Royal Academy of Dramatic Art (RADA), but was unsuccessful. He instead studied at the Webber Douglas Academy of Dramatic Art from 1969 to 1971 and subsequently on the one-year postgraduate course run jointly by Manchester University Drama Department and the Manchester School of Theatre.

Sher became a British citizen in 1979.

== Career ==
In the 1970s, Sher was part of a group of young actors and writers working at the Liverpool Everyman Theatre. Comprising figures such as writers Alan Bleasdale and Willy Russell and fellow actors Trevor Eve, Bernard Hill, Jonathan Pryce, and Julie Walters, Sher summed up the work of the company with the phrase "anarchy ruled". He also performed with the theatre group Gay Sweatshop, before joining the Royal Shakespeare Company (RSC) in 1982.

While a member of the RSC, Sher was cast in the title role in Molière's Tartuffe, and played the Fool in King Lear. His major break came in 1984, when he performed the title role in Richard III and won the Laurence Olivier Award. Also for the RSC, Sher performed the lead in such productions as Tamburlaine, Cyrano de Bergerac, Stanley, and Macbeth, and in 2014 played Falstaff in Henry IV Part 1 and Henry IV Part 2 in Stratford-upon-Avon and on national tour. He played the eponymous 'King Lear' from 2016 to 2018. He also played Johnnie in Athol Fugard's Hello and Goodbye, Iago in Othello, Malvolio in Twelfth Night, and Shylock in The Merchant of Venice. Sher received his second Laurence Olivier Award in 1997 for his performance as Stanley Spencer in Stanley.

In 2001, Sher played the role of the composer Gustav Mahler in Ronald Harwood's play Mahler's Conversion, about Mahler's decision to renounce his Jewish faith prior to his appointment as conductor and artistic director of the Vienna State Opera House in 1897. Speaking about the role to The Guardian's Rupert Smith, Sher revealed:

When I came to England in 1968, at 19, I looked around me and I didn't see any Jewish leading men in the classical theatre, so I thought it best to conceal my Jewishness. Also, I quickly became conscious of apartheid when I arrived here, and I didn't want to be known as a white South African. I was brought up in a very apolitical family. We were happy to enjoy the benefits of apartheid without questioning the system behind it. Reading about apartheid when I came to England was a terrible shock. So I lost the accent almost immediately, and if anyone asked me where I was from I would lie. If they asked where I went to school, I'd say Hampstead, which got me into all sorts of trouble because of course everyone else went to school in Hampstead and they wanted to know which one. Then there was my sexuality. The theatre was full of gay people, but none of them were out, and there was that ugly story about Gielgud being arrested for cottaging, so I thought I'd better hide that as well. Each of these things went into the closet until my entire identity was in the closet. That's why this play appealed to me so much: it's about an artist changing his identity in order to get what he wants.

In 2015, he played Willy Loman in Death of a Salesman.

He also had several film credits to his name, including Yanks (1979), Superman II (1980), Shadey (1985), and Erik the Viking (1989). Sher starred as the Chief Weasel in the 1996 film adaptation of The Wind in the Willows and as Benjamin Disraeli in the 1997 film Mrs Brown.

Sher's television appearances include the mini-series The History Man (1981) and The Jury (2002). In 2003, he played the central character in an adaptation of the J. G. Ballard short story "The Enormous Space", filmed as Home and broadcast on BBC Four. In Hornblower (1999), he played the role of French royalist Colonel de Moncoutant, Marquis de Muzillac, in the episode "The Frogs and the Lobsters". Sher's more recent credits included a cameo in the British comedy film Three and Out (2008) and the role of Akiba in the television play God on Trial (2008).

Sher was cast in the role of Thráin II, father of Thorin Oakenshield in Peter Jackson's The Hobbit: The Desolation of Smaug, but appears only in the Extended Edition of the film.

In 2018, he played the title role in King Lear and was the only person to play both the Fool and King Lear at the Royal Shakespeare Company. He returned to Stratford-upon-Avon in 2019 to perform in Kunene and the King with John Kani.

=== Other work ===
Sher's books included the memoirs Year of the King (1985), Woza Shakespeare: Titus Andronicus in South Africa (with Gregory Doran, 1997), Beside Myself (an autobiography, 2002), Primo Time (2005), and Year of the Fat Knight (2015), a book of paintings and drawings, Characters (1990), and the novels Middlepost (1989), Cheap Lives (1995), The Indoor Boy (1996). and The Feast (1999). His 2018 book Year of the Mad King won the 2019 Theatre Book Prize, awarded by the Society for Theatre Research.

Sher also wrote several plays, including I.D. (2003) and Primo (2004). The latter was adapted as a film in 2005. In 2008, The Giant, the first of his plays in which Sher did not feature, was performed at the Hampstead Theatre. The main characters are Michelangelo (at the time of his creation of David), Leonardo da Vinci, and Vito, their mutual apprentice.

In 2005, Sher directed Breakfast With Mugabe at the Swan Theatre, Stratford-upon-Avon. The production moved to the Soho Theatre in April 2006 and the Duchess Theatre one month later. In 2007, he made a crime documentary for Channel 4, titled Murder Most Foul, about his native South Africa. It examines the double murder of actor Brett Goldin and fashion designer Richard Bloom. In 2011, Sher appeared in the BBC TV series The Shadow Line in the role of Glickman.

== Honours ==
- 1998: Honorary Doctor of Letters (Hon. Litt.D.) from the University of Liverpool
- 2000: Knight Commander of the Most Excellent Order of the British Empire (KBE) for services to theatre
- 2007: Honorary Doctor of Letters (Hon. Litt.D.) from the University of Warwick
- 2010: Honorary Doctor of Letters (Hon. Litt.D.) from the University of Cape Town

== Personal life ==
In 2005, Sher and the director Gregory Doran, with whom he frequently collaborated professionally, entered into a civil partnership in the UK. They married on 30 December 2015, a little over ten years after the registration of their civil partnership.

=== Illness and death ===
On 10 September 2021, it was announced that Sher was terminally ill and Doran took compassionate leave from the RSC to care for him. Sher died from cancer at his home in Stratford-upon-Avon on 2 December 2021, aged 72.

== Stage performances ==
=== Theatre ===
- 1972–74: Multiple roles at the Everyman Theatre, Liverpool.
- 1974: Ringo Starr in Willy Russell's John, Paul, George, Ringo ... and Bert at the Everyman Theatre, Liverpool, where it opened in May 1974. Transferred to the Lyric Theatre, London, in August.
- 1975: Teeth 'n' Smiles by David Hare at the Royal Court Theatre, where it opened in September 1975, subsequently transferring to Wyndham's Theatre in May 1976.
- 1979: American Days by Stephen Poliakoff at the ICA, London.
- 1982: Mike Leigh's Goosepimples in the West End.
- 1982: The Fool in King Lear at the Royal Shakespeare Theatre. Transferred to the Barbican Centre in 1983.
- 1983: Maydays by David Edgar at the Barbican Centre
- 1984: Richard III with the Royal Shakespeare Company (RSC). Transferred to the Barbican Centre in 1985.
- 1985: Torch Song Trilogy at the Albery Theatre, West End.
- 1985: Red Noses at the Barbican Theatre, London.
- 1987: Shylock in The Merchant of Venice with the RSC.
- 1987: Henry Irving in Happy Birthday, Sir Larry at the Royal National Theatre, London (Laurence Olivier 80th birthday tribute).
- 1988: Vendice in The Revenger's Tragedy with the RSC.
- 1990: Peter Flannery's Singer with the RSC, Barbican Theatre.
- 1991: Kafka's The Trial and Brecht's The Resistible Rise of Arturo Ui at the Royal National Theatre.
- 1992: Tamburlaine in Tamburlaine with the RSC at the Swan Theatre, Stratford-upon-Avon.
- 1993: Henry Carr in Travesties at the Barbican Centre with the RSC, later at the Savoy Theatre, West End.
- 1994–95: Titus Andronicus at the Market Theatre, Johannesburg. Transferred to the Royal National Theatre, London, and for a UK tour.
- 1996: Stanley at the Royal National Theatre (Cottesloe) (repeated on Broadway at the Circle in the Square Theatre)
- 1997: Cyrano de Bergerac at the Lyric Theatre, West End.
- 1998–99: The Winter's Tale at the Barbican Centre with the RSC.
- 1999: Macbeth at the Swan Theatre, Stratford-upon-Avon, with the RSC.
- 2000–01: Macbeth and The Winter's Tale with the RSC.
- 2002: RSC's Jacobean season transfers to the West End.
- 2003: I.D. at the Almeida Theatre, London
- 2004: Primo at the Cottesloe Theatre, Royal National Theatre, London (repeated on Broadway at the Music Box Theatre, July–August 2005)
- 2007: Kean in Kean at the Yvonne Arnaud Theatre, Guildford. Transferred to the Apollo Theatre, West End in May.
- 2008: Prospero in The Tempest at the Baxter Theatre, Cape Town; Courtyard Theatre, Stratford-upon-Avon; and on tour in Richmond, Leeds, Bath, Nottingham and Sheffield
- 2010: Tomas Stockmann in An Enemy of the People at the Sheffield Crucible
- 2011: Phillip Gellburg in Arthur Miller's Broken Glass at the Vaudeville Theatre
- 2012: Jacob Bindel in Travelling Light at the Royal National Theatre, Sigmund Freud in Hysteria by Terry Johnson at Theatre Royal Bath, later revived at Hampstead Theatre in 2013.
- 2013: Wilhelm Voigt in The Captain of Köpenick at the Olivier Theatre, Royal National Theatre, London.
- 2014: Falstaff in Henry IV, Part 1 and Henry IV Part 2 with the RSC.
- 2015: Willy Loman in Death of a Salesman by Arthur Miller with the RSC.
- 2016: The title role in King Lear with the RSC (reprised in 2018).
- 2018: Nicolas in One for the Road from Pinter One at the Harold Pinter Theatre with The Jamie Lloyd Company.
- 2019-20: Jack Morris in Kunene and the King by John Kani, with the RSC.

== Filmography ==
=== Film ===
Year	Title	Role	Notes
1976	The Madness	Militia man/Young man in café	
1979	Collision Course	Tasic	
1979	One Fine Day	Mr Alpert	
1979	Yanks	G.I. at cinema	
1980	Superman II	Bell Boy	
1985	Shadey	Oliver Shadey	
1989	Erik the Viking	Loki	
1995	The Young Poisoner's Handbook	Ernest Zeigler	
1996	The Wind in the Willows	Chief Weasel	
1996	Indian Summer	Jack	
1997	Mrs Brown	Benjamin Disraeli	
1998	Shakespeare in Love	Dr Moth	
1999	The Miracle Maker	Ben Azra (voice)	
2004	Churchill: The Hollywood Years	Adolf Hitler	
2005	A Higher Agency	Chef	Short
2008	Three and Out	Maurice	
2010	The Wolfman	Dr Hoenneger	
2013	The Hobbit: The Desolation of Smaug	Thráin II	Extended Edition only
2014	War Book	David	

=== Television ===
Year	Title	Role	Notes
1978	ITV Playhouse	Morris	Episode: "Cold Harbour"
1979	Play for Today	Nathan	Episode: "The Out of Town Boys"
1981	The History Man	Howard Kirk	Miniseries
1982	The Further Adventures of Lucky Jim	Maurice Victor	Episode: "Will Success Spoil Jim Dixon?"
1985	Tartuffe, or the Impostor	Tartuffe	TV Movie
1990	ScreenPlay	David Samuels	Episode: "The Land of Dreams"
1992	The Comic Strip Presents...	Scum editor	Episode: "The Crying Game"
1993	Screen Two	Genghis Cohn	Episode: "Genghis Cohn"
1994	Shakespeare: The Animated Tales	Richard III	Episode: Richard III
1995	One Foot in the Grave	Mr Prothrow	Episode: "Rearranging the Dust"
1996	The Moonstone	Sergeant Cuff	Miniseries
1999	Hornblower	Colonel Moncoutant	Episode: "The Frogs and the Lobsters"
2002	The Jury	Gerald Lewis QC	Season 1
2003	Home	Gerald Ballantyne	TV film
2004	Murphy's Law	Frank Jeremy	Episode: "Jack's Back"
2005	Primo	Primo Levi	TV film
2007	The Company	Ezra ben Ezra, the Rabbi	Episode 5
2008	God on Trial	Akiba	TV film
2011	The Shadow Line	Peter Glickman	2 episodes
2013	Agatha Christie's Marple	Jason Rafiel	Episode: A Caribbean Mystery

== Awards and nominations ==
=== BAFTA TV Awards ===
1 nomination

British Academy Television Awards
Year	Nominated work	Category	Result
2008	Primo	Best Actor	Nominated

=== Laurence Olivier Awards ===
2 wins, 5 nominations

Laurence Olivier Award
Year	Nominated work	Category	Result
1983	King Lear	Best Actor in a Supporting Role	Nominated
1985	Richard III and Torch Song Trilogy	Best Actor	Won
1988	The Merchant of Venice and Hello and Goodbye	Actor of the Year in a Revival	Nominated
1997	Stanley	Best Actor	Won
2000	The Winter's Tale	Best Actor	Nominated

=== Drama Desk Awards ===
1 win and 1 nomination

Drama Desk Award
Year	Nominated work	Category	Result
2006	Primo	Outstanding One-Person Show "Primo"	Won

=== Evening Standard Theatre Awards ===
1 win and 1 nomination

Evening Standard Theatre Awards
Year	Nominated work	Category	Result
1985	Richard III	Best Actor	Won

=== Evening Standard British Film Awards ===
1 win and 1 nomination

Evening Standard British Film Awards
Year	Nominated work	Category	Result
1997	Mrs Brown	Peter Sellers Award for Comedy	Won

=== Screen Actors Guild Awards ===
1 win and 1 nomination

Screen Actors Guild Award
Year	Nominated work	Category	Result
1997	Shakespeare in Love	Outstanding Performance by a Cast in a Motion Picture	Won

=== Theatre Awards UK (TMA) ===
1 win and 1 nomination

Theatre Awards UK
Year	Nominated work	Category	Result
1997	Titus Andronicus	Best Actor in a Play	Won

=== Tony Awards ===
1 nomination

Tony Awards
Year	Nominated work	Category	Result
1997	Stanley	Best Actor in a Play	Nominated
