= Heroes' Day (South Africa) =

Former public holiday in South Africa

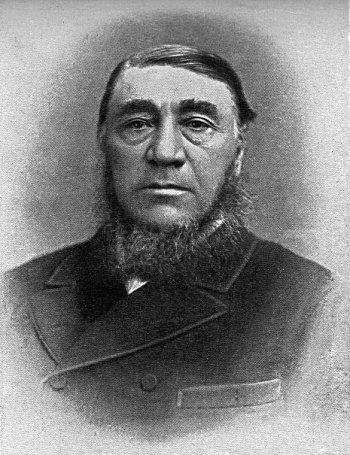
Paul Kruger, after whom Kruger Day was named

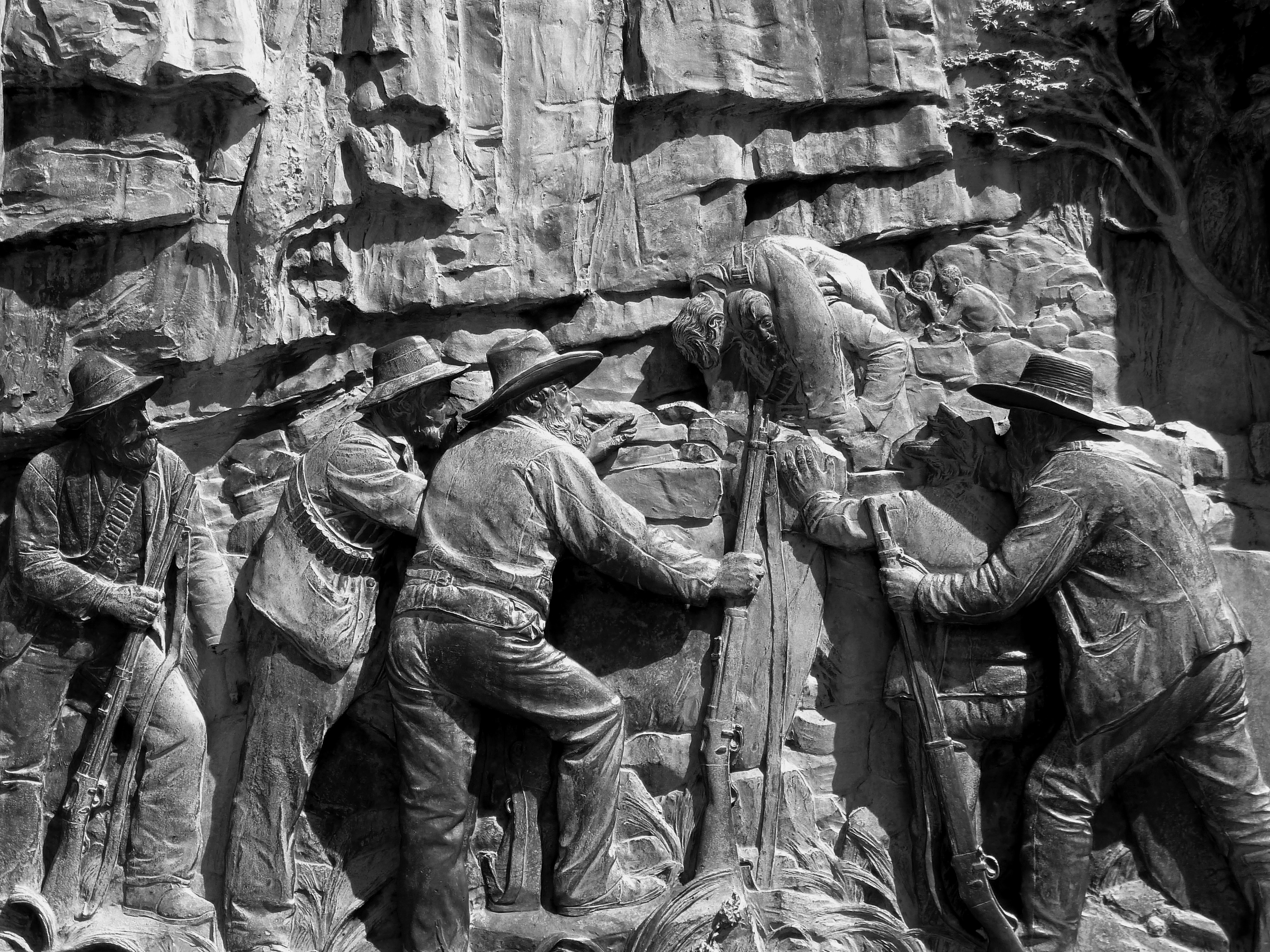
A young Kruger retrieves the body of a fallen commander during the siege of Makapansgat

Kruger Day or Heroes' Day was an official public holiday in South Africa from 1882 to 1899 and again from 1952 to 1994, which celebrated annually on 10 October. The day was named after Paul Kruger, a South African politician who served as president of the South African Republic; the holiday celebrated his birthday on October 10. The day was used to underline the values and principles of the Afrikaner people.

== Origin ==
Kruger Day was first celebrated in 1882, while Paul Kruger was serving as a politician in the South African Republic. Kruger was then the vice president, but because he enjoyed so much respect from his people, his birthday was commemorated with a day of feasting. The following year it was officially introduced as a public holiday.

== 20th century ==
Use of the holiday ended in 1902, after the British defeated the Boer republics in the Second Boer War. In 1910, with Unification, the day was still not recognized as a public holiday, though popular celebrations of a heroes' day did take place. An event in Cape Town on 25 March 1916 included a march by banner-carrying students, followed by several public addresses in the city hall.

A few years after the National Party came to power in South Africa, the day was introduced again as Heroes' Day (Afrikaans: Heldedag) from 1952 onward. From time to time, later governments referred to it as either Heroes' Day or Kruger Day. With the ANC government coming to power in the 1994 elections following the end of apartheid, a new set of holidays replaced the former ones, and Kruger Day was no longer recognized as a public holiday.

== Post-apartheid status ==
Heroes' Day remains one of six holidays in the Afrikaner enclave of Orania, and events in the spirit of Heroes' Day are promoted by some schools and cultural organisations, and held on the Saturday nearest 10 October.

== See also ==
- Heroes' Acre
- Founders Day
- Majuba Day
