= Public holidays in South Africa =

A list of current public holidays in South Africa:

In gold, the National Day

Date	Name	Instituted	Comments
1 January	New Year's Day	1910	
21 March	Human Rights Day	1990	Commemorates the Sharpeville massacre of 1960.
The Friday before Easter Sunday	Good Friday	1910	
The Monday following Easter Sunday	Family Day	1980	
27 April	Freedom Day	1995	First democratic election held (in 1994)
1 May	Workers' Day	1995	
16 June	Youth Day	1995	Commemorates the Soweto uprising led by secondary school students in 1976.
9 August	National Women's Day	1995	Commemorates the 1956 March of approximately 20,000 women to petition against pass laws.
24 September	Heritage Day	1995	Recognises aspects of South African culture which are both tangible and difficult to pin down: creative expression, the historical inheritance, language, the food, and the land people live on.
16 December	Day of Reconciliation	1995	Honors both the Black and White soldiers who died in the Battle of Blood River in 1838.
25 December	Christmas Day	1910	
26 December	Day of Goodwill	1910	Formerly Boxing Day.

The Public Holidays Act (Act No 36 of 1994) states that whenever a public holiday falls on a Sunday, the Monday following it will be a public holiday.

== Once-off holidays ==
Since the 1994 election, days have been declared ad hoc public holidays:

- National and provincial government elections – 2 June 1999
- National and provincial government elections – 14 April 2004
- Local government elections – 1 March 2006
- National and provincial government elections – 22 April 2009
- Local government elections – 18 May 2011
- National and provincial government elections – 7 May 2014
- Local government elections – 3 August 2016
- National and provincial government elections – 8 May 2019
- Local government elections – 1 November 2021
- Local government elections – 4 November 2026

31 December 1999 and 2 January 2000 were declared public holidays to accommodate the Y2K changeover, and 3 January 2000 was automatically a public holiday because the previous holiday was a Sunday.

2 May 2008 was declared a public holiday when Human Rights Day and Good Friday coincided on 21 March 2008.

27 December 2011 was declared a holiday by Deputy President Kgalema Motlanthe as Christmas Day fell on a Sunday, which generally makes the following Monday a public holiday. However, the following Monday, 26 December 2011, was the Day of Goodwill and therefore decreased the number of paid public holidays for the year. Initially, this day was not to be declared a public holiday but in mid-December the decision was changed.

27 December 2016 was declared a holiday by President Jacob Zuma following a request by the Federation of Unions of South Africa (FEDUSA). The request by FEDUSA was motivated by the fact that this year, workers in the country will only have 11 public holidays instead of 12 because 25 December (Christmas Day) falls on a Sunday. The declaration of 27 December as a public holiday, the Presidency said, will ensure that workers are not unduly disadvantaged by this unusual event and remain entitled to their 12 paid public holidays.

27 December 2022 was declared a holiday by president Cyril Ramaphosa In view of the unique circumstances around the 2022 calendar, and to uphold relevant labour law principles and practices, President Ramaphosa has declared Tuesday, 27 December, as a public holiday instead of Christmas Day. COSATU urged Cyril Ramaphosa to declare 27 December a public holiday, saying it would also show appreciation for the sacrifices workers had made in keeping the economy moving.

15 December 2023 was declared a public holiday by President Cyril Ramaphosa following South Africa's fourth Rugby World Cup title.

== Religious public holidays ==
The Christian holidays of Christmas Day and Good Friday remained in secular post-apartheid South Africa's calendar of public holidays. The Commission for the Promotion and Protection of the Rights of Cultural, Religious and Linguistic Communities (CRL Rights Commission), a chapter nine institution established in 2004, held countrywide consultative public hearings in June and July 2012 to assess the need for a review of public holidays following the receipt of complaints from minority groups about unfair discrimination. The CRL Rights Commission stated that they would submit their recommendations to the Department of Home Affairs, the Department of Labour, various Portfolio Committees and the Office of the Presidency by October 2012. On 10 November 2012 the Minister of Home Affairs Naledi Pandor told Christian protesters objecting to the removal of Christian public holidays that she had not received any enquiries from the CRL Rights Commission yet. The CRL Rights Commission published its recommendations on 17 April 2013, including the scrapping of some existing public holidays to free up days for some non-Christian religious public holidays. On 18 January 2015 the South African Law Reform Commission published a discussion document on legislation administered by the Department of Home Affairs in which it suggested "that either these holidays be reviewed or that equal weight be given to holidays of other faiths".

== Historical public holidays ==
South Africa's present calendar of public holidays was introduced in 1994. During the period between Union in 1910 and the establishment of the present republic in 1994, the following were the official public holidays:

In gold, the former National Day

Date	English name	Period
1 January	New Year's Day	1910–present
The Friday before Easter Sunday	Good Friday	1910–present
The Monday following Easter Sunday	Easter Monday Family Day	1910–1979 1980–present
6 April	Van Riebeeck's Day Founder's Day	1952–1973 1980–1994
1st Friday in May	Workers' Day	1987–1989
1 May	Workers' Day	1995–present
40th day after Easter	Ascension Day	1910–1993
24 May	Victoria Day / Empire Day	1910–1951
31 May	Union Day Republic Day	1910–1960 1961–1993
2nd Monday in July	Queen's Birthday	1952–1960
10 July	Family Day	1961–1973
1st Monday in August	King's Birthday	1910–1951
1st Monday in September	Settlers' Day	1952–1979
10 October	Kruger Day	1952–1993
16 December	Dingaan's Day Day of the Covenant Day of the Vow Day of Reconciliation	1910–1951 1952–1979 1979–1994 1995–present
25 December	Christmas Day	1910–present
26 December	Boxing Day Day of Goodwill	1910–1979 1980–present
