= Radio Orania =

Community radio station based in the Northern Cape, South Africa

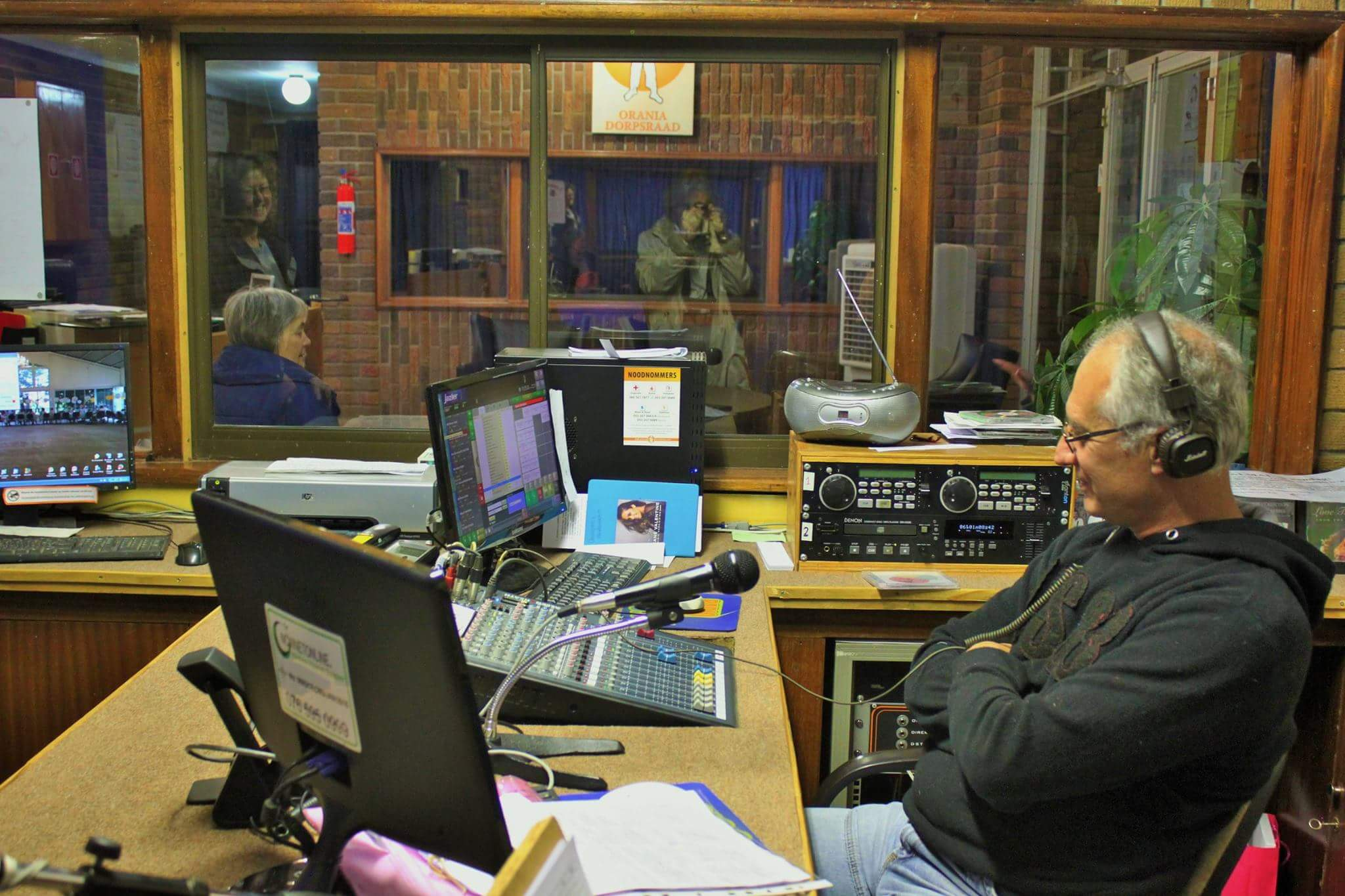
- Orania; South Africa
- Broadcast area: Northern Cape
- Frequency: 95.5 MHz

Programming
- Language: Afrikaans

Ownership
- Owner: Orania Uitsaaidienste

History
- First air date: 12 April 2008

Radio Orania is a South African community radio station based in the Northern Cape. The coverage area is Orania, a town in the Northern Cape, although some reception is possible as far as Hopetown.

Programmes are broadcast in Afrikaans language, from 5 am to 4 pm and 5 to 10 pm. The Orania community is the target audience. Programme format includes about 40% music and 60% talk.

The radio station was launched on 12 April 2008, after its predecessor Radio 100 had been shut down by ICASA. The station is staffed by volunteers only, counting over 50 contributors.

Programmes include readings of Afrikaans literature such as Mikro's Die ruiter in die nag. A 13-year-old student at Orania's Volkskool made local news in 2009, when his radio play about Battle of Majuba was broadcast by the station.

== Listenership figures ==
Estimated Listenership
| | 7 Day |
|---|---|
| May 2013 | 22 000 |
| Feb 2013 | 8 000 |
| Dec 2012 | 9 000 |
| Oct 2012 | 8 000 |
| Aug 2012 | 6 000 |
| Jun 2012 | 6 000 |
