= Disabled Motoring UK =

UK non-governmental organisation

- Type: Charity
- Founded: 1922
- Headquarters: UK
- Website: http:// disabledmotoring.org

Disabled Motoring UK is a non-governmental organisation founded in the UK in 1922 and was recently known as Mobilise. It is a campaigning charity for disabled drivers, passengers, and blue badge holders in the United Kingdom. Disabled Motoring UK lobbies the government and businesses to improve parking, access, and refuelling services for disabled people. Disabled Motoring UK does not just campaign for motorists but also supports scooter and wheelchair users, as well as the families and carers of disabled people.

== History ==
Disabled Motoring UK was formed as the Mobilise Organisation in 2005 from the merger of the Disabled Drivers' Motor Club (founded in 1922) and the Disabled Drivers' Association (founded in 1948 as the Invalid Tricycle Association). The DDMC was formed by seven ex-World War I veterans (with just six legs between them). The DDMC was a campaigning organisation from the very beginning and, even in the 1920s, it led a campaign to ensure that disabled drivers were permitted to drive cars as the Government had proposed banning them from obtaining licences in the Road Traffic Bill. It was one of the first, if not the first, organisation of disabled people, entirely run by disabled people.

The DDA began its life when the founder, O.A Denley ("Denny"), was paralysed from the waist down after contracting polio. Denny had to leave the Royal Navy and his dream to visit Switzerland appeared to be over. However, in 1947 he decided not to let his disability stop his fulfilling a lifelong ambition and set about conquering the Swiss Alps.

Starting from Greenwich he took his Argson mobility trike through France and on into Basel Switzerland. With BBC Radio 4 covering the attempt, he scaled three mountains with a combined height of 18,676 feet (5,692 m), and descended into the Rhone Valley. After arriving in Geneva he headed back to London and was received by the Members of Parliament in London. Taking momentum from this feat he founded the Invalid Tricycle Association which evolved into the charity today

== Information ==
Disabled Motoring UK is currently campaigning on the issues of:

- abuse of disabled parking bays
- reform of the Blue Badge scheme
- accessibility of city centres
- reform of Disability Living Allowance
- lack of parking at healthcare facilities

as well as many more issues facing Disabled Motorists.

=== 2011 Alps Challenge ===
From the 4th to 16 June 2011 Disabled Motoring UK, with Norwich marketing company The Lively Crew, recreated the journey of their founder by restoring the original Argson mobility trike used by Denley and following his original route through the Alps. The original trike is being restored by Corporal George Bascope and Craftsman Ben Haywood of the Royal Light Dragoons in preparation for the trip.

On 4 June 2011 the trike set off from Greenwich and headed south to Newhaven, cross the Channel to Dieppe and followed the original route. The team then headed to Paris and then on to Basel. From Basel the trike will climb three mountains, and take part in the Tour de Suisse, before heading back to London for a reception at the Palace of Westminster.

The team met up with their French and Swiss counterparts, as well as government members tasked with disability rights. Celebrities including Adrian Adepitan, Baroness Tanni Grey-Thompson and Nicolas Hamilton are assisting the team in taking the trike on its journey.
