= Ade Adepitan =

British television presenter and sportsman (born 1973)

Ade Adepitan MBE, PLY
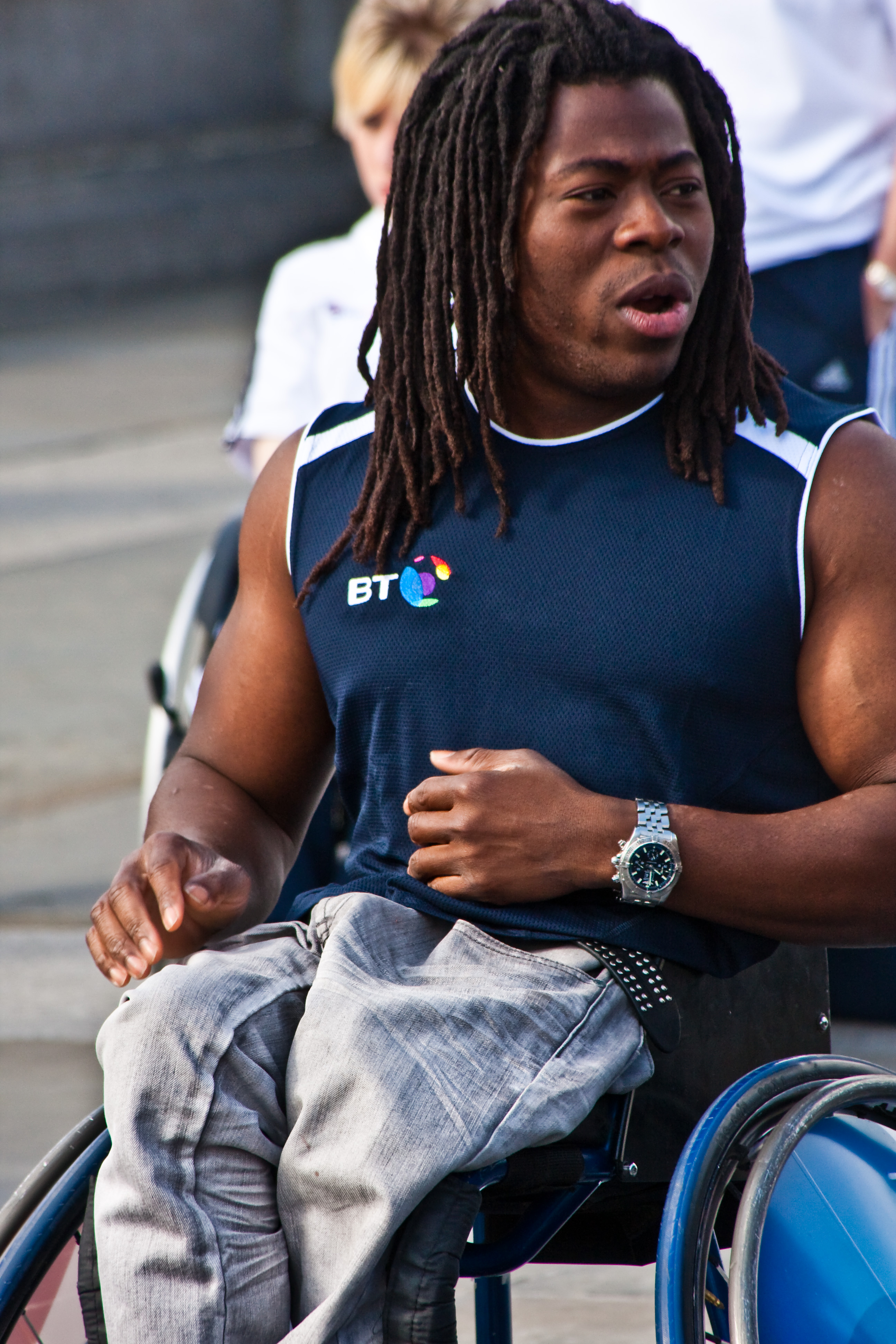
- Adepitan in 2010

Personal information
- Full name: Adedoyin Olayiwola Adepitan
- Nickname: Ade
- Nationality: British
- Born: 27 March 1973 (age 53) Maryland, Lagos, Nigeria
- Employers: BBC, Channel 4
- Spouse: Linda Harrison (m. 2018)
Medal record
Wheelchair basketball
Representing Great Britain
Wheelchair Basketball World Championship
Silver medal – second place	2002 Kitakyushu	Men's wheelchair basketball
European Wheelchair Basketball Championship
Bronze medal – third place	2003 Sassari	Men's wheelchair basketball
Silver medal – second place	2005 Paris	Men's wheelchair basketball
Paralympic Games
Bronze medal – third place	2004 Athens	Men's wheelchair basketball
Paralympic World Cup
Gold medal – first place	2005	Men's wheelchair basketball

Adedoyin Olayiwola "Ade" Adepitan MBE, PLY (/ˈædi əˈdɛpiˌtæn/; born 27 March 1973) is a Nigerian-born British television presenter and wheelchair basketball player. As a presenter, he has hosted a range of travel documentaries and sports programmes for BBC television. Adepitan is a disability advocate and one of the first physically disabled television presenters in the UK, with a career of over twenty years.

Adepitan was born in Lagos. As an infant he contracted polio, which caused damage to his legs that required him to use a wheelchair. At the age of three, he moved with his family to the United Kingdom, where he grew up in East London. Becoming a wheelchair basketball player, he was part of the British team that played at the 2004 Summer Paralympics, securing a bronze medal. He is involved in a range of charities promoting access to sport for disabled people, and in 2005 was made a Member of the Order of the British Empire (MBE) for services to disability sport.

During the 2000s, Adepitan began appearing on British television. His early appearances included as an actor in the programmes Casualty and Desperados. He also moved into presenting, initially primarily for sports programmes during the 2000s. From the 2010s, he increasingly appeared on travel documentaries, initially for episodes of the Channel 4 series Unreported World and then for the BBC series Africa with Ade Adepitan (2019) and Climate Change: Ade on the Frontline (2021).

In 2021, he was chosen to present open-access meetings of an unaffiliated scientific group set up to report to the public on the changing state of the global environment, following in the footsteps of Independent SAGE.

On 14 August 2024, Birmingham City University announced that Adepitan would be replacing Sir Lenny Henry as Chancellor of the university.

== Early life ==
Adepitan was born in the Maryland district in Lagos, Nigeria. At the age of fifteen months Adepitan contracted polio, which affected his legs and ultimately left him unable to walk.

At the age of three, Adepitan and his mother migrated to the United Kingdom to join his father, who lived in the London Borough of Newham. He was educated at Southern Road Primary School in Plaistow, which he credits with helping him with his disability and problems at home. From an early age, he had aspirations of becoming an international sportsman. He also attended Lister Community School.

== Basketball career ==
Adepitan is an accomplished wheelchair basketball player, for his club Milton Keynes Aces and as a member of the Great Britain team that won the bronze medal at the 2004 Summer Paralympics in Athens and the gold medal at the 2005 Paralympic World Cup in Manchester.

== Television and media career ==
Adepitan has featured on many television programmes and series as an actor, presenter or guest, particularly for the BBC. He often uses television as a platform to campaign against racism and disability discrimination. He was one of three wheelchair basketball players featured in the 2002 BBC One ident Hip-Hop. He was one of the main presenters of the children's programme Xchange produced for CBBC and has appeared in the soap opera EastEnders. He starred as wheelchair basketball coach, "Baggy Awolowo", in the TV series Desperados.

In 2005, Adepitan participated in Beyond Boundaries which was a four-part documentary in which Adepitan trekked through rainforests, deserts, rivers and mountains in Nicaragua, and made a video diary filmed in London and Spain, talking about his sporting aspirations and how he coped as a London boy living in Zaragoza unable to speak any Spanish.

Adepitan has become increasingly involved in making documentaries for Channel 4; he was appointed as one of the main presenters on Channel 4 of the London 2012 Paralympic Games and co-presents That Paralympic Show with Rick Edwards. In 2013 he presented a Channel 4 Dispatches programme, Britain on Benefits, as well as a documentary for Channel 4's Unreported World about Cuban basketball players, Cuba, Basketball and Betrayal. He was also part of the Channel 4 2014 Winter Paralympic Games and the Rio 2016 Paralympics presenting team alongside Clare Balding. Since 2014, he has been one of the alternating main presenters of The Travel Show for BBC News which airs both in the UK and internationally.

Adepitan has also worked with the BBC, having presented the Invictus Games, guest-presenting an episode of The One Show alongside Alex Jones. In 2016, Adepitan co-presented the three-part BBC Two series New York: America's Busiest City alongside Anita Rani and Ant Anstead. Since 2016, Adepitan has co-presented the BBC's Children in Need appeal. In 2017 he co-presented World's Busiest Cities with Anita Rani and Dan Snow. In 2019, Adepitan presented a new four-part series for BBC Two, Africa with Ade Adepitan, travelling across Africa, from West Africa and the city of his birth - Lagos in Nigeria - through Central and Eastern Africa and on to the deep south of the continent. In 2021 he was one of the BBC presenters for the Global Citizen Festival, a panellist with the BBC game show Blankety Blank and celebrity contestant of Catchphrase on 30 October, competing against his Paralympics co-presenter Clare Balding.

On 17 May 2023, Channel 4 commissioned a film in which Adepitan travels to Orania, a whites-only town in South Africa. The film was entitled Whites Only: Ade's Extremist Adventure, and it premiered on 18 March 2024.

In November 2026, Adepitan appeared as a contestant on the twenty-sixth series of I'm a Celebrity...Get Me Out of Here!. He is the first wheelchair user to compete on the show, with the camp being altered to accommodate it.

== Charity works ==
Adepitan does a lot of charity work, particularly supporting many charities to help other people with physical disabilities. He is a patron of Go Kids Go (formerly known as Association of Wheelchair Children). He is also a great supporter of the National Society for the Prevention of the Cruelty to Children Charity (NSPCC) and the WheelPower Charity. Adepitan travelled to Ghana in support of Comic Relief. He also participated in the Disabled Motoring UK Alps 2011 Challenge. Adepitan is also an Athlete Ambassador for Right to Play, the world's leading sport for development charity.

== Awards ==
Adepitan was made a Member of the Order of the British Empire (MBE) for services to disability sport in 2005. He was also presented with an Honorary Doctorate from Loughborough University, in recognition of his outstanding services to, and performances in, disability sport. The same year, Adepitan was awarded a 'Certificate of Excellence' by the Champions Club UK in recognition not only of his efforts at promoting disability sport, but also for being a positive role model. He was particularly commended for his strong and persistent message of hope within the young black disabled community.

Adepitan was presented with the Lifetime Achievement award by the University of East London in 2010, and had an Honorary Doctorate conferred by the university in November 2010.

In 2020, Adepitan was included in the Powerlist of the 100 most influential Black British people.

== Personal life ==
On 19 August 2018, Adepitan married singer Linda Harrison (who performs as Elle Exxe) in St Paul's Cathedral. They have a son, born 4 January 2021.

Adepitan is a keen football fan; he became a supporter of West Ham United as a young boy after attending the trophy parade for their 1980 FA Cup Final victory, and is a season ticket holder at the London Stadium.
