= Ora (currency) =

Local currency of Orania

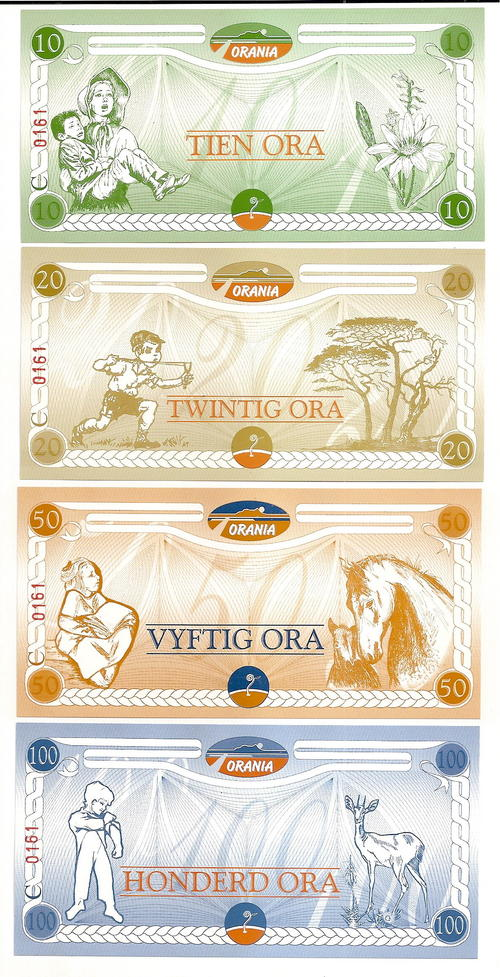
- All the Ora notes

ISO 4217
- Code: None (none is recognized)

Unit
- Symbol: Ф

Demographics
- Date of introduction: April 2004
- User(s): Orania

Issuance
- Central bank: Chamber of Commerce of Orania

The Ora (pronounced [ˈuəra]; symbol: Ф) is the local currency of Orania, an Afrikaner town in South Africa first issued in April 2004. It is pegged at par with the South African rand. The name, recalling that of the town where it circulates, derives from Latin aurum, meaning "gold". The currency is not sanctioned by the South African Reserve Bank.

== History ==
The idea of the Ora originated in 2002, when Professor Johan van Zyl argued that a community that intended to empower itself should have access to as many instruments as possible, including its own currency. The first notes issued in April 2004 to provide an internal currency for Orania as part of its goal to create an independent Afrikaner state known as a Volkstaat. Before its launch, the South African Reserve Bank cautioned that all items produced could not resemble Rand notes, under South African law.

It is printed in denominations of 10, 20, 50, 100, 200 and 500 Oras. The 10 Ora note depicts Afrikaner history, the 20 Ora notes Afrikaner art; the 50 Ora notes Afrikaner culture; and the 100 Ora note Orania itself. Each note also advertises a local business.

To encourage its use, some stores in Orania offer a 5% discount for items purchased in Ora. The local banking institution, the Orania Spaar- en Kredietkoöperatief, is in charge of the initiative. Rands can be exchanged at this bank for Ora at par. The bank profits from this due to gaining interest on the Rand obtained. The initiative is not supported by the South African Reserve Bank.

The use of the Ora as a payment method also has the effect of discouraging theft, as it can only be used within Orania. About R400,000 to R580,000 worth of Ora were in circulation by 2011. New notes are printed every three years to replace the ones worn out by use.

== dOra ==
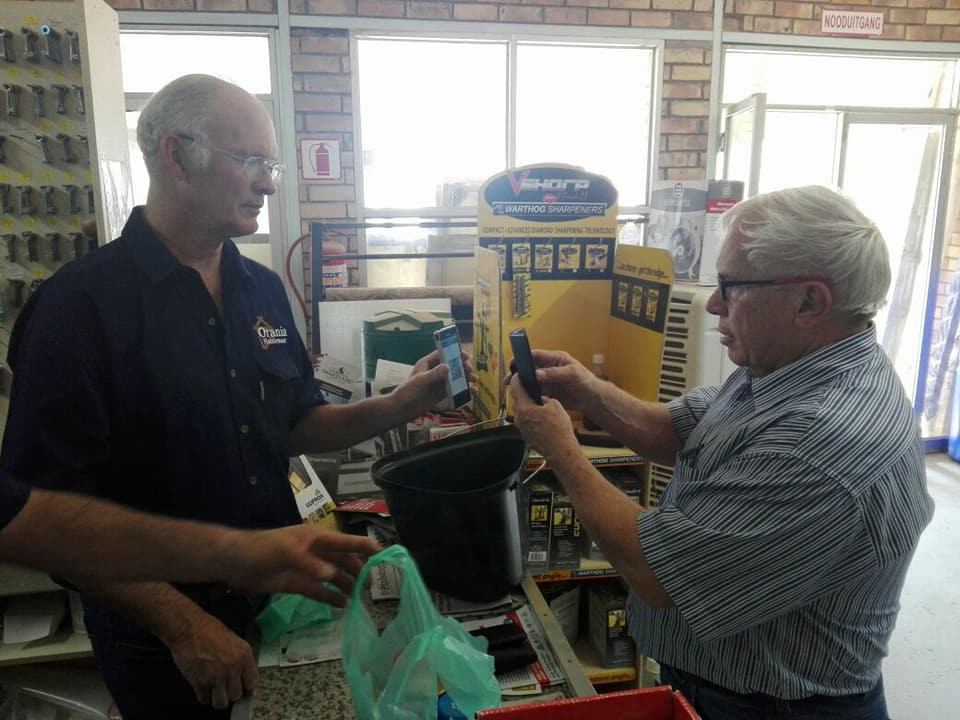
A dOra user is scanning the QR of the recipient for payment

In May 2021, Orania released the first implementation of the so-called dOra. The dOra is a digital copy of the Ora with added benefits, such as electronic payments. The dOra will not replace physical notes, but supplement those that already exist. Additionally, unlike the Ora, the dOra will not have an expiry date. The Orania Technology Group, a local based IT association, lead the development of the digitization of the Ora.

== I-Series ==
In April 2026, the Orania Business Chamber released the 9th Ora series. Elements on the notes include: "Soli Deo Gloria", a "35" to celebrate Orania's 35 birthday, Orania cultural holidays on the back of the notes, and "Ich bin ein Afrikaander slogan on the whole series. The 10 Ora note features Jan van Riebeeck the Castle in Cape town and a Cape Sparrow, the Ф20 has Andries Pretorius, the Church of the Vow and a hyrax, the Ф50 features general Piet Joubert, the Paardekraal monument and a lizard, the Ф100 has MT Steyn, the Women's Monument and a duiker antelope, the Ф200 has Totius (poet), the Afrikaans Language monument and a bat-eared fox. The new Ф500 has Carel Boshoff, the Paul Kruger Statue and a yellow vinch.

== See also ==
- Volkstaat
- Afrikaner nationalism
