= Whites Only: Ade's Extremist Adventure =

2024 documentary

- Presented by: Ade Adepitan

Original release
- Network: Channel 4
- Release: 18 March 2024

Whites Only: Ade's Extremist Adventure is a British documentary presented by Ade Adepitan, about the Afrikaner town of Orania, South Africa. The documentary premiered on Channel 4 on 18 March 2024.

== Synopsis ==
In the documentary, Ade Adepitan travels to the small town of Orania, South Africa, with his fixer, Kerneels. Adepitan says he hopes to becomes the first black man to spend a week in the town, and aims to understand the opinions of the residents. He wants to determine whether Oranians are racist, or whether their pursuit of racial separatism can "ever be justified".

Set up in the early 1990s by and for Afrikaners, Orania was created as a safe place for the community to live and work. Following the end of apartheid in 1994, more and more Afrikaners moved to the town, and its population grew from 40 families to 3,000 people.

Orania is considered a controversial place by many, with monuments to old apartheid leaders - including Hendrik Verwoerd, the "architect of apartheid" visible across the town. No black people live in Orania, and it has been labelled a "whites only" town in the press.

Throughout the programme, Adepitan meets a number of Oranian residents, including the son of the town's founder and its former leader, Carel Boshoff IV. In his interview with Adepitan, Boshoff claims that multiculturalism is a form of "social engineering". Elsewhere in the documentary, Adepitan speaks to a teenager who knows very little about Nelson Mandela, despite being South African. Adepitan is also shocked when he is "kicked out" of the town's church, and when a resident brings up the subject of Black Lives Matter, which he considered to be provocative.

Adepitan concludes that it's "too simplistic to brand everyone in Orania a racist", but that they are prejudiced. He thinks many in Orania are traumatised by the end of apartheid, and that they want to recreate their past in Orania. But Adepitan sees this as a form of extreme racial separatism, and says he doesn't want to live in a world where people are "segregated into ethnically cleansed states".

== Production ==
The documentary was produced by Cardiff Productions and Motion Content Group. In the programme, it is revealed that negotiations between the producers and the town went on for months before the town granted access.

== Reception ==
The documentary received mostly positive reviews in the press. One reviewer for The Guardian said it was "a brave attempt to understand South African racial separatists", and another called Adepitan "impressively open-minded and curious". In The Guardian's Letters, the documentary was described as being "observant, astute and shocking". The documentary also received a negative review from The Guardian, which claimed that Adepitan had failed to challenge the racism he encountered.

Following the broadcasting of Whites Only, Adepitan also wrote an article for The Guardian, in response to the large amount of racist and ableist hate he received on social media regarding the documentary. In his article, Adepitan says: "I expected criticism of my documentary, but the racist trolling and support for an apartheid stronghold was truly awful."

On his intentions for the documentary, Adepitan said: "I wanted to understand why these people held such extreme views, what the consequences were, and what lessons could be learned. I also knew many of our viewers had never heard of Orania, so just seeing the town and its inhabitants for them would be a new experience."

Aside from acknowledging the negative comments on social media, Adepitan listed some of the positive comments too: ""I had no idea this place existed. It's blown my mind," was one tweet I received. "Lordy, lord, that place is a cult-like construction site" said another. "The prejudices and worldview of the adult population is disturbing enough, but the kids who grow up under the glass dome. Just wow." "What an eye opener," tweeted a third. "It's like they're stuck in some sort of weird apartheid timewarp. Well done for seeing it out.""
