= Bittereinderdag =

Afrikaner holiday celebrated May 31

Bittereinderdag (Bitter-ender Day) is celebrated annually on May 31 by Afrikaners, commemorating the Boer Commando guerillas known as Bittereinder who fought during the Second Boer War.

== Overview ==
The Second Boer War (Afrikaans: Tweede Vryheidsoorlog, lit. 'Second Freedom War'), Which took place between 11 October 1899 to 31 May 1902, was a conflict fought between the British Empire and the two Boer republics (the South African Republic and Orange Free State) over the Empire's influence in Southern Africa.

From 1900 onwards, conventional Boer forces had depleted and the British had nominal control over the two Republics. However, Boer Commando units continued to engage in guerrilla warfare against British forces. Some Boers formed Peace Committees to dissuade the continuation of the war. A faction of Boer fighters, known as "bittereinders," were determined to continue the war until the 'bitter end'.

On May 31, 1902, the Treaty of Vereeniging was signed between British and Boer negotiators, marking the formal end of the war. The treaty outlined the terms of peace and the future of the newly unified South African territories.

In the 20th century, the bittereinderdag holiday was established by Afrikaners to commemorate the memory of the bittereinders and all Boers who died during the conflict. This holiday is observed by Afrikaner nationalists, including in the town of Orania, South Africa, which is known for its separatist stance. Orania, inhabited exclusively by Afrikaners, has alternative observances that reflect its distinct identity.

== See also ==
- Bittereinder
