= Mnyameni =

Emnyameni
- Location within Eastern Cape Location within South Africa
- Coordinates: 32°37′21″S 27°4′40″E
- Country: South Africa
- Province: Eastern Cape
- District: Amathole
- Municipality: Amahlathi

Government
  - Type: Ward 02
  - Councillor: Dumisani Gxekwa

Area
  - Total: 1.91 km^{2} (0.74 sq mi)

Population (2011)
  - Total: 893
  - Density: 468/km^{2} (1,210/sq mi)

Racial makeup (2011)
  - Black African: 100.0%

First languages (2011)
  - Xhosa: 98.0%
  - English: 1.7%
  - Other: 0.3%
- Time zone: UTC+2 (SAST)
- Postal code (street): 5670

Emnyameni is a Xhosa community in Amahlathi Local Municipality within the Amathole District Municipality in the Eastern Cape province of South Africa, situated about 13 km north-west of Keiskammahoek. The community sits at the foot of the Mt Geju and Mt Belekumntana. It is made up of two villages, aptly named the Upper Emnyameni and the Lower Emnyameni.

In December 2012, the community of Mnyameni has signed an agreement with the Afrikaner community of Orania in the Northern Cape, with the intent of collaborating in the fields of agriculture, education and tourism.
