= Orania =

- Autonomous town (Note: The town is privately owned by the Vluytjeskraal Aandeleblok company (VAB, Vluytjiekraal Share Block). Ownership of plots and houses is in the form of shares in the company, according to a framework known as share block under South African law, similar to the strata title or condominium in other countries.)
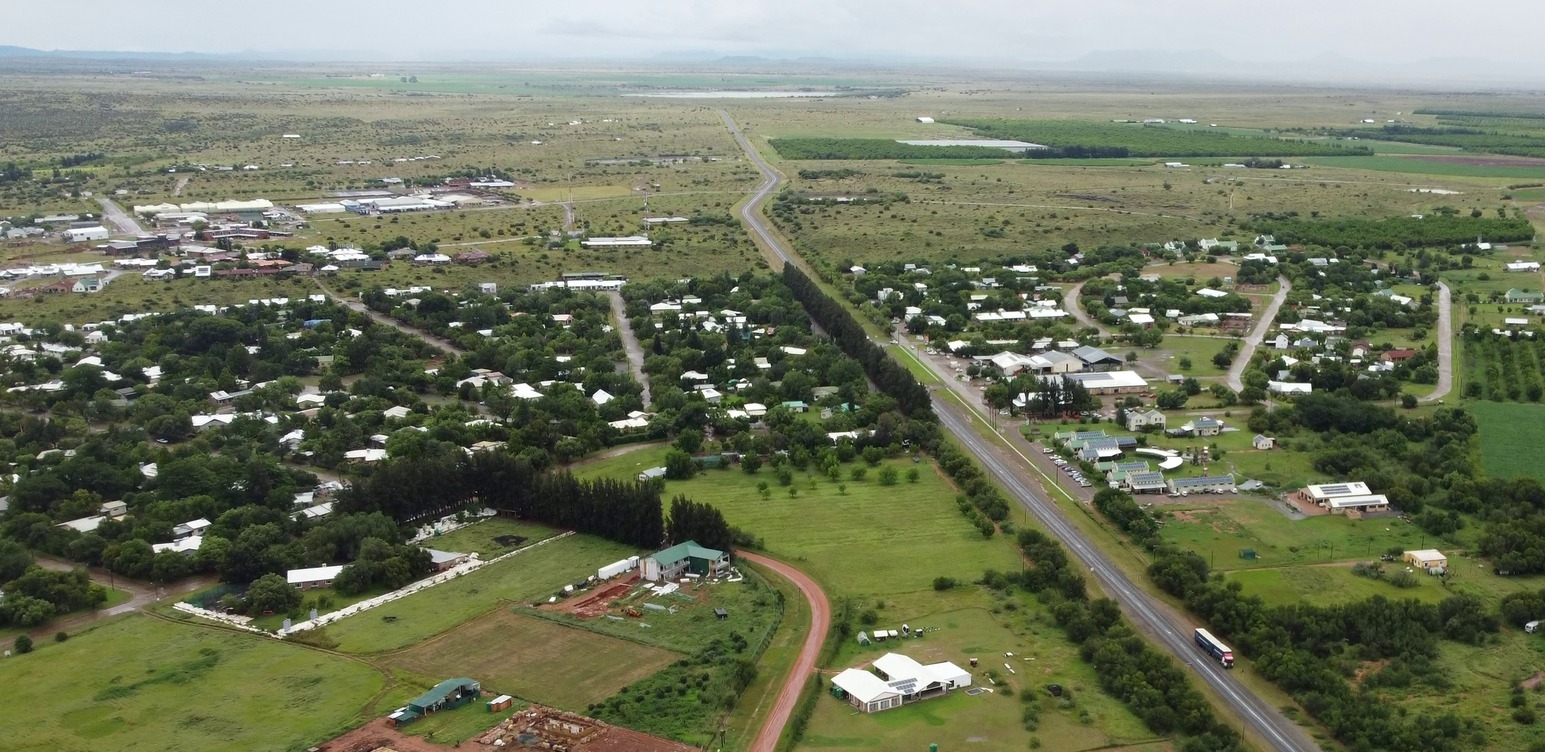
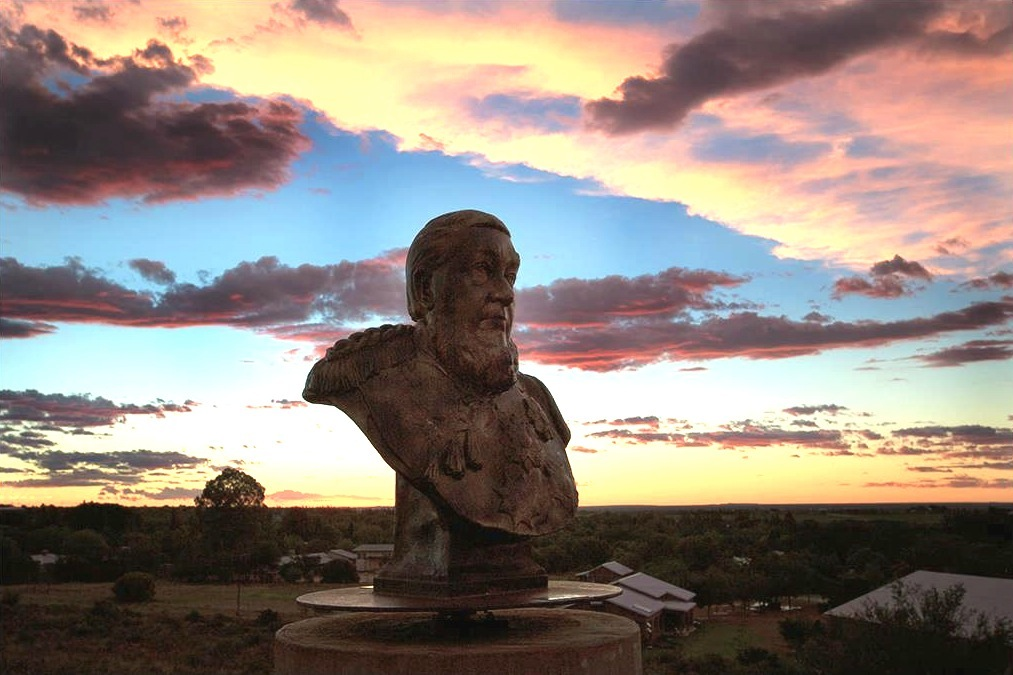
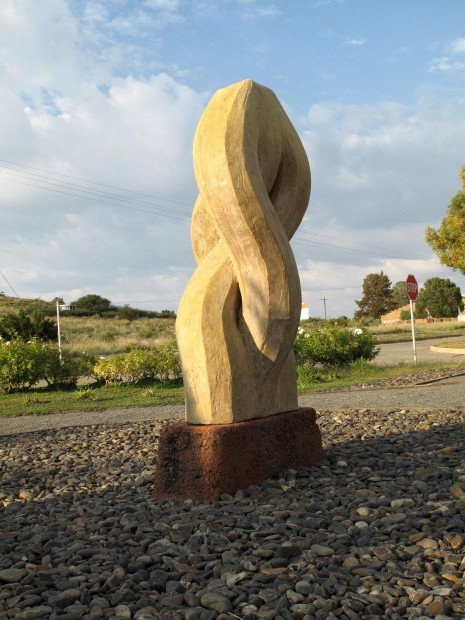
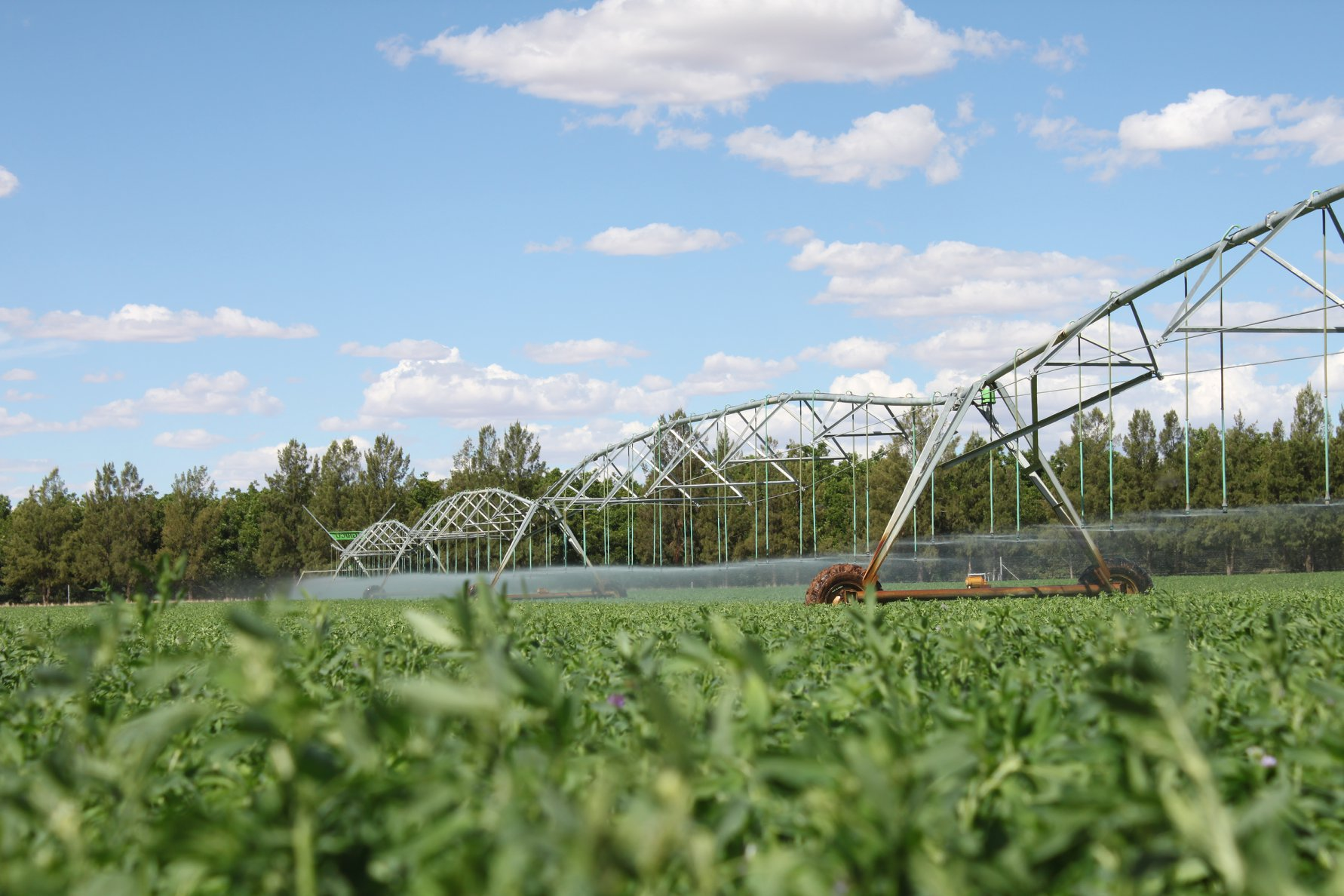
- Aerial view of the town Bust of Paul Kruger Koeksister Sculpture Pivot irrigation in Orania

- Flag Symbol
- Anthem: Call of Orania
- Location within Northern Cape Location within South Africa Location within Africa
- Coordinates: 29°49′S 24°24′E
- Country: South Africa
- Province: Northern Cape
- District: Pixley ka Seme
- Municipality: Thembelihle
- Established: 1991
- Named for: Orange River

Government
  - Type: Orania Representative Council

Area
  - Total: 8.95 km^{2} (3.46 sq mi)
- Elevation: 1,180 m (3,870 ft)

Population (2025)
  - Total: 2,903
  - Density: 324/km^{2} (840/sq mi)

Racial makeup (2011)
  - White: 98.4%
  - Coloured: 1.91%
  - Black: 0.90%

First languages (2011)
  - Afrikaans: 98.41%
  - English: 1.59%
- Time zone: UTC+2 (SAST)
- Postal code (street): 8752
- PO box: 8752
- Area code: 053
- Website: orania.co.za

Orania (Afrikaans pronunciation: [uəˈrɑːnia]) is a white separatist South African town founded by Afrikaners. It is located along the Orange River in the Karoo region of the Northern Cape province. The town is situated on the R369 highway, and is 871 kilometres (541 mi) from Cape Town and approximately 680 kilometres (420 mi) from Pretoria. Its climate is arid.

The town was founded with the goal of creating a white ethnostate — specifically, a Volkstaat — for the Afrikaner minority culture and the Afrikaans language. The town is generally described by outside observers and scholars as "Whites-only" or de facto segregated and as an attempt to revive apartheid, although the community denies this. Living in the town requires application, and acceptance is dependent upon being Afrikaner, demonstrating fluency in Afrikaans and a clean criminal record, and sharing the community's values and goals. Afrikaner Calvinism is an important aspect of local culture. While the South African government has stated that it is opposed to the idea of a Whites-only community, it has generally ignored the town.

The town's economy is focused on self-sufficiency and is largely based on agriculture, notably of pecan nuts. Orania prints its own money-like coupons which can be used to purchase in its stores and maintains the last transitional representative council in South Africa. The town has pursued energy independence primarily through solar power, constructed its own sewage works, and has experimented with introducing its own cryptocurrency as a replacement for cash.

Two South African presidents have visited the town. Nelson Mandela visited in 1995, and Jacob Zuma in 2010. The town has also received visits from tribal leaders from the Xhosa and Tswana people.

The town has grown at an annual rate that was estimated at 10% in 2019—faster than any other town in South Africa. The population increased by 55% to 2,500 from 2018 to mid-2022, and to 2,800 in July 2023. In 2023, the town council announced plans for the population to grow to 10,000 as soon as possible.

== Ideology and purpose ==
The stated goal of Orania's founders was the preservation of Afrikaner cultural heritage, and selfwerksaamheid ("self reliance"). All jobs, from management to manual labour, are done by Afrikaners. While non-Afrikaner people are not allowed to live or work in the town, the 2011 census found that a very small number of non-Afrikaners lived in the town. The town's monoculturalism and monoethnic philosophy rejects the concept of baasskap, where the White minority exploited Black labour for economic gain, in favour of a model of strict Afrikaner self-sufficiency.

Critics accuse the town authorities of rejecting the Rainbow Nation concept and trying to recreate apartheid-era South Africa within a White ethnostate.

Residents argue that they wish to preserve their own Afrikaner cultural heritage and protect themselves from crime in South Africa. They also reject the "White" label as meaningless.

== History ==
=== Early history of the area ===
The Orania region has been inhabited since about 30,000 years ago when Stone Age hunter-gatherers lived a nomadic lifestyle there. A number of late Stone Age engravings indicate the presence of the San people, who remained the main cultural group until the second half of the 1700s, with the arrival of European hunters, trekkers and the Griqua people. The earliest indication of the presence of Afrikaner people in Orania dates to 1762; in the early 19th century, many farmers moved seasonally back and forth across the Orange River in search of better grazing. Fleetwood Rawstorne's (Note: The source says Rawstone, but this was probably a typographical error and meant Fleetwood Rawstorne.) 1842 map shows the Vluytjeskraal farm, on which Orania would later be built. The first known inhabitant of what is today Orania was Stephanus Ockert Vermeulen, who purchased the farm in 1882.

=== Etymology ===
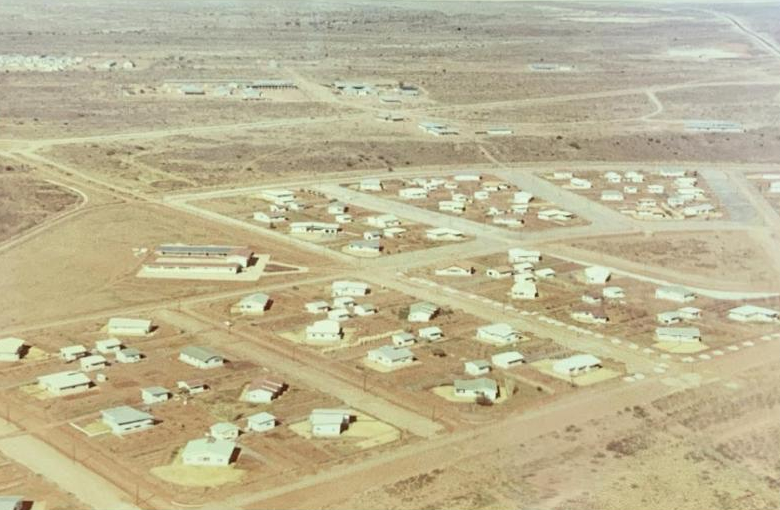
Aerial photo of Orania in the early 1970s

The Department of Water Affairs established the town as Vluytjeskraal in 1963 to house the workers who were building the irrigation canals connected to the Vanderkloof Dam. It was part of a bigger scheme to bring water to the semi-desert central parts of South Africa. Other comparable construction towns like Vanderkloof and Oviston were also established.

The Department of Water Affairs changed the name to Orania, a variation of the Afrikaans word oranje, referring to the adjoining river, after it was chosen in a competition. By 1965, it was home to 56 families. Coloured workers who participated in the construction project lived in a separate area named Grootgewaagd. The first phase of the irrigation project was completed in 1976. After the dam was completed, most of the workers moved away, and the town fell into disrepair during the 1980s. Grootgewaagd became home to a mixture of coloured and black families who squatted on the abandoned land. The Department of Water Affairs completely abandoned Orania in 1989.

=== Origins of modern Orania ===
The idea that Afrikaners should concentrate in a limited region of South Africa was first circulated by the South African Bureau for Racial Affairs (SABRA) in 1966. By the 1970s, SABRA advocated the idea of transforming South Africa into a commonwealth, where different population groups would develop parallel to each other. At the time, mainstream Afrikaners supported the bantustan policy, which allocated 174,307 square kilometres (67,300 sq mi) for the 15 million black Africans living in South Africa at the time. (See also: ethnic groups in South Africa.)

Bantustans in South Africa

In 1981, Hendrik Verwoerd Jr (son of former South African Prime Minister Hendrik Verwoerd) advocated for Afrikaner homeland in an underpopulated area of the country. He believed that such a mini-state would run on computers and nuclear energy. To support his concept, he established the Society of Orange Workers, with hopes of creating its first development. The organisation attracted 325 members.

May 1984 saw the establishment of the Afrikaner Volkswag, an organisation founded by Carel Boshoff, a right-wing academic and the son-in-law of Hendrik Verwoerd. The goal of the Afrikaner Volkswag was to put the ideas of the SABRA into practice. Boshoff regarded contemporary plans of the National Party government to retain control through limited reforms as doomed to fail. Believing that black-majority rule could not be avoided, he supported the creation of a separate, smaller state for the Afrikaner nation instead.

In 1988, Boshoff founded the Afrikaner-Vryheidstigting (Afrikaner Freedom Foundation) or Avstig. The founding principles of the Avstig were based on the belief that since black majority rule was unavoidable, and European minority rule morally unjustifiable, Afrikaners would have to form their own nation, or Volkstaat, in a smaller part of South Africa. Orania was intended to be the basis of the Volkstaat, which would come into existence once a large number of Afrikaners moved to Orania and other such 'growth points', and would eventually include the towns of Prieska, Britstown, Carnarvon, Williston and Calvinia, reaching the west coast.

Volkstaat model pursued by Avstig and Freedom Front

On 23 April 1994, the Freedom Front, the African National Congress and the National Party (South Africa) signed the Accord on Afrikaner self-determination. This led to article 235 of Constitution of South Africa, which guarantees the right of self-determination for cultural groups.

In March 2026, The Umkhonto we Sizwe (MK) Party has gazetted its intention to repeal Section 235 of the Constitution.

Boshoff's plans excluded the area of traditional Boer republics in the Transvaal and the Free State, which encompass the economic heartland of South Africa and much of its natural resources, instead focusing on an economically underdeveloped and semi-desert area in the north-western Cape. This desert state, Orandeë, because of its very inhospitableness would not be feared or coveted by the South African government.

Proponents of the idea conceded that this model would demand significant economic sacrifices from Afrikaners who moved to the Volkstaat. The model is based on the principle of 'own labour', requiring that all work in the Volkstaat be performed by its citizens, including ploughing fields, collecting garbage and tending gardens, which is traditionally performed by blacks in the rest of South Africa.

The town was originally part of a strategy to create an Afrikaner majority in the northwestern Cape by encouraging the construction of other such towns, with the eventual goal of an Afrikaner majority in the area and an independent Afrikaner ethnostate between Orania and the West Coast. Boshoff had originally envisaged a population of 60,000 after 15 years. While he conceded that most Afrikaners might decide not to move to the Volkstaat, he thought that it was essential Afrikaners have this option, since it would make them feel more secure, thereby reducing tensions in the rest of South Africa.

=== Establishment and recognition ===
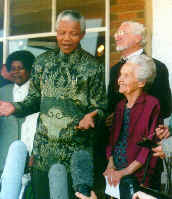
President Mandela, Betsie Verwoerd and Carel Boshoff during Mandela's visit to Orania in 1995

External videos
- Mandela's visit to Orania

In December 1990, about 40 Afrikaner families headed by Carel Boshoff bought the dilapidated town of Orania for around R1.5 million (US$585,000), (Note: USD conversion using the end-of-year rate from the South African Reserve Bank) on behalf of Orania Bestuursdienste (OBD) from the Department of Water Affairs. In the lead-up to the move-in, some 500 black and colored people still lived in Orania (then called Grootgewaagd). These 64 families were evicted by the Department of Water Affairs in early 1991, in one of the last largescale forced removals of Apartheid. The families were provided newly built homes, but were taken more than 100 km (62 mi) away to Warrenton, Northern Cape. Grootgewaagd village was renamed Kleingeluk. In April 1991, the first 13 inhabitants moved into Orania. At that time, the town consisted of 90 houses in Orania and 60 in Kleingeluk, all in serious disrepair. In August 1991, the 2,300-hectare (5,700-acre) farm Vluytjeskraal 272 was added to Orania. The National Party government led by F. W. de Klerk opposed the creation of an Afrikaner state, and the existence of Orania, but it took no action, believing it would fail on its own.

The town council was established in February 1992. A journalist for the Provinciale Zeeuwse Courant, visiting in 1993, noted that houses had been repaired, but the town lacked any meaningful economic activity. There were few jobs available, and no money for further development. The town relied on neighboring farms for food. Orania elected its own transitional representative council, a temporary form of local government created after the end of apartheid, in 1995. Construction on an irrigation scheme to cover a 400-hectare (990-acre) area began in 1995 and was completed in October 1996.

In a conciliatory gesture, President Nelson Mandela visited the town in 1995 to have tea with Betsie Verwoerd, widow of former Prime Minister Hendrik Verwoerd. Mandela was asked about reports that he had to get permission from the town authorities to enter Orania and replied: "I didn't have to ask for permission. I came in. I was not given any pass. It's not something that worries me. They are entitled to run their settlement as they like."

Orania grew to 200 permanent inhabitants in 1996. By 1998 R15 million had been invested in the town for expenses including the upgrading of water and electricity supply, roads and businesses.

On 5 June 1998, Valli Moosa, then Minister of Constitutional Development in the African National Congress (ANC) government, stated in a parliamentary budget debate that "the ideal of some Afrikaners to develop the North Western Cape as a home for the Afrikaner culture and language within the framework of the Constitution and the Charter of Human Rights is viewed by the government as a legitimate ideal".

On 14 September 2010, the president of South Africa, Jacob Zuma, visited Orania. He said that he was "warmly welcomed", that Orania had "interesting ideas", and, "the Oraniers were prepared to live in South Africa, but wanted a place to exercise their culture". In May 2023, Gayton McKenzie, leader of the Patriotic Alliance party, visited the town.

=== Evolution of concept ===
A policy shift was announced in 2014. Acknowledging that early growth expectations had not been met, the town's chief executive argued that Orania should employ its limited resources to grow into a 'city' of around 50,000 inhabitants. Urbanisation was deemed necessary to strengthen cultural institutions, deliver services and make possible an adequate standard of living for residents. However, the ultimate objective remains self-determination, similar to the small countries of Lesotho and Eswatini, which are also situated inside South Africa.

Carel Boshoff IV rejected the word Volkstaat, arguing that repeated use with no grounding in reality had led it to become an abstract term. While regarding an Afrikaner nation as desirable, he felt the word carried too much baggage, connected to unrealistic and anachronistic expectations. The vision of an Afrikanerstad was seen as a more effective way to achieve prosperity and decision-making power. The shift met with some resistance, as the Orania Movement was seen as straying away from its original goal. The movement since then promotes Orania as the "Home of the Afrikaner" (Afrikanertuiste).

In August 2023, Orania held a city planning conference in Pretoria where the new city plan from NewUrban city planners was released. The town is planning for substantial growth in the future with up to one million residents in the area anticipated.

In 2025, Orania leaders visited the U.S. to seek backing for their cause, although they clarified they were not asking for financial aid, but investment to further develop the town. Their appeals echo a broader Afrikaner nationalist movement, with some comparing their goals to the establishment of Israel post-World War II.

=== External reception ===
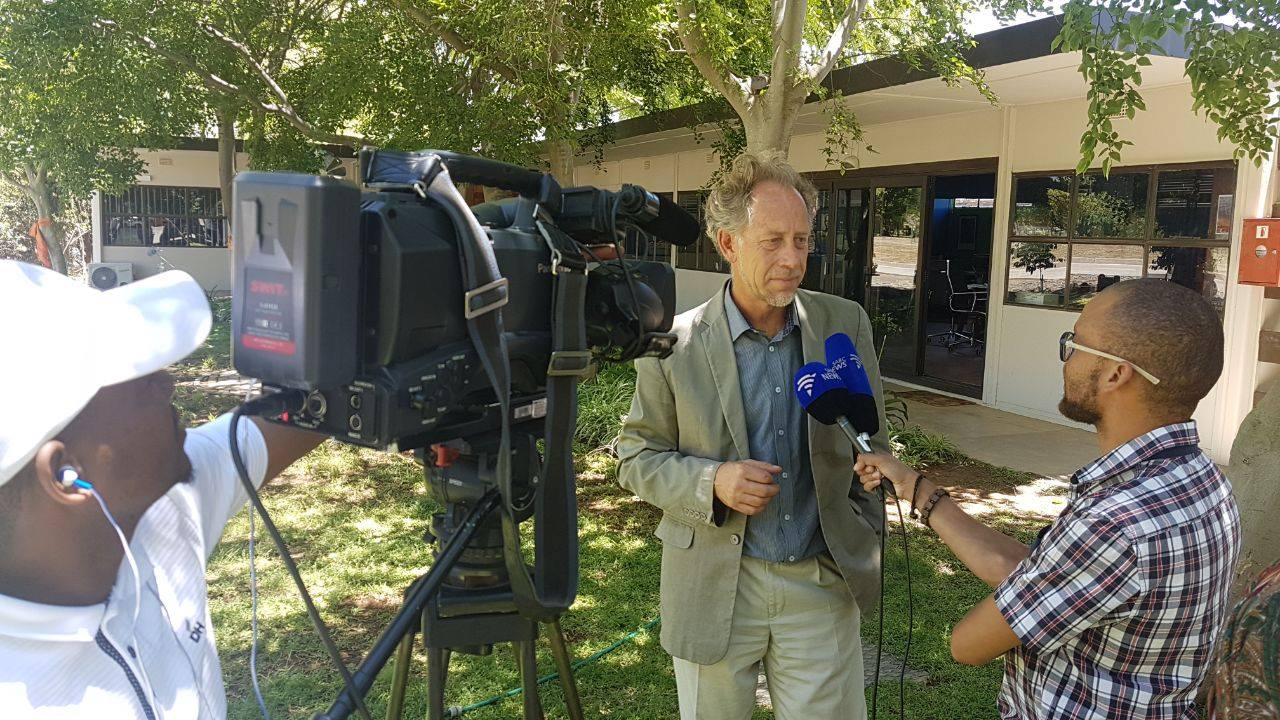
SABC News crew interviewing Carel Boshoff, President of the Orania Movement

Coverage generally describes Orania as culturally backward, racially intolerant, and separatist. Descriptions of Orania frequently call it "whites-only", since the town accepts only Afrikaner residents.

In 1991, the New York Times was not as impressed when it said that Orania was a "ghost town where White supremacists dream of carving out an idyllic homeland". In 1994 the Los Angeles Times described it as a "Zealots' Dream" and "a bastion of intolerance". A year later the Chicago Tribune saw it as "the last pathetic holdout of the former ruling class of South Africa", continuing that "the Afrikaners who once forced blacks to live apart from the rest of society are now living in their own prison". Bill Keller dubbed Orania "the racist Camelot". A Mail & Guardian article describes it as a "widely ridiculed town" and a "media byword for racism and irredentism". An article in The Independent similarly writes that residents of Orania "have a reputation for being racists, and that the town attracts plenty of negative press". Benjamin Pogrund described Orania as a "curious hangover from the vanished terrible past".

Vadim Nikitin, writing for The National in 2011, described the conventional narrative about Orania as the last bastion of apartheid, and a "pathetic outpost of embittered racists" who refuse to live in equality with black South Africans. Nikitin notes that Orania lacks some of the conventional indications of privilege found in other post-apartheid White South African suburbs, such as black servants and some material luxuries. Eve Fairbanks, writing for Witness, describes Orania's heavy emphasis on self-reliance as a paradox: "While Orania is the place Whites can go to undergo the regimen most explicitly designed to cleanse themselves of the sins of apartheid, it is also the place they can go to live most visibly like they did before it ended."

Regarding the near-total segregation of the town and lack of any black residents, James Kirchick and Sebastian Rich of the Virginia Quarterly Review describe an uneasy relationship between the town's residents and the country's apartheid history. Orania's strict ethnonationalism and anti-globalization are incompatible with both apartheid and the rainbow nation of modern South Africa. Despite this, Orania maintains several monuments of the apartheid which had been discarded from other places. The Orania Cultural History Museum includes busts of every apartheid president of South Africa except for F. W. de Klerk, whom the museum's director considers a "traitor" for his part in the country's transition to democracy. Leon Louw, the executive director of the South African Free Market Foundation, questioned the perception that the town is a refuge for racial bigots.

Gavin Haynes from Vice News said in 2010 that, "If you're a certain way inclined, Orania is probably a nice place to live. It's very neighbourly. It's also one of the dullest, most achingly pointless places in Christendom".

Professor Kwandiwe Kondlo, a professor in political economy at the University of Johannesburg, said in 2017 that Orania served as an important safety valve for Afrikaners in transition, and that "The Afrikaners are very forward-thinking people. Orania was established as a tactical strategic exit for the Afrikaner, should the new South Africa run into serious crisis. They will then have a place to preserve themselves".

Andrew Kenny, a weekly columnist of The Citizen newspaper, wrote that: "Orania was a revelation to me. I was enormously impressed by its success, decency, safety, modesty, friendliness, cleanliness, by its spirit of goodwill, by its egalitarian attitudes and, above all, by its prevailing philosophy of freedom" and "Never before in my life in South Africa have I felt so safe."

Rebecca Davis of the Daily Maverick (2020) feels that, "What makes Orania different is that it makes no secret of its discrimination. Because of this, the town has come to occupy a place in the public imagination vastly out of proportion to its size".

=== Afrikaner reception ===
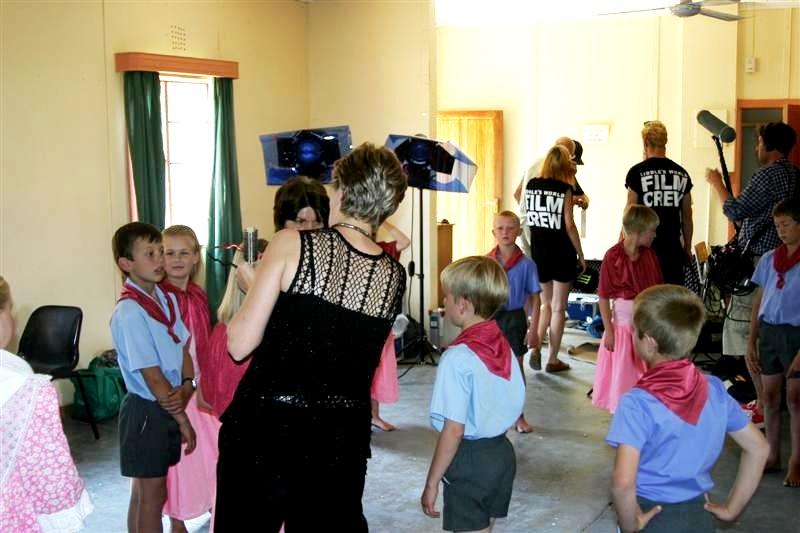
Production of a documentary about Orania

Most Afrikaners did not support the establishment of an Afrikaner state in the early 1990s, as they saw it as nothing more than an impractical pipe dream. Shortly after the first residents arrived in 1991, many Afrikaners derided the project as unrealistic, with even right-wingers rejecting it for its location in barren territory, far from traditional Afrikaner states. Two decades later, a survey of Beeld readers (in 2010), found that 56% of respondents would consider moving to a Volkstaat.

The largest right-wing party in apartheid-era South Africa, the Conservative Party, did not support the Volkstaat concept until 1993, shortly before converging with other right-wing organisations into the Afrikaner Volksfront. Even then, their plan involved separating parts of Transvaal Province, including Pretoria, to form a state where the many black residents would have only limited voting rights. Negotiations to this end were conducted with the African National Congress, but were inconclusive.

In 2010, Marida Fitzpatrick, journalist for the Afrikaans newspaper Die Burger, praised the town for its safety and environmentally friendly approaches to living, but also wrote that overt racist ideas and ideology still underpinned the views of many residents. Members of the AfriForum group who visited Orania in February 2015 came back with mostly positive impressions of the town, comparing it to a Clarens or Dullstroom of the Karoo.

In 2018, Afrikaans trade union, Solidariteit, and civil rights group AfriForum named Orania as one of their 30 "anchor towns" to which Afrikaner migration should be encouraged with the aim of becoming the majority population in these areas, making self determination possible.

=== Internal and external threats ===
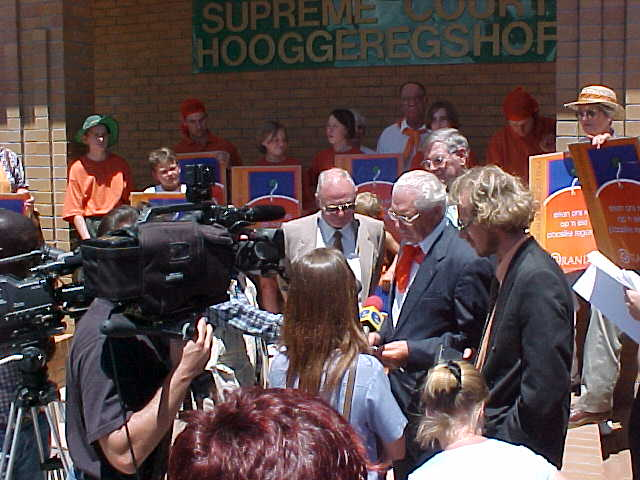
Inhabitants of Orania in front of the Northern Cape Division in 2000

Initially the presence of residents with politically extreme views hampered early attempts to gain broader acceptance for the community. Afrikaner Weerstandsbeweging (AWB) members made up a sizable minority of the population. In July 1991, one resident publicly threatened to resort to terrorism unless Orania was granted independence. By 1993, people with similarly militant views had reportedly been removed from the community.

In December 2000, the provincial government ordered the dissolution of Orania's town council and its absorption into a new municipality along with neighbouring towns. Oranians lodged an application with the Northern Cape Division, which found that negotiations between the residents of Orania and the government for a compromise on Orania's municipal status should take place; until such an agreement can be reached, the status quo would remain.

In May 2005, a dispute arose with a faction of residents who claimed the town was being run like a 'mafia', with a number of lawsuits being filed as part of the dispute. A raid on the town's radio station in November 2005 was linked to a tip-off received from internal dissenters; they ultimately left the community.

In November 2005, around 20 coloured families who lived in Kleingeluk before 1991 lodged a land claim with the government for around 483 hectares (1,190 acres) of land within Orania. It was settled in December 2006 when the South African government agreed to pay the claimants R2.9 million in compensation. In May 2026, the Special Investigating Unit (SIU) of the South African Government concluded that there were no irregularities in the 2006 Orania land claim settlement. This was part of a routine audit into settled land claims.

Some black people from neighbouring communities feel that they are not welcome to visit the town, to buy in local shops or to use petrol stations.

In 2016, prior to that year's local elections, the Thembelihle branch of the Economic Freedom Fighters (EFF) campaigned on a platform of ending the autonomous status of Orania, saying that Orania's autonomy would no longer be tolerated in an EFF-run municipality. After a visit to Orania, Thembelihle's EFF mayor, Danny Jonas, said he wanted to retain the status quo while working together with Orania for the benefit of Thembelihle. In 2009 the EFF's future leader, Julius Malema, visited Orania. In 2019, Malema indicated that he agreed with the idea of moving landless black people to Orania. In April 2025, the EFF again called for a review of Orania's right to exist and marched to the Premiers Office in Kimberley, Northern Cape.

In June 2020, Gauteng ANC MEC for education, Panyaza Lesufi, said that Orania had to fall as it is neither a symbol of inclusivity nor democracy. "We understand why that institution was established. It has lived its time now. It's now that that place must be liberated and all South Africans must be allowed to stay wherever they want to stay". He also said, "If you think we will keep quiet you are wrong. This madness must come to an end. It's a betrayal of our call for a truly non-racial SA". In response, anti-apartheid veteran and then ANC politician Carl Niehaus, who himself is an Afrikaner, said, "Destroy the money, destroy the damn flag. Charge these White, Orania 'Boere', for their racism, throw them in jail".

In January 2021, the Orania Movement made a Facebook post about how Afrikaners should develop their own sport institutions in view of government controlled sports organisations being hostile to Afrikaners. Facebook removed this post as hate speech, according to their new policy of "banning praise or support for White separatism" from their platform. In response the Orania movement created a channel on Telegram.

On 27 April 2025, Minister of Mineral and Petroleum Resources, Gwede Mantashe told supporters at a political rally that, "If I would be president for more than three hours, I would declare that people must go and build in Orania. Black people must go and build there and we mix them. They (would) appreciate that hatred can never survive peace."

== Afrikanerdom ==
=== Culture ===
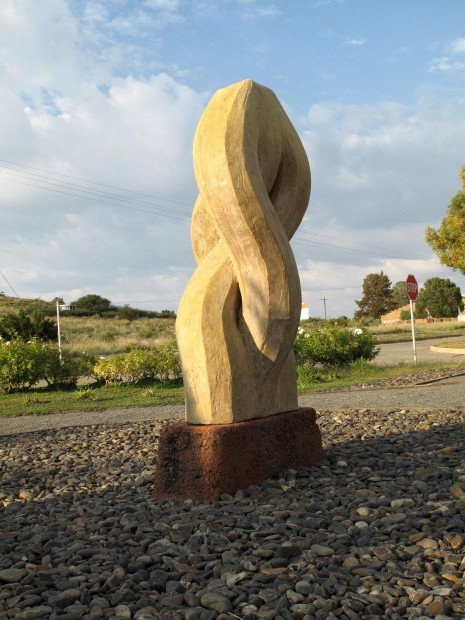
The Koeksister Monument in Orania

Cultural institutions include the Orania Kunsteraad met orkes en koor (arts council with orchestra and choir) and the Orania Kultuurhistoriese museum (cultural history museum). Exhibits housed in the museum include the Felix Lategan gun collection and a Vierkleur flag carried by Jopie Fourie. The Orania Beweging (Orania Movement) is another local political and cultural organisation that promotes Afrikaner history and culture.

The Koeksistermonument, erected in 2003, celebrates the women who baked and sold koeksisters to collect money for charity and is one of the town's tourist attractions.

The town also houses the Irish Volunteer Monument, dedicated to the Irish soldiers who fought on the Boer side during the Boer War (see Boer foreign volunteers). Jan van Wijk, who created the Afrikaans Language Monument in Paarl, designed the monument. It was moved from Brixton, Gauteng in 2002 by a group of Afrikaners concerned by its imminent demolition.

There is also a Verwoerd museum, where items and photos of Hendrik Verwoerd are on display. It was the house where his widow lived from 1992 until her death at the age of 98 years in 2000.

A collection of busts of Afrikaner leaders, dumped by institutions that no longer wanted them after 1994, sits on a 'monument hill' outside town. They look towards a statue of Orania's mascot named Klein Reus (small giant), a small boy shown rolling up his sleeves and getting ready to do the work himself. These old and new statues are symbolic of the Afrikaner's past and future. The small giant symbol is also used for the town's flag, its currency and merchandise. It was designed by South African artist Elly Holm. The colours of the town's flag is based on the Dutch Prince's Flag, which was the flag under which Jan van Riebeeck of the Dutch East India Company founded the Cape Town refreshment station in 1652.

The Orania Karnaval (formerly Volkstaatskou) is the main cultural event in town. Held annually since April 2000, it features exhibitions, competitions and concerts from local and national Afrikaner artists, with food stalls offering traditional Afrikaner treats. The Ora currency and the Kleinreus flag were both introduced during the celebrations.

Traditional Afrikaner cultural activities such as volkspele dances and games of jukskei are promoted within the community. Karoo-style food such as skaapkop (sheep's head) is part of the local culinary heritage. Like most White South Africans, Orania residents are rugby fans. The town has a rugby team, the Orania Rebelle, playing in the Griqualand West Rugby Union.

In its early years Orania offered few amusements to teenagers and young adults, who missed the entertainment offered by city life. 2014 witnessed the opening of the Ou Karooplaas shopping centre, which also houses a cinema, pizza parlor and DVD shop, as well as the Stokkiesdraai Adventure Park, which also has a pub and coffee shop.

On 10 October 2025, Orania unveiled a bronze replica of the Kruger monument to a crowd of about 2,000 people. The original monument is on Church Square in Pretoria and frequently vandalised. Paul Kruger is considered an important Afrikaner leader and it was the 200th anniversary of his birth.

=== Cultural holidays ===
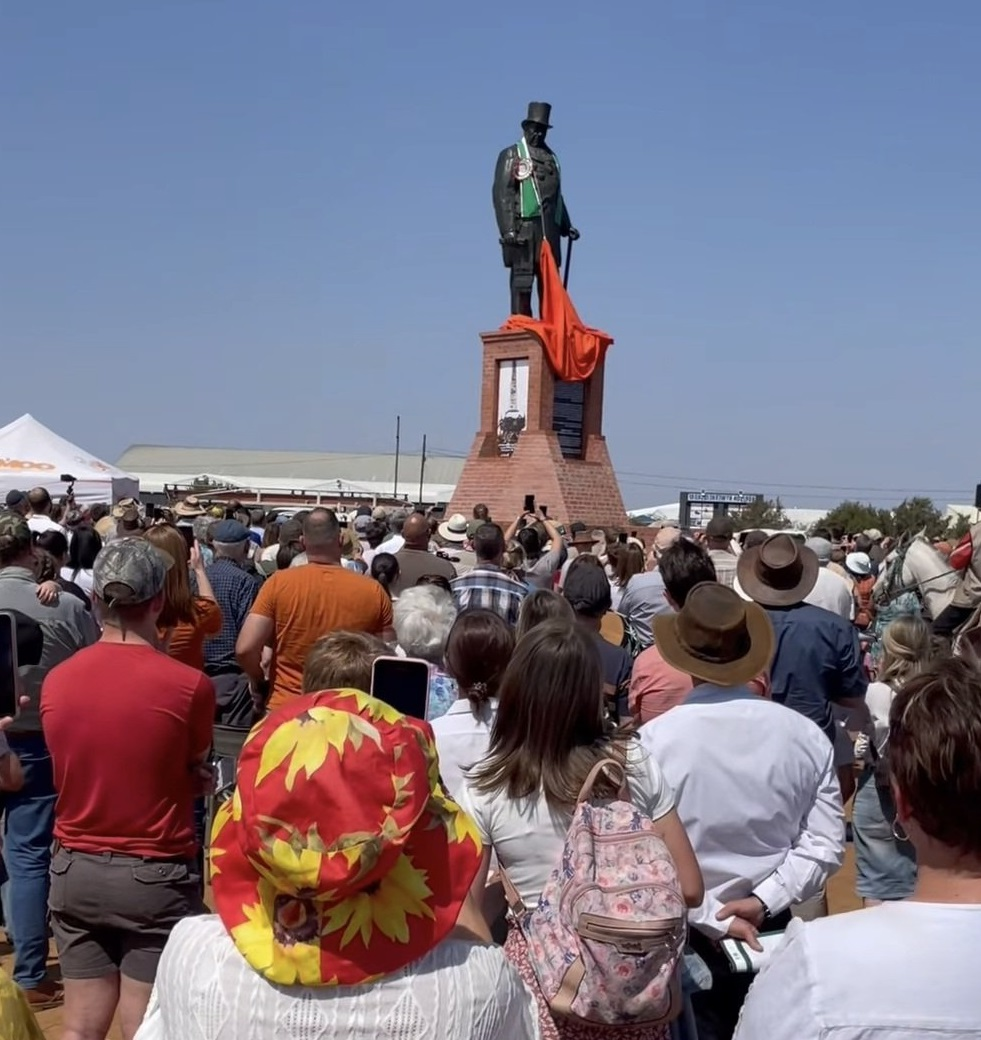
Kruger's statue in Orania, unveiled in October 2025

Orania observes twelve public holidays, of which many are carryovers from the apartheid era that are no longer observed elsewhere in South Africa. Unlike elsewhere in South Africa, an additional day non-working day is not observed on the first weekday following a weekend holiday.

The following holidays are observed in Oriana:

Date	Afrikaans name	English translation	Significance
1 January	Nuwejaarsdag	New Year's Day	Beginning of the calendar year.
27 February	Majubadag / Vryheidsdag	Majuba Day (Freedom Day)	Commemorates the Boer victory at the Battle of Majuba Hill in 1881, which contributed to the end of the First Boer War.
Friday before Easter Sunday	Goeie Vrydag	Good Friday	Christian commemoration of the crucifixion of Jesus.
Monday after Easter Sunday	Gesinsdag / Paasmaandag	Family Day	Known as Easter Monday elsewhere.
6 April	Stigtingsdag	Founder's Day	Commemorates the arrival of Jan van Riebeeck at the Cape in 1652 and the re-establishment of Orania (on 13 April 1991).
39 days after Easter Sunday	Hemelvaartdag	Ascension Day	Christian holiday marking the day Jesus is believed to have ascended.
31 May	Bittereinderdag	Bitter Enders' Day	Commemorates the Afrikaners who resisted British forces until the end of the Second Boer War and the establishment of South Africa in 1961.
14 August	Taaldag	Language Day	Commemorates the founding of the Genootskap van Regte Afrikaners.
10 October	Heldedag	Heroes' Day	Commemorates the birthday of Paul Kruger, president of the South African Republic.
16 December	Geloftedag	Day of the Vow	Known as the Day of Reconciliation elsewhere in South Africa.
25 December	Kersdag	Christmas Day	Christian celebration of the birth of Jesus.
26 December	Gesinsdag / Welwillendheidsdag	Family Day	Known as Boxing Day in most countries and as the Day of Goodwill elsewhere in South Africa.

=== Religion ===
Orania is a deeply religious community, with local churches including the Dutch Reformed Church, Apostoliese Geloofsending, Afrikaanse Protestantse Kerk, Evangelies-Gereformeerde Kerk, Gereformeerde Kerk, Hervormde Kerk, Israel Visie and Maranata Kerk; all are Reformed Protestant except Maranata, which is part of the Charismatic Movement. According to a 2014 local census, the Afrikaanse Protestantse Kerk was the most popular denomination, followed by 21.9% of households in Orania, followed by unaffiliated households with 15.6%, the Dutch Reformed Church and the Maranatha Church (both 14.8%), Gereformeerd Church (7.4%). In total, 84.4% of households were affiliated with a religion.

The arrival of Orania residents from various parts of South Africa meant that newcomers brought a relatively large variety of denominations to their new town. In the early years, all denominations shared one church building. On important holidays such as the Day of the Vow interdenominational services are held. In accordance with first-day Sabbatarian principles, work stops on Sundays, except for services that are deemed essential.

The Afrikaanse Protestantse Kerk was established in 1991, making it the first church to be established in Orania. In 2015 the congregation counted 145 members. The church is located in a prefabricated building.

The Dutch Reformed Church in Orania was established in 1999, when it detached from the Hopetown congregation. The church is part of the ring (presbytery) of Hopetown and the synod of the Northern Cape. In March 2015, the Dutch Reformed Church in Orania voted against changes to the DRC Church Order allowing for the adoption of the Belhar Confession, as did a majority of churches in the Northern Cape Synod.

=== Education ===
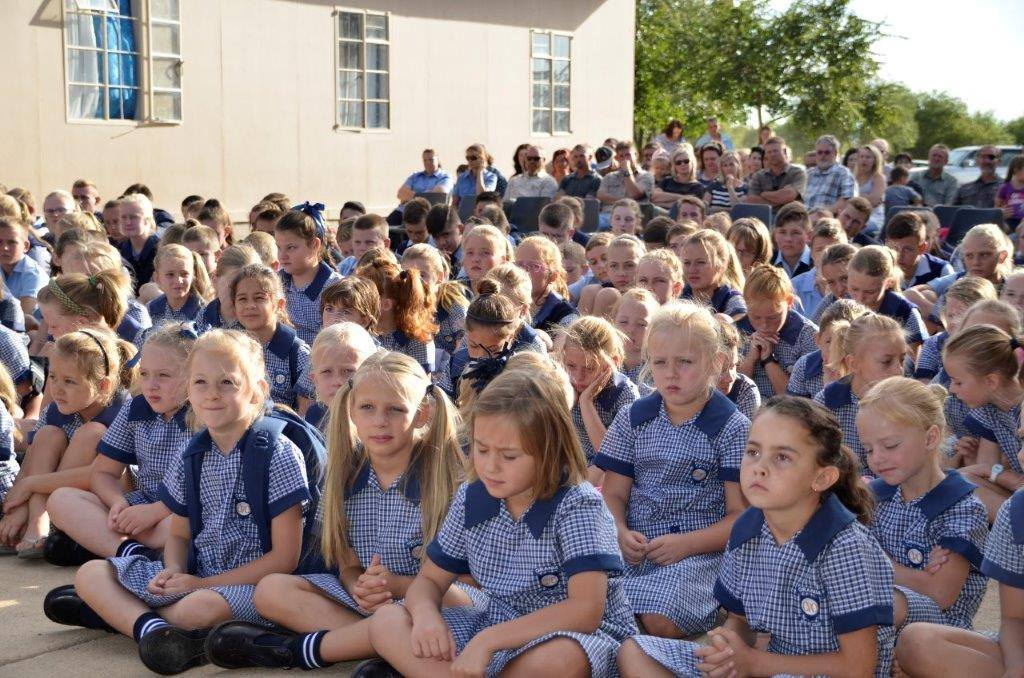
First day of school at CVO Orania

The Orania Koördinerende Onderwysraad supervises all educational activities in Orania. Orania's schools have consistently achieved a 100% matric pass rate since 1991.

There are two schools, the CVO Skool Orania (Christelike Volks-Onderwys or Christian People's Education) and Volkskool Orania (Orania People's School). Afrikaans is the language of instruction, while English is taught as a second language. Both schools follow the IEB curriculum; the CVO school offers a more conservative education, while the Volkskool is relatively more progressive.

The CVO-school, established in January 1993, is run along conventional lines. It boasts of a 100% matric pass rate since its inception. In 2014 enrollment was 225 students, with some coming from neighbouring towns. The school is growing, and had 400 students by 2021. The CVO School includes Christian tenets as a vital part of the education, and is part of the Beweging vir Christelik Volkseie Onderwys, a network of similarly minded schools across the country. As a Reformed Christian school, its teachings are in accordance with the Canons of Dort. In November 2020, the construction of 12 new classrooms started.

The Volkskool, established in June 1991 with Julian Visser as its first principal, uses a self-driven teaching (selfgedrewe) system which is unorthodox by South African standards. Because the town had few school-aged children when it was established, the school adopted a computer-based learning system that allowed students of different levels to be taught by a single teacher. The Volkskool's e-learning system was seen as innovative and received attention from South African media in the early 2000s.

There is a rivalry between the schools, which is generally friendly but can occasionally become quite fierce. Not all local children attend them, as some parents choose homeschooling or boarding schools in cities such as Bloemfontein.

Bo-Karoo Opleiding, a vocational training college, offering courses in technical subjects such as welding, metalworking and engineering, was opened in 2017. In 2019, it started the first course with 5 students, by 2025 the total number of students increased to 205 students.

=== Demographics ===
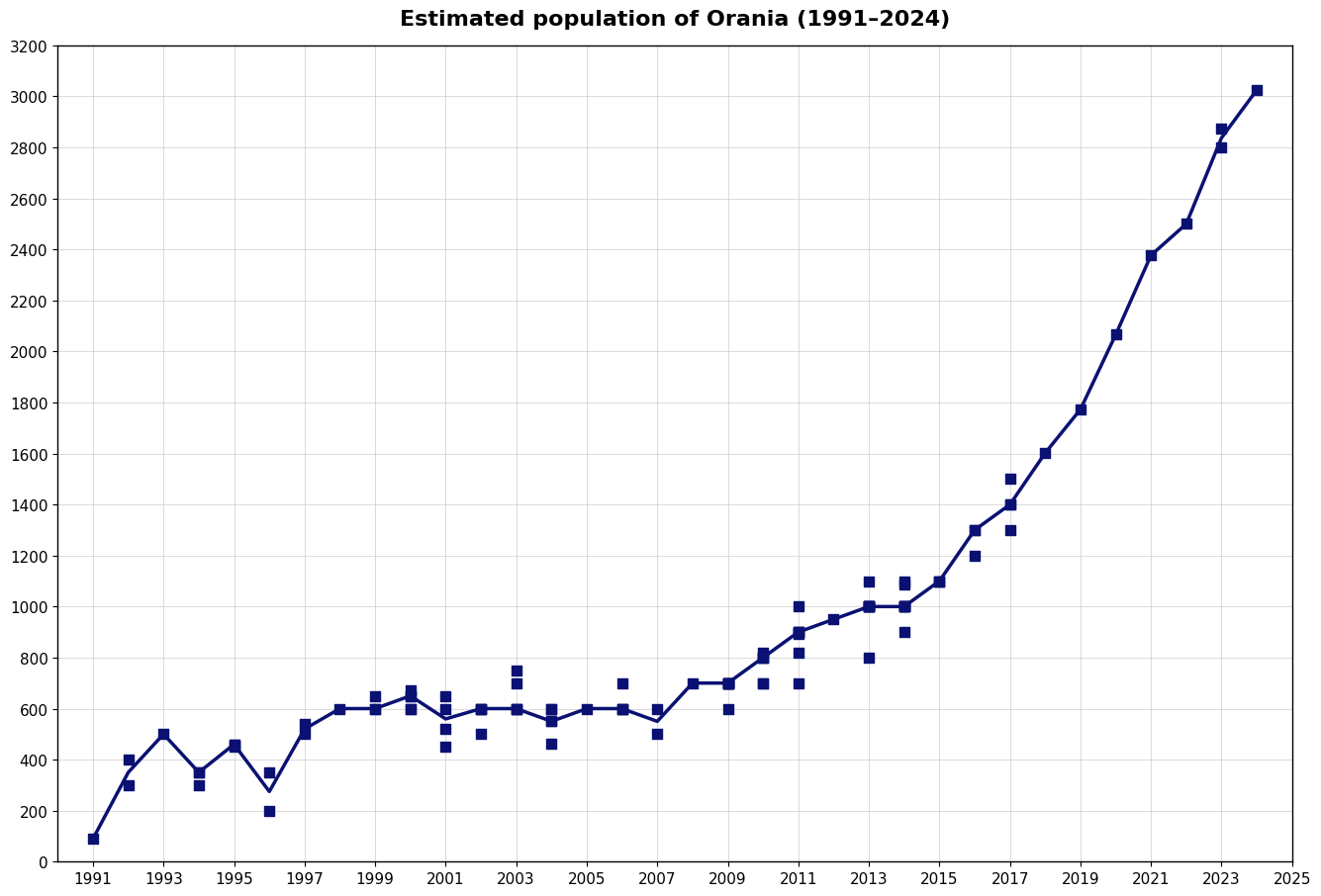
Population growth of Orania from 1991 to 2024

Population census
Year	Pop.	±% p.a.
1991	13	—
1996	200	+72.75%
2001	481	+19.19%
2011	892	+6.37%
2012	941	+5.49%
2013	965	+2.55%
2014	1,085	+12.44%
2016	1,305	+9.67%
2017	1,422	+8.97%
2018	1,602	+12.66%
2019	1,773	+10.67%
2020	2,066	+16.53%
2021	2,377	+15.05%
2022	2,565	+7.91%
2023	2,874	+12.05%
2024	3,025	+5.25%
2025	2,903	−4.03%

A local census carried out in December 2025 found 2,903 inhabitants, down from 3,025 a year earlier. Thirty-six babies were born in Orania in 2025, 71.4% more than the previous year. Children made up a third of the population. According to town authorities, the population had grown by 12% annually, much higher than the South African average of 1.3% per year.

Afrikaners were the main population group at the time of the 2011 census, representing 97% of the total. Male residents outnumbered females 60% to 40% in 2011. Afrikaans is the primary language used in most spheres of local life, though English is also widely understood as a second language. According to a 2014 census carried out by town authorities, Afrikaans is the main language spoken at home for 95% of residents, followed by English with 2%, with speakers of both English and Afrikaans making up the remaining 3%.

According to the 2011 census, 97.2% of the population of Orania was White.

== Economy ==
=== General ===
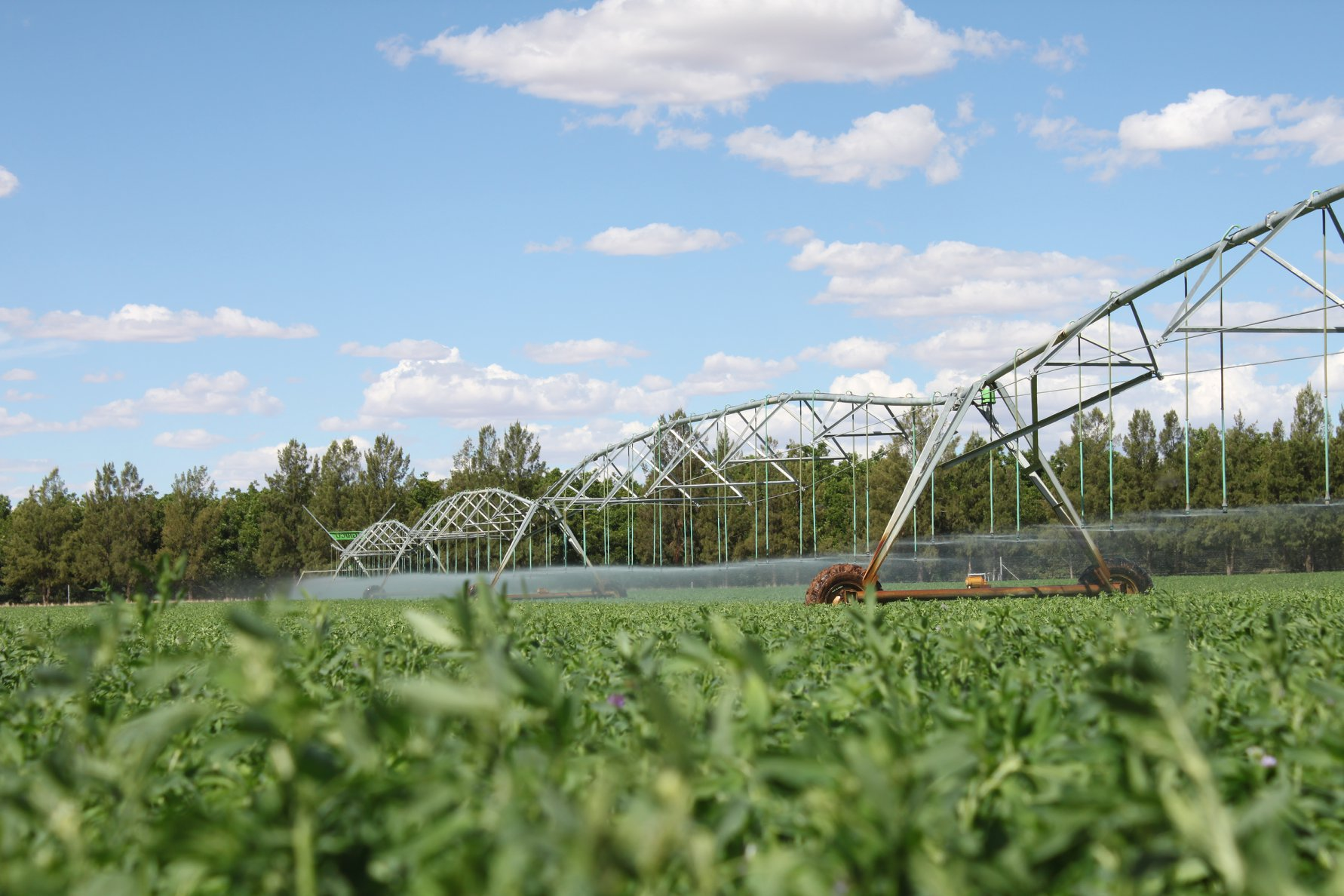
Pivot irrigation is supplied with water from the Orange River.

About 244 businesses were registered in Orania in 2019, and town leaders reported annual economic growth in excess of 11%.

In 2019 Orania's workforce was employed as follows: 269 service providers, 140 traders, 76 construction workers, 19 hospitality providers, 12 manufacturers, 66 in education, 27 agricultural service providers. The town hosts diverse industries, from macadamia farming, a toffee factory, a brewery, a call centre, stockbroking services, architecture, construction, etc. Previously, a permit was required to start new businesses in town, which was only granted if the new business did not compete with existing ones. The permit system proved unworkable, causing dissatisfaction among the residents, and was abolished.

The average wage in Orania was estimated at R94,036 per annum in 2019, low by White South African standards. The lack of cheap labour means that living in Orania is more expensive than the rest of South Africa; at the same time, unskilled workers are scarce. In 2016, CNN reported the unemployment rate in Orania to be 2%.

In Orania people from all levels of society perform their own manual labour. Local Afrikaners also work in unskilled positions such as gardening and waste collection. In 2009, 14% of the population was self-employed. Rapid growth over the four years to 2014 led to the construction of new commercial developments and a rising number of young adult immigrants, but also caused an increase in class differences between residents.

Orania also has a tourism industry. As of 2010, thirteen independent hospitality businesses operated in the town. From October 2012 to February 2013, about 2,000 holidaymakers visited the town.

The Orania Chamber of Commerce was established in 2001. The Orania Spaar- en Kredietkoöperatief (Orania Savings and Credit Co-operative) is a local cooperative bank. It registered with the South African Reserve Bank in 2011, and in 2013 it had R45 million in savings deposits. During April 2004, Orania launched its own monetary system, called the Ora, based on the idea of discount shopping vouchers. Orania launched its own chequebook in 2007. The enclave is currently working to introduce the e-Ora, a digital version of the currency that is currently in circulation.

Orania has its own currency, the Ora, which is not sanctioned by the South African Reserve Bank and is referred as a coupon system by the Orania Chamber of Commerce. The Ora is pegged to the Rand and it was introduced to stimulate the circulation of money inside Orania and prevent theft. The Orania Chamber of Commerce, which issues the currency, uses the Rands deposited by the residents to earn interest. In 2021, the Dora, a digital version of the Ora, was introduced. The Dora did not replace the paper bills and, unlike them, it does not have an expiration date.

=== Agriculture ===
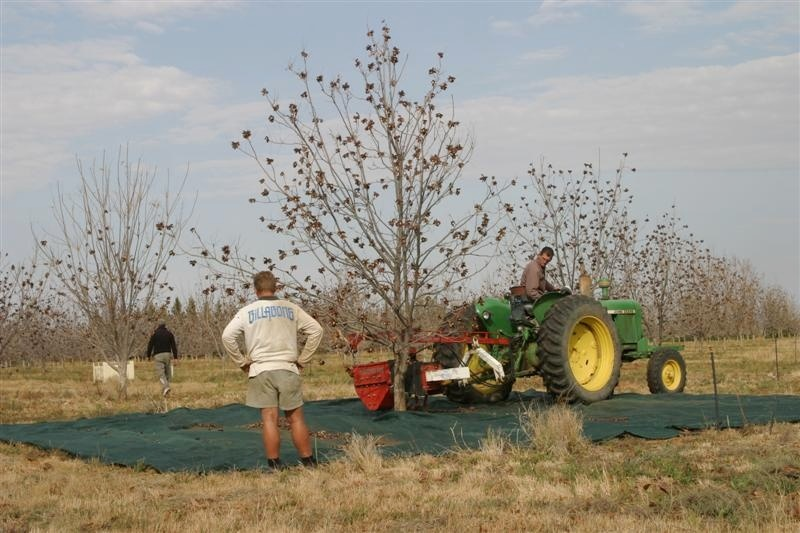
Pecan harvest in Orania

Farming is an important part of Orania's economy, the most prominent project being a massive pecan nut plantation. The plantation is said to have given Orania a substantial economic boost. Most of the agricultural production is exported to China. Since purchasing the 430-hectare (1,100-acre) town, the community has added 7,000 hectares (17,000 acres) of agricultural land to it. A pumping station on the Orange River, financed and built by the town's residents, provides water for agricultural use. The station is connected to a 9-kilometre (5.6 mi) pipeline.

A R9 million dairy farm, the Bo-Karoo Suiwel, operated in Orania from 1998 to 2002. Though deemed one of the most modern dairies in South Africa at the time, the increased cost of imported machinery caused by a decline in value of the rand combined with a rise in the price of corn used to feed cattle led to its liquidation. Another ambitious project, a mill processing a range of corn products, was completed in 2005, but also proved unsuccessful and was closed down. The Orania management has since mostly eschewed large-scale projects, rather focussing on small- and micro-enterprises to develop the local economy.

=== Construction ===
The construction industry is an important element of the local economy. Orania counts 8 construction companies as of 2017. During 2020 the town set out and serviced 100 new stands, and has enough land available for a further 4200 erven, according to Frans De Klerk (head of the Orania Development Company.

The shortage of affordable housing is a significant problem in Orania. Given the relatively low local wages, even two mid-range salaries might not be enough to buy a house. Outside investors, who can afford to pay more using savings from previous employment outside Orania, inflate housing prices. While buildings from the Water Works era can rely on pre-existing utility connections, new builds face the additional cost of installing infrastructure, raising prices further. In 2010, property prices ranged from R250,000 at the low-end, up to R900,000 for new riverfront property. By 2020, property prices ranged from R420,000 at the low-end, up to R2,900,000 for a detached house. Average house prices in Orania have grown by 13.9% a year from 1992 to 2006.

=== Environmental practices ===
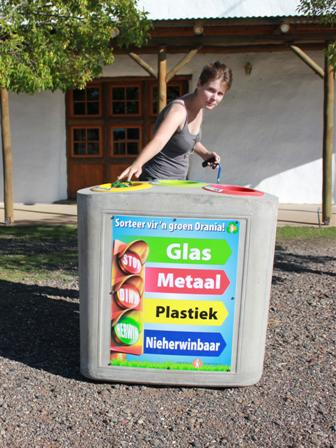
Recycling bins in Orania

Town authorities have a strong focus on green practices, including recycling and conservation. Solar water heaters are a requirement for all new houses built in Orania. Between 1991 and 2022, over 35,000 trees were planted in Orania. In 2013, the Sonskip / Aardskip earthship living museum construction started in Orania, designed by Christiaan van Zyl, one of South Africa's foremost experts on sustainable architecture. The building is open to the public as a living museum; it is the largest earthbag earthship in the world.

In 2014 Orania introduced a bicycle-sharing system, called the Orania Openbare Fietsprojek (Orania Public Bicycle Project). In 2022, it was reported that the construction of a 900 kW solar energy plant was completed in Orania with the aim being energy independence. The plant is owned by the town's council, which sells the electricity generated from solar to residents at the same price as Eskom to fund future expansion. In April 2024, Orania took possession of a 4.8 MWh BESS battery to power the town during rolling blackouts. In the same year, an audit of 18 landfill sites in the Northern Cape found that Orania's dump is the only one in the Northern Cape that was compliant with government national standards. In 2022, Orania completed its new sewage works in anticipation of 10,000 residents.

== Administration ==
=== Private company ===
The town is privately owned by the Vluytjeskraal Aandeleblok company (VAB, Vluytjiekraal Share Block). Ownership of plots and houses is in the form of shares in the company, according to a framework known as 'share block' under South African law, similar to the strata title or condominium in other countries. No title deeds are provided, except for agricultural land. Share blocks are linked to portions of the company's real estate property, and the shareholder acquires the right to use property linked to their share block.

A general meeting of shareholders is held every year. The shareholders, numbering about 400 as of 2017, vote for the company's board of directors. The eight people on the board of directors form the village council (Dorpsraad). The board of directors elects a chairperson, who serves as the town's mayor, and an executive officer who is responsible for the daily administration of the town. Other members of the board are given responsibility for community matters such as safety, planning and community services.

In September 2022, the Shareblock Company confirmed that Orania received its 31st clean and unqualified municipal audit.

Parts of the community are critical of the share block arrangement, as it offers no effective representation to people who rent their house, and thus are not shareholders in the company. Even shareholding residents feel they have only a limited say in the management of Orania.

Vluytjeskraal functions like a municipal administration, being funded by rates and delivering services like water, electricity and waste management. Utility companies like Eskom and Telkom provide services to this private entity, which then splits the costs and charges the end users. The budget for the fiscal year 2006/2007 was R2.45 million. Harry Theron is the company chairman as of 2018; Frans de Klerk is the chief executive officer.

Kambrolandskap Koöperatief is a separate legal entity acquiring land on Orania's behalf. It owns land plots in share blocks, just like Vluytjeskraal Aandeleblok.

=== Democratic institutions ===
The Orania Verteenwoordige Raad (OVR, Orania Representative Council) is an elected institution, tasked with handling Orania's political interests in negotiations on the provincial and national levels. It is the last transitional representative council extant in South Africa. The Representative Council is elected by all residents, including those who own no shares in the company.

Orania has its own municipal structure in the form of the Orania Representative Council based on the Local Government Transition Act of 1993, where other municipalities are based on the Municipal Structures Act of 1998. This legal framework was laid down in 2000 when an agreement between the Cabinet of South Africa, the Northern Cape government and the Orania Representative Council was reached about a provisional status for Orania. This agreement was confirmed by a ruling of the Northern Cape High Court.

Orania residents are eligible to vote in the Thembelihle municipal elections, but few choose to do so.

The Boshoff family are regarded as the 'political elite' of Orania. They are generally seen as being relatively more liberal than most of the town's other residents.

=== Subdivisions and architecture ===
Map of Orania, showing the private entities owning the town's territory

Orania has three residential areas: Kleingeluk ("small happiness"), Grootdorp ("big village") and Orania Wes ("Orania West"). Kleingeluk is a separate district about 1.5 kilometres (0.93 mi) from Grootdorp, and is poorer than the main town, although progress has been made in narrowing the gap in living conditions.

Many houses in Orania are built in the Cape Dutch architectural style. Most of the original buildings from the water department era are prefabricated, and while some have been renovated others show signs of deterioration, as they were not designed to last more than 20 years. A City Press reporter wrote in 2013 that "none of the town's buildings are impressive".

=== Territorial extension ===
The town's territory originally covered 300 hectares (740 acres), and was expanded through a number of land acquisitions.

In August 1991, the 2,300-hectare (5,700-acre) farm Vluytjeskraal 272 was added to Orania. It was divided into smaller farmsteads, and now grows pecan nuts, olives and fruit.

Kambro Landbou Koöperatief is a legal entity established to buy land on Orania's behalf. In 2004–2005, the purchase of two farms located 20 kilometres (12 mi) south of Orania, Nooitgedacht and Biesiebult, added 4,000 hectares (9,900 acres) to the town's territory. Biesiebult is a pasture, covering 2,300 hectares (5,700 acres), and is used as grazing land for cattle. Nooitgedacht is a riverfront farm, located between Orania and Vanderkloof. It is used mostly for agriculture, with a smaller built-up area along the river bank. Kambro also own a 380 hectares (940 acres) farm west of Orania. The Masada farmhouse opposite Orania, about 150 hectares (370 acres), was bought and proclaimed as an eco-park.

Farm Vluytjeskraal Noord was bought by a group of Orania residents in 2011. Vygiesvlakte is a 2,600 hectares (6,400 acres) farm on the West Coast, near Groenriviermond. It was purchased around 2012. After the Vluytjeskraal Noord purchase, the town administration decided that developing the infrastructure of existing land should be the priority, though new land acquisitions were not ruled out.

=== Application process ===
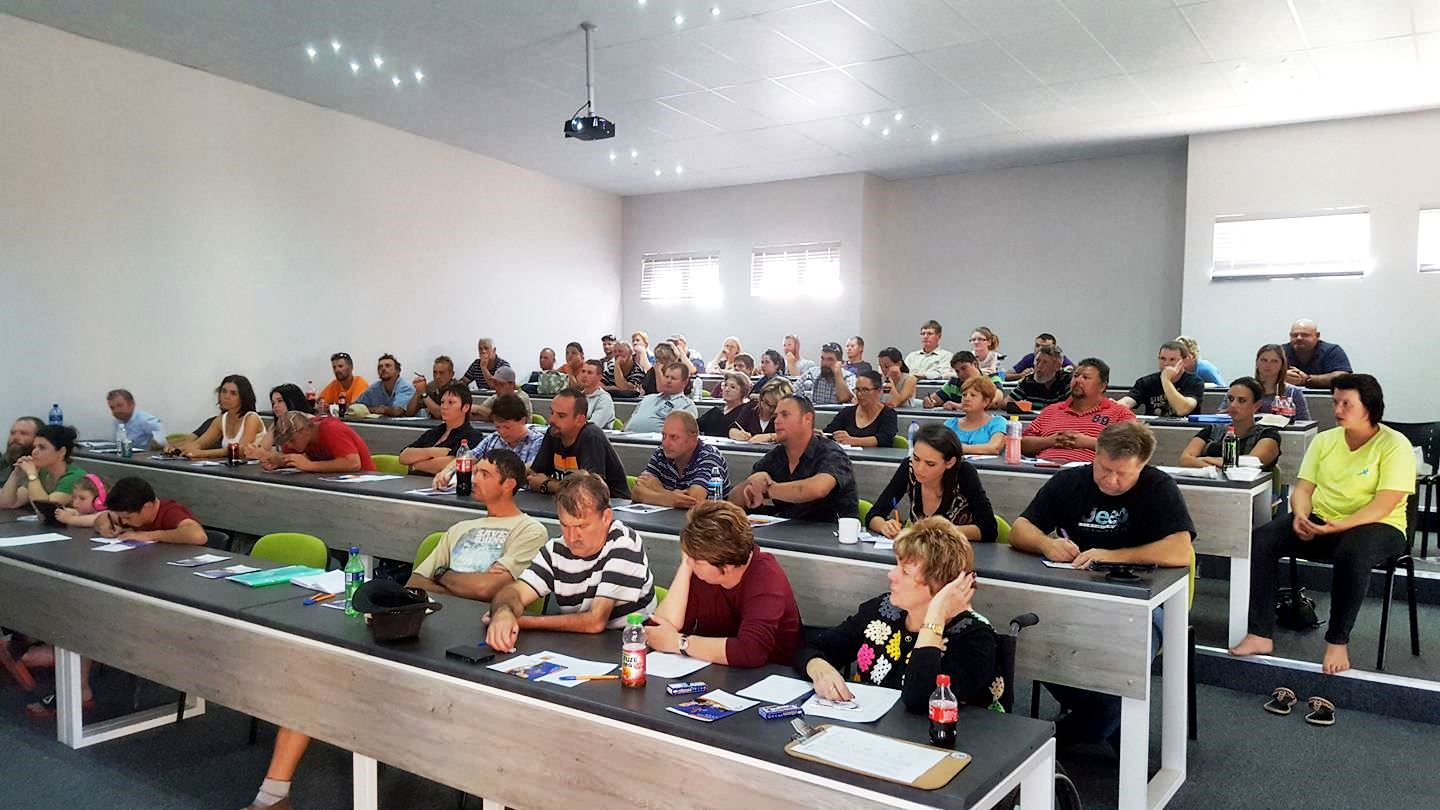
Orientation meeting for new residents

Prospective residents are required to go through an interview process with a committee, which may deny access to people based on criteria such as criminal records. Once permission is granted, the new residents become members of the community, either as shareholders if they buy property, or as tenants.

Being an Afrikaner is the most important criterion for admission. Although the town has no formal statute barring admission based on race, which would violate South Africa's constitution, in practice only White Afrikaners are admitted. Though the community is not supportive of same-sex relationships, some gay people do live in Orania. Unmarried couples living together are also frowned upon.

Some people who try to live in Orania leave due to the limited choice of available jobs or the requirement to conform to local social norms. According to a 2004 study, 250 people had left Orania since its establishment in 1991, most of them due to "physical and social pressure". The difference in lifestyle compared to an urban environment is another factor that negatively impacts newcomers.

=== Social welfare ===
Orania receives no fiscal contributions from either state or provincial government and must generate all funds itself.

Orania has a 3-step program of dealing with destitute Afrikaner arrivals: stabilisation, rehabilitation and integration. First they are supplied with housing, next work, and then land at 10% of market value + interest-free loans from the local co-operative bank for the construction of a house.

The Helpsaam Fund, a non-profit institution, raises money for projects like subsidised housing for newcomers in need. The Elim Centre accommodates unemployed young men who come to Orania seeking employment. Most are destitute when they arrive. They are usually given work with the municipality or local farms, and provided with training. Nerina, the equivalent residential complex for women, was completed in July 2012.

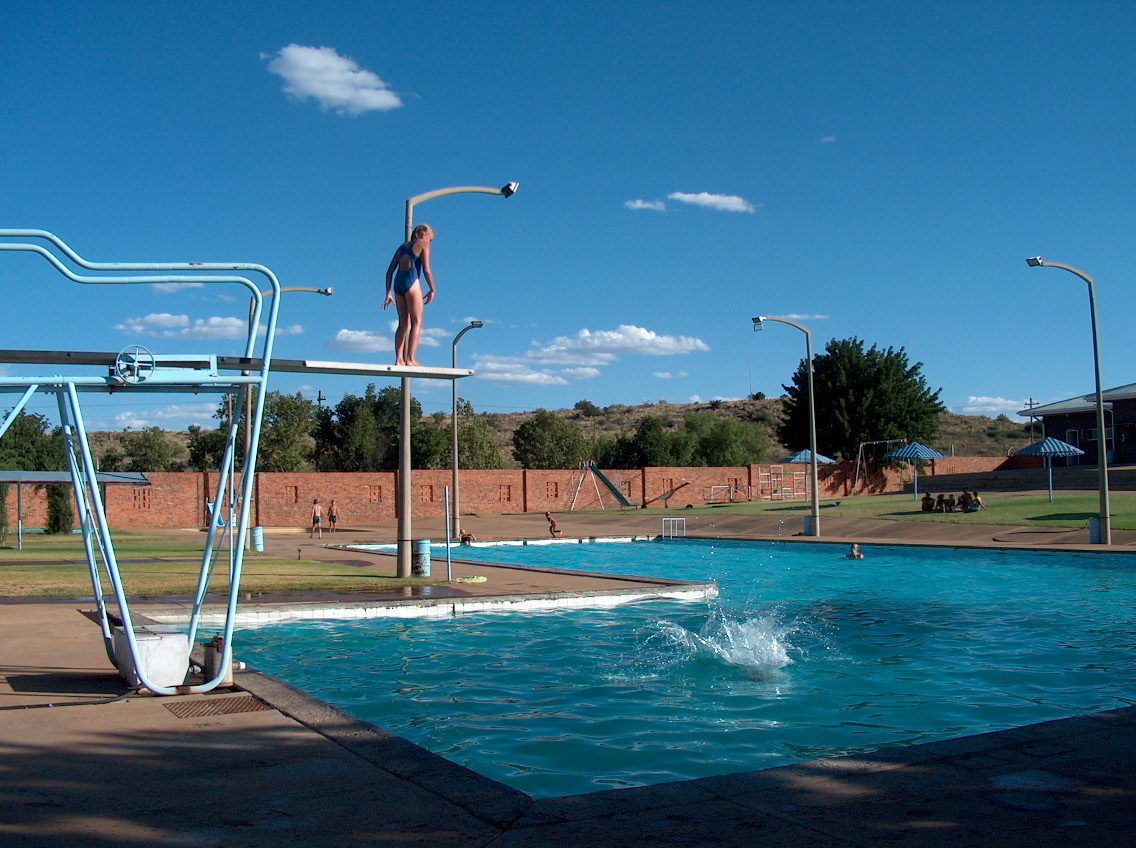
The Gemeenskapswembad, a public swimming pool

In 2013, Orania had a small clinic, and a government-funded nurse visited twice a month. By 2020, the town had a doctor, a physiotherapist, a radiographer, and a pharmacist according to Frans De Klerk, head of the Orania Development Company. The town has two airstrips, one 1,300 metres (4,300 ft) and the other 1,000 metres (3,300 ft).

=== Law enforcement ===
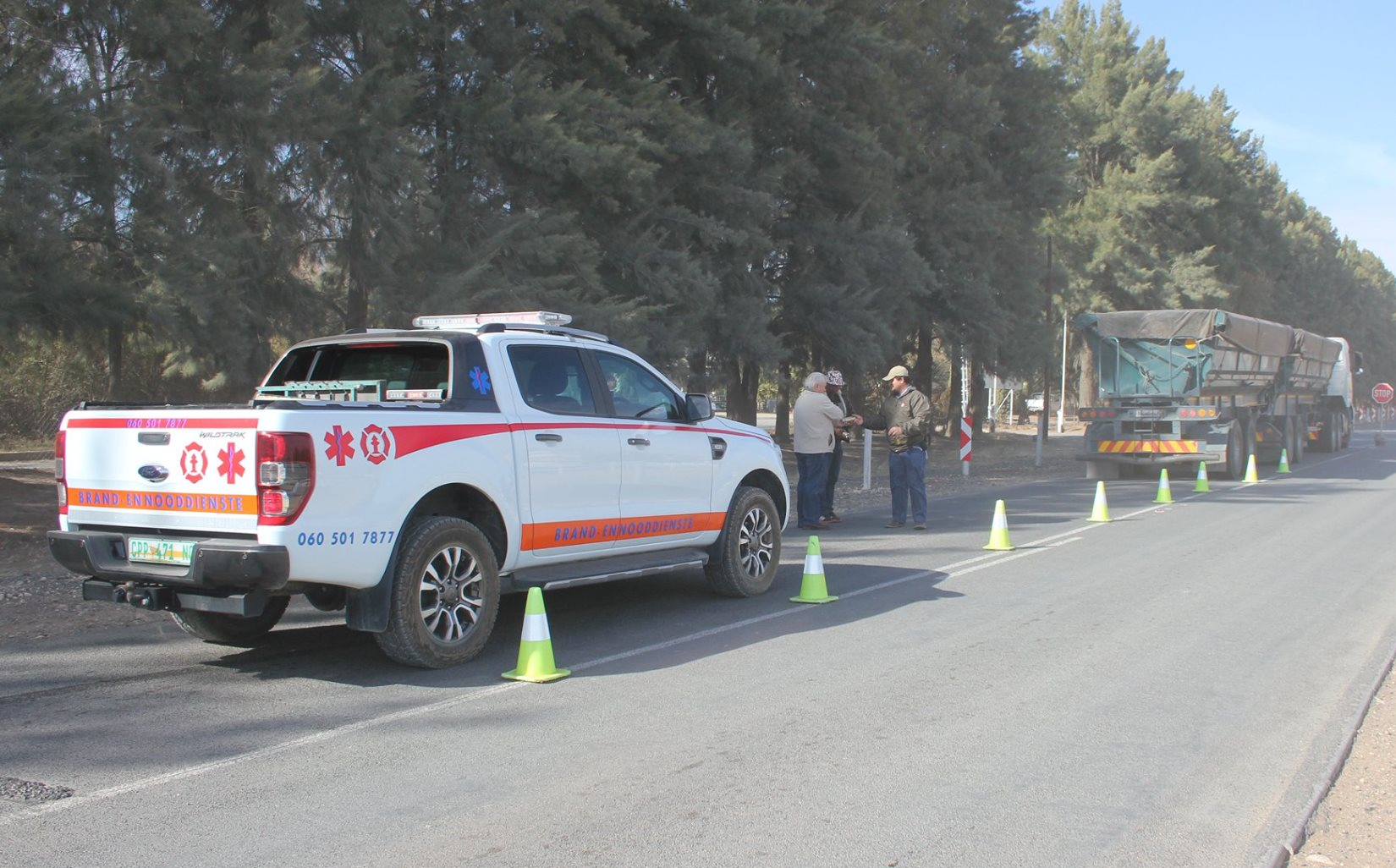
Orania Veiligheidsdienste securing a truck breakdown site

Orania has neither an official police force nor a prison. Although crime is not non-existent, it is very low, helped by having a small population whose residency applications are strictly examined. Traffic monitoring and minor crimes such as petty theft are handled internally. Volunteers carry out neighbourhood watch patrols. In October 2014 Orania Veiligheid (Orania Security) was established as the town's de facto municipal police, to handle reports of illegal activities such as theft, but also more trivial matters such as littering and noise complaints. Apprehended suspects are taken to the South African Police Service station in neighbouring Hopetown. National police are called in only as a last resort. Residents are exhorted to use mediation and arbitration procedures made available by the town council, rather than resorting to South African courts.

In 2017, local media reported on child abuse committed by an elderly Orania resident.

In 2019, the SAPS's Child Protection Unit visited the Volkskool Orania school to investigate a case of statutory rape against a student teacher. The student teacher was charged before the Hopetown Magistrate's Court.

In 2025, the town suffered its first murder when a resident killed his estranged wife and then himself.

=== External relations ===
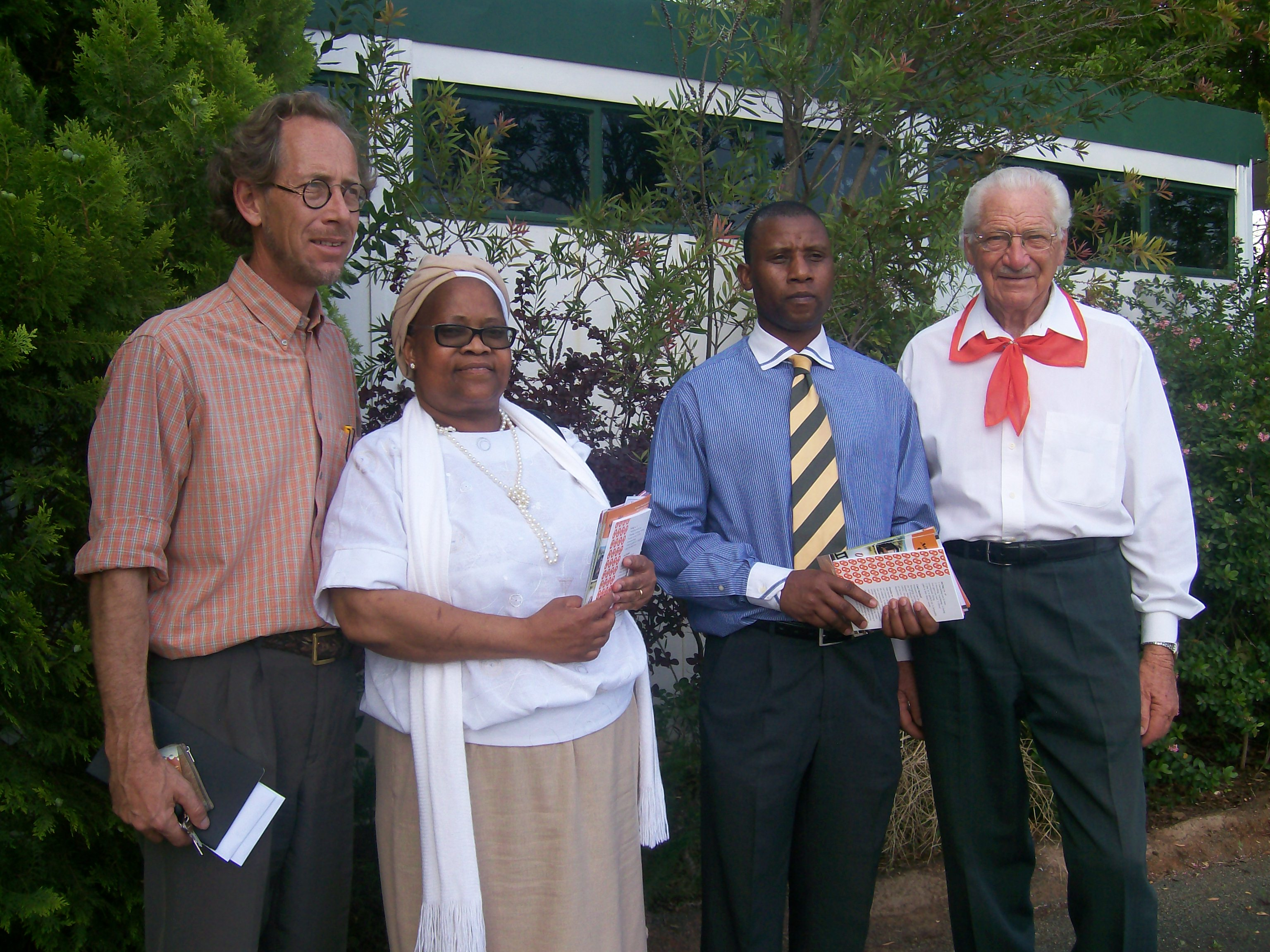
Representatives of the CRL Rights Commission visiting Orania in 2009

Over the years, Orania has been visited by many public figures, including Northern Cape Premier Dipuo Peters (in 2004), Julius Malema (in 2009), Desmond Tutu (in 2010), and former President Jacob Zuma (in 2010).

In June 2007, the Cape Coloured community of Eersterust, outside Pretoria visited the Afrikaner enclave. The groups met to discuss community development and discussed methods of self-governance. On 4 July 2007 the town of Orania and the Northern Cape government agreed that all government levels should discuss the question of Orania's self-government.

Orania and the Xhosa community of Mnyameni signed a cooperation agreement in December 2012, to assist in the development of own institutions and the transfer of knowledge between the communities.

Members of the Orania Beweging, including its president Carel Boshoff, went on a European tour in 2013, meeting with MPs from the Partij voor de Vrijheid of the Netherlands, the Vlaams Belang party in Belgium and Südtiroler Volkspartei in Italy's South Tyrol province. In 2022, representatives of Orania visited politicians and two Parliaments in Europe (The Netherlands and Belgium) to make the case that Afrikaners are a victimised minority in South Africa.

Boshoff rejected an invitation to the funeral of Afrikaner Weerstandsbeweging (AWB) leader Eugene Terre'Blanche in April 2010, as he saw him as having chosen a path of confrontation and conflict. Boshoff IV also noted that the Orania concept was at odds with the baasskap system of the apartheid period.

In August 2018, the Orania movement met with the previous president, Thabo Mbeki, as part of their public relations efforts.

In July 2022, two tribal leaders visited Orania on diplomatic missions. Representatives from the AmaBhele kaJamangile of the Xhosa people and king Seleka Barolong of the Tswana people met with Orania's leadership. The purpose of the visits was ‘to learn more about self-determination’.

=== Elections ===
Since 1994, citizens of Orania have voted in the six national elections. Over the last three elections, Orania had an average vote turnout of 65%, based on registered voters. In the South African general elections in 2004, 2009, and 2014, the community voted decisively for the right-wing Freedom Front Plus (FFP) party. The four votes recorded for the left-wing Economic Freedom Fighters party, who some have accused of anti-white racism, in the 2014 election elicited a number of comments from South African media.

In the 2019 general elections, the EFF took its members from surrounding areas to the voting station in Orania. In the 2021 municipal elections the FF Plus garnered some 88% of the votes, the DA almost 11% and the ACDP over 1%.

Summary of 2024 South African general election in Orania.
Party	Votes	%	+/−
VF+	376	65.62	▼13.78
DA	127	22.16	▲11.15
Hope4SA	38	6.63	New
ACDP	17	2.96	▲1.72
United Independent Movement	4	0.70	New
RP	3	0.52	New
The Organic Humanity Movement	2	0.35	New
PA	2	0.35	▲0.35
Democratic Liberal Congress	1	0.17	▲0.17
EFF	1	0.17	▼3.36
FREE DEMS	1	0.17	▲0.17
ActionSA	1	0.17	New
Total 573			
Source: MSN

Party	Votes (2004)	% (2004)	Votes (2009)	% (2009)	Votes (2014)	% (2014)	Votes (2019)	% (2019)
Freedom Front Plus	158	84.95%	242	▲86.73%	224	▼76.89%	447	▲79.40%
Democratic Alliance	16	8.60%	26	▲9.31%	44	▲15.12%	62	▼11.01%
African Christian Democratic Party	3	1.61%	3	▼1.07%	7	▲2.41%	7	▼1.24%
African National Congress	3	1.61%	3	▼1.07%	5	▲1.72%	3	▼0.53%
Congress of the People (Note: Party did not contest in elections before 2009.)	-	-	3	1.07%	1	▼0.34%	8	▲1.41%
National Action (Note: Party only contest in the 2004 elections and then submerged into the Freedom Front, making it the Freedom Front Plus)	3	1.61%	-	-	-	-	-	-
Independent Democrats (Note: Merged into the Democratic Alliance in 2012.)	2	1.08%	0	0%	-	-	-	-
New National Party (Note: Merged into the African National Congress in 2005.)	1	0.54%	-	-	-	-	-	-
Economic Freedom Fighters (Note: Party did not contest in elections before 2014.)	-	-	-	-	4	1.37%	21 (Note: On the election day, a group of non-resident EFF party members from Hopewell, Northern Cape cast their ballots in Orania as a political act.)	▲3.73
Front National	-	-	-	-	4	1.37%	12	2.13%
Ubuntu Party	-	-	-	-	2	0.69%	-	-
African Covenant	-	-	-	-	-	-	2	0.36%
United Democratic Movement	-	-	-	-	-	-	1	0.18%
Spoilt votes	2	1.08%	2	0.71%	0	0.00%		
Total	188	100.00%	279	100.00%	291	100%	550	100%

=== Media ===
The Independent Communications Authority of South Africa (ICASA) shut down the first local community radio, Radio Club 100, in November 2005 for broadcasting without a licence and being a "racist-based station". The station's management contended they had repeatedly applied for a licence and were merely carrying out tests, and that they broadcast news about birthdays and social events. ICASA granted a licence to the new Radio Orania in December 2007, and the station began broadcasting on 13 April 2008 on 95.5 MHz. The community station is run by volunteers and counts over 50 contributors. Programmes include readings of Afrikaans literature such as Mikro's Die ruiter in die nag.

Dorpnuus, the town hall's newsletter, was launched in November 2005 and reports on local events and meetings of the town council. Volkstater is an independent local publication that is sent to supporters of the Volkstaat idea, mostly non-residents of Orania, and deals with local events and Afrikaner history. Voorgrond, a publication of the Orania Beweging, is aimed primarily at non-residents who support the movement.

== Geography ==
South Africa map of Köppen climate classification

The climate of the area around the town is that of a dry-winter desert (Köppen BWhw or BWkw, depending on how these designations are defined). Orania is part of the Nama Karoo biome, and receives 191 millimetres (7.5 in) of rain a year. More than 30,000 trees have been planted in Orania and the surrounding farmlands.

The tree vegetation of Orania includes common karee (karee), white karee (witkaree), buffalo-thorn (blinkblaar-wag-’n-bietjie), shepherd's tree (witgat) and common acacia (soetdoring).

=== Climate ===
Climate data for Orania, South Africa
Month	Jan	Feb	Mar	Apr	May	Jun	Jul	Aug	Sep	Oct	Nov	Dec	Year
Mean daily maximum °C (°F)	30.4 (86.7)	29.1 (84.4)	27.8 (82.0)	22.7 (72.9)	19.9 (67.8)	15.4 (59.7)	15.6 (60.1)	18.8 (65.8)	23.4 (74.1)	26.1 (79.0)	28.2 (82.8)	30 (86)	21.4 (70.5)
Mean daily minimum °C (°F)	19.5 (67.1)	18.6 (65.5)	16.8 (62.2)	12.3 (54.1)	9.6 (49.3)	5.4 (41.7)	5.0 (41.0)	6.5 (43.7)	10.1 (50.2)	13.6 (56.5)	15.4 (59.7)	18.1 (64.6)	11 (52)
Average rainfall mm (inches)	32 (1.3)	41 (1.6)	24 (0.9)	20 (0.8)	6 (0.2)	9 (0.4)	5 (0.2)	3 (0.1)	3 (0.1)	11 (0.4)	12 (0.5)	25 (1.0)	191 (7.5)

== Works about Orania ==
The unusual and controversial nature of Orania has drawn the interest of researchers, especially in the field of anthropology. Kotze (2003) examines Orania as a case of a non-declining small town in South Africa. Steyn (2004) elaborates on the town's bottom-up approach to development. De Beer (2006) considers the achievements of Orania, deeming it unlikely that it will ever succeed in bringing about self-determination. Terisa Pienaar analyzed the Volkstaat concept, and the suitability of Orania as a growth point for a Volkstaat. Lindi Todd included Orania in a study on how the Afrikaner identity developed after the end of apartheid. Liesel Blomerus focused on the identity of Afrikaner women in the town. Lise Hagen addressed the concepts of space and place in Orania. South African economist Dawie Roodt described the town as being "like a Petri dish" for economic research.

In September 2012, a German documentary film titled Orania premiered at London's Raindance Film Festival. The film is a sociological study of the town. The town was also featured in a 2009 documentary produced by France Ô, Orania, citadelle blanche en Afrique and in 2018, the town featured in "Farmlands" a documentary about farm murders in South Africa, produced by Lauren Southern.

On 17 May 2023, Channel 4 commissioned a documentary in which British television presenter Ade Adepitan travels to Orania to understand the mindset of its people. The film was entitled Whites Only: Ade's Extremist Adventure, and it premiered on 18 March 2024. In the documentary, Adepitan concluded that it's "too simplistic to brand everyone in Orania a racist", but that they are prejudiced. He thought that many in Orania are traumatised by the end of apartheid, and that they want to recreate their past. But Adepitan sees this as a form of extreme racial separatism, and says he doesn't want to live in a world where people are "segregated into ethnically cleansed states".

== See also ==
- Afrikaner nationalism
- Eureka City
- Gated community
- Homeland
- Intentional community
- Kleinfontein
- Carel Boshoff
- Carel Boshoff IV
- Volkstaat
- Cape Republic
- White flight
- Boer republics
