= Majuba Day =

South African observance

- Date: 27 February
- Next time: 27 February 2027
- Frequency: annual

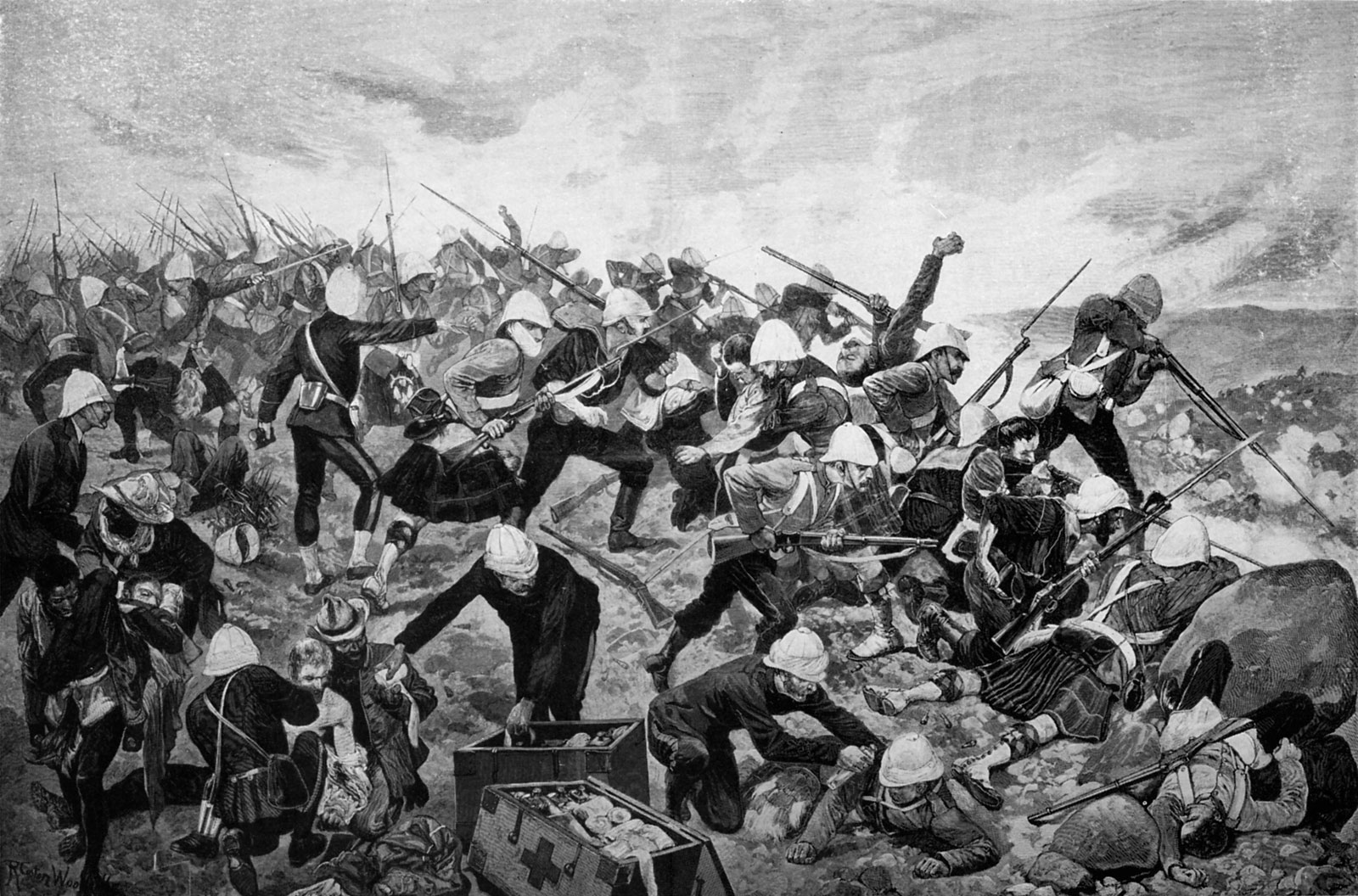
The Battle of Majuba, drawn by Richard Caton Woodville for the Illustrated London News

Majuba Day (Afrikaans: Majubadag) was a major annual national celebration on 27 February in the South African Republic in the period between the First and Second Boer Wars. The day was named after the Battle of Majuba Hill (near Volksrust, South Africa) where on 27 February 1881 the main battle of the First Boer War took place.

During the Second Boer War, the surrender of Piet Cronjé to the British after the equally resounding Battle of Paardeberg took place on 27 February 1900, leading Paul Kruger to declare, "The English have taken our Majuba Day away from us".

After the Second Boer War, with the Transvaal Colony (1902–1910) under British rule, Majuba Day was replaced by Victoria Day (24 May).

The day is still, however, celebrated by some Afrikaners; such as those in the town of Orania.
