= Founders Day (South Africa) =

Former public holiday in South Africa

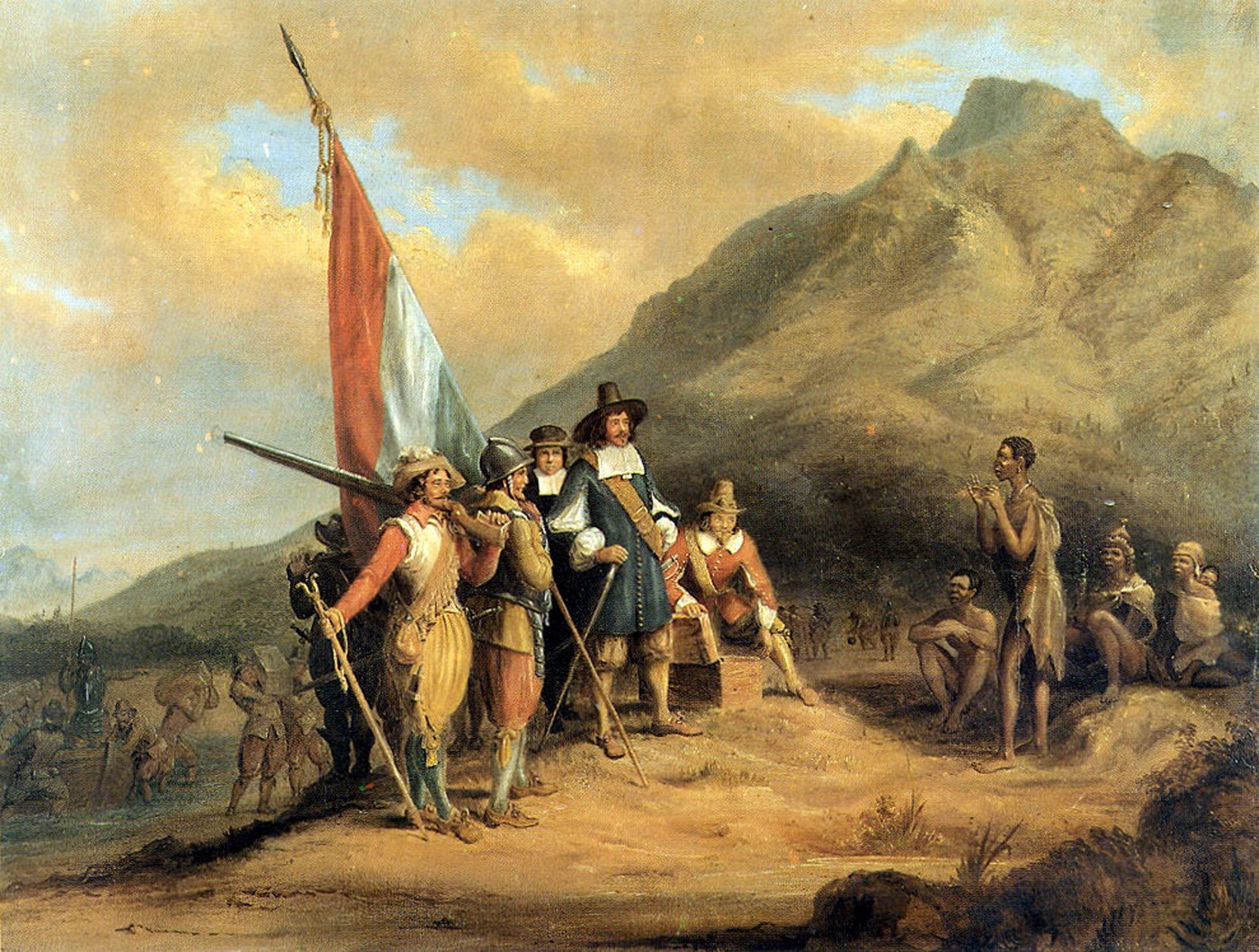
Jan van Riebeeck arrives at Table Bay on 6 April 1652.

Founders Day (Afrikaans: Stigtingsdag) or Jan Van Riebeeck's Day was a formal public holiday of the Union of South Africa and the Republic of South Africa until 1994.

== Background ==
The holiday was established on 6 April 1952 during the Van Riebeeck Festival in honour of the 300th anniversary of the arrival of the Dutch in South Africa. Jan van Riebeeck arrived at Table Bay on 6 April 1652 as a result Cape Town was founded. From 1980, the day became known as Founders Day (Stigtingsdag).

The holiday was abolished after the first universal franchise election in 1994 and the subsequent new constitution.

Founders Day continues to be celebrated in the Afrikaner enclave Orania.
