= Marais (surname) =

The surname Marais (Marsh in French) may refer to:

"Marais" from France:

- Jean Marais (1913–1998), a French actor
- Marin Marais (1656–1728), a French Baroque music composer
- Matthieu Marais (1664–1737), a French jurist and writer
- Paul Godet des Marais (1647–1709), a French Bishop of Chartres
- Roland Marais (c. 1685 – c. 1750), a French Baroque composer

"Marais" from the UK:

- Richard Marais, an oncologist

"Marais" from the United States:

- Anthony Marais (born 1966), an American writer

"Marais" from South Africa:

- Ben Marais (1909–1999), theologian and ecumenist
- Eloise Marais, South African atmospheric scientist
- Erik Marais (living), a South African politician
- Eugène Marais (1871–1936), a South African lawyer, naturalist, poet and writer
- Hannes Marais (born 1941), a South African international rugby union player and captain
- Jaap Marais (1923–2000), an Afrikaner nationalist and the leader of the far-right South African political party, the Herstigte Nasionale Party
- Jan S. Marais (1919–2009), South African banker and politician
- Jean Marais (born 1992), South African cricketer
- Jessica Marais (born 1985), a South African-born Australian actress
- Josef Marais (1905–1978), a South African singer
- Kobus Marais (living), a South African politician
- Lejeanne Marais (born 1989), a South African figure skater
- Nic Marais (born 1980), a South African radio personality
- Peter Marais (born 1948), a South African politician
- SP Marais (born 1989), a South African rugby union player
- Stephanus Le Roux Marais (1896–1979), a South African composer
- Wessel Marais (1929–2013), a South African botanist
- Willie Marais (1928–2007), an Afrikaner nationalist and the leader of the Herstigte Nasionale Party

== See also ==
- Marais (disambiguation)
- Sarie Marais
