= AfriForum =

South African non-governmental organization

- Formation: 26 March 2006
- Type: NGO
- Headquarters: Union Street, Kloofsig, Gauteng
- Members: 300,000 (2026)
- CEO: Kallie Kriel
- Head: Organisation Building: William Waugh
- Head: Operational Affairs: Frik Dreyer
- Affiliations: Solidarity (South African trade union)
- Website: afriforum.co.za

Afriforum is a South African organisation which focuses on the interests of Afrikaners, a subgroup of the country's white population. Afriforum was established by the trade union Solidarity in 2006 and is officially registered as a non-governmental organisation. The organisation frequently advocates for and against a range of issues in South Africa.

Afriforum's detractors have variously described it as an alt-right, Afrikaner nationalist, and/or white supremacist organisation. Afriforum describes itself as a "pro-minority," as opposed to a "pro-white," organisation and its membership as having what are regarded as typically politically centrist views.

== History ==
AfriForum was founded in 2006 following public consultations about its charter. AfriForum refers to itself as a citizen's rights initiative founded by the trade union Solidarity.

By 2026, AfriForum had 300,000 contributing members.

Its leader, Kallie Kriel, was previously a member of the Conservative Party, as well as a leader of the Freedom Front Plus (FF+) youth wing, and a large number of its executive leadership were formerly associated with Freedom Front Plus.

== Campaigns, policies and projects ==
Afriforum often acts as a lobbying group. Issues it has lobbied on range from resisting the name change of Pretoria to Tshwane to advocating for a free-market economy within South Africa whilst opposing policies it sees as socialist.

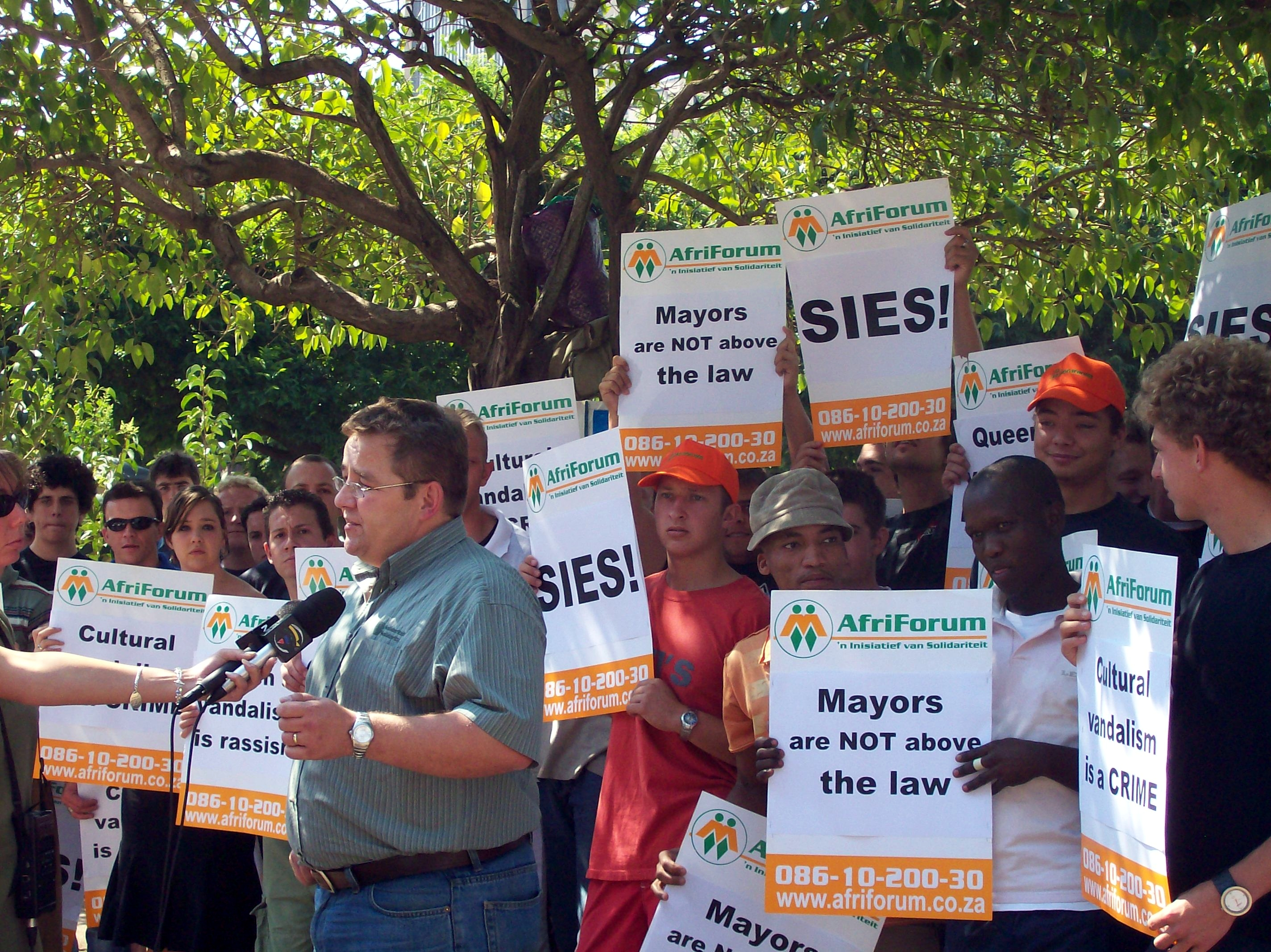
Members and supporters of AfriForum, led by Kallie Kriel, protest outside the Pretoria High Court in 2008.

=== Education, language and culture ===
AfriForum has strongly opposed the proposed renaming of South Africa's capital from Pretoria to Tshwane, as well as street renaming in Pretoria. The organisation campaigns to promote the use of Afrikaans in education and to keep religion in schools.

=== Land ===
AfriForum is involved in the South African land reform debate. They have blamed the "corruption" and "incompetence" of the Department of Rural Development and Land Reform for the slow pace of land reform.

AfriForum has assisted black landowners who were victims of squatters.

The organisation appeared before a parliamentary committee to oppose proposed constitutional amendments to allow for expropriation without compensation. In August 2018, AfriForum published a list of farms that they claimed were targeted by the government for expropriation without compensation, which the organisation claimed to have received from an anonymous source. Several organisations and political parties criticised the legitimacy of the list. The South African Institute for Race Relations claimed that the list was legitimate.

AfriForum successfully complained about a column published on News24 by journalist Pieter du Toit regarding its testimony before the parliamentary committee discussing amending the constitution to allow for expropriation without compensation.

=== Racism and hate speech campaigns ===
Julius Malema, then President of the ANCYL, at the University of Johannesburg in 2010 sang the song "Dubul' ibhunu" in the context of post-1994 South Africa's slow resolution to the problem unequal distribution of land ownership along racial lines. Four weeks after Malema's 2010 singing of the song, Eugène Terre'Blanche; a farmer, white supremacist, convicted criminal and founder of the Afrikaner nationalist and neo-Nazi paramilitary group, Afrikaner Weerstandsbeweging; was murdered on his farm by a black employee. Following these event, AfriForum opened a civil case against Malema alleging that his use of the song was a provocation to racial violence and hate speech.

It was initially ruled that the song constituted hate speech, but after several rounds of appeals, the highest court in South Africa - the constitutional court - ultimately on 27 March 2025 refused AfriForum leave to appeal, holding that the application "bears no reasonable prospects of success".

AfriForum has laid criminal charges against other political figures, and social media users that it deemed to be inciting violence and racism, In June 2011, AfriForum said that they plan to lay criminal charges against 100 social media users for incitement of violence. and created a unit against racism and hate speech. It also addressed racist incidents involving a number of people, Dan Roodt, and the paramilitary Kommandokorps and has stated that it regards the use of the 'k-word' kaffir to be a "gross human rights violation".

In 2020, AfriForum opened a hate speech case against the Economic Freedom Fighters (EFF) party for six instances between 2016 and 2019 for singing "shoot the boer" at different events. In late August the Johannesburg High Court dismissed the case with costs. Ernst Roets testified as an expert witness with the judge saying that he failed to meet the standards required. AfriForum has stated that it will appeal.

=== Minority rights ===
AfriForum has engaged with the UN on matters pertaining to minorities' rights and has been officially recognized as a non-governmental organization (NGO) with special advisory status. The group has criticized the governing African National Congress (ANC) for what it sees as a denial of minority rights in the nation. However, former City Press journalist Adriaan Basson has accused the organisation of overreacting to the situation regarding minority rights. Basson stated in an open letter to AfriForum CEO, Kallie Kriel, that the premise of AfriForum's campaigns is one of victimhood.

=== International lobbying ===
Afriforum claimed credit for taking an Australian journalist on a tour of South Africa, and for the "dozens" of articles detailing violent attacks on farms that subsequently appeared in the Australian media.

AfriForum also undertook a tour of the United States that included meetings with John R. Bolton, staffers for Senator Ted Cruz, and an interview on Fox News. AfriForum toured Australia in October 2018 to raise awareness of farm attacks. Ian Cameron from AfriForum was interviewed on Sky News Australia's program Outsiders by Ross Cameron and Rowan Dean. AfriForum also delivered a presentation before the Parliament of Western Australia.

==== Zimbabwe ====
The group contested the presence of Robert Mugabe at the 2009 inauguration of Jacob Zuma. It was also involved in a bid to prevent the delivery of Alouette III Air Force helicopters to the Zimbabwean army.

In 2010 a legal team for AfriForum representing farmers in Zimbabwe won a court bid to sue Zimbabwe's government over its "cruel" and "vengeful" expropriation of South African-owned farms. In 2008 the regional court SADC tribunal ruled that Zimbabwe's land reform was illegal and racist, and that those who had suffered discrimination by having their farms expropriated had the right to compensation.

=== Local government ===
AfriForum encourages communities to become self-sufficient. Activities undertaken have included a pothole fixing campaign. According to the organization, such initiatives are part of its strategy to hold government responsible for service delivery, and are sometimes supported by local municipalities.

In order to achieve this goal, AfriForum attempts to establish partnerships with municipalities. The organisation allegedly submits wish lists to municipalities, and municipalities convert it into action plans to address issues. AfriForum says if municipalities do not cooperate in improving service delivery to residents, the organisation approaches courts to order municipalities to enforce service delivery.

An example of intervention by AfriForum in this regard was the urgent order awarded to the organisation against the Vhembe District Municipality by the High Court in Pretoria, forcing the municipality to supply water to Makhado residents. In a similar case in 2013, the North Gauteng High Court in Pretoria granted AfriForum an order stopping the Madibeng Municipality from cutting electricity supply to Hartbeespoort.

In June 2025, in a case brought forward by Afriforum, the Free State High Court ordered the dissolution of the Ngwathe Local Municipality due to longstanding failures to fulfil its duties to residents, compelling the Free State provincial government to step in.

AfriForum's local government interventions have been described positively, even by its critics.

=== Other campaigns and positions ===
AfriForum has opposed fracking in the Karoo as well as poaching. It has also campaigned against electronic road tolling in Gauteng.

AfriForum was accepted as amicus curiae (friend of the court) during a number of court cases. Cases where AfriForum acted as amicus curiae, included those allowing voters overseas to vote in South African elections, protecting mineral rights from expropriation, and allowing public schools to promote adherence to only one or predominantly one religion during their religious school activities. AfriForum also acted as amicus curiae (later co-applicant) in a 2017 case against the Minister of Sports and Recreation, and the Olympic Committee, opposing racial quotas in sport after it was discovered that the racial quotas were being applied in the national netball team selection process.

== AfriForum Jeug (youth wing) ==
AfriForum's youth wing is called AfriForum Jeug. It operates as a student organisation with branches at South African universities.

AfriForum Jeug focuses on education issues, including mother tongue education, political interference in student affairs, and affirmative action at universities. A core objective of AfriForum Jeug is for youth to be exempted from affirmative action. The group's non-university activities include organising adventure camps for school learners and fundraising for children's homes. The youth wing claims that one of their biggest aims is to promote "the Christian democratic framework". AfriForum Jeug claims that they focus more on "Afrikaans" interests instead of "Afrikaner" interests.

In 2010, three AfriForum Jeug members were arrested after violating an outdoor advertising by-law to protest the proposed name change of Pretoria.

In 2012, a campaign against racial quotas in higher education saw AfriForum Jeug members paint themselves black to protest the alleged discrimination against 30 learners who were turned away from the University of Pretoria.

In February 2012, AfriForum Jeug joined the South African Progressive Civic Organisation (Sapco), a Khoisan community, in a protest over the land rights of the indigenous group, with both minority groups feeling they have no representation in the current government.

In February 2013 AfriForum Jeug brought a complaint of hate speech against Jason Mfusi, leader of South African Students Congress), who on social media had posted, "My grandfather says 'n goeie boer is 'n dooie boer" ("a good farmer is a dead farmer"). An agreement by means of a mediation process, as requested by the Human Rights Commission (HRC) of the university, and Mfusi had to issue a written apology to the farming community.

In April 2013, a campaign protesting against racial quotas involved charging students of different races different prices for a cup of coffee, with white students paying R5 a cup, coloured and Indians R3, and blacks R1.

In 2014 AfriForum Jeug demanded that the North-West University reject a report into a Nazi-style initiation ceremony at the university's Potchefstroom campus, claiming that the report discriminated against Afrikaners. The report was originally commissioned by Minister of Higher Education and Training Blade Nzimande as an investigation into "the initiation practices and acts of Fascism and Nazism which seem to exist at the institution".

== Criticism and controversies ==
The organisation has been described as minimising the historical severity of apartheid. In a 2018 interview, the group's CEO, Kallie Kriel, asserted that he did not believe apartheid constituted a crime against humanity, a view that drew significant criticism. A common activity of the organisation involves publicizing claims regarding farm attacks, which it alleges disproportionately target white South African farmers. These claims, which official crime statistics and research institutions have repeatedly contested as unsubstantiated, form a key pillar of the white genocide conspiracy theory. In 2024, the organisation faced criticism over the use of orange, white and blue at a protest against the Basic Education Laws Amendment Act attended by participants from several organisations and political parties, including the Democratic Alliance. Critics argued that this resembled the colours of the former South African flag.

=== White genocide conspiracy theory ===
AfriForum is often accused of advancing the white genocide conspiracy theory due to the group's disproved claims that white South Africans are being specifically targeted in farm attacks. The organization has denied this and lodged a successful complaint with the Press Council of South Africa against an article from Mail & Guardian that claimed it promotes the idea of a white genocide. Breakfast Show host Bongani Bingwa also apologized after claiming AfriForum had specifically used the phrase "white genocide", saying "Ernst Roets, I owe you an apology, AfriForum has not used the word white genocide."

In June 2012, the African National Congress Youth League stated that AfriForum is "the defender of white privilege", after AfriForum lodged charges of hate speech with the police and the Equality Court against ANCYL deputy president, Ronald Lamola for statements relating to land held by white farmers.

In 2023, the youth wing of AfriForum put up posters of "No Whites Allowed" across University of Pretoria's campus as a protest. The university responded to the incident with: "We will take immediate disciplinary action against those responsible for defacing the university's property, and advocating for racism in an institution of higher learning dedicated to the education and transformation of South Africa".

On 7 February 2025, U.S. President Donald Trump signed an executive order cutting off financial aid to South Africa, citing concerns over land expropriation policies and South Africa's genocide case against Israel at the International Court of Justice. On 10 February 2025, the uMkhonto weSizwe party filed treason charges against AfriForum, saying that AfriForum influenced Trump's decision by allegedly lobbying for the sanctions, and alleging they undermined national sovereignty through misinformation. AfriForum denied the allegations. Legal experts suggest the treason case may be difficult to prove, as intent to undermine sovereignty must be established. Trump also offered refugee status to white South African farmers, citing persecution concerns, but AfriForum declined, asserting their commitment to remain in the country.

The survivalist group Kommandokorps criticised AfriForum in February 2012, saying that AfriForum "had not done much to prevent farm murders". This was in response to AfriForum's criticism of Kommandokorps in which AfriForum CEO Kallie Kriel said that Kommandokorps' treatment of young people at training camps is "immoral and inexcusable".

=== Threats and actions of violence ===
In May 2018, following criticism of AfriForum by a North-West University professor, Elmien du Plessis, Afriforum's former deputy CEO, Ernst Roets, posted a YouTube video where he quoted Victor Klemperer, stating that "if the tables were turned after the Holocaust he "would have all the intellectuals strung up, and the professors three feet higher than the rest; they would be left hanging from the lamp posts for as long as was compatible with hygiene." Following the video posting, du Plessis and her family received threats of violence. A petition condemning the threats against academics was subsequently circulated.

In July 2016, Afriforum applied to the Western Cape High Court to have posts on social media removed that stated that AfriForum supporters had "threaten to rape women" and had "used rape to intimidate a rape survivor", on the grounds that such claims are defamatory and that the claims were false. However, the judge ruled that AfriForum protestors did in fact "commit assault, sexual violence, sexual aggression and intimidation" against the anti-rape culture protesters. The judge noted that while some of the statements about rape threats were not literally true, the social media poster is "entitled to a certain amount of latitude in describing the confrontation" due to strong emotions elicited by the issue.

=== Views on Apartheid ===
The organization attracted significant controversy in May 2018, when AfriForum CEO Kallie Kriel was asked near the end of a radio interview whether he believed Apartheid was a crime against humanity, to which he replied by saying "I don't think that apartheid was a crime against humanity, but I think it was wrong." Similar remarks concerning apartheid's classification as a crime against humanity were made in 2020 by former South African president F. W. de Klerk, who said that he did not fully agree with the classification and distinguished apartheid from genocide. De Klerk subsequently withdrew the statement and apologised The organisation had also previously described Apartheid as a "so-called historical injustice" and its deputy leader Ernst Roets has described Apartheid as a "wooly concept".

In 2016, AfriForum supporters protested because Steve Hofmeyr's scheduled event at Café Dudok, a restaurant in the Netherlands, was cancelled when the organisers were informed of his alleged white supremacist beliefs by a left-wing group in Netherlands.

In March 2019, AfriForum released a documentary called Disrupted Land, about land reform and expropriation in South Africa. In one clip, an interviewee defends HF Verwoerd's policies. This led the Institute of Race Relations to accuse Afriforum of "sanitising the motives behind apartheid and the brutality of its practices" and of "soft-soaping the evils of apartheid".

=== Allegations of racism ===
In February 2014, Flip Buys from the trade union Solidarity (which is associated with AfriForum) called for a boycott of the Afrikaans newspaper Beeld that reported that a group of Potchefstroom students gave the Nazi salute during their initiation.

In June 2015, AfriForum Youth said that allegations of racism against Curro Foundation School are themselves racist. In a statement by the organisation's chair it was said "To portray an Afrikaans class being transported as class group falsely as racial segregation, is beyond absurd".

Towards the end of 2014, the Commission for the Promotion and Protection of the Rights of Cultural, Religious and Linguistic Communities, criticised AfriForum's "Save Afrikaans schools" campaign in a press release. The campaign followed Gauteng Department of Basic Education's decision to force three Afrikaans-medium schools in Fochville to relinquish their status as Afrikaans-medium schools at the start of the 2012 school year.

In a radio interview in May 2018, vice chancellor of the University of the Witwatersrand Adam Habib criticised AfriForum for "linking up with fascists" such as the French National Front, the Italian Five Star Movement, Germany's AfD and US president Donald Trump's national security adviser John Bolton, whom Habib referred to during the same interview as "a known fascist", during Kriel and Roets' 2018 world tour.

=== Use of apartheid era flag ===
In May 2022, AfriForum sought to overturn the 2019 ban on the old South African flag display. The judgment was upheld in April 2023. The Nelson Mandela Foundation summed up the verdict: "gratuitous displays of the 'old Apartheid flag' do indeed constitute hate speech."

In November 2024, Afriforum hosted a protest against the Basic Education Laws Amendment Act 32 of 2024 (BELA Act), also commonly referred to as the BELA Act. The protest occurred at the Voortrekker Monument. Protestors wore clothing in blue, white and orange, colours associated with organisations present at the protest, including the Democratic Alliance, Solidarity Movement and AfriForum. Some commentators drew comparisons between the colours worn and the former South African flag. Cosatu called for the South African Human Rights Commission to investigate the event and its organisers. AfriForum CEO, Kallie Kriel stated that the colour coordination was simply coincidental. He stated: “The DA’s colour is blue and they came in their colour. People are stretching it with these conspiracy theories. This was a coincidence with the DA being there. If someone had come there with the apartheid flag, we would have asked them to leave.”

== Collaborations ==
In August 2026 AfriForum formed a partnership with March and March to fight corruption and to hold the government accountable. The collaboration will also focus on issues like grassroots community safety, legal issues, education, anti-crime initiatives and illegal immigration in South Africa.

== See also ==
- De Goede Hoop Hostel
