= South African Medical Association =

Professional association in South Africa

SAMA
- South African Medical Association
- Predecessor: Medical Association of South Africa; Progressive Doctors' Group
- Founded: 21 May 1998
- Headquarters: Pretoria, Gauteng
- Location: South Africa
- Members: 17,500
- Key people: Mvuyisi Mzukwa (chairperson); Kenneth David Boffard (president)
- Publication: South African Medical Journal; South African Medicine Formulary
- Website: samedical.org

The South African Medical Association (SAMA) is a non-statutory, professional association for public- and private-sector medical practitioners in South Africa. Registered as a nonprofit organization, it provides professional development services for medical professionals as well as engaging in public health advocacy.

Membership is voluntary, and the organization reports about 13,000 registered doctors. The head office is situated in Pretoria.

== History ==
On 21 May 1998, the association was established from a merger between the Medical Association of South Africa, founded in 1927, and the National Medical and Dental Forum.

In 1999, it became affiliated with the National Medical Alliance, along with the South African Medical and Dental Practitioners, Society of Dispensing Family Practitioners, Family Practitioners Association, Dispensing Family Practitioners Association, and the Eastern Cape Medical Guild.

In 2022, its chairwoman, Angelique Coetzee, stated in a radio interview that admission processes at medical schools are highly politicized and that medical faculties implement race quotas. After she apologized for her statements and resigned as chairwoman, Dirk Hermann of Solidarity reiterated that race-based admission processes were explicitly included in admission policies, and stated that these were detrimental to white students and health care.
