= Jaap Marais =

Afrikaner nationalist thinker, author, politician

Leader of the Herstigte Nasionale Party
- In office 1977 – 8 August 2000
- Preceded by: Albert Hertzog
- Succeeded by: Willie Marais
- Constituency: Innesdal; Pretoria

Member of Parliament of South Africa
- In office 1958–1969

Personal details
- Born: Jacob Albertus Marais; 2 November 1922 Vryburg, South Africa
- Died: 8 August 2000 (aged 77) Pretoria, South Africa
- Party: National Party until 1969, Herstigte Nasionale Party; 1969-2000
- Spouse: Maria Dorothea (Marie) (née Rautenbach)
- Children: Marjorié Louise Stoffberg; Karina Maria Slabbert; Jacob Albertus (Japie)
- Education: Hoër Handelskool Potchefstroom
- Profession: Politician

Jacob Albertus Marais (2 November 1922 – 8 August 2000) was an Afrikaner nationalist thinker, author, politician, Member of Parliament, and leader of the Herstigte Nasionale Party (HNP) from 1977 until his death in 2000.

== Early life and family history ==
Marais's father, Jaap Sr., and paternal grandfather, Sarel Jacobus Stefanus, were in active service on the Western front with the Bothaville commando during the Second Boer War. Both were made prisoners of war after Boer general Piet Cronjé's surrender at the Battle of Paardeberg. His father was sent to Broadbottom Camp at St. Helena, while his grandfather was held at Green Point and later paroled due to illness. He died a month after the end of the war. Marais's mother, together with her family, was interned at the Klerksdorp concentration camp. His paternal grandmother was the leader of a group of Boer women who travelled through the western Transvaal and western Free State for 18 months with their young children to avoid capture by British forces

Jaap Marais was one of nine children: six sons, and two daughters, of whom one brother died in infancy. Marais grew up on the Maraisdeel farm in the district of Vryburg. It originally formed part of a larger farm, Donkerpoort, which belonged to his grandfather. He attended a local school with his younger brother Jan. Marais matriculated in 1940 at Vryburg Hoërskool. With tensions rising between Afrikaner nationalism and British nationalism during the Second World War, Marais and a number of his classmates organized a "strike" on 10 October 1940, on account of it being the birthday of former president and bastion of Boer nationalism, Paul Kruger.

After school, Marais enrolled at the Hoër Handelskool in Potchefstroom, where he received a National Diploma in 1942.

Marais was a member of the Ossewabrandwag.

== Political life ==
=== Member of Parliament (1958-1969) ===
He was elected as a Member of Parliament for the ruling National Party in 1958 and served until 1969.

=== Herstigte Nasionale Party (1969-1982) ===
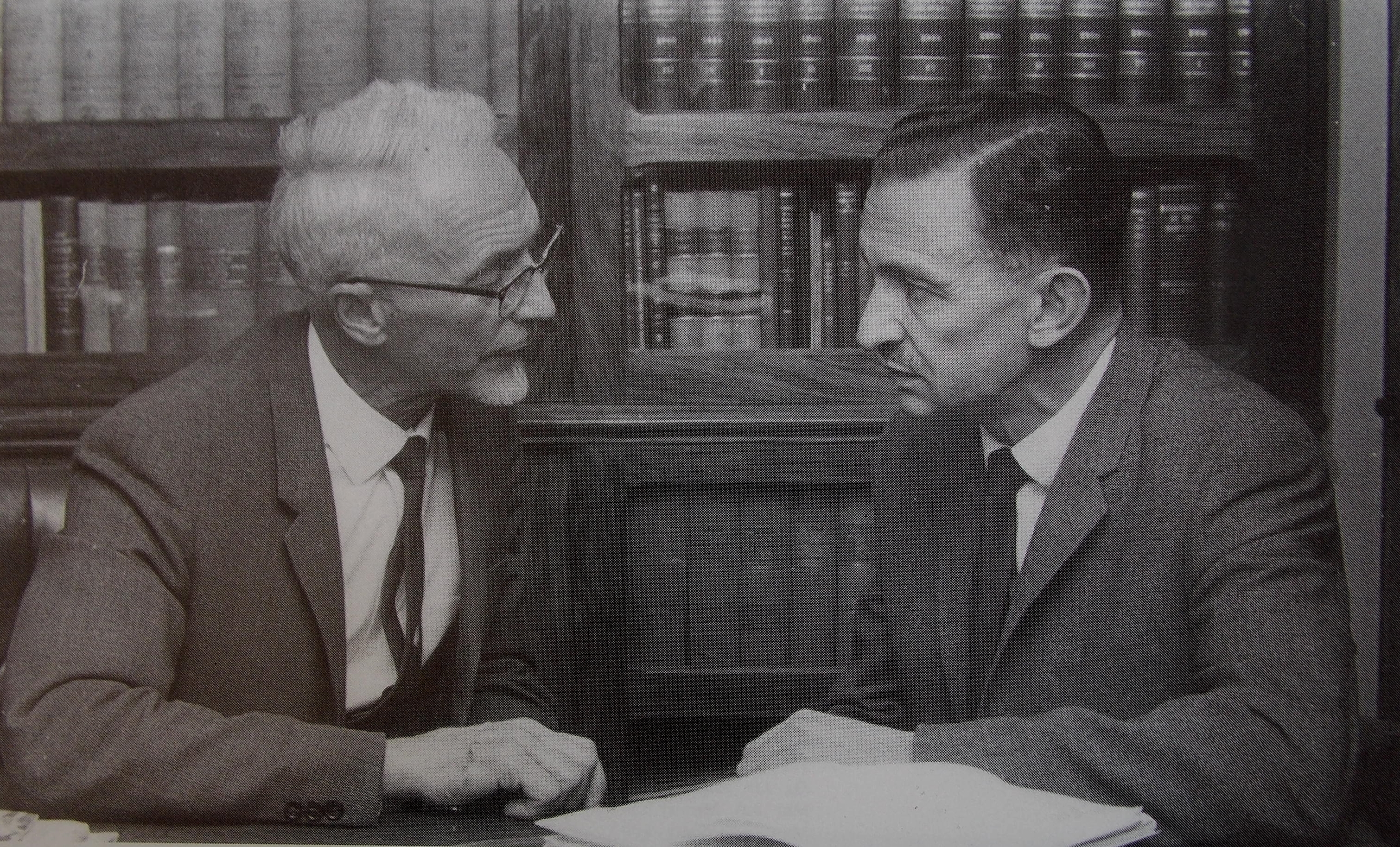
Albert Hertzog, leader of the HNP, and Marais in 1969

The Herstigte Nasionale Party (HNP) was formed in 1969 by Marais, Albert Hertzog (son of former Prime Minister General JBM Hertzog), a cabinet minister, and two other MPs (Louis Stofberg and Willie Marais). The founding of the party occurred three years after the assassination of Hendrik Verwoerd when BJ Vorster authorised the presence of Māori players and spectators during the tour of the New Zealand rugby union team in South Africa in 1970. Marais considered this measure as a concession under pressure that would result in liberalization and the dismantlement of apartheid. Jaap Marais was expelled from the Broederbond shortly after the formation of the HNP was formed, alongside other HNP members or sympathisers.

The HNP found it difficult to make headway against the entrenched and relatively conservative ruling National Party in the 1970s. It succeeded in winning 14% of the vote in the white parliamentary elections of 1981. However, it did not gain any seats due to the electoral system, which was based on a Westminster system of electoral districts rather than a proportional system. Its electoral growth played a role in encouraging the Conservative Party to split from the National Party in 1982 under Andries Treurnicht.

=== Fighting against reform and the dismantling of Apartheid (1982-1994) ===
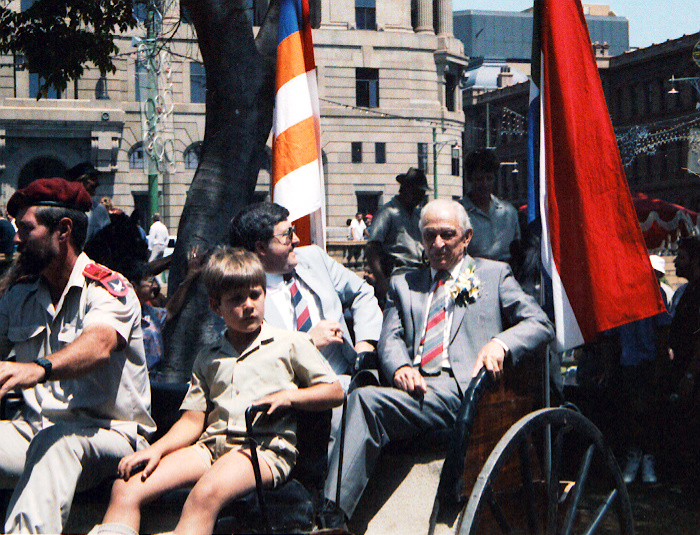
Jaap Marais arrives in a horse-drawn carriage at Church square, Pretoria in 1993. The two flags beside Marais are those of the former Boer republics of the Orange Free State (left) and Transvaal (right).

Under the leadership of Marais, the HNP challenged the policy of the National Party to negotiate with the African National Congress and the South African Communist Party. He proposed a Volksfront: a coalition of right-wing organisations with the objective of stopping President FW De Klerk from handing over the reins of government to the African National Congress. In 1992, a Volksfront was created from the ranks of the Conservative Party and led by Constand Viljoen after 1993.

In July 1993, in an open letter, Marais demanded a whites-only election from President De Klerk. In the same letter, Marais claimed that Afrikaners did not give De Klerk a mandate in the March 1992 referendum. Marais wrote to De Klerk that "hundreds of thousands of Afrikaners regarded De Klerk's actions as treason. Marais claimed that De Klerk would lose "every by-election in the run-up to a general election," in which De Klerk and the National Party "would be smashed". In September 1993 Marais repeated his request in another open letter. This time Marais accused De Klerk and his cronies of being "retarded (slow) communists", frequently conceding to the ANC/SACP alliance.

=== Resistance in the New South Africa (1994-2000) ===
After South Africa’s first non-racial democratic elections on 27 April 1994, Marais’s HNP maintained a policy of non-participation in the formal political and electoral system. Marais propagated the rhyming motto Kies Reg: Bly Weg!, which translates as "Decide/Vote Correct: Stay Away!"

Solidariteit's Flip Buys, then at the Mine Workers' Union, accused Marais of slander and defamation in an email addressed to Oom Jaap niksdoen ("Uncle Jaap Do-nothing"). He accused Marais of defamation against Bruwer, Hartzenberg and Viljoen, who Buys regarded as "men who sacrifice everything for their People". Buys further expressed his wish that Marais's "role in the dismantling of our People" be "laid bare in court". Marais replied: "Your letter is an interesting experience. I have never before dealt with a case where a writer's level of ignorance is exceeded so clearly by the degree of his rudeness."

Today, the party still does not recognise the right of the African National Congress government to rule over Afrikaners in South Africa. The party also has not relinquished its claim to the previously white-dominated part of South Africa. It continues to encourage its supporters not to vote, as part of its policy of resistance.

Jaap Marais claimed that it was the British and not the National Party of 1948 who had invented apartheid. Marais also demanded an apology from then UK Prime Minister Tony Blair for Britain's conduct during the Anglo Boer War of 1899–1902, in particular its use of concentration camps in which 27,000 Boer civilians perished (24,000 children and 3,000 women).

== Private life ==
Marais became engaged to Marie Rautenbach in 1957, and the two were married on 6 January 1959 in Patensie. They had two daughters, Marjorié and Karina, and a son, Japie.

Marais had an affinity for the work of Afrikaans poets N.P. van Wyk Louw and D.J. Opperman, as well as those of the Dutch and Flemish poets Marnix Gijsen, Henriette Roland Holst, Hendrik Marsman, and Martinus Nijhoff. His favourite English poetry was that of Roy Campbell, T. S. Eliot, and John Keats, the latter of whom he described as "evergreen". During the 1950s, Marais translated William Shakespeare's Julius Caesar into Afrikaans.

Marais was an avid breeder of budgerigars.

== Political views ==
Marais was an influential thinker in right-wing Afrikaner nationalist circles from the 1970s to the 1990s. His influences included Hans Strijdom and Hendrik Verwoerd. He wrote a political biography of Hendrik Verwoerd as well as many political articles and booklets. In his writings and speeches, Marais often referred to Richard Weaver, C.J. Langenhoven, Tobie Muller, James Burnham, Alexis de Tocqueville, Edmund Burke, G.K. Chesterton, Alain de Benoist, Oswald Spengler, Arnold J. Toynbee, Ludwig von Mises, F.A. von Hayek and Ortega y Gasset.

Marais considered identity, continuity, and freedom as the three key themes of Afrikaner nationalism. He emphasized that identity rested on each group's preference for its own. Such a group preference implied a related right among members of the group to differentiate and discriminate to exercise a group's preference. According to Marais, among each group of people there was a center of authority that determined who was included and excluded. In the case of Afrikaners, their centers of authority ensured that a racial preference for whites, the Afrikaans language, a distinctive Western culture, traditions and history had formed the Afrikaner identity in southern Africa.

According to Marais, continuity depended on each generation maintaining what had been built up by previous generations and transferring it to the next generation. He emphasized Afrikaners' freedom struggle against foreign domination by British imperialism in the Anglo Boer War, but also against American and Soviet forces during the Cold War as well as the various black ethnic peoples in South Africa. In his view, this freedom was linked to the fatherland of Afrikaners, which he defined as the areas of South Africa dominated by whites.

== Publications ==
=== Books ===
- Stryd is lewe, Pretoria: Aktuele Publikasies, 1980, ISBN 978-0-620046-87-9.
- Waarheid en werklikheid, Pretoria: Aktuele Publikasies, 1983.
- Afrikanernasionalisme en die Nuwe Suid-Afrika, Pretoria: Strydpers, 1990.
- Wie is die Afrikaners?, Pretoria: Aktuele Publikasies.
- The Founders of the New South Africa, Pretoria: Herstigte Nasionale Party, 1994.
- Die IDASA-komplot teen Afrikanernasionalisme, 1997.
- Afspraak met die toekoms: Die stem van Jaap Marais en Afrikanernasionalisme, Pretoria: Bienedell Uitgewers, 2001, ISBN 0-9584118-4-0.
- Stryd teen Vreemde Oorheersing, Pretoria: Bienedell Uitgewers, 2003, ISBN 0-9584118-6-7.
