= Witkruis Monument =

Monument to the victims of South African farm attacks

Coordinates: 24°04′53″S 29°12′15″E

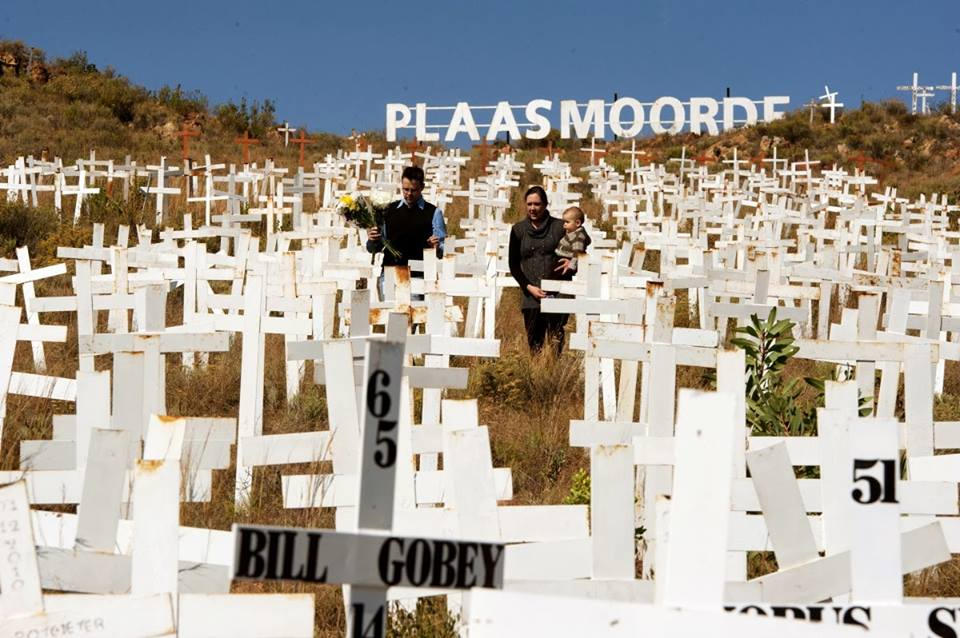
Relatives plant crosses for victims of farm attacks. Bill Gobey (cross shown) was shot in the face in 1987 and his spouse killed at Hekpoort when robbers tried to steal a safe from their rondavel.

The Witkruis Monument or Plaasmoorde Monument is a monument complex along the N1 route between Mokopane and Polokwane, South Africa, conspicuously located on the slope of Ysterberg, on private property of the Harmse family. Since June 16, 2004, symbolic white-painted metal crosses have been planted on the area of about 5 ha (12 acres) for each death during a South African farm attack. The attacks have targeted both white and black farmers. 925 of the approximately 3,000 white metal crosses on the slope are arranged in a striking central cross shape to emphasize the Christian nature of the monument. About 20 red crosses at the top of the monument represent local casualties. In 2020 and 2022, further monuments were placed at the foot of the cross field.

== History ==
In 2004, farmers erected white crosses along the N1 to raise awareness of farm murders. SANRAL and the road authority however objected to this so that the crosses had to be moved further up the ridge. 300 members of the community met on 16 June 2004 and the first crosses were planted on the farm of the then owner, Stephan van der Walt. Neels Roelofse, criminologist at the University of Limpopo, and his wife Rina, were the initial organizers. There were initially 1,200 identical crosses, each weighing 7 kg. In 2010 there was a surge in interest in the monument, upon which the local vow festival company made arrangements with the new landowner regarding visits, restorations, additions and a tribute day.

The number of crosses grew to 2,506 by 2020, 2,575 in 2022, and to just under 3,000 in 2023. One of them commemorates the well-known white supremacist and neo-Nazi, Eugène Terre'Blanche, who was murdered on his Ventersdorp farm by two of his employees after an altercation over unpaid wages.

In 2025, Elon Musk posted a clip that claimed that the crosses were “graves of white farmers in South Africa”, which attracted considerable media attention to the monument.

== Management and proceedings ==
The annually growing monument is a community project and is kept up to date and maintained annually with private donations. Lita Cross Fourie, who lost her parents and acquaintances in farm attacks, was at the head of proceedings from 2009 until her death in 2023, and kept the necessary statistics. Since the SAPS does not purposefully keep statistics about farm attacks and murders, the necessary statistics were supplemented from different websites, in addition to comprehensive statistics prepared by the Tabita organization, and information obtained from the book Treurgrond by Dirk Hermann, Chris van Zyl and Ilze Nieuwoudt which covers the period from 1990 to 2012.

Since the 2020 rally, arrangements have been made to access the site from the N1, bypassing the former detour. The 2020 rally was attended by over a thousand people, and 64 new crosses were planted. During 2023's evening program on the 15th of September, the crosses were illuminated, followed by a convoy march along the N1 on the morning of the 16th. This was followed by the handover of 47 new crosses and the firing of a replica of the Grietjie cannon.
