= South African farm attacks =

South African farm attacks (Afrikaans: plaasaanvalle) are violent crimes, including assault, murder, rape, and robbery, that take place on farms in South Africa. The attacks target both white and black farmers. The term has no formal legal definition, but such attacks have been the subject of discussion by media and public figures in South Africa and abroad.

Claims that such attacks on farmers disproportionately target white people are a key element of the white genocide conspiracy theory promoted by, among others, United States president Donald Trump, and have become a common talking point among white nationalists worldwide. Statistics provided from the South African Government show that farm attacks tend to take more black victims than white victims and show that farm attacks are relatively rare. Farm attacks form part of a broader crime problem in South Africa and do not have a racial motivation.

== Terminology and definition ==
South African statutory law does not define a "farm attack" as a specific crime. Rather, the term is used to refer to a number of different crimes committed against persons specifically on commercial farms or smallholdings. According to the South African Police Service (SAPS) National Operational Co-ordinating Committee:

Attacks on farms and smallholdings refer to acts aimed on the persons of residents, workers and visitors to farms and smallholdings, whether with the intent to murder, rape, rob or inflict bodily harm. In addition, all actions aimed at disrupting farming activities as a commercial concern, whether for motives related to ideology, labour disputes, land issues, revenge, grievances or intimidation, should be included.

This definition excludes "social fabric crimes", that is those crimes committed by members of the farming community on one another, such as domestic or workplace violence, and focuses on outsiders entering the farms to commit specific criminal acts. Dina Pule, the safety and security Member of the Executive Council (MEC) for Mpumalanga Province, has disagreed with this definition and has said that "farm attacks" included only those cases "where farm residents were murdered and not cases of robberies or attempted murders". Human Rights Watch has criticised the use of the term "farm attacks", which they regard as "suggesting a terrorist or military purpose", which they do not believe is the primary motivation for most farm attacks.

== Findings ==
The phenomenon, and the extent to which it is politicised, has been the focus of a number of investigations. The 2003 Report Of The Special Committee Of Inquiry Into Farm Attacks by the SAPS found that most incidents were driven by a desire for material gain and that "very few cases have political overtones."

There are insufficient data to reliably estimate a murder rate for South African farmers. South African government data indicated between 58 and 74 murders on farms annually in the period 2015–2017; out of an annual murder count of 20,000 total murders in South Africa; these figures are broadly consistent with figures collected by the Transvaal Agricultural Union (TAU), a farmers' union. Due to the problems associated with counting the number of South African farmers and farm murders, it is unclear whether farmers are at greater risk of being murdered than other South Africans.

Data released by the South African government in 2018 showed that the number of farm attacks had increased between 2012 and 2018, but that the number of murders on farms had decreased year by year during the period. During the same year farming organisation AgriSA reported on police statistics which suggested that the murder rate on farms had declined to the lowest level in 20 years, to a third of the level recorded in 1998.

== Motives ==
According to the South African government, the chief motive for attacks is robbery. A Committee of Inquiry into Farm Attacks was appointed in 2001 by the National Commissioner of Police. The purpose of the committee was to "inquire into the ongoing spate of attacks on farms, which include violent criminal acts such as murder, robbery, rape, to determine the motives and factors behind these attacks and to make recommendations on their findings". Monetary theft occurred in most of the attacks, firearms were stolen in 23.0%, and 16.0% of farm attacks involved vehicular theft. The committee noted that "there is a common misconception that in a large proportion of farm attacks little is stolen" and "various items are stolen by far in the majority of cases and, in those cases where nothing is taken, there is almost always a logical explanation, such as that the attackers had to leave quickly because help arrived."

The Natives' Land Act, adopted in 1913, restricted black South Africans' ownership of land and the right to legally rent land to around 10% of South Africa. The modern discontent among black South Africans has caused populists to call for a confiscation of white-owned farms in the north. The EFF political party, founded by Julius Malema, demands redistribution of the land and wealth, alongside pressure for land expropriation without compensation. As of March 2011, 31 million hectares or 25% of the 122 million hectares surface area of South Africa were in the hands of the State. The remaining 91 million hectares or 75% of the surface area was privately owned. Proponents of the theory that farm attacks disproportionately target white people point to racial hostility as a result of this situation as a motive for the attacks.

The apartheid era chants "One settler, one bullet" and Dubul'ibhunu ("Kill the Boer, Kill the Farmer") are often accused of inciting farm attacks or associated with the phenomenon. The leader of the EFF, Julius Malema, has repeatedly been involved in reciting the chant "Kill the Boer, Kill the Farmer" as one of the signature chants for his party, prompting criticism from within South Africa and abroad.

Johan Burger, a senior researcher at the Institute for Security Studies (ISS), has said that attacks were typically motivated not by race but by greed. The South African Police Service (SAPS) declared in 1998 that there had been no evidence at the time of systematic organised attacks, although the matter was being looked into by special investigators resulting in the Report Of The Special Committee Of Inquiry Into Farm Attacks (2003).

== Statistics ==
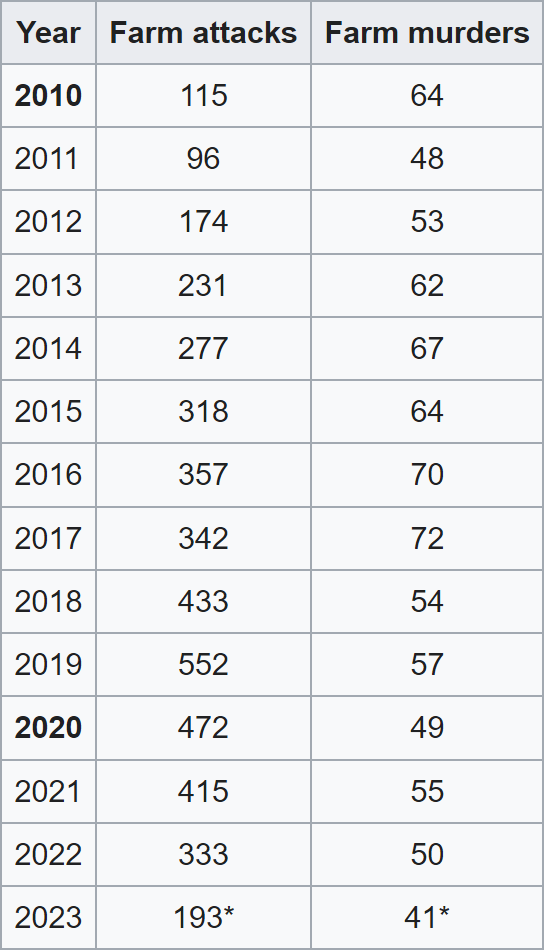
Recorded farm attacks (4,308) and farm murders (806) from 2010 to the end of August 2023

Prior to 2007 statistics on attacks on farms and smallholdings were collected by both Agri SA, the National Operational Coordination Committee (NOCO), and the Crime Information Analysis Centre (CIAC) of the SAPS. Each organisation had varying degrees of accuracy and completeness due to issues with getting local police stations to regularly and accuratly report this crime type. The SAPS stopped releasing homicide statistics on farm murders in 2007 instead merging them with all homicide figures, this has increased the difficulty of accessing reliable statistics on the phenomenon with most studies since relying on data from the Transvaal Agricultural Union of South Africa (TAUSA) instead.

Johan Burger of the Institute for Security Studies has stated that statistics provided by the TAUSA significantly under reports the number of violent attacks on farmers as they are not informed of incidents on smallholdings. Attacks on smallholdings account for up to 40% of violent incidents classified as 'farm attacks.' This, Burger argues, indicates that statistics on farm attacks since 2007 likely under report the phenomenon.

In 2003 the Freedom Front political party stated that farmers were "being murdered at a rate of 274 per 100,000" whilst the national murder rate was 61 per 100,000 people. The Freedom Front also alleged that Afrikaners specifically were being singled out for attacks.

According to media reports, as of December 2011, approximately 3,158–3,811 South African farmers have been killed in these attacks. Self-reported data from the TAUSA state that 1,544 people were killed in farm attacks from 1990 to 2012. In 2012, Reuters reported that the number of farmers of European descent had decreased by one third since 1997, and that news headlines about farm killings provided incentive for them to sell their properties. A 2012 report by the South African Institute of Race Relations estimated that farmers were between 2 and 3 times more likely to become victims of homicides than other members of society.

During the South Africa's hard lockdown early in the COVID-19 pandemic, crime, including rural crime, decreased. The opposition Democratic Alliance (DA) political party claimed that they increased once the lockdown restrictions were lifted. Agriculture organisations the TAUSA, and Free State Agriculture stated that attacks and murders had increased over the full year in 2020.

Farm attacks registered by SAAU / Agri SA
Year	Attacks	Murders
1991	327	66
1992	365	63
1993	442	84
1994	442	92
1995	551	121
1996	468	109
1997	470	142

Farm attacks registered by the CIAC
Year	Attacks	Murders
1997	433	84
1998	769	142
1999	813	144
2000	906	144
2001	1011	147

Farm attacks registered by the NOCOC
Year	Attacks	Murders
1998	835	157
1999	853	138
2000	894	122
2001	962	124

== Criticism of response ==
Gideon Meiring, chairperson of the TAUSA's safety and security committee, criticised the South African Police Service for failing to prevent farm attacks, stating that the police "are not part of the solution but part of the bloody problem". Meiring has assisted farming communities in setting up private armed patrols in their area. Kallie Kriel of AfriForum accused politicians, including Agriculture Minister Lulu Xingwana and her deputy Dirk du Toit, of inciting hatred against farmers, saying "Those who inflame hate and aggression towards farmers have to be regarded as accomplices to the murders of farmers." In particular, Kriel condemned claims that violence against farm workers by farmers was endemic.

Johan Burger of the Institute for Security Studies has said that the government's dismantling of the commando system had created a vacuum which the current rural safety plan was not addressing adequately. Defence Minister Mosiuoa Lekota said that the military commando personnel were "unwilling to serve a black government and were hostile to democracy in South Africa", adding that "former commando members were politically indoctrinated and supplied with weapons and training to spy on blacks in their areas, making this military structure wholly unsuited to the new South Africa."

While Human Rights Watch has described a general trend of escalation in "farm attacks" since 1994, and noted a lack of government response to them, its 2001 study found that the failures of the government response disproportionately affected black farm residents. "In practice, however, the plan has significantly increased insecurity for black residents of and visitors to commercial farming areas, as they have become the targets of sometimes indiscriminate "anti-crime" initiatives ... In addition, the rural protection plan has largely failed to respond to crime committed against black farm residents, in particular crime committed by white farm owners."

== Prevention ==
While the police are supposed to regularly visit commercial farms to ensure security, they say they cannot provide effective protection due to the wide areas that need to be covered and a lack of funding. 'Farmwatch' groups have been formed with the intention of filling this protection gap. These groups use radio to coordinate mutual assistance between farmers, local Commando volunteers, and private security companies. The particular mix of groups that operate has varied by area, with wealthier farmers being more likely to employ private security firms. The police and these groups are linked together as part of the Rural Protection Plan, created in 1997 by President Nelson Mandela. Some white farmers have undertaken self-defence training, with some farmers trained by an Israeli special forces veteran.

In 2003 the government began disbanding commando units, saying they had been "part of the apartheid state's security apparatus". A 2013 study from the University of the Free State concluded that this disbanding compromised rural security, as police have prioritised South Africa's urban crime problems.

== Protest action ==
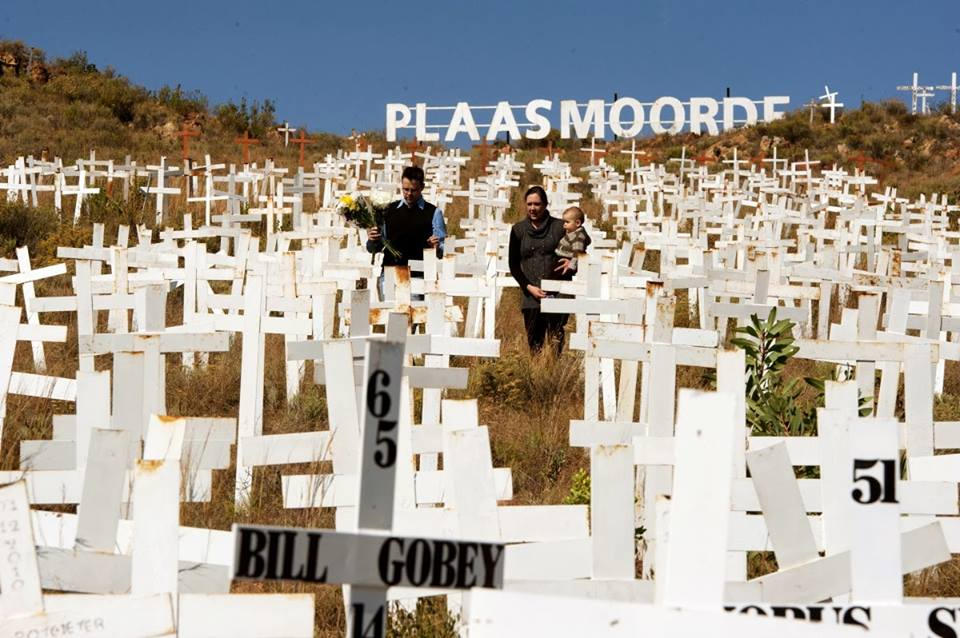
The Witkruis Monument outside Polokwane, a series of crosses erected in memory of murdered South African farmers

A spike in violent attacks on farmers in February 2017 led to one of the country's largest prayer meetings being held on 22–23 April 2017 in Bloemfontein, attracting over 1,000,000 participants.

Following the murder of Klapmuts farmer Joubert Conradie in October 2017, a protest convoy was organised on 30 October 2017. Known as #BlackMonday the convoy ran from Stellenbosch to Cape Town and attracted an estimated 10,000 protesters. The protest convoy was criticised by the South African Police Service for disrupting traffic. The protest convoy was also criticised by the ANC and the EFF for the display by some protesters of the old South African flag - which is generally regarded as a symbol of the racist Apartheid era regime. Displaying the flag has since been made illegal as hate speech - and alleged that the protesters were only concerned about the death of white farmers and did not include black members of the farming community. These photos were later confirmed to have been used out of context and inappropriately linked to the protests by Nickolaus Bauer, a reporter from eNCA. The eNCA released an official apology regarding the untruthful reporting. The Nelson Mandela Foundation also criticised the event for being polarising, describing the protesters' "expressions of 'us' and 'them'" as "worrisome".

In October 2020, protesters stormed Senekal Magistrates Court, where two suspects were being held for the murder of farm manager Brendin Horner. A police vehicle was also overturned and set on fire. One man was arrested for setting the vehicle ablaze.

There is a wall of remembrance outside the town of Bothaville dedicated to farmers who lost their lives during farm attacks.

== Reactions ==
Following a spate of attacks in the Western Cape in late 2018, the Western Cape branch of the African National Congress (ANC) issued a condemnation of all farm attacks and called on the police to increase efforts to catch perpetrators and prevent attacks. The FF+ has continuously campaigned against farm attacks in South Africa.

=== International reactions ===
The Suidlanders, a survivalist Afrikaner group preparing for a race war predicted by Boer "prophet" Siener van Rensburg, has taken credit for publicising the issue internationally after undertaking a tour of the United States in 2017.

==== Australia ====
After an Australian journalist was given a guided tour of South Africa by Afriforum, stories about attacks on white farmers appeared in News Corp Australia newspapers claiming that white South Africans were "trapped like frogs in boiling water" and that the South African government was "notoriously corrupt" and "potentially complicit" in the attacks and stating that the farmers were being "persecuted" because of their race.

In March 2018, Australia's Minister for Home Affairs, Peter Dutton, proposed fast-tracking white South African farmers as refugees, stating that "they need help from a civilised country", amid pressure by the South African Australian community for a special immigration intake for their family members. Far-right marchers from the Australian Liberty Alliance in Perth carried signs exhorting the Australian government to "let the right ones [white South Africans] in", and MPs Andrew Hastie and Ian Goodenough headlined a rally in Perth, which was also attended by far-right extremist Neil Erikson, while senator Fraser Anning and MP Andrew Laming appeared at a Brisbane rally that was also attended by members of the far-right group, the Proud Boys. Dutton's proposal reportedly got support from some of his party's backbenchers and Liberal Democrat Senator David Leyonhjelm; however, Leyonhjelm later clarified that he thought that South African farmers could be admitted under existing family reunification and skilled visa programmes, and that he did not believe that they qualified as refugees.

The Australian High Commissioner was subjected to a démarche by the South African Department of International Relations & Co-operation, which expressed offence at Dutton's statements, and demanded a retraction, stating that "there is no reason for any government in the world to suspect that a section of South Africans is under danger from their own democratically elected government". Afrikaner groups including AfriForum and the Suidlanders, who took credit for Dutton's offer, rejected the idea of Afrikaners becoming refugees.

Australia's ruling Coalition MPs subsequently stated that white farmers were entitled to apply for humanitarian visas, without necessarily meeting the definition of "refugees", describing the situation as difficult and unique but without calling for a special category of visa to be created. The Australian government effectively retracted Dutton's offer by responding to the démarche with a letter that "satisfied" the South African foreign ministry, with the South African government officially welcoming the letter and stating again that "...no one is being persecuted in South Africa, including white farmers". However, Dutton reiterated his position that the farmers were persecuted, denied any retraction, and insisted that the Australian government was looking at "several" individual cases that may qualify for humanitarian visas, stating that his critics were "dead to me".

In April 2018, it emerged that Dutton's department had previously blocked asylum applications by a white farmer, and another white South African woman on the basis that "the vast majority of crimes against whites are not racially motivated", and on the basis that there was no evidence of racial persecution, with the decisions upheld by the Administrative Appeals Tribunal.

AfriForum toured Australia in October 2018 to "raise awareness" of farm attacks, appearing on Sky News Australia program Outsiders, where a member was interviewed by Ross Cameron and Rowan Dean, and they met Andrew Hastie and delivered a presentation before the Parliament of Western Australia.

==== United States ====
In August 2018, Fox News host Tucker Carlson commented that the South African government had disproportionately targeted white farmers during its ongoing land reform efforts due to anti-white racism. He also criticised political "elites", who are purportedly concerned about racism, but "paying no attention" to the "racist government of South Africa". However, BBC News, CBS News, Associated Press, PolitiFact, The New York Times and The Wall Street Journal described Carlson's segment as false or misleading. President Ramaphosa had proposed a constitutional amendment that would allow some land to be expropriated without compensation; however, that amendment had not yet been voted upon as of August 2018.

Following Carlson's segment, President Donald Trump instructed Secretary of State Mike Pompeo to study the South Africa land and farm seizures and expropriations and the large scale killing of farmers closely, tweeting: "South African Government is now seizing land from white farmers". Trump's tweet was denounced as "misinformed" by the South African government, which stated that it would address the matter through diplomatic channels. Political officers of the American embassy in South Africa investigated the claims, consulting farmers, police, and academics for further information. In a cable sent to the State Department, they concluded that there was "no evidence that murders on farms specifically target white people or are politically motivated" and that "[s]ome journalists and lobby groups have simplified complex land disputes to serve their own ends". AfriForum took credit for Carlson and Trump's statements, stating that it believed that its campaign to influence American politics had succeeded.

In 2018, Afriforum leaders also embarked on a tour of the US to "raise awareness" about farm attacks in South Africa and land expropriation.

In a televised meeting held with Cyril Ramaphosa and members of the South African government on 21 May 2025, Donald Trump falsely claimed that the attacks formed part of an ongoing genocide against South Africa's white minority.

== White genocide conspiracy theory ==
The claim of a white genocide in South Africa has been promoted by right-wing groups in South Africa and the United States and is a frequent talking point among white nationalists. There are no reliable figures that suggest that white farmers are at greater risk of being killed than the average South African. Some Black South Africans have sought to seize privately owned land which they have made claims to; however, South African police have stopped such attempts at appropriating land.

Fact checkers have widely identified the notion of a white genocide in South Africa as a falsehood or myth. The government of South Africa and other analysts maintain that farm attacks are part of a broader crime problem in South Africa, and do not have a racial motivation. The group AfriForum claim that some attacks are racially motivated as does the Freedom Front Plus political party.
