= Flip Buys =

South African trade union leader

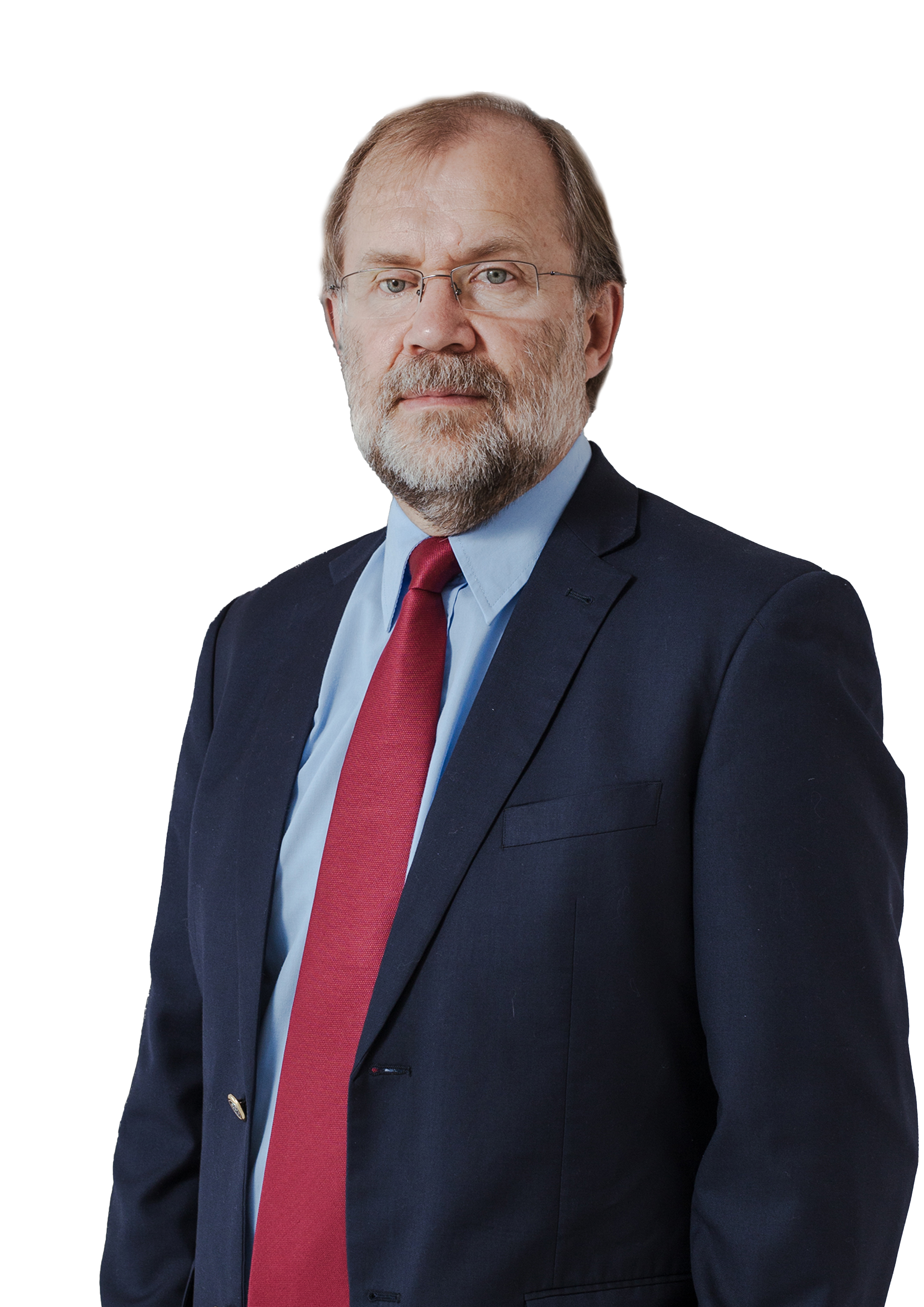
Flip Buys

Philippus Jacobus Wilhelmus Buys (born 1 March 1963) is a South African trade union leader and the chairperson of the Solidarity Movement.

Born in Delareyville, Buys obtained a degree in Communication Studies, with Political Science as his other major subject, from the Potchefstroom University in 1988. In 1992 he obtained an honours degree in Labour Relations from the University of Johannesburg. During his university years, Buys was a member of the Puk Student Council, chairperson of the Chess Club, deputy chairperson of the mission work organisation, Hulpprojek, and editor of the opinion magazine, Perspektief. He also attended courses in political economics at the University of the Witwatersrand and project management at the NWU.

He began working as an industrial relations officer at Eskom, then in 1992 moved to work as an organiser for the Mine Workers' Union (MWU). In 1994, he served on the Volkstaat Council, which investigated the potential of an Afrikaner Volkstaat. Buys served as council member and member of the executive committee of the North-West University for seven years.

In 1997, he became CEO of the MWU. Under Buys' leadership, the union was renamed as Solidarity. After being elected as General Secretary of the MWU, Buys’s first step was to expand the MWU into Solidarity by restructuring, modernising and extending the organisation to be of service to the entire workforce of Afrikaans-speaking people. As the leader of Solidarity, Buys transformed the union into a dynamic movement that went beyond workers’ rights only. He led Solidarity from a traditional union to a movement that actively promotes Afrikaners’ economic and cultural interests.

The Solidarity Movement currently consists of more than 25 institutions founded by Buys, which, among others, include:

- The trade union organization, Solidarity
- The civil rights and community safety organization, AfriForum
- The social welfare organization, Solidarity Helping Hand
- Cultural and heritage organizations such as the Federation of Afrikaans Cultural Organizations (FAK) and AfriForum Theatre
- Various training institutions such as the higher education institution Akademia, private vocational training colleges Sol-*Tech and Bo-Karoo Training, as well as the educational institution Solidarity School Support Centre (SOS)
- The media organization Maroela Media
- Various property and development organizations such as Kanton and the Orania Development Company
- Various financial and investment institutions and funds

In his position as chairperson, Buys is actively involved in current political affairs in South Africa, advocating for the Afrikaner people. His motto is: "Afrikaners should live freely, safely and prosperously at the southern tip of Africa".

Trade union offices
Preceded by Peet Ungerer	General Secretary of Solidarity; 1997–present	Succeeded by Incumbent
