= De Goede Hoop Hostel =

Private hostel in Pretoria, South Africa

Coordinates: 25.75044°S 28.24187°E

De Goede Hoop is a private, Afrikaans language, Christian hostel geared towards male and female students at the University of Pretoria. The hostel was founded in 2017 by the civil rights organization AfriForum. The foundation made headlines because Afrikaans was the only language used there and they did not follow the university's rules that residence halls must be 43% black. In 2017, the hostel housed 66 students, every single one of them white. One black student was accepted for accommodation, but was rejected for financial reasons.

Most students at De Goede Hoop are between 19 and 25 years old.

It is located on the corner of Reitz and Verdoorn Streets in Sunnyside, Pretoria, 1.8 km from the UP main campus and 3 km from the Groenkloof campus.

== Foundation ==
Plans were made for the hostel beginning in 2015. In 2016, an opening date was slated for January 28, 2017. AfriForum's stated purpose for founding the hostel was to allow Afrikaner students to participate in student life, after the organization came under pressure during the FeesMustFall protests, during which thousands protested against high class and residence fees and the use of Afrikaans as a language of instruction. The latter was abolished at the university. Cornelius Jansen van Rensburg is the chair of the residents' board.

== Registration with the University ==
The De Goede Hoop student organization was recognized by the university in 2016. Residents of the hall could participate in University-sanctioned organizations and activities by virtue of this registration, but the student organization's recognition was withdrawn in 2017.

== Criticism ==
Around two months after the hostel opened, its nature aroused controversy. According to the activist Yusuf Abramjee, De Goede Hoop had an "exclusive" character tantamount to segregation. Abramjee filed a complaint with the university as well as with the Commission for the Promotion and Protection of the Rights of Cultural, Religious and Linguistic Communities.

=== Reaction of the University of Pretoria ===
University spokeswoman Candice Jooste condemned the hostel "strongly" and distanced the institution from it. On March 27, 2017, Rikus Delport, another university spokesperson, banned the hostel from participating in all university events. He also maintained that it held "discriminatory admission requirements.
