= Tom Matthews (trade unionist) =

Tom Matthews (1866 – 10 March 1915) was an English-born trade unionist, active in South Africa and the United States.

Matthews was born in Newlyn in Cornwall. He emigrated to the United States in 1882, where he worked as an ore miner. He was elected as president of the Butte district of the Western Miners' Association, and was arrested for his role in the Great Idaho Strike. In 1892, Matthews was elected to the Montana House of Representatives, representing the People's Party, the only representative of the labour movement to win a seat. He was elected as its speaker, serving until 1894.

Matthew returned to Cornwall, and studied at the Camborne School of Mines before, in 1897, emigrating to the Witwatersrand in South Africa. Two years later, he was a founder member of the International Independent Labour Party. In 1907, he was elected as vice president of the Transvaal Miners' Association, and played a leading role in that year's strike. After its conclusion, he was elected as general secretary of the union, which became the Mine Workers' Union in 1913. While the union had previously had a frequent leadership turnover, Matthews remained in post until his death from phthisis.

Political offices
Preceded by Harry Comly	Speaker of the Montana House of Representatives; 1892–1894	Succeeded by Wilbra Swett
Trade union offices
Preceded by M. Trewick	General Secretary of the Mine Workers' Union; 1908–1915	Succeeded by James Forrester-Brown
