= Kommandokorps =

Afrikaner survivalist paramilitary organization

Flag of Kommandokorps.

Kommandokorps is an Afrikaner far-right survivalist group active in South Africa. The leader is Colonel Franz Jooste, who served with the South African Defence Force during the apartheid era.

The Kommandokorps organises paramilitary camps, which are attended by youths between the ages of 13 and 19. The teenagers are taught self-defence and how to combat a perceived black enemy. Following an infantry-style curriculum, they are lectured on racial differences, such as a claim that black people had a smaller cerebral cortex than whites, and are made to use a modern South African flag as a doormat. The camp is located in the veld outside the town of Carolina, Mpumalanga, about 230 km east of Johannesburg.

Kommandokorps has been criticised by the Afrikaner lobby group AfriForum. The Democratic Alliance called for the group to be closed, and its activities investigated by the Human Rights Commission. A group of Kommandokorps volunteers attended the funeral of the former Afrikaner Weerstandsbeweging leader Eugene Terreblanche. In 2011, the group signed a saamstaanverdrag (unity pact) with the Afrikaner Weerstandsbeweging and the Suidlanders, a large group which advocates for white rights in post-apartheid South Africa and publicizes its belief that there is an ongoing genocide against whites, in particular farmers, in the country.

Fatherland is a full-length documentary produced and directed by Tarryn Lee Crossman that explores the experiences of young men in the Kommandokorps camps.

== See also ==
- Afrikaner Weerstandsbeweging
