= Herstigte Nasionale Party =

Political party in South Africa

Herstigte Nasionale Party Re-established National Party
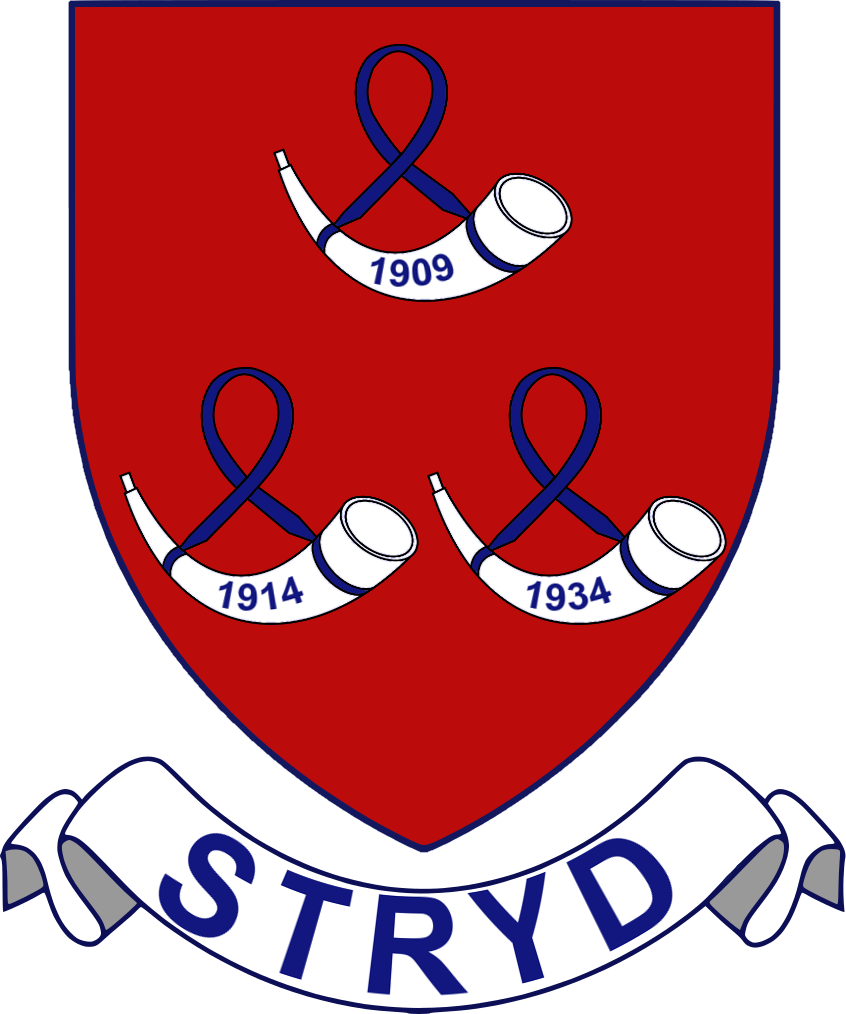
- Abbreviation: HNP
- Leader: Fritz van Graan
- Founder: Albert Hertzog
- Founded: 25 October 1969; 56 years ago
- Split from: National Party
- Headquarters: 199 Neethling Street, Eloffsdal, Pretoria
- Newspaper: Die Afrikaner
- Ideology: Afrikaner nationalism Christian nationalism Verwoerdianism; Apartheid; Neo-fascism; White supremacy Anti-British sentiment Anti-liberalism; Anti-communism opposition to the Volkstaat idea
- Political position: Far-right
- Religion: Calvinism
- Colours: Red Orange, white and blue
- Slogan: Dié land is ons land (This land is our land)

Party flag
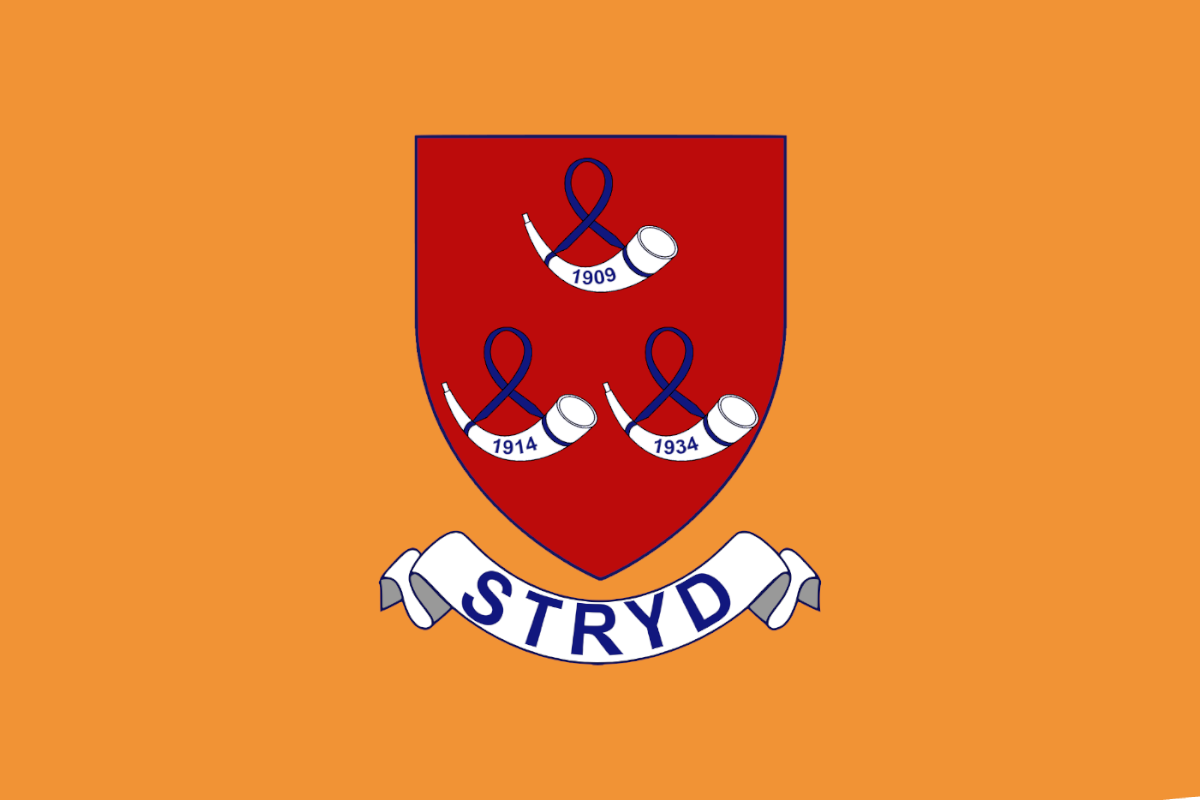

Website
- www.hnp.org.za (in Afrikaans)

The Herstigte Nasionale Party (lit. 'Re-established National Party') is a South African political party which was formed as a far-right splinter group of the now defunct National Party (NP) in 1969. The party name was commonly abbreviated as HNP, evoking the Herenigde Nasionale Party, although colloquially they were also known as the Herstigtes. The party is, unlike other splinter factions from the National Party, still active but politically irrelevant.

== History ==
=== Formation ===
The HNP was formed in 1969 by Albert Hertzog (son of former Prime Minister General JBM Hertzog) in protest against the decision by Prime Minister B.J. Vorster to authorize the presence of Maori players and spectators during the tour of New Zealand rugby union team in South Africa in 1970. He was also against Vorster's re-establishment of diplomatic relations with Malawi and that country's appointment of a Black ambassador to South Africa. The name was chosen to reflect the initials of the earlier Herenigde Nasionale Party (Reunited National Party), the name used by the National Party in the election of 1948. Seeking a return to Calvinism as the basis of South Africa, the party advocated complete racial segregation and the adoption of Afrikaans as the only official language. The bulk of the membership of the new party was made up of rural and small town working and lower middle class Afrikaners who resented what they saw as the National Party devoting their attentions to the concerns of urban Afrikaner elites. The Afrikaner Broederbond denied membership to any HNP member.

The party contested the 1970 general election although its campaign was the subject of government crackdowns and attacks. The party's 78 candidates were all defeated, including its four Members of Parliament, all of whom had been National Party members before defecting to the new HNP. The party also contested 50 seats in the 1974 general election but failed to make an impact in an election where reformists advanced. During this election the HNP boycotted the English language press, as the party opposed the use of the language. It also contested three by-elections in 1975 and 1976 and enjoyed some growth, taking second place ahead of the United Party in the two seats that that group contested. The HNP captured 3.3% of the vote in the 1977 general election before increasing to 14.1% in 1981 as right wing disenchantment with the NP grew, but on no occasion did it win any seats and its newly acquired voters soon shifted their support to the Conservative Party.

Eugène Terre'Blanche had been a member of the HNP, but broke with the group in 1973, after becoming disillusioned with their adherence to electoral politics. He then established the paramilitary Afrikaner Weerstandsbeweging. He also differed from the HNP in his belief in the establishment of a white homeland in South Africa, something the HNP rejected as unnecessary.

=== Emergence in the 1980s ===
Under the leadership of Jaap Marais, the former deputy leader who replaced the retiring Hertzog in 1977, the party emerged as a force amongst white South Africans. In 1979 the evidence of its potential was demonstrated in a series of by-elections when it seemed to threaten the position of the ruling party. In a near-breakthrough focused on right-wing Afrikaners dissatisfied with the Botha government, it obtained 14.1% support in the 1981 general election. In the constituency of Rustenburg, the HNP candidate came hundreds of votes from besting the incumbent National MP, but to no avail. In October 1985 the party's general secretary Louis Stofberg won a by-election in Sasolburg on a campaign based on the presence of a mixed couple in the constituency and opposition to the tax system, in which the wealthier white population paid more tax than the other ethnic groups. The victory came in the midst of a failed electoral alliance between the HNP and the Conservative Party that had been established earlier that year, with Andries Treurnicht claiming it was a first step to merging the HNP into the Conservatives, something the conviction-oriented Marais firmly opposed. With the CP not filing a candidate, Stofberg represented the constituency for two years as a sole voice attacking the NP from the right. From 1987, the CP captured the role of official opposition under Treurnicht with strong support from Afrikaner voters and so the electoral basis for the HNP was drained.

The HNP effectively remained the chief voice of the uncompromising far-right, however, particularly in 1989 when both the Afrikaner Weerstandsbeweging and the Boerestaat Party declared their support for Marais over Treurnicht, who despite his stances was considered a pragmatic opportunist, with a long background in the NP under Vorster's and Botha's leadership. Its only previous contact with other parties had been in 1985 with a brief co-operation with the Conservative Party to oppose the repeal of the Prohibition of Mixed Marriages Act and the Immorality Amendment Act by P.W. Botha, both part of a cosmetic reform programme aimed at improving the image of apartheid South Africa, which Treurnicht decried as "multiracialism". Although the AWB did not set up an official political wing and did not officially endorse the HNP, its long-time leader Eugene Terre'Blanche had previously run for office under the HNP banner.

==== Network with other organisations ====
On the international stage, the HNP built up a number of contacts with far-right groups in Europe and for a time during the 1980s it was responsible for funding the United Kingdom-based League of Saint George. It was also closely associated with the South African National Front (SANF), an overseas branch of the National Front in the United Kingdom. Between 1980 and 1987 the party bankrolled the English-speaking far-right journal South African Patriot, edited by SANF members John Hiddleston and then Alan Harvey.

=== Post-apartheid ===
The HNP joined the Afrikaner Volksfront of General Constand Viljoen in 1991, but the front collapsed in 1994 when many of the members refused to participate in South Africa's first non-racial elections. The HNP drifted away from Viljoen and did not join his Freedom Front party. As a result, it has become something of a marginal force in contemporary South Africa, arguing for the self-determination of white Afrikaners and a return to Verwoerdian apartheid. The party motto is now "This land is our land" (Afrikaans: Dié Land is ons Land).

It re-emerged in 2004, when the party lodged an official complaint against the SABC 3 television channel when it broadcast a play entitled ID, which satirised the killing of Hendrik Verwoerd. Although the HNP argued that it portrayed Verwoerd and his supporters unfairly, the complaint was rejected by the Broadcasting Complaints Commission of South Africa.

Jaap Marais died in 2000, and was replaced as leader by Willie Marais. Willie Marais died in December 2007, and was replaced by Japie Theart. The present leader is Fritz van Graan. Two splits have occurred from the party over ideology and tactics: the Afrikaner Nationalist Movement in 2004, and the Afrikaner Volksparty in 2008.

== Ideology ==
When founded, the HNP emphasised above all its Afrikaner identity, attacking immigration, seeking to downgrade the importance of the English language, and endorsing apartheid. The party also launched an attack on the materialism that it felt was taking over South African society and thus sought to present itself as the voice of working class Afrikaners. It frequently attacked the "liberalism" of the National Party regime, arguing that it was gradually diluting apartheid and offering too many concessions to non-Whites.

The party rejects the idea of a separate Volkstaat specifically for Afrikaners, claiming all of South Africa for Afrikaners instead. It believes that the interests of the black population will be sufficiently met in the former black homelands. The HNP has no clear plan for how a return to Apartheid South Africa could be achieved. The party also emphasises the importance of Calvinism to the South African identity.

The party does not recognise the new order in South Africa and, as part of its policy of resistance, encourages people not to vote. That makes it impossible to determine the exact level of support the party has.

== Namibia ==
While South Africa administered Namibia until 1988, the party was active in the country in opposition to independence and black rights. It contested the first multi-ethnic election in 1978, capturing 1.8% of the vote, or 10% of the White vote. The election resulted in a landslide win for the Democratic Turnhalle Alliance of Namibia, albeit with the main black opposition parties, the South West Africa People's Organization and the Namibia National Front, excluded from the ballot.

== Election results ==
National Assembly
Election year	# of total votes	% of overall vote	# of seats won	Rank
1970	53 763 ▲	3.57% ▲	0	3/4 ▲
1974	39 568▼	3.6% ▲	0	4/5 ▼
1977	34 161 ▼	3.2% ▼	0	4/5
1981	192 304 ▲	14.09% ▲	0	3/4 ▲
1987	62 888 ▼	3.1% ▼	0	4/5 ▼
1989	5,416 ▼	0.2% ▼	0	4/4 ▲

== Leaders ==
Year	Name	Period	Time in office	Deputy leader/s
1969	Albert Hertzog	1969–1977	8 years	
1977	Jaap Marais	1977–2000	23 years	
2000	Willie Marais	2000–2007	7 years	
2007	Japie Theart	2007–2010	3 years	
2010	Andries Breytenbach	2010–present	incumbent	
