= Willie Marais =

South African politician

Willie Marais (10 August 1928 – 26 December 2007) was an Afrikaner nationalist and the leader of the far-right South African political party, the Herstigte Nasionale Party, from 2001 until his death. In 1969, when he was MP for Wonderboom, he resigned from the National Party in sympathy with the expelled Albert Hertzog.

He died on 26 December 2007 from a heart attack while on holiday.
