= North-West University =

Public university in South Africa

Coordinates: 26.693492°S 27.093062°E

- Tswana: Yunibesiti ya Bokone-Bophirima; Afrikaans: Noordwes-Universiteit; Sotho: Yunivesithi ya Leboya Bophirima
- Former names: Potchefstroom University for Christian Higher Education; Potchefstroom University; University of Bophuthatswana
- Motto: Dit Begin Alles Hier (Afrikaans)
- Motto in English: It All Starts Here
- Type: Public university
- Established: 2004 (by merger of existing institutions)
- Affiliations: AAU; ACU; HESA
- Chancellor: Dr Anna Mokgokong
- Vice-Chancellor: Prof Bismark Tyobeka
- Students: 56,000
- Location: Potchefstroom; Mahikeng; Vanderbijlpark, South Africa
- Campus: Suburban
- Colours: Purple, turquoise and grey
- Nickname: NWU
- Mascots: Eagi (main mascot); Mafika, Pukki, Vuvu (siblings)
- Website: www.nwu.ac.za

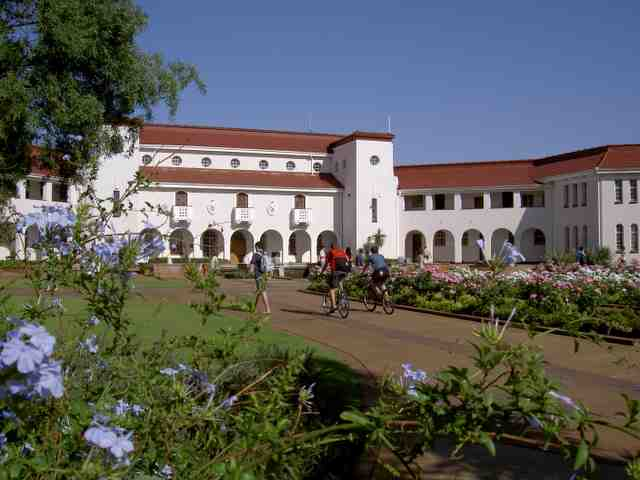
Potchefstroom campus

The North-West University (NWU) is a public research university located on three campuses in Potchefstroom, Mahikeng and Vanderbijlpark in South Africa.

== History ==
The university came into existence through the merger in 2004 of the Potchefstroom University for Christian Higher Education, a large, historical university dating back to 1869, which also had a branch in Vanderbijlpark, and the University of North-West (formerly the University of Bophuthatswana). With its merged status, the North-West University became one of the largest universities in South Africa with the third largest student population (full-time and distance education) in the country.

As of 2023, NWU ranks among top universities locally, in Africa and globally. In 2024, NWU became a member and service provider of AGRIS. In 2025, construction began on the Desmond Tutu School of Medicine at the university’s Potchefstroom Campus. Once completed, it will become South Africa’s 11th medical school and is expected to enroll its first students in 2028.

== Campuses ==
- Mahikeng Campus
- Potchefstroom Campus (main campus)
- Vanderbijlpark Campus

== Notable alumni ==
Among the notable alumni of the university following the merger are:

- Dirk Hermann, trade unionist and head of Solidarity
- Katlego Maboe, television presenter
- Gerhard Mostert, rugby player
- Demi-Leigh Nel-Peters, Miss Universe 2017
- Mamokgethi Phakeng, former vice-chancellor of the University of Cape Town
- Arrie Rautenbach, group CEO of Absa Group Limited since March 2022
- Warren Whiteley, rugby player

University rankings

Global – Overall
- QS World: 951-1000 (2026)

== Rankings ==
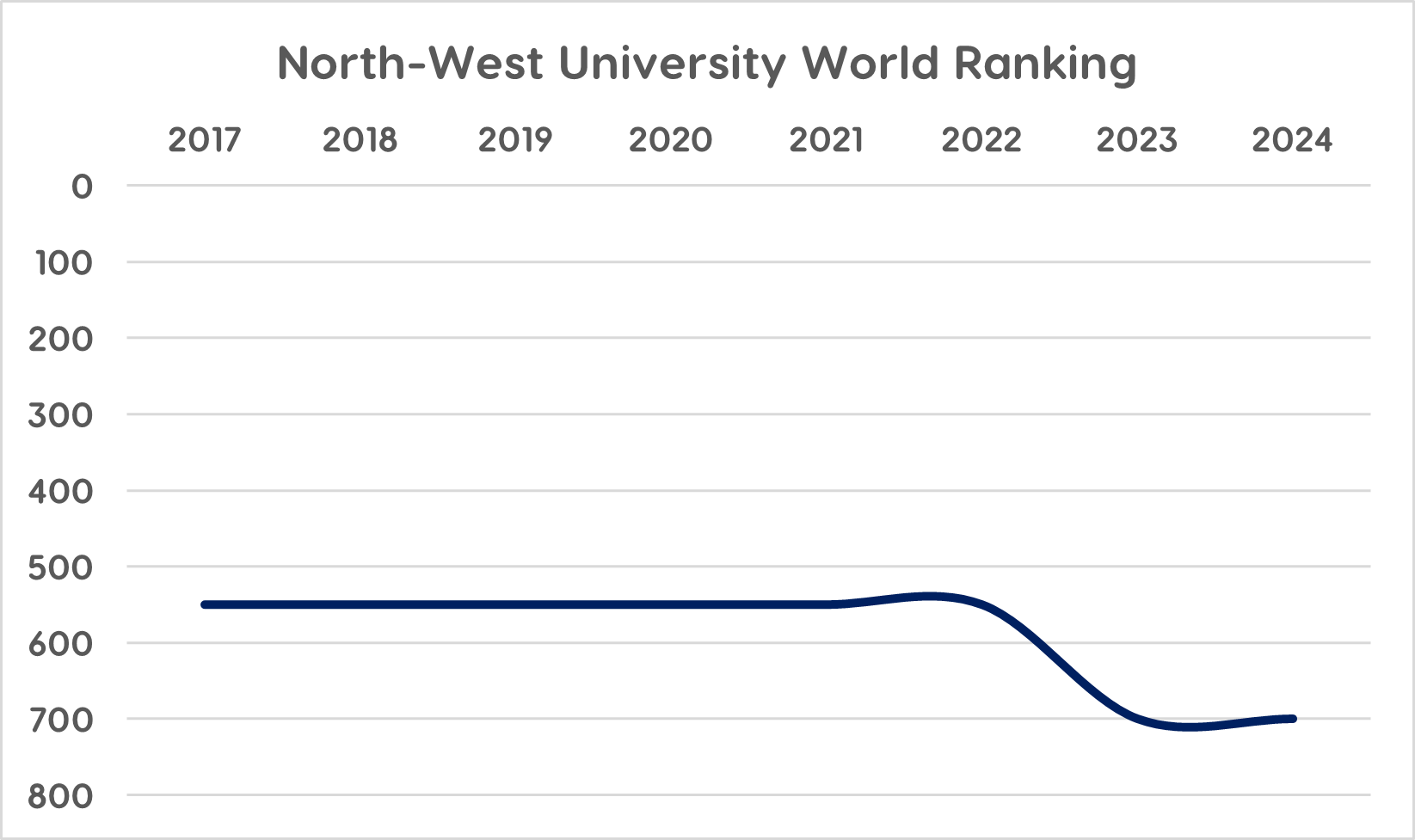
North-West University world ranking

NWU Times Higher Education ranking 2019 to 2024
Year	World rank
2024	601–800
2023	601–800
2022	501–600
2021	501–600
2020	501–600
2019	501–600

== Faculties ==
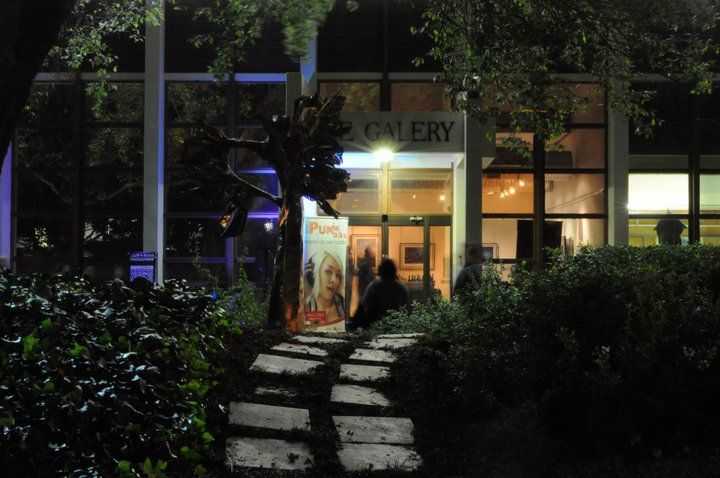
The North-West University Gallery

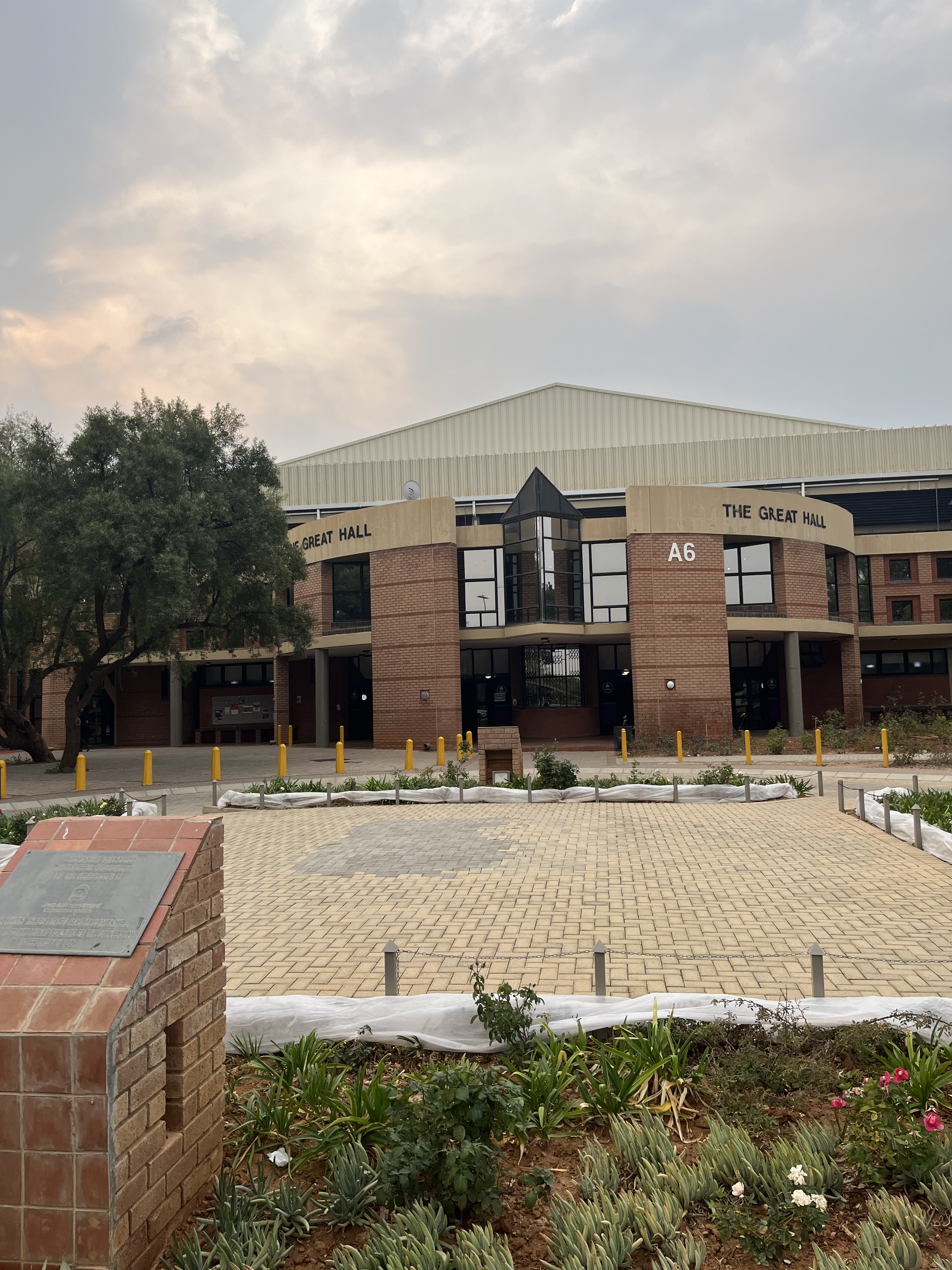
The Great Hall at North West University, Mahikeng Campus

The university is home to eight faculties:

- Economic and Management Sciences
  - Accounting Sciences
  - Business and Governance (Business School)
  - Economic Sciences
  - Industrial Psychology and Human Resource Management
  - Management Sciences
  - Tourism
- Education
  - Language Education
  - Psycho-Social Education
  - Professional Studies in Education
  - Mathematics, Science and Technology Education
  - Commerce and Social Studies in Education
- Engineering
  - Chemical and Minerals Engineering
  - Electrical, Electronic and Computer Engineering
  - Mechanical and Nuclear Engineering
  - Industrial Engineering
- Health Sciences
  - Human Movement Sciences
  - Kinderkinetics
  - Pharmacy
  - Psychosocial Health
  - Physiology
  - Consumer Sciences
  - Nutrition
  - Occupational Hygiene
  - Nursing
- Humanities
  - Communication Studies
  - Government Studies
  - Languages
  - Music
  - Philosophy
  - Social Sciences
- Law
  - BA (Law)
  - Bcom (Law)
  - LLB
  - LLM Course Work
  - LLD
- Natural and Agricultural Sciences
  - Physical and Chemical Sciences
  - Biological Sciences
  - Geo- and Spatial Sciences
  - Agricultural Sciences
  - Mathematical and Statistical Sciences
  - Computer Science and Information Systems
  - Business Mathematics and Statistics
- Theology
  - Christian Ministry and Leadership
  - Ancient Language and Text Studies

== Chancellors ==
- HM. Leruo Molotlegi, 2004–2019
- Dr. Anna Mokgokong, 2019–2025 (vice chancellor)

== Student profile ==
Ethnic enrolment, 2021	Percentage	Total number
African	64,17%	28 005
White	30,85%	13,466
Coloured	3,67%	1602
Asian	1,18%	516
Other	0,12%	53
Total	100%	43,642

University of North West staff by race and gender (2021)
Race	Total number	Percentage	Female	Male
African	2,694	40.54%	1,375	1,319
Coloured	380	5.72%	221	159
Asian	114	1.72%	59	55
White	3,456	52.02%	2,033	1,423
Total	6,644	100%	3,684	2,960
