= Basic Education Laws Amendment Act, 2024 =

The Basic Education Laws Amendment Act, 2024 (BELA), enacted by the Parliament of the Republic of South Africa, introduces significant reforms to existing education legislation. The bill was signed into law by the President on 13 September 2024.

The Act introduces amendments to the South African Schools Act, 1996, and the Employment of Educators Act, 1998. The law is part of ongoing efforts to enhance equity, accountability, and educational standards across South Africa's schooling system.

== See also ==
- Education in South Africa
- Homeschooling in South Africa
- South African Schools Act, 1996
