= Albert Hertzog =

South African politician, founder of Herstigte Nasionale Party

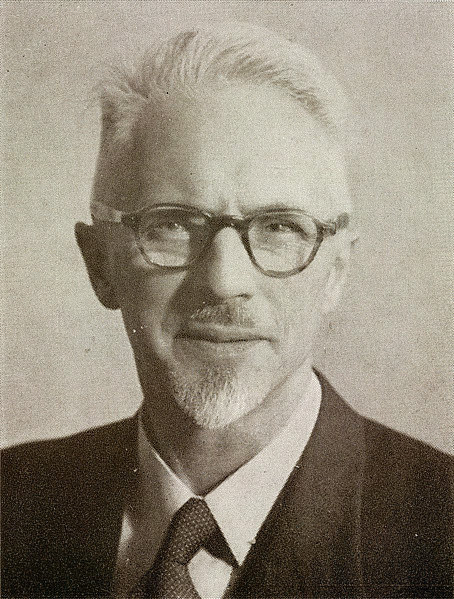

Leader of the Herstigte Nasionale Party
- In office 25 October 1969 – 28 May 1977
- Preceded by: New office
- Succeeded by: Jaap Marais

Minister of Health
- In office 24 August 1954 – 24 August 1958
- Governor General: Ernest George Jansen
- Prime Minister: Hendrik Verwoerd
- Preceded by: Michiel Daniel Christiaan de Wet Nel
- Succeeded by: Carel de Wet

Minister of Communications, Telecommunications and Postal Services.
- In office 23 October 1958 – 7 February 1968
- President: Charles Robberts Swart; Tom Naudé (acting)
- Governor General: Charles Robberts Swart
- Prime Minister: Hendrik Verwoerd; B.J. Vorster
- Preceded by: Jan Serfontein
- Succeeded by: Janse van Rensburg, M.C.C.

Personal details
- Born: 4 July 1899 Bloemfontein, Republic of the Orange Free State
- Died: 5 November 1982 (aged 83) Pretoria, Transvaal, South Africa
- Party: National Party (until 1969); Herstigte Nasionale Party (1969–1978)
- Spouse(s): Katie (née Whitely)†; Martie Viljoen(née Duvenage)
- Education: Stellenbosch University; B.A. (cum laude); University of Amsterdam; Oxford University; LL.B. Leiden University; LL.D.
- Profession: Barrister; Cabinet Minister; Politician

Johannes Albertus Munnik Hertzog (Afrikaans pronunciation: [ˈalbərt ˈɦærtsɔχ]; 4 July 1899 – 5 November 1982) was a South African politician, Afrikaner nationalist, cabinet minister, and founding leader of the Herstigte Nasionale Party. He was the son of J. B. M. (Barry) Hertzog, a former Prime Minister of the Union of South Africa.

Albert Hertzog served as the South African Minister of Health from 1954 to 1958 and as Minister of Post and Telecommunications from 1958 to 1968. As the latter, Hertzog was famous for his refusal to implement television in South Africa. In 1969, after being purged from the National Party for his reactionary and exclusive Afrikaner Nationalist views, Hertzog founded the Herstigte Nasionale Party ("Reconstituted National Party"). The HNP was opposed to what it viewed as the National Party's deviation from its founding principles under Hendrik Verwoerd's successor, John Vorster.

== Early life ==
The son of famed Boer general and later South African Prime Minister Barry Hertzog and his wife Mynie (born Neethling), Albert Hertzog was born on 4 July 1899 in his parental home, 19 Goddard Street, Bloemfontein. He was baptized on 31 August 1899 in the Moederkerk. Albert had two younger brothers, Charles Dirk Neethling (born in 1904) and James Barry Munnik (born 1905).

Hertzog was only three months old when the Second Boer War broke out. Initially he stayed with his mother at their home in Bloemfontein, but after four months moved in with her sister in the hamlet of Jagersfontein. After the town was taken by British troops, and their house blown up by dynamite, the family was herded onto cattle trucks and taken to the concentration camp at Port Elizabeth. The Hertzog inmates in the camp included baby Albert, his mother Mynie, his paternal grandmother and a number of Albert's aunts and cousins. They lived in a thin shack of eight square meters. Albert's seven-year-old cousin, Charles, died of measles only twelve days after arrival. Albert himself nearly succumbed to the disease, and was sent to relatives in Stellenbosch for care and treatment. He stayed in Stellenbosch in the house of his paternal grandfather, Charl Neethling, until the end of the war. Mynie Neethling was visited by Lord Kitchener personally in the Port Elizabeth camp, where he offered her dismissal should she try and persuade her husband to lay down his arms. She refused, and was subsequently sent via ship to the Merebank camp at Durban. Merebank was notorious as one of the camps with the highest fatality rates. After her internment, Mynie Hertzog was prone to illness for the rest of her life.

As toddler, Albert attended an English Catholic pre-primary school, where he heard and learnt his first English. That move seemed baffling to some, because the Calvinist and Boer patriot General Hertzog was a staunch proponent of Afrikaans language rights, especially in education. In 1910, after the birth of the Union of South Africa, General Hertzog was appointed in a dual portfolio as Minister of Justice and Minister of Native Affairs. The family therefore moved to Pretoria, and occupied a house west of the Union Buildings. His father sent Albert to the Arcadia Skool, but Albert was disappointed that it had a headmistress and, though in the city, was no different to a farm school. Although only eleven years old, he left on the afternoon of his first day, and enrolled at Pretoria Boys High School. After the schism between General Hertzog and Prime Minister Louis Botha, which led to Hertzog's dismissal from the cabinet, the family moved back to Bloemfontein, where Albert attended Grey College. He matriculated in 1916, having studied Dutch, English, Latin, Mathematics, and Physical Science.

== Education ==
After finishing his secondary education, Hertzog enrolled at the University of Stellenbosch in 1917. On 1 April 1920, he was awarded a BA cum laude, having studied Dutch, Latin, English, Greek, Chemistry and Mathematics in 1917, Political Science, Psychology and Latin in 1918, and Ethics, Logic and Political Economy in 1919. Hertzog then left for Europe on 6 August 1920, where he entered the University of Amsterdam. Two years later, he enrolled at New College, Oxford, to further read law. After finishing his studies at Oxford, Hertzog went to the University of Leiden in 1928, where he obtained the LL.D. degree in 1929. After leaving Oxford, he stayed with a Parisian family for a few weeks to improve his French.

== Political life ==
=== Early years ===
After returning to South Africa in 1929, Hertzog settled in Pretoria where he set up a practice as a barrister. At the same time, he was also a part-time lecturer at the University of Pretoria.

Hertzog was a supporter of Nazi Germany who sympathized with Nazi collaborator Robey Leibbrandt. He approved of Leibbrandt's "good work".

=== Member of Parliament (1948–1958) ===
In the election of 1948, at which the National Party under leadership of Dr. Danie Malan came to power, Hertzog was elected member of parliament for Ermelo in the Eastern Transvaal. He served as member of the House of Assembly under the tenure of Prime Ministers Malan and Hannes Strijdom.

=== Cabinet Minister (1958–1968) ===
When Dr. Hendrik Verwoerd was elected Prime Minister in 1958, he appointed Hertzog as a cabinet minister with the dual portfolios of Posts and Telegrams and Health. He was sworn in on 23 October 1958. During his time as minister of Posts and Telegrams, he disallowed the introduction of television in South Africa, calling it a "small bioscope".

=== Turmoil in the National Party ===
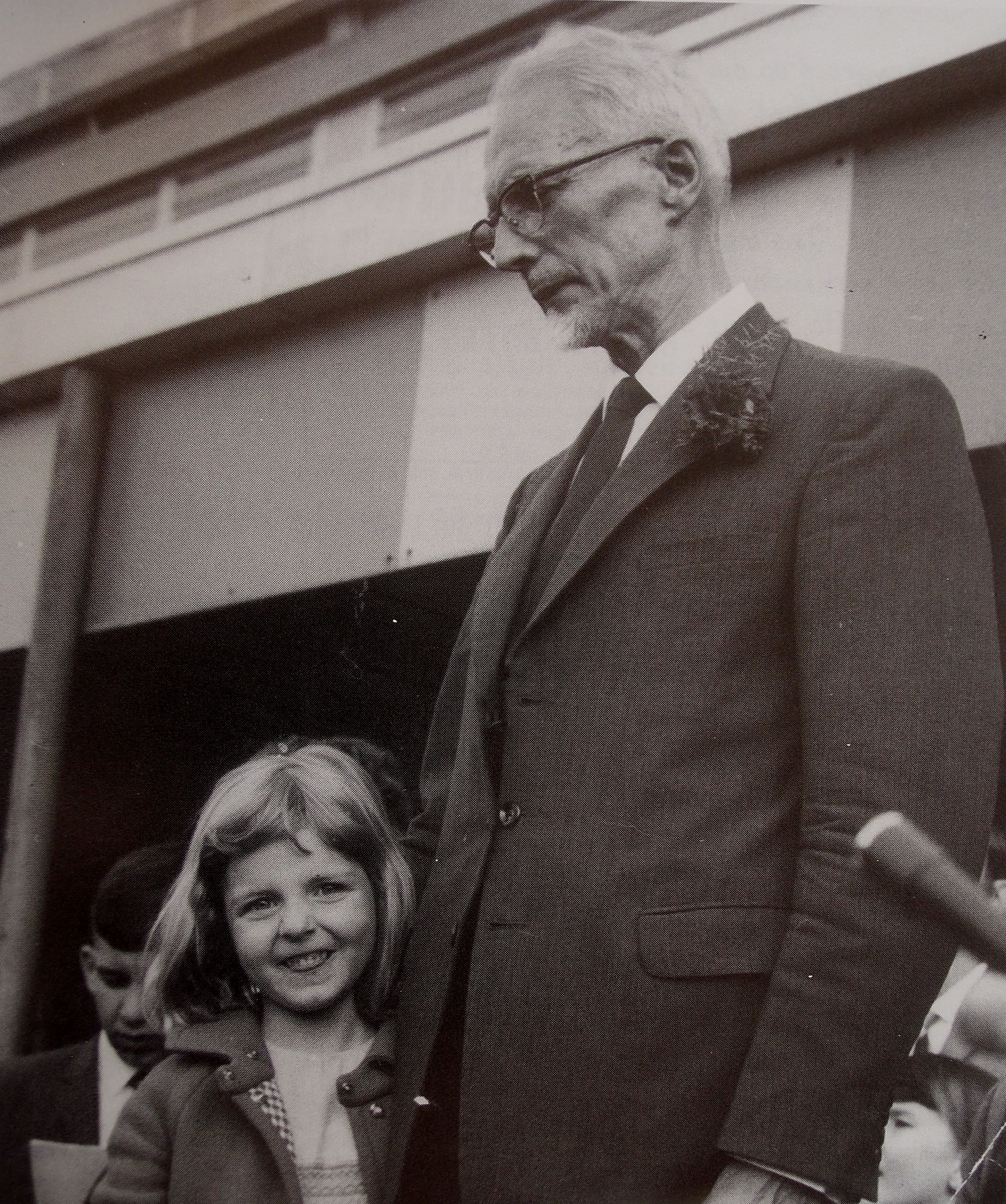
Dr. Albert Hertzog outside the hall where, moments before, on the evening of 4 October 1969, he had been kicked out of the National Party.

The terms verlig ("enlightened") and verkramp ("cramped") entered the Afrikaans (and later English) vernacular during the late 1960s. They were first used in a speech by prof. Willem de Klerk (son of Jan de Klerk and brother of future State President of South Africa, F.W. de Klerk) on 6 October 1966, exactly a month after the assassination of Dr. Hendrik Verwoerd. In his speech, De Klerk distinguished between verligte, verkrampte, and positiewe ("positive") Afrikaners. That threefold division would soon be simplified in the colloquial language to a simpler dichotomy between simply verlig and verkramp. What De Klerk called "positive Afrikaners" would then refer to what generally became known as verligte Afrikaners. He described positive Afrikaners (verligtes, thus) as "purpose conscious Afrikaners". "And purpose means to recognize the enduring and the changing. The closedness and the openness. The tradition and the progression... The purpose conscious Afrikaner recognizes and appreciates the tradition, and yet he is the man of today and with a vision on tomorrow, until eternity. The Afrikaner heritage is the Afrikaner-Christendom with the Calvinistic bedrock which recognizes the authority of the Bible as revelation and guide. But also he is open to further study of Scripture and he seeks the new roads to expand his religious heritage. At the same time the Afrikaner culture is young and virile, and is still busy to form itself on many levels, without having to cut ties with the past. The Book teaches clearly that exaggerated nationalism (idolatry of the People) as well as cosmopolitism contrast with the stipulations of God. Just as ungodly is the nationalized religion, which is the same as idolatry of the People."

De Klerk labeled the verkrampte Afrikaner as follows: "His fundamental axiom is: adherence to the extant, to the old ideas and customs and content is the test for being Afrikaner. He wants to lead us to rigidity; wants to exclude us from a new world; is a negativist. Also, he is ruled by the need to criticize. He is creative in his ability to sow distrust; hardened in the handling of one-sided slogans to generate witch hunts everywhere; accomplished in the technique of quibbling. He is without consideration and mercy, unwilling to converse, fanatic and extremist to enforce his opinion on a matter. He wants to forcefully push our youth into one-sidedness; haughty, stubborn self-preservation."

The verlig-verkramp-strife came to the fore after the assassination of Hendrik Verwoerd. Differences that had existed for a number of years began to manifest publicly, especially in the early days of new premier John Vorster's term.

=== Leader of the Herstigte Nasionale Party (1969–1977) ===
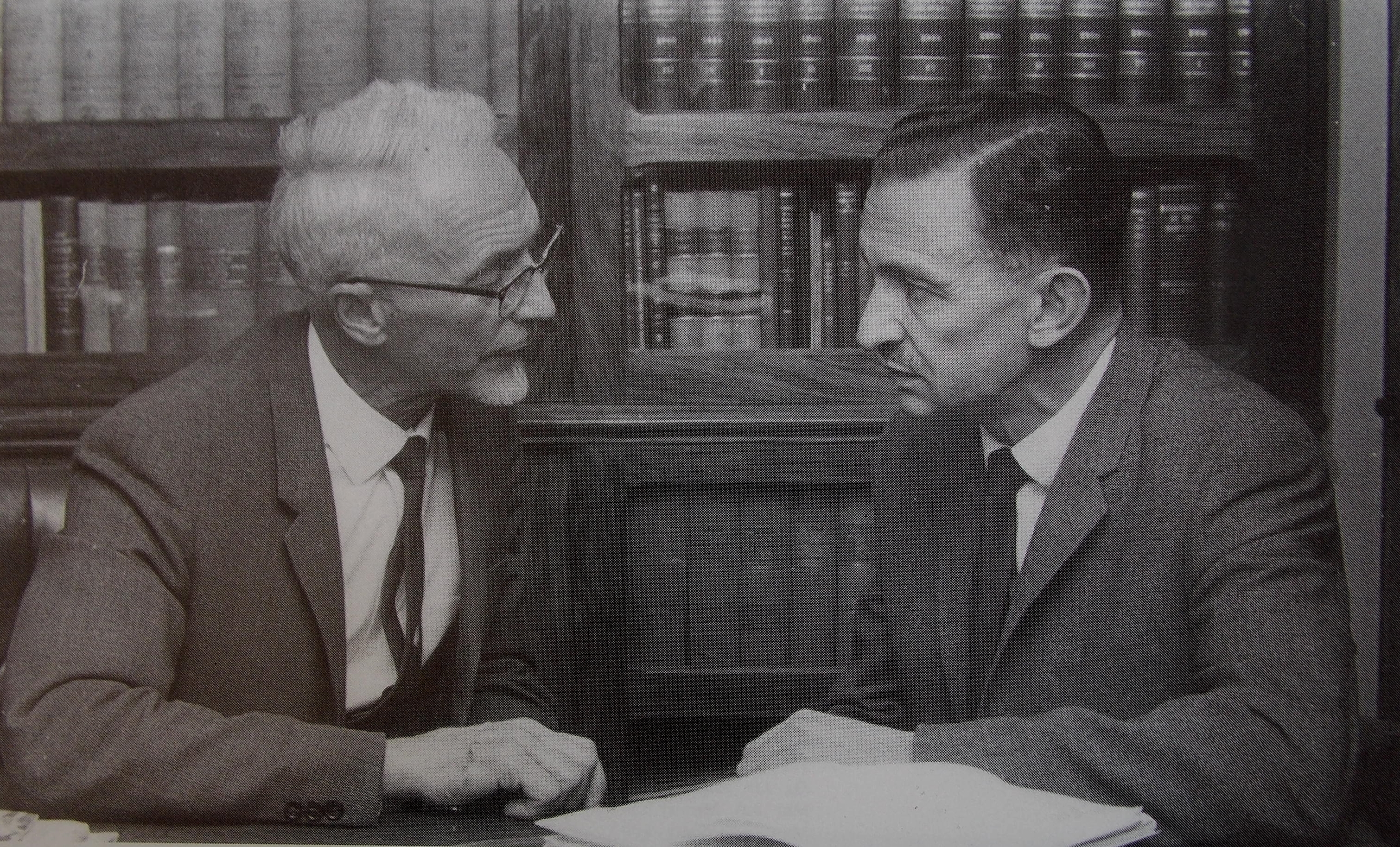
Dr. Albert Hertzog, leader of the HNP, and his deputy Jaap Marais, after a press conference in 1969 where Marais disclosed lies by the ruling National Party.

After he was ousted from the National Party, he formed and led a new party called, the Herstigte Nasionale Party on 24 October 1969.

Election results of the HNP in the House of Assembly under Dr. Albert Hertzog's leadership
Election year	# of total votes	% of overall vote	# of seats won	Rank
1970	53 763 ▲	3.57% ▲	0	3/4 ▲
1974	39 568▼	3.6% ▲	0	4/5 ▼

=== Retirement ===
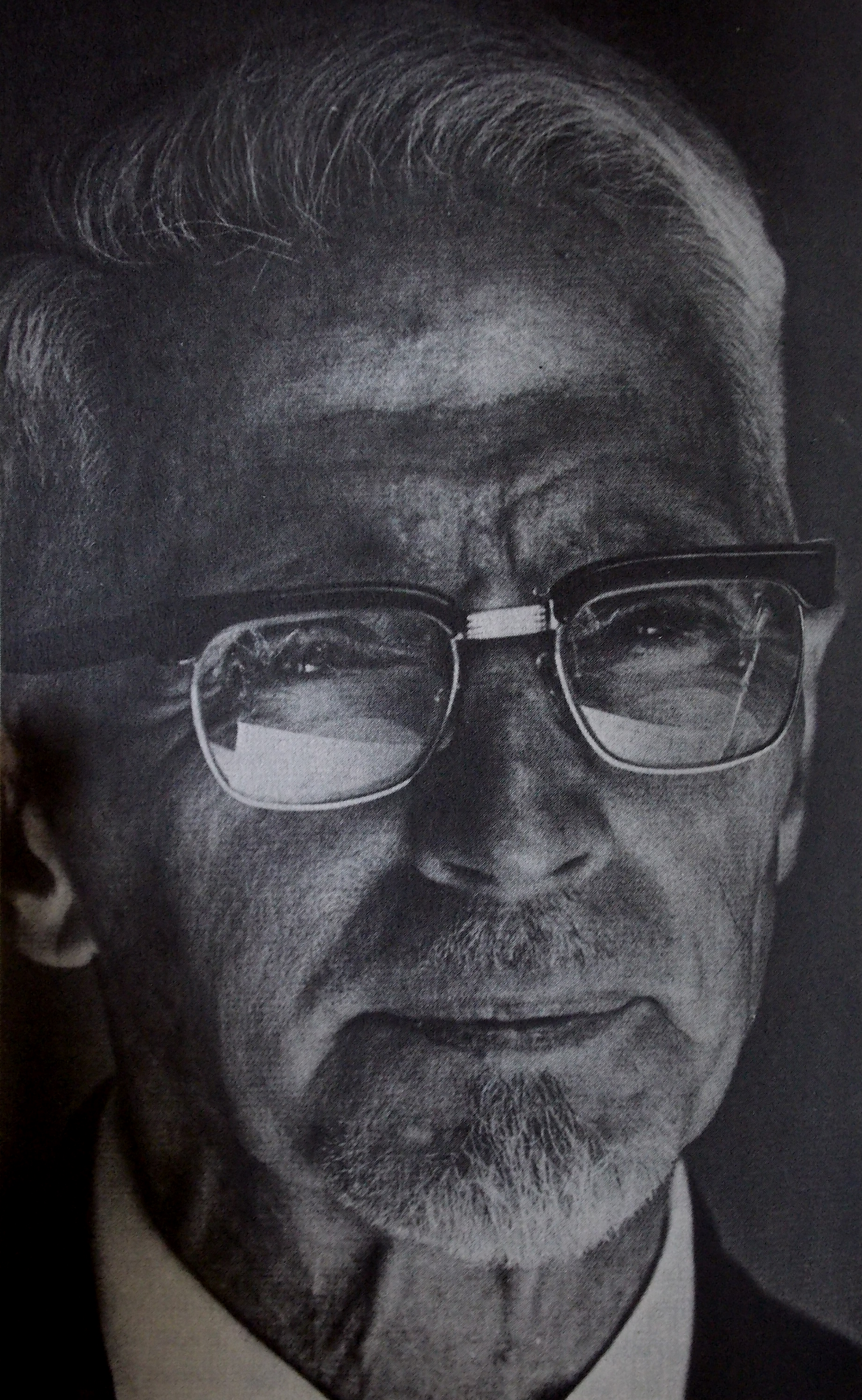
Hertzog in 1978 during his retirement

Hertzog decided to retire as leader of the HNP in 1977, and gave his farewell address on 27 May of that year. He officially retired on 28 May 1977, and was followed by Jaap Marais as party leader. During his retirement, Hertzog could devote more time to his numerous business endeavours and his hobby of gardening. In a press interview in 1979 he opined as follows: "In my view our political landscape is developing in the direction of a large, new conservative party which will consist of different people who are still currently trying to tread their own path. It can be a party consisting of the Treurnicht people in the NP, the Connie Mulder people, the HNP and definitely also conservative English speakers". This proved to be prophetic, as in 1982 a massive split occurred within the ruling National Party, and the Conservative Party came into being, with Andries Treurnicht as leader.

== Death, funeral and legacy ==
Hertzog died on 5 November 1982 during an emergency operation for a burst aorta. His funeral was held on 11 November 1982, in the NG Kerk in Waterkloof, and the service led by prof. Adriaan Pont. He was then laid to rest in the family cemetery on the farm Waterval, in the district of Witbank, next to his wife Katie, and close to his parents.

== Private life ==
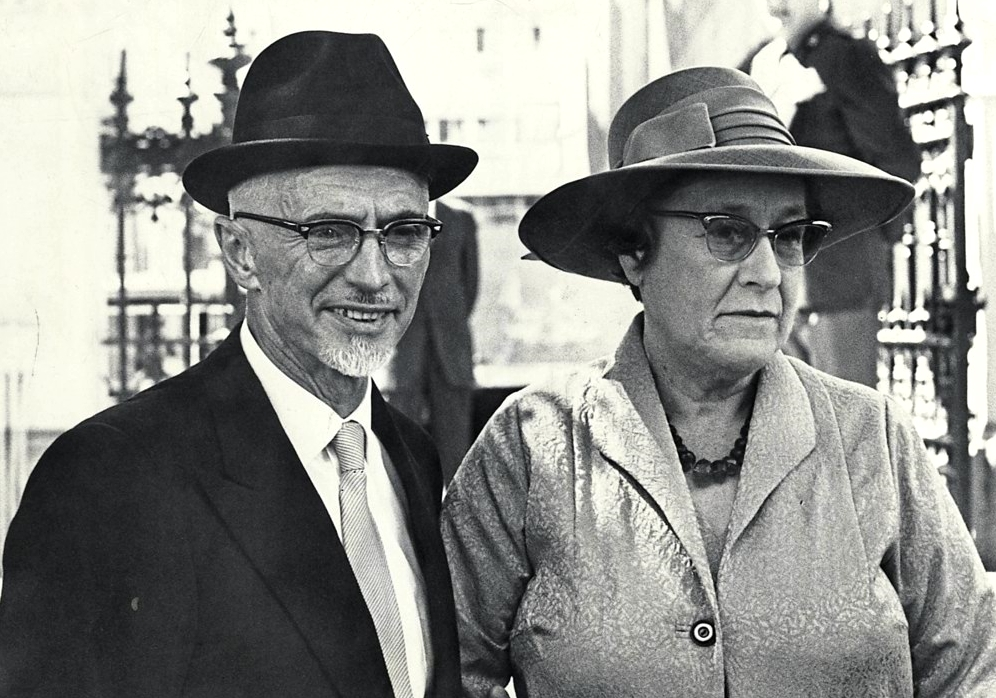
Dr. Albert Hertzog and his wife, Katie, in the 1960s.

Hertzog met Katherine Marjorie Whiteley, a South African born English girl in Oxford in 1926. They became engaged in 1927 and were married on 22 July 1933 in NG Kerk in Irene. Under Hertzog's tutorage, Katie, as she was known, became fluent in Afrikaans, and spoke it without any trace of an accent. Katie died of heart failure on 25 February 1970. The marriage of 37 years did not produce any children. Hertzog met the widow Martha Maria ("Martie") Viljoen (born Duvenage) in 1973, and married her in October 1977. She survived him when he died in 1982.

Even into his seventies, Hertzog kept a strict exercise regimen. He used no alcohol, and while he entertained visitors to his office on coffee or tea, he himself only drank whey, which he carried in a flask. Even among political opponents he was known for his polite manners and gentlemanly posture. Hertzog's house in Waterkloof was referred to as "An Alladin's cave of historic memories" by the Pretoria News. Mentioned in the article were an antique coper canon, a Dutch Statenbijbel dating from 1748, a medicine cabinet dating from the era of Jan van Riebeeck, and oak dating from an 18th-century ship. Hertzog collected, aloes, succulents and rare cycads, some of which were over a thousand years old. He served as the Honorary President of the South African Aloe and Succulent Society for a number of years, until he resigned in 1972.

== Political views ==
He has been described as a nationalist Afrikaner and an "ultra-conservative". Hertzog referred to television as “the evil box" because he regarded the new media as a negative influence on society throughout the world.

== Ancestry ==
Ancestors of Albert Hertzog

16. Johannes Mattheus Hertzog (1737–1812); a1b1
8. Dirk Wilhelm Hertzog (1789–1850); a1b1c5
17. Susanna Verwey (1756–1828); a1b3c3d2e2
4. Johannes Albertus Munnik Hertzog (1826–1921); a1b1c5d4
18. Johannes (Jan) Albertus Munnik(1768–1854); a1b1c3d3
9. Christina Munnik (1796–1836); a1b1c3d3e4
19. Sara Christina Dreyer (1768–1850); a1b3c3
2. James Barry Munnik Hertzog (1866–1942); a1b1c5d4e8
20. Johannes Nicolaas Hamman (1762–1839); a2b10
10. Pieter Eduard Hamman (1799–1874); a2b10c6
21. Susanna Maria Hauman (1780–1852); a1b1c3
5. Susanna Maria Jacoba Hamman (1831–1895); a2b10c6d4
22. Christiaan Gobrechts (1761–?); a1b1c6
11. Wilhelmina Gobrechts (1804–?); a1b1c6d9
23. Jacomina Hendrina Smit (1766–?); b3c11d9
1. Johannes Albertus Munnik Hertzog (1899–1982); a1b1c5d4e8f1
24. Marthinus Laurentius Neethling (1773–1855); a1b6
12. Johannes (Jan) Henoch Neethling (1800–1871); a1b6c8
25. Anna Tobia de Villiers (1772–1828); a1b5c2d4
6. Charles Marais Neethling (1827–1916); a1b6c8d3
26. Johannes (Stephanus) Marais (1763–1801); a1b2c4d4
13. Anna Margaretha Marais (1800–?); a1b2c4d4e7f6
27. Anna Helena Joubert (1763–1793); a1b8c1d10
3. Wilhelmina Jacoba Neethling (1863–1942); a1b6c8d3e6
28. Arend de Waal (1775–1861); a1b2c7
14. Pieter de Waal (1798–1870); a1b2c7d1
29. Maria Margaretha Bosman (1777–1866); a1b10c12
7. Wilhelmina Jacoba de Waal (1833–1905); b2c7d1e2
30. Daniël Louw (1780–1861); a1b5c1d1e1f2
15. Susanna Gertruida Louw (1808–1890); a1b5c1d1e1f2g4
31. Susanna Geertruida de Villiers (1786–1861); a1b12c5d10

== Publications ==
=== Books ===
- Die Calvinistiese toespraak van dr. A. Hertzog, L.V., Pretoria: Herstigte Nasionale Party, 1970.
- Waarheen Suid-Afrika?: Oproep tot die stryd, Pretoria: M.M. Hertzog, 1985, ISBN 0-620-07794-8.
