= Dirk Hermann =

South African labour executive (born 1972)

- Born: Dirk Johannes Hermann; 13 January 1972; South Africa
- Education: Heilbron Combined School, North-West University
- Occupations: Trade unionist, author

Dirk Johannes Hermann (born 13 January 1972) is a South African labour executive. He is chief executive officer of Solidarity, an Afrikaans union. He has authored four books.

== Personal life ==
Hermann is the son of Marthinus Nicolaas Hermann and Moira Crafford. He is a descendant of the 1820 British settler James Herman. Later descendants added a second "n" to the surname. He married Elsha Cornelia Coetzer, with whom he has four daughters.

He studied at North-West University, where he earned a BA in law, a BA in labour relations, a Master in industrial sociology, and published his PhD dissertation on affirmative action in 2006.

== Career ==
Hermann has been a trustee for Tabok trust, he was a director at Akademia, and vice-president of the convocation of North-West University. He is chief executive officer for the Solidarity trade union.

== Publications ==
- The Naked Emperor: Why Affirmative Action Has Failed
- Affirmative Tears: Why Representivity Does Not Equal Equality
- Basta! Ons voetspore is in Afrika
- Land of Sorrow: 20 Years of Farm Attacks in South Africa
