= Solidarity (South African trade union) =

- Solidarity
- Solidariteit/Solidarity
- Founded: 22 June 1902
- Headquarters: Pretoria, South Africa
- Location: South Africa
- Members: 202,283 (2024)
- Key people: Flip Buys (Chairperson); Dirk Hermann (Chief Executive); Steve Scott (president)
- Affiliations: ITUC
- Website: solidariteit.co.za/en

Solidarity (Afrikaans: Solidariteit) is a South African trade union that represents Afrikaner workers's interests. It is also a trade union within the Christian tradition of unionism. It is an affiliate of AfriForum.

== History ==
Its origins go back to 1902, when the Transvaal Miners' Association was founded in the mines on the Witwatersrand. In 1913, it became the Mine Workers' Union, and it later became the largest affiliate of the South African Confederation of Labour (SACOL), which supported the apartheid system.

In its earliest iteration, the TMA took militant stances in a series of “great industrial strikes” and, as the renamed Mine Worker’s Union, in 1922 was a major player in the “Rand Revolt,” in which it fought for preservation of jobs for white South Africans at the expense of black workers in South Africa’s gold mines.

It left SACOL in 1992 to reinvent itself as a general union, MWU - Solidarity.

In 1997, when the union's current general secretary, Flip Buys, was appointed, the union was in dire financial straits. The extreme right-wing views associated with the union had led to a dramatic decline in popularity and membership: it had only about 30,000 members left at that stage. In 2001, it absorbed the South African Workers' Union, the Denelunie, the Karweiersunie and the Bosbou- en Plantasiebestuursunie, and renamed itself as Solidarity. Since the beginning of Flip Buys' term, the membership had increased to more than 130,000 by 2009. The union has more than 17 offices throughout the country and a staff complement of about 300 members.

Solidarity affiliated with the Confederation of South African Workers' Unions (CONSAWU) in 2006, but left again in 2011. Through this affiliation Solidarity is represented at the International Trade Union Confederation (ITUC).

Initially a multi-ethnic – though exclusively white – union, the role it and its predominantly Afrikaner constituency has played as a civil society organisation has shifted over the course of the last century, a product of both economic and political tides that have washed the country.

== Litigation ==
In 2013, Solidarity sued the Department of Correctional Services on behalf of one white and four coloured Correctional Services officials in the Western Cape who alleged they were denied promotions due to the department's employment equity policy. Another five applicants were later added to the case.

The ANC in the Western Cape called the suit an "attack on employment equity", and accused the applicants of "stirring up racial antagonism between Africans and coloureds".

== Additional operations ==
The "Solidarity Movement" originated from the trade union and includes several organisations.

=== Solidarity Helping Hand ===
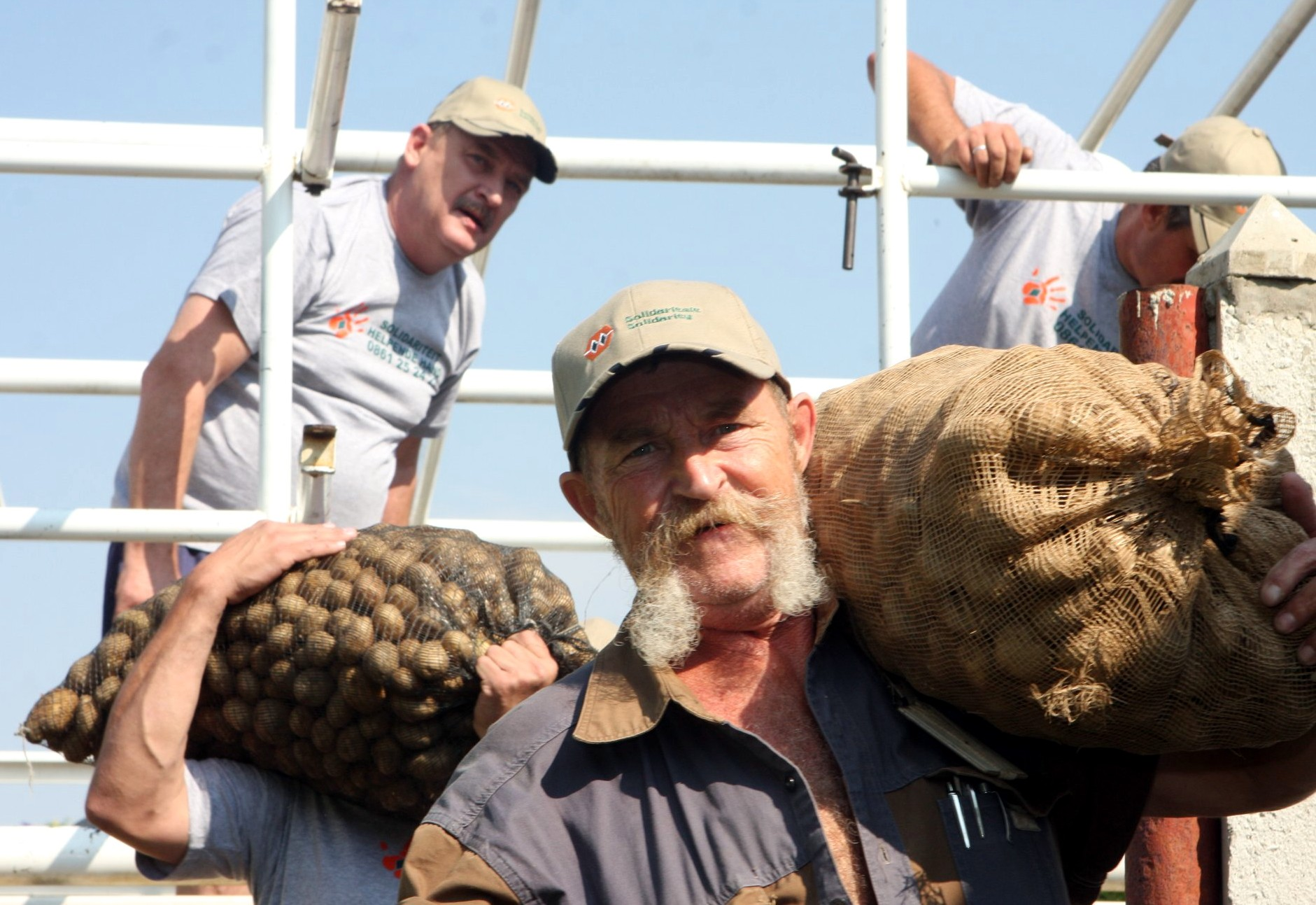
A Helping Hand volunteer unloads donated food in Welkom.

The Solidarity Helping Hand is a social responsibility organisation that, though started by Solidarity, is an independent entity that functions on its own, separate from the union. It does however receive financial support from the union's members. It is registered as a Section 21 company (not-for-profit). It focuses specifically on supporting communities that have limited access to state support. The two areas where the Helping Hand operates intensively is Pretoria and environs and in Cape Town. Nevertheless, the Helping Hand actively expands into many other areas. As of June 2010, there were 32 other smaller regional branches throughout the country. The Helping Hand focuses on assisting destitute Afrikaans-speaking people, but not to the exclusion of individuals from other cultural groups.

=== AfriForum ===
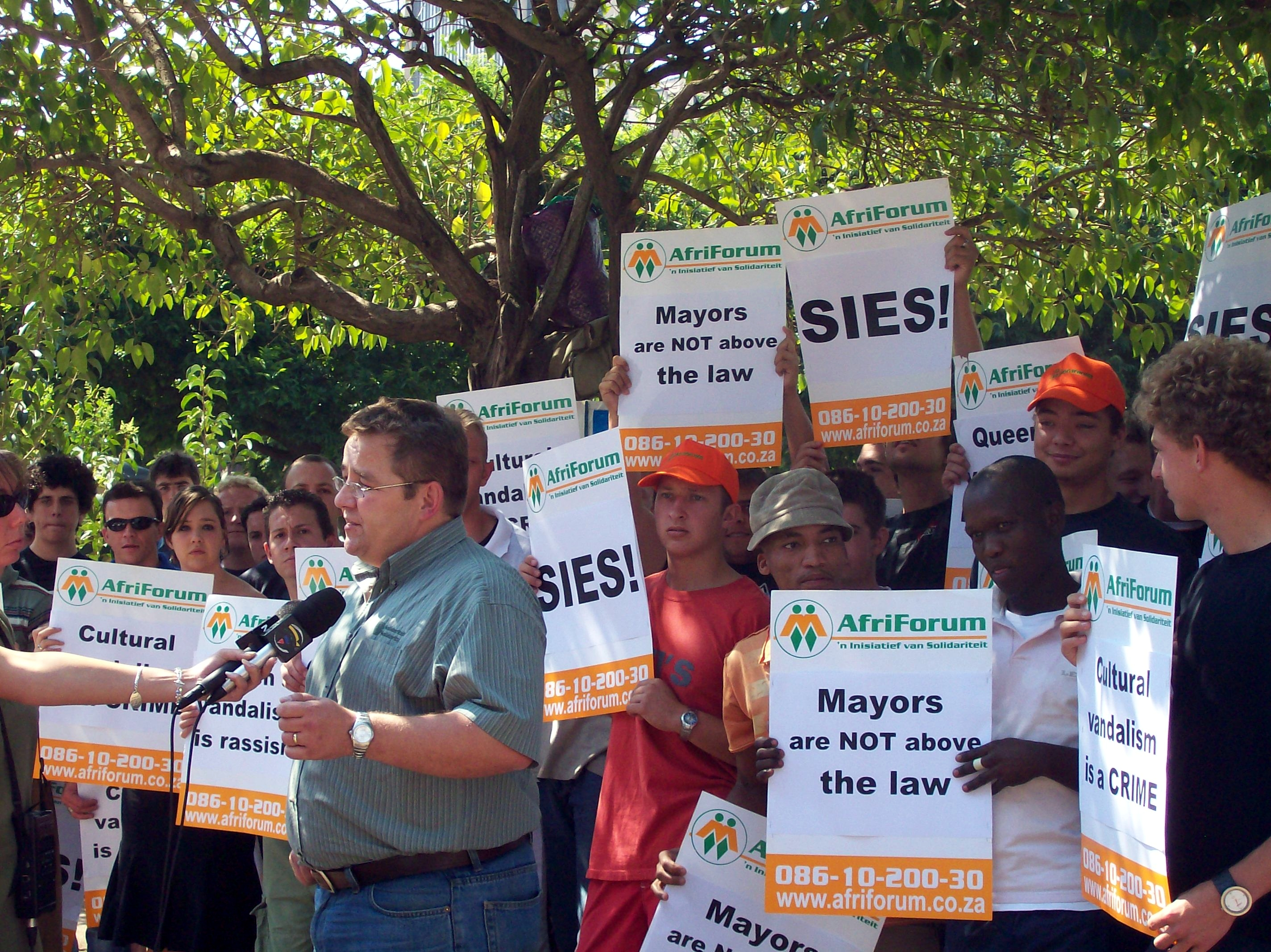
An AfriForum protest in Pretoria against the destruction of a Great Trek monument in Standerton.

AfriForum, an independent initiative of Solidarity, is an organisation in South Africa linked to the Solidarity trade union. It was established in 2006 to encourage the re-engagement of the Afrikaners and other minorities in the public sphere. It promotes the protection of Afrikaner culture, and has opposed renaming streets and affirmative action. AfriForum has attracted significant controversy because of its views, especially denial that Apartheid was a crime against humanity, albeit nonetheless immoral.

According to AfriForum CEO, Kallie Kriel, AfriForum is a civil rights initiative to mobilise civil society and specifically minority communities, in order to take part in democratic debate. Kriel further stated that AfriForum would like to achieve balance in South Africa. "True democracy needs alternative voices in order to succeed. While we aren’t a political party, we give alternative ideas and suggestions, where applicable, to the government stance". AfriForum's claim to be a civil rights organisation has been questioned in the South African media, and South African and international media often characterise Afriforum as a white nationalist or white supremacist group.

=== Sol-Tech ===
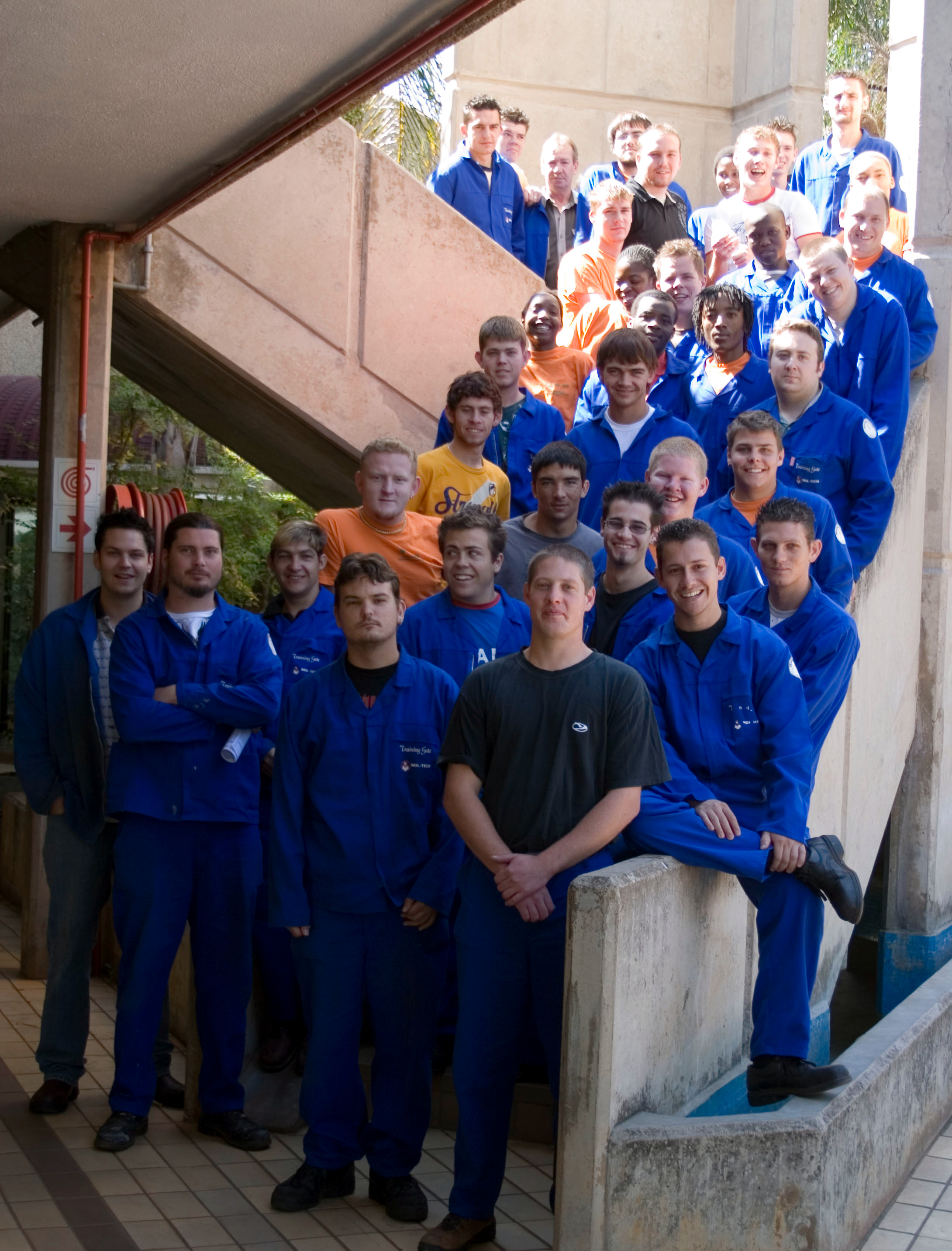
Some of Sol-Tech's students at the old campus in Centurion, Gauteng

In 2007 Solidarity started an Afrikaans technical college in Centurion with 3 lecturers and 64 students. According to them this was in response to the ANC government's allegedly racist policies which allegedly discriminates against White Afrikaners and their Afrikaans language, and in their eyes to enable Afrikaner youth to have a future in South Africa with the right skills.

Reception was mixed with ANC politician Panyaza Lesufi calling it a symbol of Solidariteit's "hatred of a democratic South Africa" and an "insult to the overwhelming majority of our people". While the newspaper The Sowetan said that "the establishment an Afrikaans-medium college should be applauded as an example of a proactive community intervention to address a social need rather than wait for the government to provide".

SolTech college offers young people training in technical areas like vehicle mechanics, electronics, fitting and turning. The college claims that 94.7% of their students get employment offers after their studies.

On 1 February 2021, the college opened their new R300 million campus for 3000 students in Pretoria.

== General Secretaries ==
1902: W. Mather
1903: S. W. Fursey
1904: J. Wood
1907: M. Trewick
1908: Tom Matthews
1915: James Forrester-Brown
1921: Percy Fisher
1922: J. Cowan
1922: E. S. Hendriksz
1923: W. Price
1925: M. Dunne
1926: J. C. Medo
1929: H. Day
1930: M. J. du Plessis
1931: ?
1933: Piet Harms
1935: Charles Harris
1940: Fred Kukkuk
1941: Bertie Brodrick
1948: Daan Ellis
1963: Eddie Gründling
1967: Arrie Paulus
1987: Peet Ungerer
1997: Flip Buys
