= Accord on Afrikaner self-determination =

South African political accord

- Ratified: 23 April 1994
- Location: Pretoria, South Africa
- Signatories: Freedom Front; African National Congress; South African government/National Party
- Subject: Recognition of the right on self-determination by the South African government and the African National Congress
- Purpose: Creation of common ground for future negotiations about Afrikaner self-determination Ensuring of the participation of the Freedom Front in the 1994 general elections

The Accord on Afrikaner self-determination is a South African political accord that recognises the right of the Afrikaner people on self-determination. The accord was signed by the Freedom Front, the African National Congress and the National Party-led South African government on 23 April 1994.

== Background ==
During the negotiations between the South African (apartheid) government and the African National Congress to create a new democratic South Africa there was a lot of resistance among conservative Afrikaners. Their main political party – the Conservative Party – did not want the Afrikaners to lose political power in South Africa. In 1992 the South African government decided to call an end-of-apartheid referendum with the question whether the negotiations with the ANC and other parties for a new constitution should continue. During the campaign the National Party-led government swore that it would never accept a proportional electoral system, because this would mean that white minority (12% of the population) should lose all power to the black majority (74% of the population). The NP would only accept a form of power sharing. Ultimately, 68.7% of the white voters voted in favour for the continuation of the negotiations.

In the last months of 1992 the NP-led government, the ANC and other important groups came to an accord to develop a new constitution. The parties agreed on 32 constitutional principals. These constitutional principals set out a proportional electoral system based on the principle of One man, one vote, instead of power sharing between different cultural groups in South Africa. Conservative Afrikaners were very dissatisfied with the outcomes of the negotiations. At 25 June 1993 – during the second round of negotiations for the interim constitution of 1993 – around 3,000 supporters of the Afrikaner Weerstandsbeweging stormed into the World Trade Centre in Johannesburg to disrupt the negotiations.

In late 1993 the African National Congress and the newly established Afrikaner Volksfront – which was an umbrella organisation of several right-wing Afrikaner organisations – negotiated about a bantustan (also called volkstaat) for Afrikaners around Pretoria. The ANC agreed to negotiate because they were concerned that conservatives in the (white) South African Defence Force would commit a coup d'état to maintain white rule in South Africa. Although the ANC and the Afrikaner Volksfront came to an agreement, the far-right in the Afrikaner Volksfront refused to sign the agreement and rejected the interim constitution of South Africa which was passed in November 1993.

As a result, the far-right in the Afrikaner Volksfront forced the Afrikaner Volksfront to boycott the general elections at 27 April 1994. On 26 February 1994 this led to a rupture in the Afrikaner Volksfront, that consisted of an alliance between hardliners that did not want general (multi-racial) elections and moderates that wanted to establish a volkstaat before a general election was held. The moderate Volkstaters, led by General Constand Viljoen, left the Afrikaner Volksfront and established their own party: the Freedom Front.

At the same time about one million Afrikaners refused to accept a new state structure in which Afrikaners would lose their political power. This could lead to permanent public unrest after the elections. Especially in the last weeks before the general election, the ANC was afraid of a coup by conservative Afrikaners. At that time, the National Party refused to sign the final agreements with the ANC, because there was no agreement on amnesty for the members of the state security services of the Apartheid government. Therefore, the ANC continued to negotiate with conservative Afrikaners about a homeland or volkstaat for Afrikaners. After the rupture of the Afrikaner Volksfront, the ANC continued these talks with the Freedom Front. The ANC, Freedom Front and the NP-led government of South Africa came to an agreement on 23 April 1994.

== Accord ==
The Accord on Afrikaner self-determination was signed on 23 April 1994 in Pretoria, four days before the first multiracial general elections of South Africa. The accord included eight agreements:

1. The idea of Afrikaner self-determination, including the idea of a Volkstaat, will be discussed through negotiations between the parties;
2. During the negotiations on Afrikaner self-determination, the possibilities of local and/or regional and other forms of Afrikaner self-determination will not be excluded;
3. The result of the negotiations shall be based on large support for Afrikaner self-determination and common principles as democracy, anti-racism, fundamental human rights and the promotion of peace and national reconciliation;
4. Support of Afrikaner self-determination will be measured by elections in an – by the parties indicated – area or specific polling stations;
5. A Volkstaat Council we be erected. This Volkstaat Council will research possible forms of Afrikaner self-determination. The Volkstaat Council will report to the South African government;
6. The Volkstaat Council will be free to form its own advisory bodies;
7. During the negotiations of Afrikaner self-determination the parties will also discuss among themselves and reach agreement about the perceived consequences of the outcome of the negotiations for the agricultural sector;
8. The parties further agree that they will discuss all matters of concerns by negotiations. The possibility of international mediation to help resolve such matters as may be in dispute and/or difficult to conclude will not be excluded.

With the accord the Freedom Front got its possibilities to address Afrikaner self-determination after the general election of 27 April 1994. The ANC ensured the participation of conservative Afrikaners in the same general election, avoiding a coup d'état by conservative Afrikaners and adding legitimacy to that general election.

=== Signatories ===
The signing of the Accord on Afrikaner self-determination took place at 23 April 1994 in Pretoria. The signing ceremony was supervised by witnesses prof. Abraham Viljoen and Jürgen Kögl. The following parties are signatories of the accord:

| Party/Signatory | Signature of | Position of signatory |
|---|---|---|
| Freedom Front | Constand Viljoen | Party leader |
| African National Congress | Thabo Mbeki | National president |
| South Africa / National Party | Roelf Meyer | Minister of Constitutional Development |

== Aftermath ==
The Accord on Afrikaner self-determination has been implemented in several founding documents of post-apartheid South Africa. Because of the rupture of the Afrikaner Volksfront and agenda-issues the Accord could not be signed earlier than 23 April 1994. By that time some of the results of the Accord already were signed into law.

=== Interim Constitution Amendment Act ===
At 25 January 1994 the Interim Constitution was signed into law by State President De Klerk. The Interim Constitution was to be implemented at 27 April 1994. On 2 March 1994, the proposed interim constitution was amended by the Constitution of the Republic of South Africa Amendment Act, 1994. This amendment created provisions for the creation of a Volkstaat Council. For this purpose a new chapter (11A) was inserted in the Interim Constitution. Following this chapter, the Volkstaat Council Act was signed into law on 2 December 1994 by president Nelson Mandela.

=== Constitutional Principles ===
The list with constitutional principles was also amended by the Amendment Act, by adding a new principle. The new Constitutional Principle XXXIV added a territorial component to the provisions on self-determination made in Constitutional Principle XII. The Accord on Afrikaner self-determination made territorial self-determination one of the 34 constitutional principles.

The 34 constitutional principles are the basis of any South African constitution, and before a new constitution or amendments of the constitution can take effect these texts must be reviewed according to the 34 constitutional principles by the Constitutional Court of South Africa.

Constitutional Principle XXXIV read:

1. This Schedule and the recognition therein of the right of the South African people as a whole to self-determination, shall not be construed as precluding, within the framework of the said right, constitutional provision for a notion of the right to self-determination by any community sharing a common cultural and language heritage, whether in a territorial entity within the Republic or in any other recognised way.

2. The Constitution may give expression to any particular form of self-determination provided there is substantial proven support within the community concerned for such a form of self-determination.

3. If a territorial entity referred to in paragraph 1 is established in terms of this Constitution before the new constitutional text is adopted, the new Constitution shall entrench the continuation of such territorial entity, including its structures, powers and functions.

— Constitutional Principle XXXIV, Interim Constitution of South Africa

According the Constitutional Court of South Africa, the first two subsections of the principle were mainly permissive provisions. Only the third subsection was a mandatory provision: if a territorial entity had been established before the new constitution was adopted, then this entity must be entrenched in the new constitution. No such entity had been established, so no obligatory entrenchment had to be made.

== Volkstaat Council ==
After the provincial elections of 1994 it was found that there was enough support for the erection of the Volkstaat Council, which task would be to map the possibilities of Afrikaner self-determination. During the elections 37% of the Afrikaners or 640,000 people voted for the Freedom Front. The Volkstaat Council existed of 20 members and was founded on 16 June 1994. The Volkstaat Council did research on the desirability of different forms of autonomy and self-determination under the population of certain areas, the demographic feasibility of these forms and possible forms of government of these areas.

Between 1994 and 1996 the Volkstaat Council also participated during the design of a new constitution and political order of South Africa. The Volkstaat Council sent different proposals to different commissions busy with the design of a new constitution.

On 31 March 1999 the Volkstaat Council sent its findings to the South African government. The Volkstaat Council submitted the next proposals:

| How | Where | Number of inhabitants (1998; without possible immigration) | Support | Possibility |
|---|---|---|---|---|
| Independent Volkstaat | North Western Cape corridor with Orania as starting point | ca. 70,000 Afrikaners | Support of the inhabitants of Orania and the approval of the South African government | Not a current situation, requires future development |
| Afrikaans-speaking region ("Belgian model") | Pretoria-Centurion-Magaliesberg | 389,656 Afrikaners (72,6%) and 138,920 non-Afrikaners (27,4%) | 76% of the living Afrikaners | Most feasible option, but non-negotiable for the ANC-led government |
| Cantons ("Swiss model") | Mpumalanga (with i.a. Witbank, Middelburg, Nelspruit) | ca. 200,000 Afrikaners | 80% of the living Afrikaners | |
| Afrikaner Councils | Non-territorial, complementary to each elected body | All Afrikaners | NA | The ANC-led government of South Africa rejects the idea of dual representation of Afrikaners in their own councils. |

A form of autonomy for the Bushveld in the western part of Limpopo (Northern Transvaal) was already perceived as unreachable by the Volkstaat Council itself.

The South African government did not react to the proposals of the Volkstaat Council. Per the government Afrikaners form only a minority in all municipalities. Some Afrikaners have accused the ruling African National Congress of gerrymandering to reset the municipal boundaries in 2000, so that many cities and towns with an Afrikaner-majority were merged into large(r) municipalities with larger concentrations of people with other cultures.

== Current situation ==
=== Article 235 ===
The new 1996 constitution of South Africa acknowledges the right of self-determination of separate cultural and linguistic groups:

The right of the South African people as a whole to self-determination, as manifested in this Constitution, does not preclude, within the framework of this right, recognition of the notion of the right of self-determination of any community sharing a common cultural and language heritage; within a territorial entity in the Republic or in any other way, determined by national legislation.

— Article 235, Constitution of South Africa

Before implemented, this article – and the whole new constitution – was reviewed by the Constitutional Court of South Africa. The Constitutional Court used the 34 constitutional principles as the basis for this review.

In March 2026, The Umkhonto we Sizwe (MK) Party has gazetted its intention to repeal Section 235 of the Constitution.

=== Moosa-declaration ===
On 5 June 1998 Valli Moosa, the then minister of Constitutional Development (ANC), said during a parliamentary debate that:

The pursuit on the part of the Freedom Front and other Afrikaners to strive towards the development of a particular region in the country (the North Western Cape corridor) as a home for Afrikaner culture and language within the framework of the constitution and Bill of Rights, is in government’s view indeed a legitimate pursuit.

— Valli Moosa (ANC), Minister of Constitutional Development, 1998, in parliament

=== Orania ===
During the rupture of the Afrikaner Volksfront the more moderate Volkstaters left the Afrikaner Volksfront and established the Freedom Front. The main founders of the Freedom Front were Constand Viljoen, Pieter Mulder and Carel Boshoff. Boshoff was also the leader of the Afrikaner town of Orania, although the town is not a signatory of the Accord on Afrikaner self-determination.

Since 2000 there have been negotiations between Orania and the South African and Northern Cape governments about the status of the village. No agreement has been reached and Orania is the only village outside of the municipal structure of South Africa, because it still has its own transitional representative council in place.

== See also ==
- Afrikaners
- Afrikaner nationalism
- Freedom Front Plus
- Orania, Northern Cape
- Volkstaat
