= Afrikaner Volksfront =

South African separatist organization

Afrikaner People's Front
- Afrikaner Volksfront
- The Vryheidsvlag (English: Freedom flag), registered in 1995 with the South African Bureau of Heraldry as the flag of the Afrikaner Volksfront
- Founders: Constand Viljoen, Tienie Groenewald, Koos Bischoff, and Cobus Visser
- Leaders: Constand Viljoen, Ferdi Hartzenberg, and Piet Botha
- President: Ferdi Hartzenberg
- Chief secretary: Piet Botha
- Dates active: 7 May 1993 – November 1996
- Groups: Boerestaat Party, Herstigte Nasionale Party, and Oranjewerkers
- Ideology: Anti-communism; Afrikaner nationalism Volkstaat
- Political position: Far-right
- Status: Defunct
- Wars: the transition to majority rule in South Africa

The Afrikaner Volksfront (AVF; English: Afrikaner People's Front) was a separatist umbrella organisation uniting a number of right-wing Afrikaners organisations in South Africa in the early and mid-1990s.

== History ==
The AVF was formed by General Constand Viljoen and three other generals from the South African Defence Force (SADF), and launched on 7 May 1993. The other three generals were Major General Tienie Groenewald, a former chief of military intelligence, Lieutenant General Koos Bischoff, former chief of operations of the SADF, and Lieutenant General Cobus Visser, a former head of investigations of the South African Police. The AVF President was Ferdi Hartzenberg, leader of the Conservative Party, and the chief secretary was Colonel Piet Botha.

The AVF existed as an umbrella group for right wing groups rather than a party in itself. Other groups involved included the Boerestaat Party, the Herstigte Nasionale Party, and the Oranjewerkers. The AVF aimed to disrupt the 1994 elections.

The AVF established a Volksrepubliek werkkomitee ("People's Republic working committee") to gather information and put the ideal of Afrikaner self-determination into practice. In September 1993 this committee recommended a Volkstaat solution incorporating Pretoria, parts of the Transvaal, and northern Kimberley and Northern Natal, which would exist as a state with the right to secede from a federal South Africa; in November 1994 a new proposal was suggested for a smaller state with just autonomy. The negotiations held with the ANC displeased hardliners within the AVF, with Hartzenberg demanding nothing less than an independent Afrikaner homeland. After negotiations failed Viljoen's position in the AVF was undermined by the hardliners; Viljoen left and subsequently formed the Freedom Front. The AVF rejected the interim constitution of South Africa which was passed in November 1993.

In 1994 the AVF sought to have the Boers recognised as an indigenous people by the United Nations but were unsuccessful after 82 other indigenous peoples signed a petition against the AVF's participation. The AVF also participated in the 1994 Bophuthatswana crisis in which several members of the Afrikaner Weerstandsbeweging were killed.

The AVF was disbanded in November 1996.
