= Verwoerd (surname) =

Verwoerd is a surname originating from the Netherlands. Notable people with the surname include:

- Betsie Verwoerd (1901–2000), spouse of the prime minister of South Africa from 1958 to 1966 as the wife of Hendrik
- Cornelis Verwoerd (1913–2000), Dutch Delftware painter, modeler, and ceramist
- Hendrik Verwoerd (1901–1966), prime minister of South Africa from 1958 to 1966
- Melanie Verwoerd (born 1967), South African politician and diplomat, ex-wife of Wilhelm
- Wilhelm Verwoerd (born 1964), South African political philosopher, grandson of Hendrik
