= Afrikaner Self-determination Party =

South African far-right political party

Afrikaner Self-determination Party Afrikaner Selfbeskikking Party
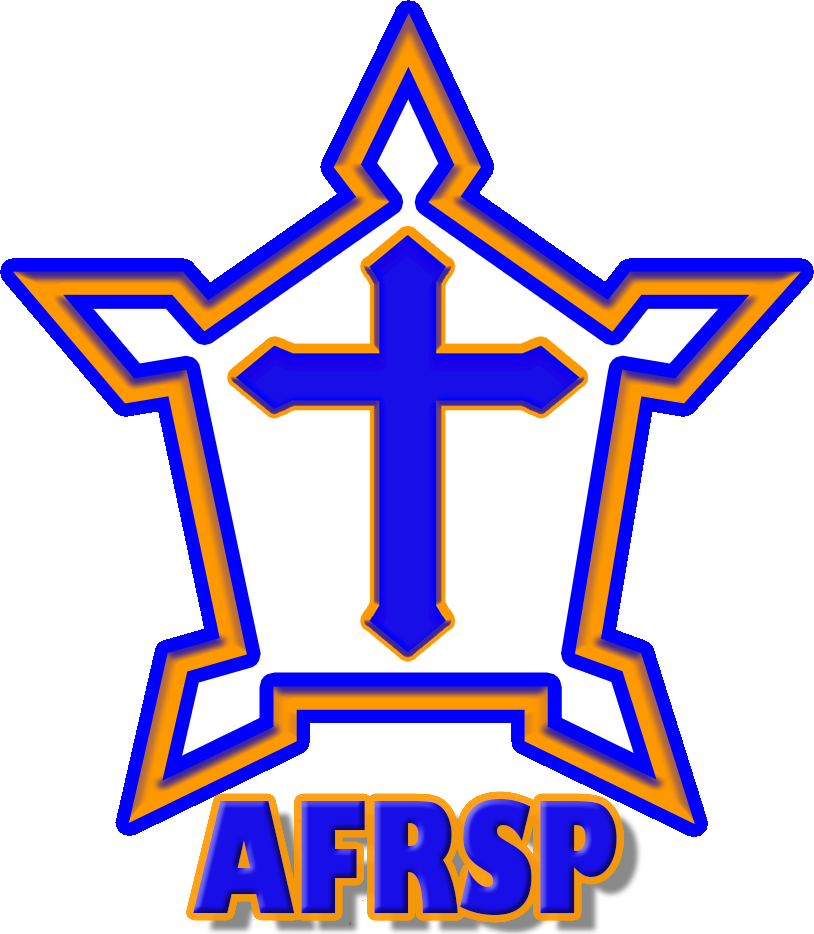
- Abbreviation: AFRSP
- Leader: Adv Jurg Prinsloo
- Chairperson: Charl Hertzog
- Secretary: Henry White
- Operational Head: Adv Jurg Prinsloo
- Deputy Leader: Adv Pieter Aucamp
- Chairman: Charl Hertzog
- Secretary and Treasurer: Peet Fouche
- Youth Leader: Peet Fouche
- Founded: 10 January 2020
- Preceded by: Front National
- Headquarters: Gauteng
- Ideology: Afrikaner nationalism Cultural conservatism Self-determination Volkstaat; Anti-communism; Christian right
- Political position: Far-right
- International affiliation: World National-Conservative Movement
- Colours: Orange, white and blue
- Slogan: Jou stem bepaal jou toekoms en die van jou kinders
- National Assembly: 0 / 400

Website
- afrikanerselfbeskikkingparty.co.za

Afrikaner Self-determination Party (Afrikaans: Afrikaner Selfbeskikking Party, AFRSP) is a South African far-right political party formed in 2020 as the successor to the Front National. The party promotes secession from South Africa and Afrikaner nationalism.

== See also ==
- Afrikaner nationalism
