= Boerestaat Party =

Political party in South Africa

Boerestaat Party Farmers State Party
- Leader: Coen Vermaak
- Founder: Robert van Tonder
- Founded: 30 September 1986
- Headquarters: Randfontein
- Ideology: Volkstaat; Boer nationalism Anti-abortion
- Political position: Right-wing

Party flag

Website
- boerestaatparty.org

The Boerestaat Party (English: Farmers State Party) is a Boer nationalist South African political party founded on 30 September 1986 by Robert van Tonder. It was never officially registered as a political party because it was unable to rally 500 persons under one roof, a requirement under South African electoral law for official political party status. It was never represented in the South African Parliament, neither in the apartheid era nor after democratisation. In 1989, it joined the Afrikaner Weerstandsbeweging (AWB) in declaring support for Jaap Marais, the leader of the Herstigte Nasionale Party and has worked with the HNP on occasion since. The party was a charter member of the Afrikaner Volksfront coalition group. It has also operated with the paramilitary group, the Boere Weerstandsbeweging (Boer Resistance Movement) led by Andrew Ford.

The BSP were the third group in South Africa to openly advocate the restoration of the South African Republic and the Orange Free State and call for the secession of these territories from the Union of South Africa. Other groups advocated this notion in the past, with the Maritz Rebellion of 1914 and the Ossewa Brandwag of the 1940s being the most notable . This policy was later taken on board by the AWB and other rightist movements. The BSP further argued that the Boer citizens of these nineteenth century republics should be considered as a distinct nation from the Afrikaners, known as a Boerestaat.

The BSP has been noted for adopting controversial views on AIDS and came out in support of the views on the subject expressed by Thabo Mbeki. The party has also taken an active role in ensuring that the Voortrekker Monument is cared for, with current leader Coen Vermaak a leading advocate in this campaign.

The current leader, Coen Vermaak, has become noted for his conspiratorial beliefs in white genocide. He has argued that the South Africa government is using contraceptives and abortion to stall white population growth. He stated: 'I am convinced the abortion law is aimed at getting rid of white babies'. Vermaak also believes that AIDS is hoax to encourage the use of condoms among white South Africans.

The party rejects universal suffrage, although it has said that voting rights should not be limited to whites. Vermaak believes that social status should determine voting power and that, for instance, doctors and homeless people should have different amounts of voting power. In 2015, 33.0% of medical students were white, despite making up only 8.4% of the population.
