= Vermaak =

Vermaak is an Afrikaans surname. Notable people with the surname include:

- Coen Vermaak, leader of the Boerestaat Party
- Ian Vermaak (1933–2025), South African tennis player
- Jano Vermaak (born 1985), South African rugby union player
- Yvonne Vermaak (born 1956), South African-born American tennis player
