= Wynand Boshoff =

South African Member of Parliament

Wynand Boshoff MP

Member of the National Assembly of South Africa
- Incumbent
- Assumed office 22 May 2019

Personal details
- Born: Wynand Johannes Boshoff; 26 May 1970 (age 56) Pretoria, Transvaal, South Africa
- Party: Freedom Front Plus (2011–present)
- Spouse: Esme Maritz
- Relations: Hendrik Verwoerd (grandfather)
- Children: 5
- Parent(s): Carel Boshoff (father); Anna Verwoerd (mother)
- Education: University of the Free State; University of Pretoria

Wynand Johannes Boshoff (born 26 May 1970) is a South African academic and politician from the Northern Cape serving as a Member of the National Assembly of South Africa for the Freedom Front Plus (FF+) since 2019. He has been serving as the Provincial Leader of the FF+ since 2015. He previously served as a municipal councillor of the Sol Plaatje Local Municipality from 2016 to 2019. Boshoff is the grandson of the assassinated apartheid-era Prime Minister of South Africa, Hendrik Verwoerd, who served from 1958 until 1966, and the son of Afrikaner enclave Orania founder, Carel Boshoff.

== Early life and education ==
Boshoff was born in Pretoria in the Transvaal Province as one of the children of Carel Boshoff and Anna Boshoff, daughter of Hendrik Frensch Verwoerd. Verwoerd served as Prime Minister of South Africa (1958–1966) and is described as the "architect of apartheid". Verwoerd was assassinated in 1966 by parliamentary messenger Dimitri Tsafendas.

Boshoff matriculated from high school in 1988 and went on to achieve a BA degree in Afrikaans and History at university. He obtained a master's degree in sustainable agriculture from the University of the Free State in 2004 and acquired a PhD in education sciences from the University of Pretoria in 2011. He submitted his doctoral dissertation on Employability of Successful Matriculants Toward Curriculum Studies and Instructional Design.

== Political career ==
In 2011, he became an ordinary branch member of the Freedom Front Plus, despite vowing in high school that he would never become active in politics. He was soon promoted to the post of Provincial Leader of the FF+ in April 2015. In August 2016, Boshoff became a PR councillor of the Sol Plaatje Local Municipality, centred around the town of Kimberley.

In May 2019, Boshoff was elected a Member of the National Assembly of South Africa. Media reports revealed that he is a grandchild of Hendrik Verwoerd, which consequently generated criticism of Boshoff. Boshoff responded to the criticism by stating that he wants to be judged by his own merits and not those of his grandfather's.

Boshoff was placed high enough on the Freedom Front Plus national list to be returned to parliament following the 2024 general election.

== Personal life ==
Boshoff has five children and resides in Orania and Kimberley.
