= Orania Representative Council =

Orania Representative Council Orania Verteenwoordigende Raad
- Representative Council
- The location of Orania - the seat of the Orania Representative Council - in the Northern Cape Orania Representative Council (South Africa)
- Coordinates: 29°49′S 24°24′E
- Country: South Africa
- Province: Northern Cape
- District: Pixley ka Seme
- First election: 1 November 1995
- Seat: Orania

Government
  - Type: Municipal council
  - Chairperson: Joost Strydom
- Time zone: UTC+2 (SAST)
- Municipal code: 304 02013

The Orania Representative Council (Afrikaans: Orania Verteenwoordigende Raad) is the local municipal representative council in the Northern Cape province of South Africa that governs the Afrikaner-town of Orania in the Pixley ka Seme District Municipality. During the implementation of a new municipal system in South Africa in 2000, the Orania Representative Council was the only representative council that was not abolished. Therefore, the Orania Representative Council is the only municipal body that still uses the old (pre-2000) municipal structure, based on the Local Government Transition Act of 1993.

Other than its municipal duties, the main task of the Orania Representative Council is to represent the inhabitants of Orania in ongoing negotiations with the Cabinet of South Africa about the municipal status of Orania.

== History ==
When Orania was bought by the Afrikaner Vryheidstigting (Afrikaner Freedom Foundation) in 1991, the village received the status of (private) farm village by the government of Province of the Cape of Good Hope. After apartheid, inhabitants of all towns in South Africa, including private towns such as farm and mining towns, got a transitional representative council based on the Local Government Transition Act. So Orania got its own transitional representative council in 1995.

=== Proposed merger with Hopetown and Strydenburg ===
In 2000 the South African government created a new form of local government with a municipal system. In general these municipalities are a combination of several towns and villages. In the process of this merger, the South African provincial governments informed local transitional representative councils about the intended merger and held a deliberation process, after which a final decision was made. These decisions - with the intended abolition of the transitional representative councils - were published in the provincial government gazettes.

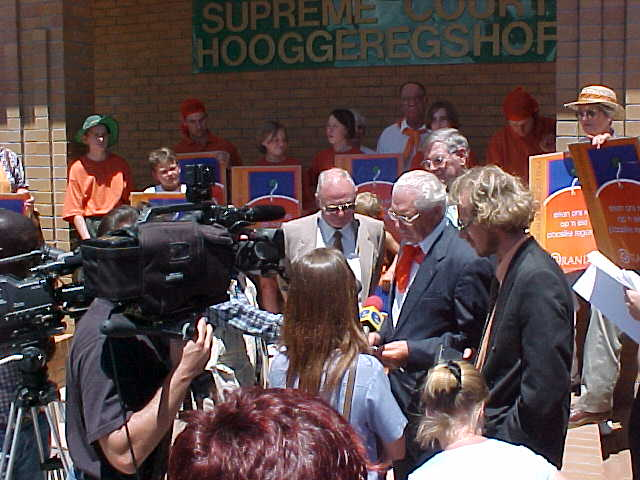
Carel Boshoff and other inhabitants of Orania in front of the Northern Cape High Court in Kimberley on 4 December 2000

In the case of Orania the provincial government of the Northern Cape did not publish the intended abolition of the Orania Transitional Representative Council, which was a legal obligation for a merger with Hopetown and Strydenburg into one single municipality. Since the provincial government learnt of this mistake, it has published a notice in the provincial gazette announcing its intention to abolish the Orania Transitional Representative Council. There was a possibility to object this announcement till 30 November 2000. Objections were sent in by Orania that day. When the Northern Cape government could not react in time, the Orania Transitional Council went to court. This lawsuit was handled by the Northern Cape High Court on 4 December 2000, one day before the nationwide local elections. In the light of the 1994 Accord on Afrikaner self-determination and the mistake of the South African government to not publish the abolition of the Orania Transitional Representative Council it was very likely that Orania would win the case, with the result that the High Court would cancel the elections scheduled for the next day.

=== Status of the Orania Representative Council ===
On 4 December 2000 the case was settled between Orania and the South African government. This agreement was affirmed by the Northern Cape High Court that same day. They agreed that:

1. The Orania Transitional Representative Council will remain in place indefinitely and will not be dissolved by the South African government by the implementation of the Municipal Structures Act (Act 117 of 1998);
2. The Orania Representative Council will remain in place with all its powers until there is an agreement between the South African government and the inhabitants of Orania about the status of Orania.;
3. Orania will lie within the geographical borders of the Thembelihle Local Municipality, but the Thembelihle Local Municipality will not have any power within the area that is governed by the Orania Representative Council. The Thembelihle Local Municipality will not deliver any services in Orania.

The special status of Orania only exists at the local level. At the district, provincial and national levels Orania is integral part of the South African political system.

=== Ongoing negotiations ===
In April 2001 a commission was installed by the Cabinet of South Africa on the question of Orania's municipal status. In 2002 the commission reached agreement and sent a proposal to the Cabinet of South Africa to merge Orania with Vanderkloof to become one municipality. Nothing was done with the proposal.

In 2007, the Orania Representative Council and the Northern Cape government agreed that the (municipal) status of Orania should be discussed at all government levels.

The negotiations about the status of Orania are still ongoing.

== Elections ==
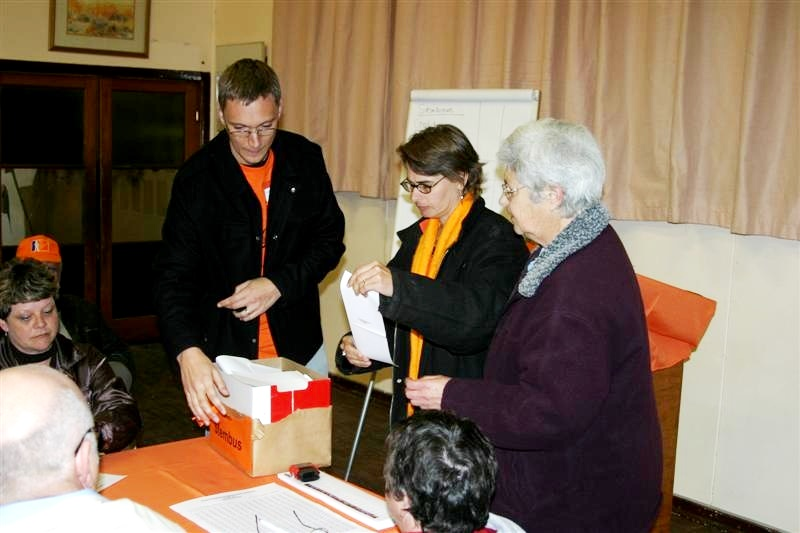
Vote counting after the local election in May 2011

Inhabitants of Orania vote for their representative council on the same day as the nationwide local elections. In 1995 the first elections for the Orania Transitional Representative Council were held. In 2000, 2006, 2011 and 2016 inhabitants of Orania voted for both the Orania Representative Council and the council of the Pixley ka Seme District Municipality, but not for the council of the Thembelihle Local Municipality.

=== 1995-96 municipal elections ===
The elections of 1995-96 were the first local elections in which citizens of all races were allowed to take part.

Orania Transitional Representative Council election, 1 November 1995
Party	Votes	Seats
VF+	178	3/3

=== 2000 and further ===
One day after the settlement of the case between Orania and the South African government on 4 December 2000, Orania held its own elections for the Orania Representative Council during the municipal elections of 2000. At the voting station of the Independent Electoral Commission in Orania, where people could vote for the new (Oranje-Karoo) Thembelihle Local Municipality, zero people voted, while the voter turnout at the voting station for the Orania Representative Council was above 90%.

In 2006, 2011 and 2016 citizens of Orania also voted for their own representative council. Elections are held on the same day as the municipal elections in the rest of South Africa. Between 2011 and 2016 the council consisted of eight members. In 2016 inhabitants voted for a twelve-member council.

==== 2021 election ====
Party	Vote %	Seats
VF+	87.75	11
DA	10.60	0
ACDP	1.66	0

== List of chairpersons ==
- 2000—2006: Carel Boshoff
- 2006—2011: Prinsloo Potgieter
- 2011—2016: John Strydom
- 2016—2019: Carel Boshoff IV
- 2019—present: John Strydom
