= National Conservative Party of South Africa =

Political party in South Africa

National Conservative Party of South Africa Nasionale Konserwatiewe Party van Suid-Afrika
- Leader: Valerie Byliefeldt
- Secretary-General: Tessa
- National Chairperson: Micheal Bluer
- Deputy Leader: Schalkie van der Merwe
- Chancellor: Fanie du Plooy
- Treasurer: Thomas Deyzel
- Activism: Riaan van Graan
- Founded: 16 April 2016
- Headquarters: Pretoria
- Student wing: National Student Conservative Party
- Youth wing: Youth Conservative Party of South Africa
- Women's League: National Conservative Women's League
- Ideology: Conservatism; Self-determination; Afrikaner nationalism White nationalism National conservatism
- Political position: Right-wing
- Colours: Blue, yellow and white
- Slogan: Freedom in our lifetime
- National Assembly: 0 / 400
- NCOP: 0 / 90

Website
- www.nkpsa.ga

The National Conservative Party of South Africa (Afrikaans: Nasionale Konserwatiewe Party van Suid-Afrika) is an Afrikaner nationalist political party formed on 16 April 2016 in Pretoria.

== Formation ==
The party was formed on 16 April 2016 by a wide spectrum of conservative and nationalist South Africans, many of whom had been members of the Conservative Party in the 1980s. Steve Hofmeyr, an Afrikaans singer and activist, was the main guest speaker at the founding congress on 16 April 2016. The party was registered as a political party by the Independent Electoral Commission on 27 May 2016.

== Ideology and policy ==
The party was also formed on the principles of the Conservative Party of Andries Treurnicht but with a modern approach.

Afrikaner self-determination is the core policy of the party, but that does not exclude other people of European descent, such as British South Africans, Irish, Portuguese, Greeks, Poles and Italians. They also focus on the protection of Afrikaner rights in today's South Africa. The ultimate goal of the party is external self-determination or secession from South Africa.

The party did not take part in the 2019 national or provincial elections and has been deregistered.

Schalkie van der Merwe was arrested together with his wife, Leoni van der Merwe, for conspiracy to commit murder on 23 February 2022. Leoni van der Merwe reportedly counted out the money for the hit wearing blue surgical gloves and wrapped up the money in an empty chips packet.

== Events ==
In January 2019, leader Willie Cloete and a number of other members left to join Front National.

== See also ==
- Conservative Party (South Africa)
- Volkstaat
- Self-determination
- Afrikaner nationalism
- "Party Website".
- "Founding Congress". Facebook.
- "Press Release in regards to founding congress".
