= Vereniging van Oranjewerkers =

White supremacist political movement in South Africa

Vereniging van Oranjewerkers ("Association of Orange Workers", sometimes shortened to simply Oranjewerkers) is a South African white separatist political movement that seeks a homeland for Afrikaners.

== History ==
Formed in 1980 by Wally Grant, H. F. Verwoerd junior (the son of Hendrik Frensch Verwoerd), Carel Boshoff and C. J. Joost, the group bemoaned the over-reliance of South Africa on a black workforce and sought to set up Oranjegroeipunte (Orange growth points) where the group would buy up land to settle unemployed white people on.

=== Morgenzon ===
Such a scheme was set up in Morgenzon. Oranjewerkers bought the town in 1982, and in the mid-1990s its population was 400 whites and 6,000 blacks.

Alongside this they also developed the plan of bolwerke ('bastions'), or privately owned farms whose landowners would undertake to stop utilising black labour.

=== Aftermath ===
Eschewing the party political route, the Oranjewerkers became more of a research group, undertaking a series of studies of the demographics of the country. Leading member Hercules Booysen termed their mission as dinamiese-konserwatisme, seeking newer ways to implement the old ideas of apartheid and the creation of a Volkstaat. Similar plans for redesigning the map of South Africa have been suggested by the group from time to time.

== In fiction ==
The organisation features prominently in Larry Bond's tale of a fictionalised Cold War conflict in South Africa, Vortex. By the novel's conclusion, they have succeeded in reaching their goal for an autonomous Afrikaner state under a post-apartheid government.

== See also ==
- Orania, Northern Cape
