= List of UNICEF national committees =

There are UNICEF National Committees in 32 countries worldwide, each established as an independent local non-governmental organization. Serving as the public face and dedicated voice of UNICEF, the National Committees raise funds from the private sector, promote children's rights, and secure worldwide visibility for children threatened by poverty, disasters, armed conflict, abuse and exploitation.

UNICEF is funded exclusively by voluntary contributions, and the National Committees collectively raise around one-third of UNICEF's annual income. This comes through contributions from corporations, civil society organizations and more than 6 million individual donors worldwide. They also rally many different partners – including the media, national and local government officials, NGOs, specialists such as doctors and lawyers, corporations, schools, young people and the general public – on issues related to children’s rights.

== Countries ==
The following countries are home to UNICEF national committees.

- UNICEF Committee for Andorra (French: UNICEF Comitè d'Andorra)
- UNICEF Australia
- UNICEF Austria (German: UNICEF Österreich)
- UNICEF Belgium
- UNICEF Canada
- (Czech Republic) Czech Committee for UNICEF (Czech: Český výbor pro UNICEF)
- UNICEF Denmark (Danish: UNICEF Danmark)
- UNICEF Finland (Finnish: Suomen UNICEF)
- UNICEF France
- UNICEF Germany (German: UNICEF Deutschland)
- Hong Kong Committee for UNICEF (Chinese: 聯合國兒童基金香港委員會)
- UNICEF Hungary
- UNICEF Iceland (Icelandic: UNICEF Ísland)
- (Republic of Ireland) UNICEF Ireland
- (Israel) Israeli Fund for UNICEF (Hebrew: יוניסף ישראל)
- UNICEF Italy (Italian: Comitato Italiano per l'UNICEF Onlus)
- UNICEF Japan
- (South Korea) Korean Committee for UNICEF
- UNICEF Luxembourg
- UNICEF the Netherlands
- UNICEF New Zealand
- UNICEF Norway (Norwegian: UNICEF Norge)
- UNICEF Poland (Polish: UNICEF Polska)
- UNICEF Portugal
- UNICEF Slovakia (Slovak: SV pre UNICEF)
- UNICEF Slovenia (Slovene: UNICEF Slovenija)
- UNICEF Spain (Spanish: UNICEF Comité Español)
- UNICEF Sweden (Swedish: UNICEF Sverige)
- UNICEF Switzerland and Liechtenstein
- UNICEF Turkey (Turkish: UNICEF Türkiye Milli Komitesi)
- (United Kingdom) UNICEF UK
- (United States) U.S. Fund for UNICEF
