= Ireland–South Africa relations =

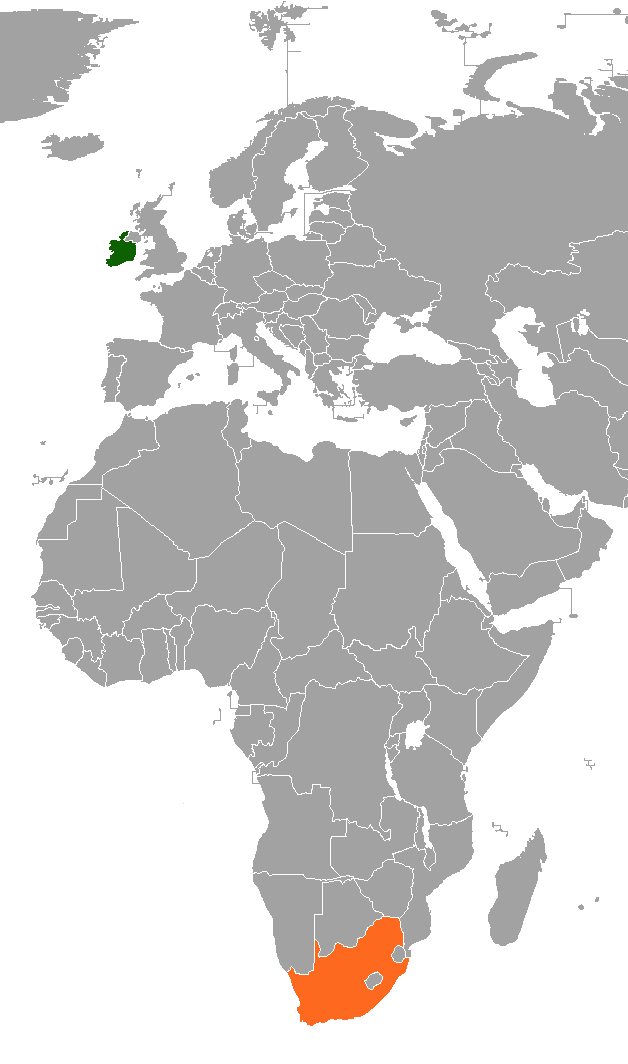

- Ireland: South Africa

There is a historical and current bilateral relationship between Ireland and South Africa. Both countries have established embassies in the territory of the other, in Dublin and Pretoria.

Former President of South Africa Jacob Zuma said there exists a "special relationship" between the two countries. In 2006 South Africa was Ireland's "33rd most important trading partner" and in 2008 trade between the two countries was worth more than €500 million per annum according to RTÉ.

== History ==
Irish missionaries have been working in South Africa since before 1860.

The opening of bilateral relations was strongly considered by both governments in the 1930s and 1940s, following a successful state visit by South African prime minister General J. B. M. Hertzog to Dublin in 1930. At that time, connections between the two "restless dominions" were particularly cordial, based also on an earlier Irish nationalist identification with the Boer cause during the South African War of 1899–1902, but cost concerns prevented an exchange of high commissioners. Nevertheless, there were regular private visits by South Africa's London-based high commissioners, most notably Charles te Water in the 1930s, and Dr A. L. Geyer, who was a guest of Taoiseach Éamon de Valera in 1952. While purely financial considerations had prevented the mutual exchange of ambassadors, by the 1960s a principled stand against apartheid came to prevent such an upgrading of relations. As a result, Ireland was the only EU country that did not have full diplomatic relations with South Africa until 1993. An exchange of ambassadors was agreed with the De Klerk administration in anticipation of the ending of apartheid, despite vociferous protests from the Irish Anti-Apartheid Movement, led by Kader and Louise Asmal, which regarded such relations as premature. The Irish embassy opened in Pretoria in 1994.

From the early 1960s Ireland vehemently opposed apartheid in South Africa. South African Nelson Mandela, then a dissident, later president, was awarded the Freedom of the City of Dublin in 1988 while a political prisoner; he collected the award upon his release in 1990. Diplomatic ties between the two countries were established in 1994.

In November 2003, Brian Cowen, while touring Africa as Irish Minister for Foreign Affairs, promised South African President Thabo Mbeki that Ireland would highlight African problems when it ascended to the Council Presidency of the European Union in January 2004.

Deputy President of South Africa Phumzile Mlambo-Ngcuka and many other South African government ministers met President of Ireland Mary McAleese, Taoiseach Bertie Ahern and other Irish officials in Dublin in November 2006. They came to examine Ireland's economic boom, the Celtic Tiger.

Micheál Martin led a trade mission to South Africa in September 2006. Contracts were signed.

Bertie Ahern and Micheál Martin led a three-day trade mission to South Africa in January 2008. ESB International and Eskom signed a new €4.5 million contract at Eskom's Johannesburg HQ. Other trade deals between the two countries came about too.

=== Aid ===
The Irish Aid – South Africa programme was established by the Government of Ireland in 1994.

The Niall Mellon Township Trust has been in operation since 2002 and hosts an annual building blitz which aims to make life better for the people of South Africa's townships. 15,000 houses were constructed between 2002 and 2010. Taoiseach Bertie Ahern visited it while in South Africa in 2008. South African President Jacob Zuma hosted a reception for Mellon at his private residence in Cape Town in November 2010, describing the work done by Ireland as "unique" and "very powerful".

== Resident diplomatic missions ==
- Ireland has an embassy in Pretoria.
- South Africa has an embassy in Dublin.

== See also ==
- Foreign relations of the Republic of Ireland
- Foreign relations of South Africa
- Melanie Verwoerd
- Irish South Africans
