= Morgenzon =

- Location within Mpumalanga Location within South Africa
- Coordinates: 26°43′59″S 29°36′55″E
- Country: South Africa
- Province: Mpumalanga
- District: Gert Sibande
- Municipality: Lekwa

Area
  - Total: 4.19 km^{2} (1.62 sq mi)
- Elevation: 1,624 m (5,328 ft)

Population (2011)
  - Total: 1,893
  - Density: 452/km^{2} (1,170/sq mi)

Racial makeup (2011)
  - Black African: 53.1%
  - Coloured: 1.4%
  - Indian/Asian: 1.6%
  - White: 43.2%
  - Other: 0.6%

First languages (2011)
  - Zulu: 48.4%
  - Afrikaans: 38.0%
  - South African English: 5.5%
  - Swazi: 1.9%
  - Other: 6.2%
- Time zone: UTC+2 (SAST)
- Postal code (street): 2315
- PO box: 2315
- Area code: 017

Morgenzon (Dutch for morning sun) is a small farming town situated on the banks of the Osspruit River (Ox Stream) with an agricultural school in Mpumalanga province, South Africa. The town is 45 km south-west of Ermelo and 35 km south-east of Bethal.

== History ==
The town was laid out in 1912 on the farm Morgenzon and has been administered by a village council since 1920. Named after the farm, Morgenzon is Dutch for ‘morning sun’. It was established around the Marnico Hotel which was built in 1912 on a wagon stopover between Standerton and Ermelo, Mpumalanga.

During the early 1990s, Morgenzon was the site of a failed attempt to set up a homeland for white South Africans. The idea originated in the early 1980s, when Hendrik Verwoerd Jr, son of the former prime minister Hendrik Verwoerd, moved to Morgenzon along with a group known as Oranjewerkers.

Ultimately only 20 families followed him, as his plans required them to give up their black servants and labourers, and most of Morgenzon's whites were reluctant to perform the menial tasks that were otherwise reserved for blacks.

== See also ==
- Owendale, Northern Cape
- Balmoral, Mpumalanga
