= BCVO =

Calvinist Afrikaans schools in South Africa

The Beweging vir Christelik-Volkseie Onderwys (BCVO; English: Movement for Christian Nationalist Education) is an educational organisation in South Africa that provides primary and secondary education (grade 1 through 12) in the Calvinist tradition and Afrikaans language. There are currently 41 directly affiliated schools throughout South Africa—mainly in the areas of the former "Boer Republics" of the Orange Free State and the Transvaal, educating approximately 2100 children.

== Principles ==
The schools affiliated with the BCVO are committed to the following principles:

1. Teaching that the Bible is the divinely inspired and infallible Word of God and the highest authority.
2. Teaching that all facts in the universe are God-given realities, and that these facts are to be studied in their ontological, genesiological and teleological relationship to Christ as Creator and Redeemer of said realities.
3. Teaching conservative, Christian values in a secular world.
4. Teaching the Calvinist-Reformed faith and holding to all its doctrines against heresies.
5. Teaching Afrikaner culture and history, constantly reminding Afrikaner children of their heritage and identity.

== Academics ==
The BCVO had an examination body, the Examination Board for Christian Education (acronym: ERCO - Afrikaans: "EksamenRaad vir Christelike Onderwys") (formerly called the "Onafhanklike Afrikaanse Eksamenraad" (OAER)), which was accredited and registered with the government institutions, including the quality controlling body, Umalusi. Accreditation was however revoked in 2012 and after reverting to the government examinations for a while, from 2014 BCVO students matriculate via the examinations of the internationally acclaimed Independent Examination Board, which is run independently but in accordance with government curriculum outlines and accreditation of Umalusi.

== Sport ==
Various sports are played in BCVO schools, most notably rugby for boys and netball for girls in various age groups, from under-7 to under-19. Other sports like tennis and cricket are also played, although interest and participation in these sports are limited.

The BCVO holds its annual national athletics competition during March, in which the top athletes from various schools in the different districts (Eastern Transvaal, Northwest and Central Transvaal; Limpopo, and the Orange Free State) participate.

The highlight on the BCVO sporting calendar, however, is the "BCVO Winterspele" (Winter Games), held annually in June, where nearly 650 rugby players and 300 netball players participate in various age groups, representing their regions. An under 19 national BCVO Rugby side, consisting of a squad of 22 players, and a national under 19 netball side, consisting of a squad of 10 players, are selected at the end of the games.

Teams are selected to participate in the Bokkieweek.

== See also ==
- Afrikaans
- Afrikaner Calvinism
- Afrikaner Nationalism
- Boer
