= Front National (South Africa) =

Political party in South Africa

- Operational Head: Adv Jurg Prinsloo
- Founded: 7 December 2013
- Dissolved: 10 January 2020
- Preceded by: Federale Vryheidsparty
- Succeeded by: Afrikaner Self-determination Party
- Headquarters: Pretoria, Gauteng
- Student wing: Front National Student Movement / Front Nasionaal Studente Beweging
- Youth wing: Front Nationaal Jeug / Front National Youth
- Ideology: Afrikaner nationalism Cultural conservatism Volkstaat
- Political position: Far-right
- International affiliation: World National-Conservative Movement (2015)
- Colours: Red, white and blue
- Slogan: Jou stem bepaal jou toekoms en die van jou kinders
- National Assembly seats: 0 / 400

Front National (Afrikaans: Front Nasionaal, FN) was a South African far-right political party formed in late 2013 as a successor to the Federale Vryheidsparty. The party promoted secession and Afrikaner nationalism. Front National strikes no distinction between English-speaking Whites and Afrikaners in South Africa. The party reformed in January 2020 as the Afrikaner Self-determination Party.

== Land claim ==
On 24 April 2014, FN submitted a land claim to the Land Claims Commissioner in Pretoria on behalf of the Afrikaner nation. The new land claims process has not yet been finalised however.

== Activism ==
=== Clive Derby-Lewis ===
Front National advocated the release of Clive Derby-Lewis, who by 2015 was the oldest prisoner in the South African Correctional Services at the age of 79. He had been behind bars since 1993. Derby-Lewis made various bids for parole from June 2010, when he was diagnosed with lung cancer. In February, 2014, Derby-Lewis and his co-conspirator in the Hani murder, Janusz Waluś, lives were threatened when they were stabbed several times and had their heads struck with locks by fellow inmates. It had been the stance of Front National that there was political interference with his parole application.

The party approached the United Nations Commission on Human Rights over the handling of Derby-Lewis's medical parole application.

Derby-Lewis was released in June 2015, and died in November 2016.

=== South African Human Rights Commission ===
On 14 January 2016 the party declared intentions to make a complaint against Democratic Alliance Leader Mmusi Maimane with the South African Human Rights Commission concerning remarks he made on Twitter stating "I am angry when I go shopping at certain shops – white people are shopping and black people are working.”

On 24 January 2019, Willie Cloete, the leader, and a number of followers of the National Conservative Party joined Front National.

== Affiliation ==
Front National has civil affiliations with Boere Krisis Aksie (BKA), which is self-described as a "Politieke drukgroep vir selfbeskikking en wit belange in Suid Afrika", translated as "[a] Political pressure group for self-determination and white interests in South Africa".

Front National has media affiliations with South Africa Today (SAT).

== Elections ==
The party contested the 2014 general election in the national ballot and the provincial ballot for Gauteng. and the 2019 election on the national ballot only, failing to win any seats on either occasion.

=== Parliament ===
National Assembly
Election year	# of overall votes	% of overall vote	# of overall seats won	+/–
2014	5,138	0.03%	0 / 400	–
2019	7,144	0.04%	0 / 400	±0

==== Provincial ballot ====
Election	Eastern Cape		Free State		Gauteng		Kwazulu-Natal		Limpopo		Mpumalanga		North-West		Northern Cape		Western Cape
Election	%	Seats	%	Seats	%	Seats	%	Seats	%	Seats	%	Seats	%	Seats	%	Seats	%	Seats
2014	–	–	–	–	0.05%	0/73	–	–	–	–	–	–	–	-	–	–	–	–

== See also ==
- Afrikaner nationalism
