= Volkstaat Council =

- Volkstaatraad

Constitutional body overview
- Formed: May 26, 1994
- Dissolved: April 30, 2001
- Superseding Constitutional body: Commission for the Promotion and Protection of the Rights of Cultural, Religious and Linguistic Communities
- Jurisdiction: Republic of South Africa
- Headquarters: Pretoria, South Africa
- Constitutional body executives: Johann Wingard, Chairman; Dirk Viljoen, Vice-chairman
- Key documents: Accord on Afrikaner self-determination; Constitution of South Africa Amendment Act 2 of 1994; Volkstaat Council Act 30 of 1994; Constitution of the Republic of South Africa, 1996; Repeal of the Volkstaat Council Provisions Act 30 of 2001

The Volkstaat Council (Afrikaans: Volkstaatraad) was an organisation of 20 people, created by the South African government, to serve as a constitutional mechanism to enable proponents of the idea of a Volkstaat to constitutionally pursue the establishment of such a Volkstaat.

== Members ==
The members, all sympathisers of the Volkstaat idea, were: Johann Wingard, a retired industrialist and chairman of the council, Dirk Viljoen, a town planner (vice-chairman), Anna Boshoff, daughter of Hendrik Verwoerd, her son Carel, the nuclear scientist Wally Grant, Chris de Jager, Mars de Klerk and Hercules Booysen, three jurists, Ernest Pienaar, former general in the South African Defence Force, "Natie" Luyt, Piet Liebenberg, Chris Jooste and Pikkie Robbertze, four academics, Koos Reyneke, an architect, Douw Steyn, a senior member of the civil defence system, Herman Vercueil from the Transvaalse Landbou-unie, Kobus Visser, a former head of the Criminal Investigation Department, Flip Buys, an executive of the trade union Solidarity, Duncan du Bois, a local politician in Durban and Riaan Visagie, a teacher.

== History ==
The Volkstaat Council was created by the South African government, via the Volkstaat Council Act in 1994. This was in accordance with sections 184A and 184B of the 1993 South African Constitution, which state: "The Council shall serve as a constitutional mechanism to enable proponents of the idea of a Volkstaat to constitutionally pursue the establishment of such a Volkstaat."

The council's funding was terminated in 1999, without the council being formally disbanded. The council produced a final report, making three key recommendations:

1. That areas with an Afrikaner majority should enjoy "territorial self-determination". Areas identified included the region around Pretoria, and a region of the Northern Cape Province.
2. That the government establish an "Afrikaner Council", as an advisory board to the government. "Representation in parliament, where numerical power is all that mattered, was not seen as a democratic system for minorities."
3. That the government create legislation enacting the other two points. Draft legislation for the Afrikaner Council was provided.

The provisions in the constitution allowing for formation of the council were removed in 2001, by the Repeal of Volkstaat Council Provisions Act, in accordance with the original act.

== Aftermath ==
Johann Wingard, chair of the council, expressed the view in 2005 that he doubted if any government official ever opened any of the reports to read them. Additionally, he stated that only a "civil war" would ever enable Afrikaners to gain independence in any part of South Africa. The opposite is suggested, however, by the fact that then deputy president, Thabo Mbeki, and then Minister of Home Affairs, Dr Mangosuthu Buthelezi, quoted figures from Volkstaat Council reports in a report to parliament in 1999. Nelson Mandela, the president at the time, specially requested that the delivery of the report be delayed until he could attend its presentation personally.

Subsequent to the disbanding of the Volkstaat Council, the Commission for the Promotion and Protection of the Rights of Cultural, Religious and Linguistic Communities was established in 2003. This committee is charged with the protection of the rights to cultural identity of all self-identifying groups in South Africa, including Afrikaners. The committee includes an Afrikaner, JCH Landman, who is also a member of the Afrikaner Alliance. The reports from the Volkstaat Council were to be handed over to this committee.

The ANC government formalised their stance on the issue in 1998-1999, when they declared that they would not support a Volkstaat, but would do everything they could to ensure the protection of the Afrikaner language and culture, along with the other minority cultures in the country.
