= Melanie Verwoerd =

South African politician and diplomat

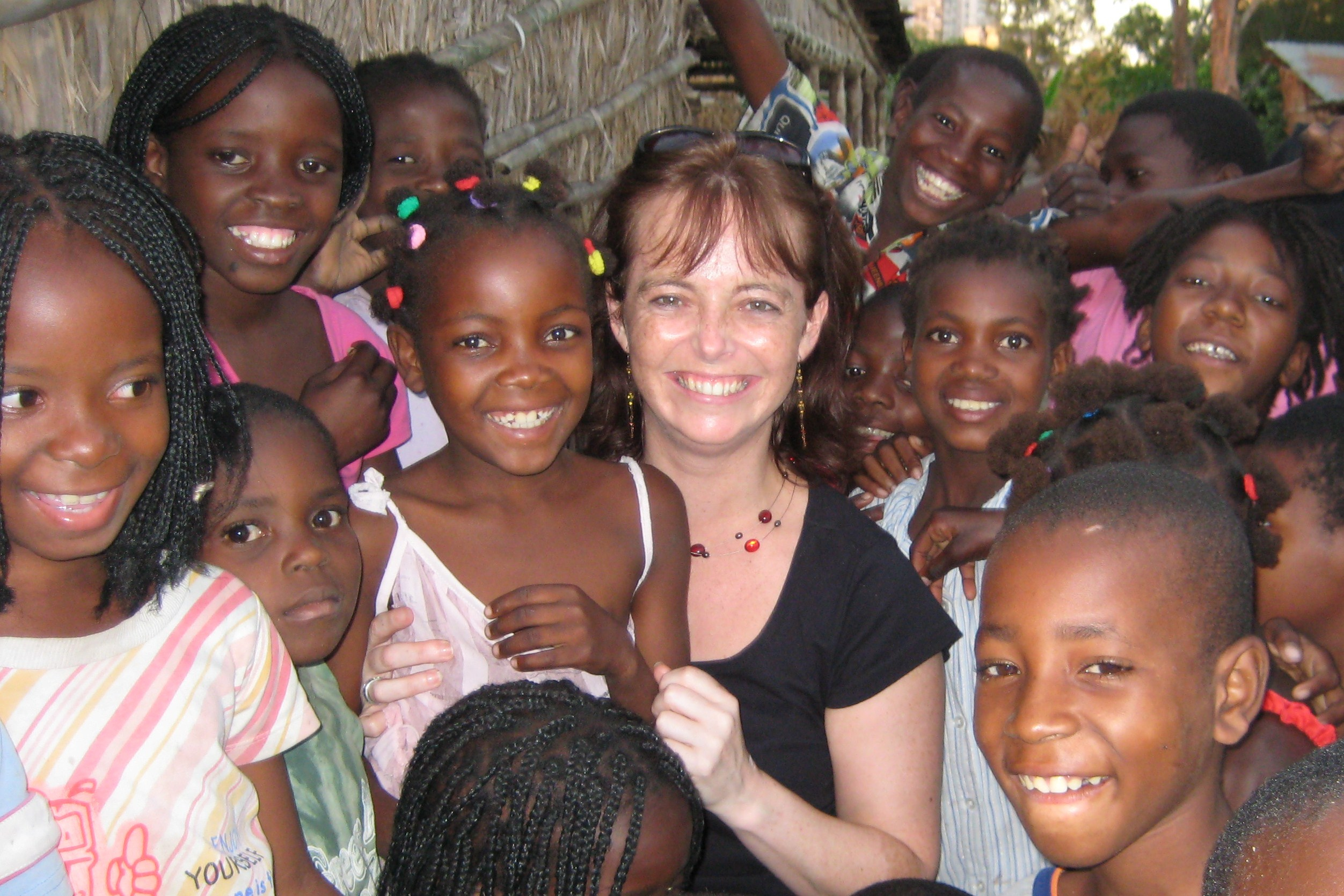
- Verwoerd in Mozambique in 2008

South African Ambassador to Ireland
- In office 2001–2005
- President: Thabo Mbeki
- Preceded by: Pierre Dietrichsen
- Succeeded by: Priscilla Jana

Member of the National Assembly of South Africa
- In office 9 May 1994 – March 2001

Personal details
- Born: Melanie Van Niekerk; 18 April 1967 (age 59) Pretoria, South Africa
- Party: African National Congress
- Spouse: Wilhelm Verwoerd (m. 1987; div. 2005)
- Domestic partner: Gerry Ryan (2008–died 2010)
- Children: 2
- Education: University of Stellenbosch
- Occupation: Political analyst; author; former politician and diplomat
- Website: Website
- Writing career
- Notable works: When We Dance – A Memoir (The Verwoerd Who Toyi-toyied); 21 at 21: The Coming of Age of a Nation; Our Madiba: Stories and Reflections From Those Who Loved Him

Melanie Verwoerd (Afrikaans: [fərˈvuːrt]; née Van Niekerk; born 18 April 1967) is a South African and Irish political analyst and former diplomat and politician. She was previously the director of UNICEF Ireland.

Verwoerd was elected as a Member of Parliament for the African National Congress (ANC) during the first democratic elections in South Africa in 1994, and re-elected in 1999. In 2001, she was appointed as the South African Ambassador to Ireland, a position she held until 2005. Between 2007 and 2011 she was the executive director of UNICEF Ireland.

== Early life and education ==
Melanie Verwoerd was born Melanie Van Niekerk on 18 April 1967 in Pretoria, but grew up in Strand, Western Cape, and Stellenbosch. She was later adopted by her mother’s second husband and changed her name to Melanie Fourie. The name “Melanie” is stressed on the second syllable (meh-LAH-nee), not on the first syllable as in English. She was brought up in what she described as a middle-class, conservative and Calvinist Afrikaner household, with both her parents being academics. She is of Dutch descent. She described her parents as both being supporters of the ruling National Party.

In 2005, she described her youth in Stellenbosch as growing in an almost all-white world, as the only black South Africans she saw were servants as under apartheid, Stellenbosch was reserved for whites. She described her youth as: "Usual Afrikaner story, grew up in a very traditional Afrikaans household, white schools, white church-Dutch Reformed-white neighbourhood". Fourie's ancestors took part in the Great Trek of 1835-1840 when a number of Boers, as the Afrikaners called themselves, at the time left the British Cape Colony to go inland to found the two Boer republics of the Orange Free State and the South African Republic (commonly known as the Transvaal Republic).

To be a descendant of the Boer Voortrekkers is considered to be a great honour in Afrikaner culture. Like most Afrikaners, her family's rise to middle class status was only recent as she recalled: "My grandparents were farmers, working a subsistence farm about the size of a small Irish one; they had a few cows, pigs and vegetables. My grandmother was an enormously important part of my life. She was a typically strong, but tiny, Afrikaner woman -- absolutely fearless, very aware of her Trekker history in South Africa. I loved her to bits".

Fourie studied Calvinist theology at the University of Stellenbosch, being the only woman in the class of about 50 men, as theology was traditionally considered to be a male subject in Afrikaner culture.

The Dutch Reformed Church had traditionally played an inordinate role in Afrikaner culture, being described by the American journalist David Goodman as playing "...a crucial role in providing the theological and moral underpinnings of Afrikaner nationalism" as the church used the Calvinist doctrine of predestination (with "the elect" predestined for heaven) to argue apartheid was just because the Afrikaners were "God's chosen people".

Critics often dubbed the Dutch Reformed Church as "the National Party at prayer". Fourie's ambition as an young woman was to be a minister in the church, but she came to be disillusioned with it because of what she called its systematic sexism and racism as she taught in her university courses that God had ordinated inequality for humanity with women to be subservient to men and blacks subservient to whites. She admitted that her choice of a subject to major in at university was a quixotical one as the Dutch Reformed Church did not ordain women as ministers at the time, but stated she was gripped by a "deeply religious passion" at the time.

As a young woman, she dated and later married Wilhelm Verwoerd, the grandson of former South African prime minister Hendrik Verwoerd, the "architect of apartheid" who as the Native Affairs Minister brought in the laws that established apartheid after the National Party won the 1948 election and served as prime minister from 1958 until his assassination in 1966. She met Verwoerd in 1985 in her theology class at the University of Stellenbosch.

== Anti-apartheid activist ==
=== Change of position ===
Verwoerd started out as a supporter of apartheid, saying in her "Christian national education" she was brought up in to believe that apartheid was the natural system for South Africa. Her fiancé, Wilhelm Verwoerd, was a Rhodes scholar, and she credited her time living in the Netherlands for three months prior to moving to Oxford in 1986 as changing her views. During this time she met several South African exiles who showed her books banned in South Africa, which she stated gave her a new perspective on her country.

In particular, the 1978 book Biko by Donald Woods about the Black Consciousness Movement activist Stephen Biko - who died as a result of a beating given by the South African police - was described by her as having a major impact in giving her another perspective on apartheid.

Biko was banned in South Africa at the time. Additionally, she was shown the trial transcripts of the Rivonia Trial, where Nelson Mandela and the other African National Congress (ANC) leaders were convicted of plotting to blow up the South African power grid. Verwoerd stated that she had been brought up to believe that Mandela and the ANC leaders convicted at the Rivonia trial were "terrorists", but that reading his speeches at the trial changed her view of him.

At the trial, Mandela admitted that he was guilty as charged, but that he only decided to use violence because non-violence had failed. Mandela stated that the ANC had pursued non-violent resistance fruitlessly for decades and all that the South African government had done was to take away more and more rights from black South Africans like himself, leading him to the conclusion that violence was the "only way out". Verwoerd recalled about her debates with South African exiles: "They just hammered me for nights. And I tried every rational argument in the books about Buthelezi [a pro-apartheid Zulu chief], about everything. After a few nights, the arguments didn't work out very well. I came back and I was quite shattered. It was very hard. I felt that every authority figure I had ever known had been lying to me. I was angry, disillusioned. I must have been an extremely difficult student after that".

In late 1986, she met a group of South African emigres in London who "...told us about a country that I did not know of and I will be forever thankful for that". Fourie became involved with the National Union of South African Students and the Institute for Democratic Alternatives in South Africa. At IDASA conferences held in secret, she met several "banned people" who would appear briefly to speak at the conferences before disappearing again.

Her turn against apartheid exposed her to some risk because she remembered: "...if you opened your mouth too much, the Security Police, who had people in every single class, in every single hostel - fellow students - would start taking notes. But they were so stupid, it was always easy to know which ones they were".

In 1988, she studied for a Masters of Arts in Feminist Theology at Oxford, and returned to South Africa in 1990. On 11 February 1990, Nelson Mandela, the leader of the ANC was released from prison, and Verwoerd from her apartment in Oxford watched his release live on television while exchanging a toast of champagne with her husband. Verwoerd stated her Master's thesis at Oxford was: "It's all about the gender issues in religion. Like Roman Catholicism, the Dutch Reformed Church [one of the supporting blocks of apartheid] was vehemently opposed to women clergy. I wanted to buck that. I was the only girl in a class of 50 men when I was doing my Masters, which was a strange experience for me as I had no brothers, only sisters, and had gone to an all-girls' school".

=== Joining the ANC ===
In 1990, after his release from prison, she met Mandela, the leader of the ANC who had imprisoned in 1964 under Prime Minister Verwoerd, which inspired her to join the ANC. Her husband had wanted to meet Mandela to apologize for his suffering in prison, leading to her meeting Mandela at a cocktail party. After meeting the ANC leader, Verwoerd told her husband "I'm sick and tired of that 'them and us' feeling", leading her to join the Stellenbosch chapter of the ANC. Verwoerd stated that the day after meeting Mandela she was driving home from work when she saw a group of black women line up to leave the all white town of Stellenbosch just before 5:00 pm when their work passes expired left her with the feeling that South Africa was too divided and something needed to be done to bridge the racial gap. Shortly afterwards, Verwoerd was promoted to the executive community of the Stellenbosh ANC chapter. Her decision to join the ANC made headlines in South African newspapers, which reported that "A Verwoerd is in the ANC". Her father-in-law and mother-in-law, both of whom were supporters of apartheid disowned her, expressing the shame that their son had married her, and as of 2004, she had not spoken to them for years. In a 2002 interview, Wilhelm Verwoerd Sr. called her "an upstart" and "violently feministic".

From late 1992 to April 1994, Verwoerd together with her husband spoke constantly at ANC rallies. Irish journalist Catherine Cleary wrote in 2005: "In the early 1990s the Verwoerds, whose story has a film-script flavour, were the poster boy and girl of South Africa's journey from apartheid to democracy." Her decision to seek election as an ANC candidate in the 1994 elections was controversial as she was a mother and as the expectation within the Afrikaner culture is that women, especially mothers, should stay at home, not work outside. Verwoerd described her decision to seek a political career as "weird in South Africa. People don't do that". During the 1994 election campaign, she received a number of death threats from right-wing Afrikaners for whom she was a "renegade"."

She stated that while campaigning in the 1994 election that she met a favorable reception from black South Africans as she recalled: "Not once did I get any resentment or anger or suspicion while campaigning. Sometimes people needed to ask questions in a very careful and polite way. People would tell you things like: 'I know it's horrible to say this, but the day Verwoerd was assassinated we danced in the streets.' It was like reclaiming a country that I didn't know existed."

=== Afrikaner reaction ===
Verwoerd stated that she felt that Afrikaner culture was highly conformist with little room for dissent as she said: "As long as you stay in the laager [a defensive circle of wagons used by the Boers during their wars with the Zulu in the 19th century], you can face a few ways, you can be a little bit of step - they will bear with you...But then when you step out of the laager and actually do something which is not in line, then the laager closes and you are out of it. It's a well known thing with Afrikaners. It's been like that since the Boer War, with the people who sided with the English. Calling an Afrikaner a renegade is a vicious thing to say to someone". As such, her decision to campaign against apartheid made her into something of an outcast within the Afrikaner community. Verwoerd recalled in 2007: "It was a very difficult time. My grandparents were extremely upset by my joining the ANC because the area they lived in was very strongly peopled by the AWB [the extreme right-wing Afrikaner movement]. But when the press leaked the fact that there was a Verwoerd in the ANC camp, all hell broke loose...I lost every single friend I had. I remember being spat on as I walked along the streets in Stellenbosch."

With her husband, Verwoerd had two children.

== Political and diplomatic career ==
=== National Assembly ===
In the first fully democratic elections in South Africa, in 1994, Verwoerd, standing for the ANC, was elected as a member of the National Assembly of South Africa. She was re-elected in 1999. During her time in parliament, she was involved in the writing of the new Constitution of South Africa, and served on various parliamentary committees, including Local Government and Constitutional Affairs, the Youth Committee, Broadcasting and Communication, and Tourism and Environmental Affairs Portfolio. She took part in fact-finding missions, travelling to various locations including The Netherlands, UK, Sweden, Cuba, Chile, Australia, Brazil, Argentina, and the US. She was involved in the Women's Caucus, served as a resource person on the Women's Budget, and was a member of the Standing Committee investigating surrogacy.

During a visit to the United States, she was constantly slighted as it was assumed that she was a secretary to the otherwise all black group of MPs. She recalled about the trip: "The organisers could not understand what I was doing there. Time and again, it was assumed that I was a secretary, or I was just ignored. Things became so bad that my ANC colleagues insisted they would cancel the rest of the trip if the situation did not improve. I learnt a few important lessons during this trip. Firstly, I felt first-hand what it is like to be excluded on the grounds of race. Secondly, I realised that in South Africa we were far ahead of the US when it came to the principle of non-racialism. We were living and practising inclusivity, whereas the debate in the States was clearly still an us-and them proposition. I returned to South Africa disillusioned and emotionally bruised."

Under apartheid, black South Africans were not permitted to own land as individuals (through in certain reservations land was administered by the tribal elites), and in the 1994 election, the ANC promised land reform, vowing to give 30% of black South Africans individual land ownership by 1999. In addition, the ANC promised to build one million modern houses for black South Africans (the vast majority of whom did not live in formal housing) and to provide running water and electricity to all South Africans. In 2000, Verwoerd admitted that the ANC had failed to carry out its 1994 election program, saying: "We didn't realize the enormous constraints that we would face once in government...I'm absolutely convinced that the people in the ANC are committed as always to deliver, to the point that they actually get frenetic about it. It's no easy task-the job's just too big and the resources are too scarce".

Verwoerd stated about her identity: "I always make an effort to speak Afrikaans because it is a part of my identity. I guess I should be learning how to speak other African languages, because that would send a message, but I have not. I get quite annoyed and irritated if somebody tells me that Afrikaans should not have a place in our society. It should have a place, but its place should not be privileged. It is fine to speak Afrikaans as long as it is not used to exclude people. This is why I objected to the concept of a white Afrikaans university, which would just become a conservative, white university".

As an MP, she championed the rights of the wine industry workers, who were mostly black and "colored" (the South African term for mixed race people) against the white owners of the South African wine industry. Her advocacy work led to incidents where the owners of the vineyards set dogs upon her. About the South African wine industry concentrated in the Cape province, she wrote in 2014: "Behind the high dam walls or trees, there were literally thousands of labourers leading a meagre existence in grim shacks and hovels, secluded from the outside world. These labourers were the invisible machine that pumped out the gallons of wine destined for the tables of the privileged people of South Africa and Europe". As an MP, she wrote that she had: "...immediately discovered a secret world of abuse, exploitation, and squalor that was horrifying even by the standards of apartheid-era South Africa. Traditionally, farm labourers would remain on the same farms for generations, working and raising their families, but despite this they had no legal land-tenure rights. Some farmers treated them as possessions, no more or less entitled than their sheep or cows, and would kick them off the land at any time they felt like it". The Mandela government passed a law to improve working conditions in the wine industry, which was widely ignored at first.

As an MP, she set up about collecting complaints from the workers of the wine industry to pass on to the government to enforce the law. She received a deluge of complaints from wine industry laborers, whom charged that they were being treated as essentially slave labor. As part of her investigation into the wine industry, Verwoerd had to don disguises when she went out to the countryside at night to avoid the angry farmers who did not welcome her activities. Verwoerd wrote: "Slowly but surely, farm workers became more aware of their rights and grew in confidence. My constituency office close to the Du Toit station [in Stellenbosch] increasingly saw rows of workers waiting patiently outside to see me. We started taking farmers to court and winning, and I became a real thorn in the farmers’ side."

In 1996, she left Stellenbosch for Cape Town as she and her family were being ostracized and harassed by the other whites in Stellenbosch. Verwoerd made a point of enrolling her children in a multi-racial school in Cape Town, wanting her children to be exposed to children of other races. A number of the students at the school were Muslim Cape Malays, which she credited with inspiring her children to have a more tolerant view of Muslims after the 9/11 terrorist attacks. Verwoerd formed an alliance with the other female MPs to press for concerns such as the lack of child care at the parliament, inspiring her and the other women MPs to all bring their children to work one day, throwing parliament into chaos, but which led the parliament to set up a creche the same day. Verwoerd stated at the time: "The hardest thing about being a MP has been the personal price. I think women do women a great disfavor by pretending it's easy when it is not. I don't think it is easy for anybody, especially not for women with small children".

After the ANC won the 1994 election, she admitted that she was concerned that power was corrupting the ANC and that the ANC was turning into "ordinary political party" as she stated "power is very seductive. So is money". She took heart from a speaking at an ANC rally in 1999 at a poor black township in Northern Cape province where she apologized for the fact that the ANC government had failed to provide modern houses, running water and electricity for the people in the townships as it had promised in the 1994 election, only for an elderly black man to raise up and say: "You know, I've waited fifty years of my life, and it's the first time that I've seen a member of parliament. Just the fact that you came here will make me wait for another five years". Verwoerd stated: "That haunts me at night, old men like that. Because I don't want him to wait another five years. I would like him to have his house tomorrow".

=== Ambassador to Ireland ===
In 2001, she was appointed as South African Ambassador to Ireland. She asked President Thabo Mbeki for an ambassadorship and asked specifically for Ireland. Wilhelm Verwoerd Jr. had been involved in the Truth and Reconciliation Commission in South Africa, which led him to become interested in a similar project for Northern Ireland. On 20 March 2001, Verwoerd arrived at the Áras an Uachtaráin to present her credentials as the ambassador of South Africa to Ireland to President Mary McAleese. In late 2001, Verwoerd was one of the founders of the Africa Solidarity Center in Dublin intended to break down prejudices against African refugees in Ireland. In 2002, when a report showed that two-thirds of those seeking asylum in Ireland had to live emergency accommodation as many landlords did not like to rent to them, Verwoerd called for more multiculturalism and integration in Ireland.

During her period as ambassador, she focused on encouraging increased tourism from Ireland to South Africa, which increased by 300% from 2001 to 2005. Besides for promoting tourism, she also had the task of promoting South African wines to the Irish middle class. In 2001, she presided over a function at the South African embassy to promote South African wine where she had to deal with the same owners of the vineyards who tried to chase her away in the 1990s, leading her to recall: "It was hilarious. It was typical-the best of South Africa, in a way. They all had a good laugh about it. I threatened them all with fair-trade agreements, and we drank on it and moved on". She also spoke on the challenges facing South Africa and the developing world, particularly the challenge of HIV/AIDS. In 2003, the former South African president Mandela visited Ireland to host the Special Olympics and Verwoerd as the South African ambassador served as his guide. As part of her duties, she introduced him to a host of Irish celebrities such as Bono and the rest of the U2 band, the businessman Tony O'Reilly and the actor Pierce Brosnan, the latter of whom Mandela was unaware of when Verwoerd arranged the meeting. Much to her amusement, Mandela upon later seeing a large crowd cheer Brosnan was heard to remark that he must be a "famous man". During her ambassadorship, her marriage ended in divorce in 2005.

== Later in Ireland (2005–2013) ==
=== RTÉ ===
In 2005, she completed her term as ambassador and decided to remain in Ireland. She presented a weekly radio programme, Spectrum, on RTÉ Radio 1, on the theme of multiculturalism, which addressed the challenges facing the new Ireland and examined the issues that arise in a multicultural society. Verwoerd described her audience as the host of Spectrum as not being immigrant communities in Ireland, but rather a mainstream Irish audience interested in multiculturalism. Initially, the approach at Spectrum when it debuted in June 2005 was "celebratory", as the producer Aonghus McAnally described it, but starting in its second season in September 2005 the show became more "issue-driven". The first guests on Spectrum when it debuted on 4 June 2005 were The Corrs, an Irish family band that combines aspects of Celtic music with modern pop music, which reflected the "celebratory" approach. Other guests in the first season included leaders of the Muslim and Jewish communities in Ireland, who discussed what it felt like to be members of non-Christian groups in a society that until recently had dominated overwhelmingly by the values of the Catholic church. In this regard, the "celebratory" approach tended to depict Ireland in a mostly positive light. The turn towards secularism in Ireland in recent decades was portrayed as a creating an environment where Irish Jews and Irish Muslims felt more comfortable. Reflecting the turn to the "issue-driven" approach was a show aired on 18 November 2005 that featured representatives of Pavee Point, the main organisation for the Irish Travellers. Verwoerd stated in an interview: "But our remit has changed slightly in that are now asking more, not so much what is lacking as it comes up, but what is the society that we want to create in Ireland".

On 9 October 2005, Spectrum aired a show from Waterford about the case of Osagie Igbinedion, a Nigerian immigrant who in 2003 performed a botched circumcision on an infant boy who bled to death. Igbinedion was brought to trial in 2005 on charges of manslaughter and reckless endangerment of life. At his trial, the lawyers for Igbinedion argued that male circumcision was a traditional Edo practice, and the jury acquitted him. During the radio show, she interviewed Dick Spicer, the director of the Humanist Association of Ireland, and in her final interview, Verwoerd spoke with Igbinedion.

During her time as the host of Spectrum, she stated that the main issue in Ireland was not so much racism as xenophobia.

=== UNICEF ===
In April 2007, Verwoerd was appointed executive director of UNICEF Ireland. She presided over an increase in income for the organisation from €4.7 million in 2005 to €8.4 million in 2010, despite a severe recession in Ireland from 2008 onwards.

In 2007, she criticised the Garda National Immigration Bureau, stating: "Like so many other immigrants, I was treated very badly and impolitely when I had to renew my visa. And it's been very interesting because I've had floods of emails following that from people saying they've had similar and worse experiences". During her tenure she travelled extensively to UNICEF field offices, including Mozambique, Rwanda, Kenya, Swaziland, and Zimbabwe. She was involved in lobbying the Irish government to introduce new legislation to protect women from female genital mutilation and was involved in introducing a more child-friendly asylum process. In 2007, she stated her concerns about refugee children in Ireland: "I'm very concerned about that, UNICEF is very concerned about that. There are various issues -- the fact that we lose children; hundreds of unaccompanied minors have gone missing in Ireland in the last five years. The Garda know about it, the government knows about it, but very little seems to be done? How are they being followed up? How are they being looked for? You have these hostels where there isn't proper control over the children".

=== Death of Gerry Ryan and dismissal from UNICEF ===
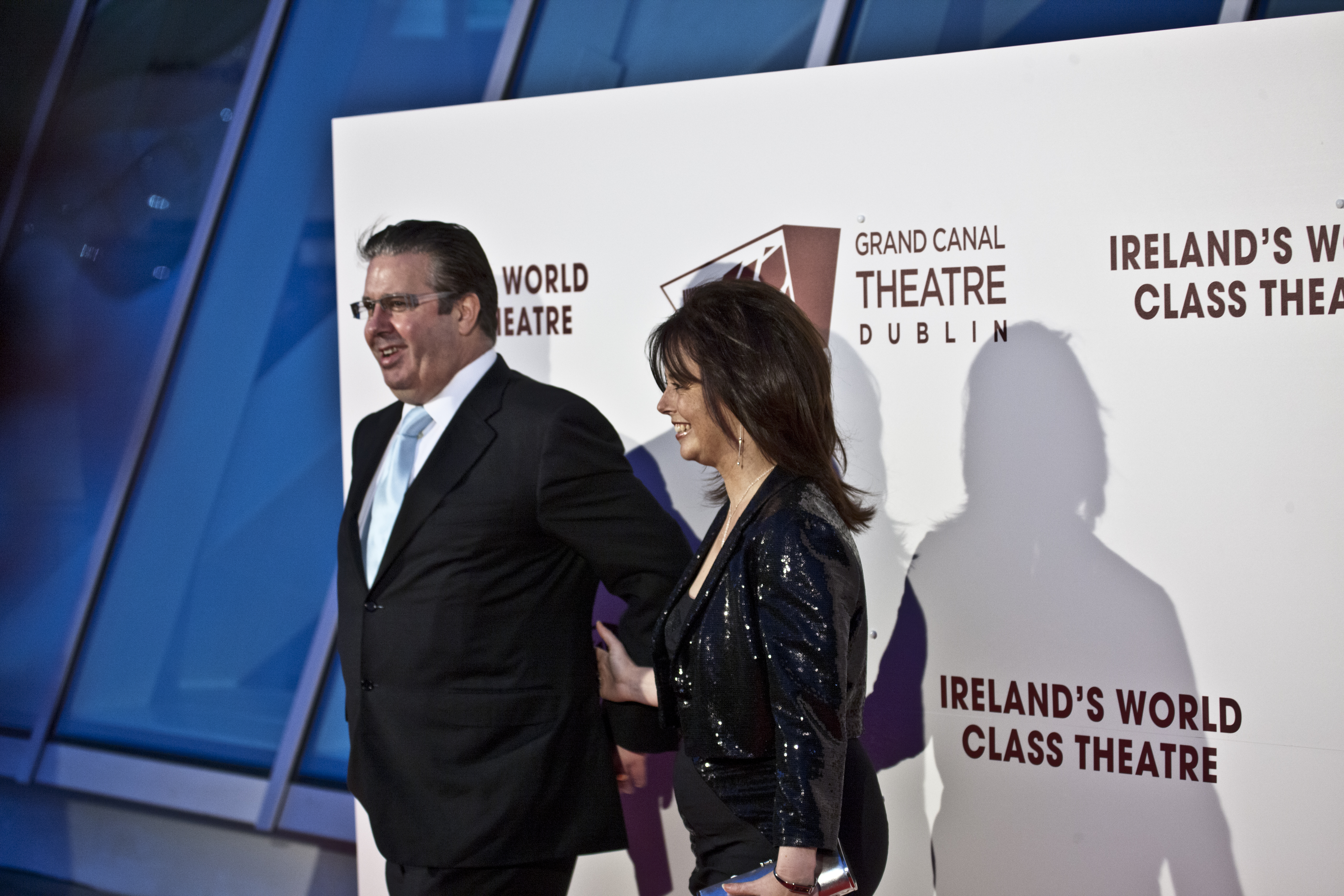
Verwoerd with her partner Gerry Ryan at the opening of the Grand Canal Theatre in March 2010

In 2008, Verwoerd became the partner of Gerry Ryan, a well-known radio and TV personality in Ireland. Ryan died suddenly on 30 April 2010, with Verwoerd finding his body.

In a 2012 interview on BBC Radio 4 with Jane Garvey, Verwoerd noted that divorce only become legal in Ireland in the 1990s, and said "there is a big discomfort and I believe a difficulty in dealing with the second partner and we were the first high-profile couple that this had happened to... [I was] the other woman. I was his new partner and it is something that Ireland is struggling with". She complained about the media coverage of her after Ryan's death, stating: "I've been watching Leveson and a lot of things rang true for me as well – having to face the media outside my door for months, my doorbell being rung, my children being hounded, etc." About the coverage of Ryan's death, largely based on what Verwoerd said were "minute traces" of cocaine in his blood, she stated: "frankly, the media destroyed him and his reputation. In my view a lot of it was just pure lies".

In July 2011, the Board of UNICEF Ireland dismissed Verwoerd, citing the media attention and its handling following the death of Ryan as the reason, and offering a substantial ex-gratia payment. This resulted in a public outcry and Verwoerd initiated unfair dismissal proceedings. Several of the goodwill ambassadors for UNICEF who were friends of Verwoerd, such as the actors Liam Neeson, Vanessa Redgrave, and Roger Moore, threatened to resign in protest over UNICEF's treatment of her. Chris Horn, who had been the chairman of UNICEF Ireland at the time that Verwoerd was hired in 2005, stated he was concerned that her sacking would damage the ability of UNICEF to keep raising money. Horn stated about Verwoerd: "She was very well qualified and as well as her personal attributes and excellent character, she was from the developing world and that made her even more attractive". UNICEF Ireland settled the case out of court in April 2013 and issued a statement stating that "her departure was in no way a reflection of her performance, which was always of the highest standards."

== Recognition ==
In 2007, Verwoerd was awarded with the Irish Tatler's International Woman of the Year award.

== Publications ==
Her memoir When We Dance was published by Liberties Press in Ireland in October 2012. It was quickly removed from sale pending a court action regarding alleged defamation. The action was set aside and the book returned to the shelves with a clarification slip being inserted into each printed copy. The book was also published in South Africa in May 2013 under the title The Verwoerd who toyi-toyied.

== Back in South Africa ==
In December 2013, she moved back to Cape Town, charging that the intense media interest in Ireland caused by her status as the former partner of Gerry Ryan had made life unbearable, stating: "I'm glad to be back here where people know me for my public life and work and not my private life. I never wanted anyone knowing about my private life. I could never have planned for what happened....The media interest in me and my personal life had become too much".

However, she stated that she misses Ireland as: "I haven't turned my back on Ireland for good. It's my second home and I miss it. I miss my friends and I even miss the rain. Even this year, I've been back several times and I will be again in the future." In 2015, she stated: "I've been back in South Africa two years now, but I shuttle [back and forth]. I miss Ireland a lot and my friends here. I love South Africa, but I really do miss Ireland. I needed to get space-I'm happy there". She holds both South African and Irish citizenship.

As of 2018 Verwoerd was residing in Cape Town and working as a political analyst, advising companies (both domestically and internationally) on political developments in South Africa and Africa. In 2018, Verwoerd was ranked one of the top two political analysts in South Africa in the Financial Mail's analyst ratings.

She had a weekly column on News24, which she left at the end of 2023.

She has conducted radio interviews for EWN, 702, and Cape Talk. As a journalist, she has been very critical of former president Jacob Zuma, whom she has accused of corruption and gross abuses of power.

== Personal life ==
In December 1987, she married Wilhelm Verwoerd. His grandfather Hendrik Verwoerd was one of South Africa's best known politicians, famous for declaring South Africa a republic on 31 May 1961 on the 49th anniversary of the Treaty of Vereeniging, which many Afrikaners took as a symbolic revenge for the Boer War. Melanie Verwoerd stated about her surname: "If you speak to Afrikaans[-speaking] white people, as a rule, they would be very, very impressed that you're a Verwoerd. When you carry a surname like Verwoerd in South Africa, you always get a reaction". Verwoerd described her father-in-law, Wilhelm Verwoerd Sr. as the typical Afrikaner takhaar (patriarch), a stern man with long white hair and an equally long white beard (symbols of wisdom in Afrikaner culture) who expected unconditional obedience from his family and for whom the ANC was a "terrorist organisation".

In 2008, Verwoerd became the partner of Gerry Ryan, a well-known radio and TV personality in Ireland. Ryan died suddenly on 30 April 2010, with Verwoerd finding his body.

In April 2020, she contracted COVID-19, which left her in a state of exhaustion as she recovered.

== Sources ==
- Fisher, Ryland (2007). Race. Johannesburg: Jacana Media. ISBN 978-1770093737.
- Goodman, David (2002). Fault Lines: Journeys Into the New South Africa. Los Angeles: University of California Press. ISBN 0520232038.
- Hutmacher MacLean, Barbara (2004). Strike a Woman, Strike a Rock: Fighting for Freedom in South Africa. Trenton, NJ: Africa World Press. ISBN 1592210767.
- Moylan, Katie (2013). Broadcasting Diversity: Migrant Representation in Irish Radio. Bristol: Intellect Books. ISBN 978-1783202256.
- Yambasu, Sahr John (2013). Between Africa and the West: A Story of Discovery. Victoria: Trafford Publishing. ISBN 978-1490709802.
