= Owendale, South Africa =

Owendale
- Location within Northern Cape Location within South Africa
- Coordinates: 28.270°S 23.418°E
- Country: South Africa
- Province: Northern Cape
- District: ZF Mgcawu
- Municipality: Kgatelopele

Area
  - Total: 32.33 km^{2} (12.48 sq mi)

Population (2011)
  - Total: 115
  - Density: 3.56/km^{2} (9.21/sq mi)

Racial makeup (2011)
  - Black African: 37.4%
  - Coloured: 20.9%
  - Indian/Asian: 2.6%
  - White: 39.1%

First languages (2011)
  - Afrikaans: 74.6%
  - Tswana: 14.0%
  - English: 7.0%
  - Xhosa: 2.6%
  - Other: 1.8%
- Time zone: UTC+2 (SAST)

Owendale is a town in Kgatelopele Local Municipality in the Northern Cape province of South Africa. It is located between Postmasburg and Daniëlskuil.

An old mining town, it was owned by Pieter du Toit from 1998 to 2006, when it was auctioned. He had reportedly bought the settlement as a base for Gemeente van die Verbondsvolk, a religious cult. Members of the congregation wished to live in an isolated village, but the dearth of available jobs led to the disintegration of the community. Asbestos mining operations had ceased in 1993.

Louis Theroux visited the town as part of his 2000 Weird Weekends documentary series, in which the town is described as being for "whites only".

== See also ==
- Morgenzon
- Balmoral, Mpumalanga
