= UNICEF Ireland =

National non-governmental organisation under UNICEF

- Abbreviation: UNICEF Ireland
- Formation: 1962
- Type: Non-governmental organisation
- Legal status: Active
- Headquarters: Dublin, Ireland
- Head: Peter Power
- Parent organization: UNICEF
- Website: unicef.ie

Unicef Ireland is one of 36 UNICEF National Committees based in industrialised countries. The National Committees raise funds for the organisation's worldwide emergency and development work. UNICEF Ireland also advises the Irish Government and other bodies on policies and legislation which support programmes and commitments under the UN Convention on the Rights of the Child.

== Nature ==
UNICEF Ireland is a registered charity.

== Goals ==
UNICEF Ireland raises funds for UNICEF's worldwide emergency and development work. It also advises the Irish Government and other bodies on policies and legislation which support programmes and commitments under the UN Convention on the Rights of the Child, working to promote the rights of children living in Ireland, regardless of race, religion or nationality.

== Activities ==
UNICEF Ireland’s first “Believe in Zero” campaign took place from 24 October-6 November 2010. During these two weeks, UNICEF Ireland's goal was to raise over €1,000,000 simply by getting every adult in Ireland to donate €1 each to UNICEF.

In 2011, UNICEF Ireland published a series of four reports that presented the findings of primary research carried out among Irish teenagers in late 2010. The First Report focuses on ‘happiness’ and explores general themes around teenage well-being throughout the country.

== Funding ==
UNICEF is not funded by the UN, instead relying on voluntary donations to fund its work for children worldwide. UNICEF Ireland raises funds for these programmes through donations, the sale of cards and gifts, partnerships with companies and special events.

=== Corporate partners ===
UNICEF is supported entirely by voluntary contributions and the support from corporate partners makes a significant contribution to its work. Companies that currently have a corporate partnership with UNICEF Ireland include Aer Lingus, Fyffes, IKEA, and Pampers.

=== Change for Good ===
In 2009, Tesco used “Change for Good” as advertising, which is trade marked by UNICEF internationally for charity usage but is not trademarked for commercial or retail use which prompted the agency to say "it is the first time in UNICEF’s history that a commercial entity has purposely set out to capitalise on one of our campaigns and subsequently damage an income stream which several of our programmes for children are dependent on”.They went on to call on the public “who have children’s welfare at heart, to consider carefully who they support when making consumer choices”.

== History ==
=== 2011 Chief Executive dismissal ===
In July 2011, former UNICEF Ireland executive director Melanie Verwoerd said she was “deeply shocked” to have been sacked from the charity because of the publicity surrounding her relationship with Gerry Ryan. Three top Hollywood stars Liam Neeson, Vanessa Redgrave and Roger Moore expressed their sadness over the dismissal. However, all three Goodwill Ambassadors are continuing to support UNICEF.

Peter Power, a former Fianna Fáil minister for Overseas Development, was appointed Executive Director in December 2011.

== UNICEF Ireland Ambassadors ==
UNICEF Ireland Ambassadors have the ability to focus the world’s attention on the needs of children, helping them to reach a wider audience, allowing them to further highlight the work they undertake to improve the lives of the most vulnerable children around the world. Activities include visiting field projects throughout the world, speaking to the media about what they have seen, or lobbying and raising money on their behalf.

UNICEF Ireland Ambassadors are Munster and Ireland rugby player Donncha O'Callaghan, Rory McIlroy, Stephen Rea, Cathy Kelly, Gaelic sports stars Joe Canning and Dermot Earley, Dustin the Turkey and Liam Neeson.

== Affiliations ==
UNICEF Ireland is a member of the Children's Rights Alliance.
