= Carel Boshoff IV =

South African politician and writer

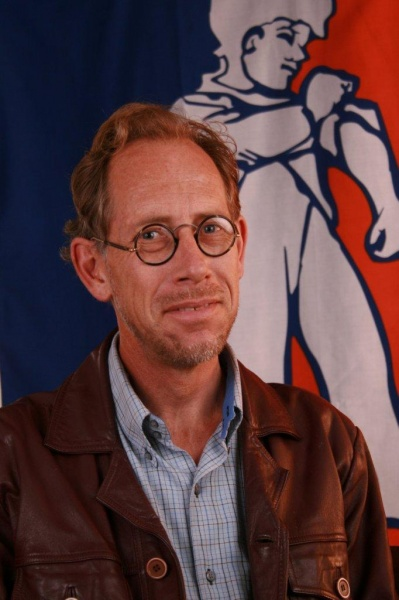
- Carel Boshoff IV in front of the flag of Orania

President of the Orania Movement
- In office 2007–2019
- Preceded by: Carel Boshoff
- Succeeded by: Joost Strydom

Personal details
- Born: Carel Willem Hendrik Boshoff; 1963 (age 62–63) Pretoria, South Africa
- Party: Freedom Front Plus
- Relations: Hendrik Verwoerd (grandfather); Betsie Verwoerd (grandmother); Wilhelm Verwoerd (cousin)
- Parents: Carel Boshoff; Anna Verwoerd
- Education: University of Pretoria
- Occupation: Leader of Orania, writer
- Known for: Leader of Orania

Carel Willem Hendrik Boshoff (usually written as Carel Boshoff IV), is a South African politician and writer known for being the leader of the Afrikaner-only town Orania.

He was also the provincial leader from 2003 to 2015 of the Freedom Front Plus party in Northern Cape province.

== Biography ==
He was born in 1963, the son of Carel Boshoff, the founder of Orania. He majored in science at the University of Pretoria, on which he had written a doctoral thesis in 1992 called "Afrikaners na Apartheid" ("Afrikaners after Apartheid"). He is the grandson of Hendrik Verwoerd.

=== Orania ===
Son of Orania's founder, he was the leader of the Orania movement from 2007 until 2019. In 2016, he became mayor of Orania but three years later, on 27 May 2019, he resigned due to corruption allegations, which he denied.

== See also ==
- Carel Boshoff
- Orania
- Freedom Front Plus
