= Divine Right =

Divine Right may refer to:

- The divine right of kings, the doctrine that a monarch derives their power directly from God
- "The Divine Right of Kings" (poem), an 1845 poem attributed to Edgar Allan Poe
- Divine Right (game), a 1979 fantasy wargame
- Divine Right: The Adventures of Max Faraday, a comic book series, 1997–1999
- Divine Right, a 1989 anthology in the Merovingen Nights series
- "Divine Right", a song on the 2004 album Hi-Fi High Lights Down Low by Lodger (Finnish band)
- The Divine Right, a 1996 play by Peter Whelan
- "Divine Right", a 1954 short story by J. T. McIntosh

== See also ==
- Divine Right's Trip, a 1972 novel by Gurney Norman
- By Divine Right, a Canadian indie rock band
- Divine law
