= Wilhelm Verwoerd =

South African academic and social activist

- Born: 21 February 1964 (age 62); Pretoria, Transvaal, South Africa
- Political party: African National Congress
- Spouses: Melanie Fourie (m. 1987; div. 2005): Sharon Layton
- Children: 2
- Relatives: Hendrik Verwoerd (grandfather); Betsie Verwoerd (grandmother); Carel Boshoff IV (cousin)
- Scientific career
- Education: Stellenbosch University; University of Oxford; University of Johannesburg
- Fields: Reconciliation and Social Justice facilitator and researcher
- Institutions: Stellenbosch University

Wilhelm Johannes Verwoerd (born 21 February 1964) is a South African facilitator and researcher based at Stellenbosch University and a social activist. The grandson of Hendrik Verwoerd, known as the architect of the apartheid regime, Verwoerd has disavowed the views with which his family is widely associated and joined the ANC.

== Early life and education ==
Born in Pretoria to Wilhelm and Elise (née Smit) Verwoerd on 21 February 1964, Wilhelm is a member of a prominent Afrikaner family. His grandfather was South African Prime Minister Hendrik Verwoerd. Although raised in a family and environment that frowned on racial integration, he changed his stance on apartheid after studying in the Netherlands and at Oxford University.

He holds an MA in Philosophy from Stellenbosch University in 1989, an Oxford MA automatically awarded after reading for a BA in PPE from the University of Oxford and a PhD in Applied Ethics from the University of Johannesburg.

== Academic career and later life ==
Verwoerd's research focuses largely on reconciliation, forgiveness and apology, on which he has written several articles. He was a researcher in the Truth and Reconciliation Commission. He worked as a programme co-ordinator and a co-facilitator in Ireland, within the Glencree Centre for Peace and Reconciliation's Survivors and former Combatants Programme between 2002 and 2011. He is a former co-director of Beyond Walls Ltd. From 2019, he has been a senior researcher and facilitator within Studies in Historical Trauma and Transformation, Stellenbosch University.

In 1992, Verwoerd formally joined the ANC, which drew a lot of criticism and threats from militant Afrikaners, given his family roots. This brought strife with his own family.

== Personal life ==
Verwoerd married Melanie van Niekerk in 1987, with whom he had two children. They divorced in 2005. Wilhelm later married his second wife Sharon, who is Australian.

== Select publications ==
=== Books ===
- Wilhelm Verwoerd (1996). Viva Verwoerd?: kronieke van 'n keuse. Human & Rousseau.
- Wilhelm Verwoerd (2018). Bloedbande: 'n Donker tuiskoms. Tafelberg.
- Wilhelm Verwoerd (2019). Verwoerd: My Journey through Family Betrayals. Tafelberg.

=== Edited books ===
- Wilhelm Verwoerd; Charles Villa-Vicencio, eds. (2000). Looking Back Reaching Forward: Reflections on the Truth and Reconciliation Commission of South Africa. Zed Books. p. 344. ISBN 9781856498197.

=== Journal articles ===
- Trudy Govier; Wilhelm Verwoerd (2002). "The Promise and Pitfalls of Apology". Journal of Social Philosophy. 33: 67–82. doi:10.1111/1467-9833.00124.
- Trudy Govier; Wilhelm Verwoerd (2002). "Trust and the Problem of National Reconciliation". Philosophy of the Social Sciences. 32 (2): 178–205. doi:10.1177/004931032002003. S2CID 144842016.
- Trudy Govier; Wilhelm Verwoerd (2002). "Forgiveness: The Victim's Prerogative". South African Journal of Philosophy. 21 (2): 97–111. doi:10.4314/sajpem.v21i2.31338. S2CID 145532990.
