= Carel Boshoff =

Afrikaner nationalist and founder of Orania (1927–2011)

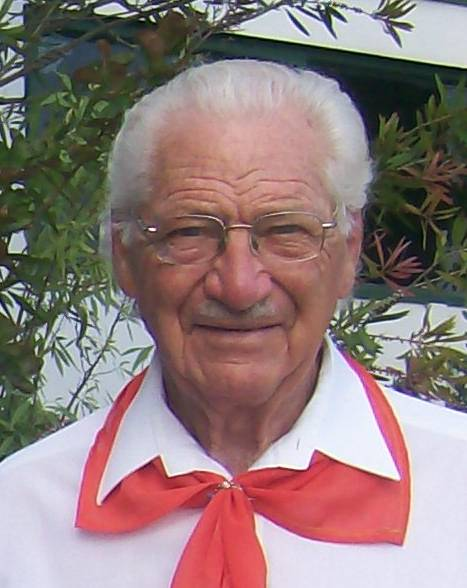
- Carel Boshoff (2009)

Chairman of the Afrikaner Broederbond
- In office 1980–1983
- Preceded by: Viljoen, G.
- Succeeded by: de Lange, J.P.

President of the Orania Movement
- In office 1990–2007
- Preceded by: Office established
- Succeeded by: Carel Boshoff IV

Personal details
- Born: Carel Willem Hendrik Boshoff; 9 November 1927 Nylstroom, Transvaal, South Africa
- Died: 16 March 2011 (aged 83) Orania, Northern Cape, South Africa
- Party: Freedom Front Plus (1994–2011)
- Other political affiliations: National (Before 1983); Conservative (1983–1994)
- Spouse: Anna Verwoerd (m. 1954; died 2007)
- Children: 7, including Carel Boshoff IV
- Education: University of Pretoria
- Occupation: Lecturer
- Known for: Calvinism, Afrikaner Nationalism, Volkstaat, Founder of Orania

Carel Willem Hendrik Boshoff (9 November 1927 – 16 March 2011) was a South African professor of theology and Afrikaner nationalist.

== Biography ==
Boshoff was born in Nylstroom in the Transvaal Province as the second child of Willem Sterrenberg Boshoff and Anna Maria "Annie" Boshoff. Boshoff's mother, Anna, was the second wife of his father; together they had seven children in addition to the six from his father's first marriage. Boshoff spent much of his youth at his father's ranch in the Waterberg District in the northern Transvaal, attended the University of Pretoria and attained his doctorate in theology in 1951 after doing missionary work throughout the old Transvaal Province. He spoke the Sepedi (Northern Sotho) language fluently and served as Secretary of Missions for the Dutch Reformed Church.

Boshoff's wife (also named Anna), whom he married in 1954, was the daughter of Hendrik Verwoerd who served as prime minister of South Africa (1958–1966) and became known as the architect of apartheid. They had seven children; she died in 2007. Boshoff led the Voortrekker movement from 1981 to 1989. Further, he served as chairman of the Afrikaner Broederbond from 1980 to 1983. He had to leave the Broederbond in 1983, when members of the newly formed Conservative Party were not welcome any more. He chaired the Freedom Front in Northern Cape from 1994.

Boshoff established the Afrikaner Volkswag in May 1984 with the ostensible purpose of defending Afrikaner culture, although in practice it was mainly involved in opposing the liberalising of some racial laws under P.W. Botha. Boshoff had attempted to affiliate his group to the Federasie van Afrikaanse Kultuurvereniginge soon after its foundation but the application was rejected due to the political nature of the Volkswag. The following year he was involved in the setting up of the Vereniging Bybel en Volk, an opposition group within the Reformed Churches in South Africa established after the church leadership endorsed a motion of condemnation of apartheid passed by the Reformed Ecumenical Synod.

In 1988 he founded AVSTIG or Afrikaner Vryheidstigting, although he is mainly known as the founder in 1990 of Orania, an Afrikaner settlement intended as the beginning of a Volkstaat. Boshoff admitted his disappointment that Orania had only 810 residents rather than the 60,000 he had anticipated. In 2004 Orania issued its own currency, the Ora. The area is noted for its Koeksister monument. Boshoff was the president of the Orania movement ('Orania beweging') until 2007. After he became disabled due to illness, his son, Carel Boshoff IV, took over all the above positions.

== Death ==
Boshoff died aged 83 from cancer at his home on 16 March 2011.

== Chairmanships ==
Position	Organisation	Appointed	Concluded
Chair	Orania Representative Council	2000	2006
Chair	Orania Bestuurdienste (Pty) Ltd	1990	
Executive Chair	Afrikaner Vryheidstigting / Orania Movement	1988	
Chair	Afrikaanse Gereformeerde Bond	1987	
Chair	Die Afrikaner Volkswag (Cultural Organisation)	1984	1999
Chair	Die Afrikaner Broederbond	1979	1983
Founder & Chair	Institute for Missiological Research, UP	1979	1988
Chair	South African Bureau for Racial Affairs	1972	1999
Member	Council Rand College of Education	1963	1979
Chair	NG Kerkboekhandel		1988

== See also ==
- Carel Boshoff IV
- Orania, Northern Cape
- Freedom Front Plus
