= Transitional representative council (South Africa) =

Administrative division, 1994–2000

- Also known as: Verteenwoordigende oorgangsraad
- Category: Provinces of South Africa
- Location: Republic of South Africa
- Found in: District council
- Created by: Local Government Transition Act with Election Regulations 209 of 1993
- Created: 27 April 1994
- Abolished by: Municipal Structures Act 117 of 1998; Municipal Systems Act 32 of 2000
- Abolished: 5 December 2000 (except for 1 council)
- Number: 1 (as of 2021)
- Possible status: municipality
- Government: Representative council
- Subdivisions: None

A transitional representative council (Afrikaans: Verteenwoordigende oorgangsraad) is a local administrative division in South Africa. Between 1994 and 2000 it was the default type of municipal government for small and rural communities. After apartheid these transitional councils were created as a provisional local representation until the formation of a more final municipal structure. Due to the implementation of a municipal system in 2000, all transitional councils, barring Orania, were abolished and their areas were merged into the new municipalities.

== Background ==
During apartheid, local government was split between different racial and cultural groups. The result was a very scattered governmental landscape at the local level. To induce the integration of these entities, the transitional councils were established. Therefore, the transitional councils were a composition of representatives of all existing local government bodies, including former black local authorities, former (white) local councils, boards of rural areas, committees for local affairs, regional service councils, joint service boards, joint-decision making bodies, joint local authorities, other official local authorities and persons, institutions or bodies with local government powers i.e. private towns and mining towns.

When the Local Government Transition Act with Election Regulations 209 of 1993 was approved by parliament, the act made provision for different types of transitional councils for local government: transitional metropolitan councils, transitional local councils for other urban areas, transitional rural councils and transitional representative councils. The act, however, was amended before the act was implemented. The foreseen transitional rural councils became transitional representative councils.

== Administrative powers ==
Transitional representative councils were the default type of local government for small and rural communities. Of all the transitional councils it had the fewest responsibilities. In contrast to the transitional metropolitan councils and the transitional local councils, the transitional representative councils were not directly responsible for service delivery. Within the area of transitional representative councils service delivery was a duty of the district councils (the former regional services councils).

=== Main powers and duties ===
The main powers and duties of the transitional representative councils were:

- to elect from among its members person(s) to sit on the district council;
- to secure from the district council the best services possible for its area;
- to serve as a representative body for the area additional powers and duties as identified by the MEC, or as conferred, imposed, delegated or assigned, under any law.

== Elections ==
First, the representatives sitting in the transitional representative councils were representatives of existing local bodies. As in an indirect election system, a representative could be replaced after elections for these local bodies. Later, direct elections for the transitional councils were held during the South African municipal elections of 1995–96.

== Abolition ==
In the process to a new municipal structure, the transitional representative councils were the basis of the merger. During the process they were consulted by the Municipal Demarcation Board. In late 1999 it became clear what transitional representative councils - with their local bodies - would merge into one municipality. In all cases - except one - the provincial governments, the municipal demarcation board and the transitional representative councils could reach agreements about the merger into and the foundation of new municipalities. After these agreements the abolition of each transitional representative council was published in the provincial government gazettes. The abolition of the transitional representative councils effectively took place at 5 December 2000, during the South African municipal elections of 2000.

=== Orania ===
In the case of the Afrikaner-town of Orania, the abolition of the Orania Transitional Representative Council never was published in the provincial government gazette of the Northern Cape. The Orania Transitional Representative Council also objected to a proposed merger with Hopetown and Strydenburg. After the provincial government of the Northern Cape published a rectification in its government gazette, the Orania Transitional Representative Council went to court. This lawsuit was handled by the Northern Cape High Court on 4 December 2000, one day before the nationwide local elections. In the light of the mistake of the Northern Cape government to not publish the abolition of the Orania Transitional Representative Council it was very likely that Orania would win the case, with the possible result that the High Court could cancel the elections scheduled for the next day.

Therefore, the case was settled between Orania and the South African government. They agreed that the Orania Transitional Representative Council will remain in place indefinitely with all its powers, rights and duties until there is an agreement about the municipal status of Orania. This agreement was affirmed by the Northern Cape High Court that same day.

== See also ==
- Administrative divisions of South Africa
