= Volkstaat =

Proposed state for Afrikaners of South Africa

"Vryheidsvlag" or "Freedom flag", the most common proposed flag for an Afrikaner homeland or Volkstaat. Also used to represent Afrikaners at the UNPO.

Versions of the flag of South Africa from 1928 to 1994 without the Union Jack are occasionally proposed as a flag for an Afrikaner homeland or Volkstaat (this version replacing the Union Jack with the "Vryheidsvlag").

A Volkstaat (Afrikaans pronunciation: [ˈfɔlkstɑːt], lit. 'People's State'), also called a Boerestaat, is a proposed White homeland for Boers and Afrikaners within the borders of South Africa, most commonly proposed as a fully independent Boer/Afrikaner nation. The proposed state would exclude Afrikaans-speaking Coloureds but could allow English-speaking White South Africans and other White South Africans to settle into the Afrikaner homeland if they accept Afrikaner culture and customs.

Following the Great Trek of the 1830s and 1840s, Boer colonists established several Boer republics over the rest of the 19th century. The end of apartheid and the establishment of universal suffrage in South Africa in 1994 left some Afrikaners feeling disillusioned by the political changes, which resulted in a proposal for an independent Volkstaat.

Several different methods have been proposed for the establishment of a Volkstaat. The geographic dispersal of minority Afrikaner communities throughout South Africa presents a significant obstacle to the establishment of a Volkstaat, because Afrikaners do not form a majority in any separate geographic area that could be sustainable independently. Supporters of the proposal have established several land cooperatives in Orania in the Northern Cape province and Kleinfontein in Gauteng as practical implementations of the idea. Initiatives in Balmoral and Morgenzon, both in Mpumalanga, failed to develop beyond their initial phase.

Map of Volkstaat as historically proposed and supported by the Freedom Front Plus.

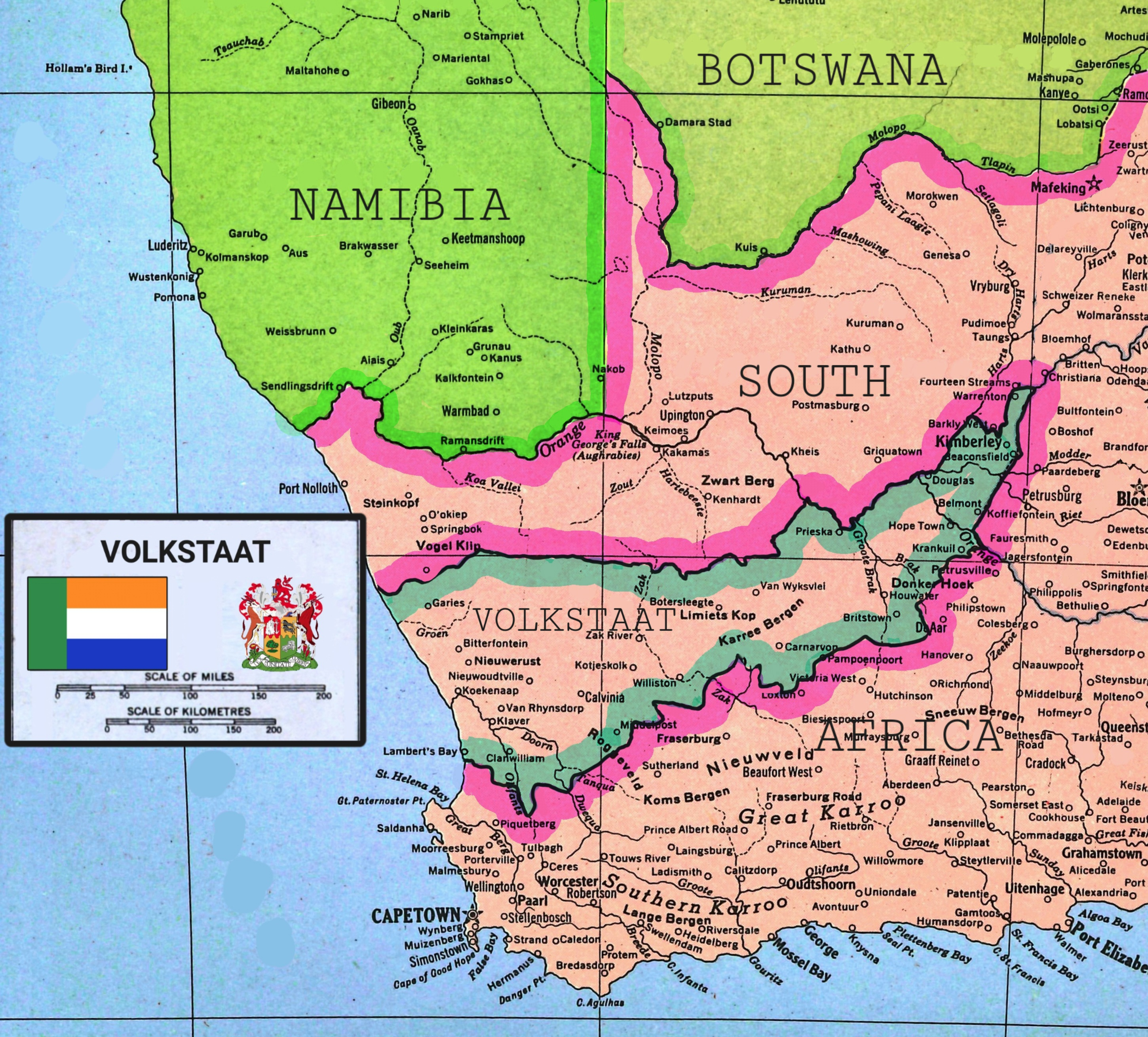
Map of proposed Volkstaat and neighbouring countries. Similar to the FF+ proposal, but stretches to Kimberley.

== History ==
Historically, Boers have exhibited a drive for independence which resulted in the establishment of several Boer republics in modern-day South Africa. Voortrekkers proclaimed separate independent republics, most notably the Natalia Republic, Orange Free State and South African Republic. However, during the Second Boer War, British forces occupied the Orange Free State and South African Republic, which were subsequently incorporated into the Cape Colony.

Under apartheid, the South African government promoted Afrikaner culture; though both Afrikaans and English were the official languages, the majority of the politicians running the country were Afrikaners. The underlying principle of apartheid was racial separatism, and the means by which this was implemented, such as the homeland system of bantustans, were biased against the non-European majority as they excluded them from exercising their rights in the broader South Africa.

In the 1980s, a group of Afrikaners, led by HF Verwoerd's son-in-law, formed a group called the Oranjewerkers. They also planned a community based on "Afrikaner self-determination", and attempted to create a neo-"boerstaat" (literally: "Boer State," a reference to an idiomatic term for an Afrikaner-only state) in the remote Eastern Transvaal (now Mpumalanga) community of Morgenzon.

In 1988, Professor Carel Boshoff (1927-2011) founded the Afrikaner-Vryheidstigting (Afrikaner Freedom Foundation), or Avstig. Avstig proposed a Volkstaat in the Northern Cape province, in a largely rural and minimally developed region. Avstig bought the town of Orania in 1991, and turned it into a model Volkstaat. Boshoff continued to be a representative of the Freedom Front, a political party which advocated the Volkstaat concept. Orania lies at the far eastern apex of the original Volkstaat state, near where the boundaries of the three provinces Northern Cape, Eastern Cape, and Free State meet.

== Support and opposition ==
=== Freedom Front in the 1994 general election ===
During the 1994 general election, Afrikaners were asked by the Freedom Front (FF) to vote for the party if they wished to form an independent state or Volkstaat for Afrikaners. The results of the election showed that the Freedom Front had the support of 424,555 voters, the fourth highest in the country. The FF did not however gain a majority in any of South Africa's voting districts, their closest being 4,692 votes in Phalaborwa, representing 30.38% of that district.

=== Public opinion surveys of white South Africans ===
Two surveys were conducted among white South Africans, in 1993 and 1996, asking the question "How do you feel about demarcating an area for Afrikaners and other "European" South Africans in which they may enjoy self determination? Do you support the idea of a Volkstaat?" The 1993 survey found that 29% supported the idea, and a further 18% would consider moving to a Volkstaat. The 1996 survey found that this had decreased to 22% supporting the idea, and only 9% wanting to move to a Volkstaat. In the second survey, the proportion of white South Africans opposed to the idea had increased from 34% to 66%.

The 1996 survey found that "those who in 1996 said that they would consider moving to a Volkstaat are mainly Afrikaans speaking males, who are supporters of the Conservative Party or Afrikaner Freedom Front, hold racist views (24%; slightly racist: 6%, non racist: 0%), call themselves Afrikaners and are not content with the new democratic South Africa." The study used the Duckitt scale of subtle racism to measure racist views.

A 1999 pre-election survey suggested that the 26.9% of Afrikaners wanting to emigrate, but unable to, represented a desire for a solution such as a Volkstaat.

In January 2010, Beeld, an Afrikaans newspaper, held an online survey. Out of 11,019 respondents, 56% (6,178) said that they would move to a Volkstaat if one were created, a further 17% (1,908) would consider it while only 27% (2,933) would not consider it as a viable option. The newspaper's analysis of this was that the idea of a Volkstaat was doodgebore (stillborn) and that its advocates had been doing nothing but tread water for the past two decades, although it did suggest that the poll was a measure of dissatisfaction among Afrikaners. Hermann Giliomee later cited the Beeld poll in saying that over half of "northern Afrikaners" would prefer to live in a homeland.

=== Issues creating support ===
Dissatisfaction with life in post-apartheid South Africa is often cited as an indication of support for the idea of a Volkstaat among Afrikaners. A poll carried out by the Volkstaat Council among white people in Pretoria identified crime, economic problems, personal security, affirmative action, educational standards, population growth, health services, language and cultural rights, and housing as reasons to support the creation of Volkstaat.

In an interview with Global Politician, Volkstaat Council Chair Johann Wingard cited what he described as rising unemployment, reduced political representation for whites Afrikaners, and dangers to white Afrikaner cultural heritage as motivations for the creation of a Volkstaat. However, white people in South Africa have the lowest unemployment rate of all racial groups in South Africa.

== Notable Volkstaat movements ==
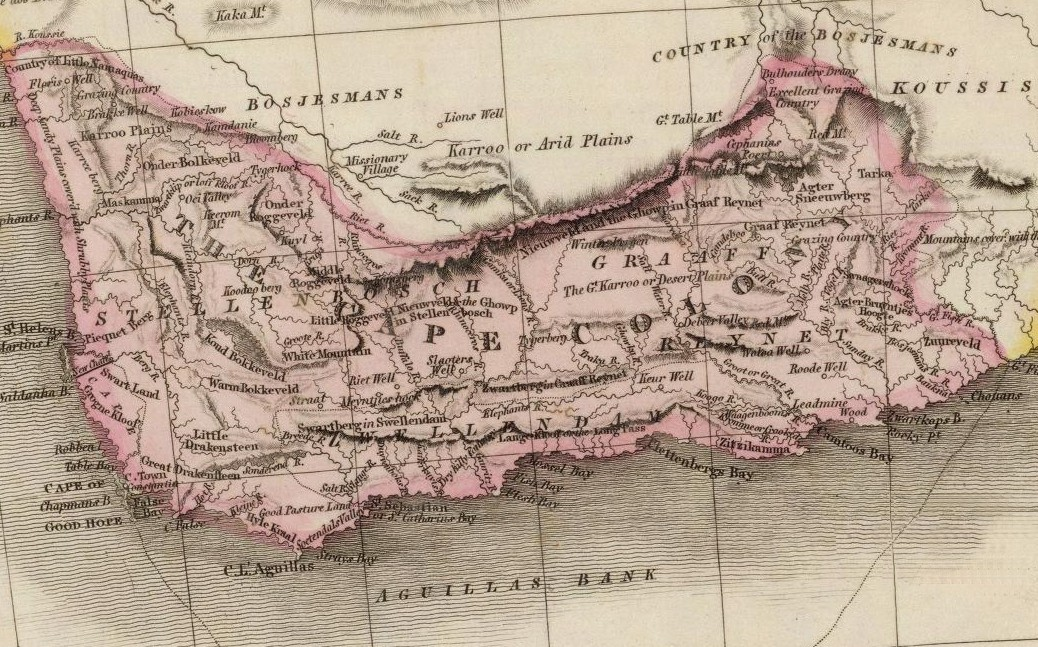
Map of the Cape Colony (now Western Cape) in 1809.

Freedom Front Plus

The Freedom Front has been the major political driving force for the formation of a Volkstaat. This Afrikaner-focused political party has representation in the national Parliament as well as several Provincial legislatures in South Africa. Support for this party however decreased to just under 140,000 votes, being less than 1% of the total votes cast (approximately 20% among registered Afrikaner voters) by the 2004 national elections. The Freedom Front advocates following the Belgium, Canada and Spain models of granting territorial autonomy to linguistic minorities, believing it the only way to protect the rights of Afrikaner people. Under this policy, they proposed that a mostly uninhabited chunk of land in the Western Cape and Northern Cape, stretching from the Atlantic Ocean near Vredendal, to the Orange River at Orania, would be developed into an Afrikaner homeland. As of 2024, the FF+ no longer explicitly supports the creation of a Volkstaat, but it does support Cape Independence, which is often seen as a separatist movement for Afrikaans speakers at large (rather than exclusively Afrikaners).

Afrikaner Resistance Movement

The Afrikaner Weerstandsbeweging made headlines in March 2008 for their re-activation and plans of establishing an independent Boer state. Plans include a demand for land, such as Stellaland and Goshen, that they claim is legally theirs in terms of the Sand River Convention of 1852 and other historical treaties, through the International Court of Justice in The Hague if necessary. The Front National also called for the re-establishment of Stellaland as possible Volkstaat.

Boeremag

Die Boeremag (The Farmer-Might) advocated for a violent overthrow of the African National Congress government and sought to restore apartheid-era policies and create a separate homeland for Afrikaners. Most of its members were arrested in 2003, and are facing charges of treason. Similar violent methods towards Volkstaat creation were employed by the Orde van die Dood in the 1980s.

Proportion of white South Africans in the population. The inequal distribution of whites hampers the formation of a territorial connected Volkstaat.

Predominant language of white South Africans. English (red) is spoken in the Eastern Cape, KwaZulu-Natal and the cities, while Afrikaans (blue) is spoken in rural areas.

== Governmental response ==
Penuell Maduna, one of the leading ANC negotiators during the transition era, noted that Afrikaner organizations could not agree on the borders of the new Volkstaat. He noted a proposal to create a Volkstaat that would stretch from majority-white neighborhoods in Pretoria to the Atlantic Ocean, which was seen as unacceptable by the ANC.

On 5 June 1998, Mohammed Valli Moosa (then minister of constitutional development in the African National Congress (ANC) government) stated during a parliamentary budget debate that "the ideal of some Afrikaners to develop the North Western Cape as a home for the Afrikaner culture and language within the framework of the Constitution and the charter of human rights is viewed by the government as a legitimate ideal."

On 23 July 2014, members of an Afrikaner group who call themselves the "Boer-Afrikaner Volksraad" announced forthcoming talks with the South African government around the concept of territorial self-determination for "Boer Afrikaner people". The talks would include either President Jacob Zuma, his deputy Cyril Ramaphosa, or both; and would be held before the end of August 2014.

== Implementations ==
There have been several notable attempts at a practical implementation of a Volkstaat.

=== Orania ===
One Volkstaat attempt is the small town of Orania in the Northern Cape province. The land on which Orania is built is privately owned. It had a population of 519 in 2001, 10 years after being established. Today, Orania is home to about 3,000 Afrikaners but has approximately 7,000 'uitwoners' or 'outhabitants' who are part of the Orania Movement. Moving to Orania requires an application. Orania is currently petitioning the government to become a separate municipality and in the meantime their (transitional) representative council will remain in place indefinitely with all its powers, rights and duties.

=== Kleinfontein ===
Another attempt is the settlement of Kleinfontein outside Pretoria (in the Tshwane metropolitan area). Similar to Orania, Kleinfontein was built on private property. Kleinfontein falls within the metropolitan area of Tshwane. In 2013 Tshwane recognized Kleinfontein as cultural community. Members of the African National Congress and Democratic Alliance have denounced the settlement and the continued existence of white-only settlements in post-apartheid South Africa.

Kleinfontein currently has a population of around 650.

=== Balmoral and Morgenzon ===
Two other notable Volkstaat attempts occurred in the Mpumalanga province, but both failed to develop beyond their initial phase. The first was at Balmoral, at the site of a former concentration camp built during the Second Boer War. The effort at Balmoral was financed by American white supremacist politician David Duke. Prominent right-winger Willem Ratte owns a farm in Balmoral.

Meanwhile, Morgenzon was the site of another failed attempt to set up a Volkstaat in the 1990s. The idea originated in the early 1980s, when Hendrik Verwoerd Jr, son of the former prime minister Hendrik Verwoerd, moved to Morgenzon along with a group known as Oranjewerkers.

Ultimately only 20 families followed him, as his plans required them to give up their black servants and labourers, and most of Morgenzon's whites were reluctant to perform the menial tasks that were otherwise reserved for blacks.

== Legal basis ==
Section 235 of the South African Constitution allows for the right to self-determination of a community, within the framework of "the right of the South African people as a whole to self-determination", and pursuant to national legislation. This section of the constitution was one of the negotiated settlements during the handing over of political power in 1994. The Freedom Front was instrumental in including this section in the constitution. No national legislation in this regard has yet been enacted for any ethnic group, however.

International law presents a possible recourse for the establishment of a Volkstaat over and above than what the South African Constitution offers. This is available to all minorities who wish to obtain self-determination in the form of independence. The requirements set by international law are explained by Prof C. Lloyd Brown-John of the University of Windsor (Canada), as follows: "A minority who are geographically separate and who are distinct ethnically and culturally and who have been placed in a position of subordination may have a right to secede. That right, however, could only be exercised if there is a clear denial of political, linguistic, cultural and religious rights." However, Afrikaner nationalists who have brought cases to the UN claiming indigenous status were rejected in 1996 and 2005 on the grounds that Afrikaners were neither marginalised or discriminated against. The rights awarded to minorities were formally asserted by the United Nations General Assembly when it adopted resolution 47/135 on 18 December 1992.

== See also ==
- White genocide conspiracy theory
- Volkstaat Council
- Afrikaner nationalism
- Cape Independence
- Cape Party
- Unrepresented Nations and Peoples Organization
- Self-determination
- Conservative Party (South Africa)
- National Conservative Party of South Africa
- White ethnostate
- Referendum Party
- White flight
