= Afrikaner nationalism =

Political ideology in South Africa

Afrikaner nationalism (Afrikaans: Afrikanernasionalisme) is an ethnic nationalistic political ideology created by Afrikaners residing in Southern Africa. The ideology was developed during the Victorian era in response to the significant events in Afrikaner history such as the Great Trek, the First and Second Boer Wars and the resulting anti-British sentiment and Anti-communism that developed among Afrikaners and opposition to South Africa's entry into World War I.

According to historian T. Dunbar Moodie, Afrikaner nationalism could be described as a civil religion that drew upon the Afrikaner people's history, the defence of the Afrikaans language, republicanism, and Afrikaner Calvinism. A major proponent of the ideology was the Broederbond secret society and the National Party that ruled the country from 1948 to 1994. Other Afrikaner nationalist organisations included the Federation of Afrikaans Cultural Organisations (Afrikaans: Federasie van Afrikaanse Kultuurvereniginge, FAK), the Institute for Christian National Education, and the White Workers' Protection Association.

== Formulating the ideology ==
One of the first champions of Afrikaner nationalism was Stephanus Jacobus du Toit (1847–1911) an ordained minister of the Dutch Reformed Church. In his writings, Du Toit put forward the notion that Afrikaners were a distinct nationality with a fatherland (South Africa) and their own language (Afrikaans) and that the destiny of the volk was to rule South Africa. He started the Afrikaans-language newspaper Die Afrikaanse Patriot in 1876 and became one of the founding members of the political party the Afrikaner Bond in 1881.

=== Dutch Reformed Church ===
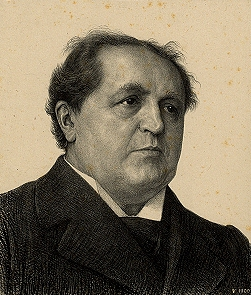
Abraham Kuyper, the Dutch neo-Calvinist theologian

Religion, especially Afrikaner Calvinism (a form of Protestantism), played an instrumental role in the development of Afrikaner nationalism and consequently in the apartheid ideology. The Dutch Reformed Churches of South Africa engaged throughout the 18th century in a constant battle against modernism and modernity. They aligned with the conservative views of Abraham Kuyper (1837–1920), who emphasised God's authority over separate spheres of creation. Such spheres (for example: historical nations) had to be preserved and protected from liberalism and revolutionary ideologies. Kuyper also rejected the Enlightenment with its emphasis on human rationality and individuality and thought that it had led to the ideals of equality, fraternity and freedom of the French Revolution. In his view, all these ideas challenged God's authority. Afrikaner theologians worked from this foundation and defined a number of political, economic and cultural spheres that had their separate, independent destinies. Afrikaner history was also reinterpreted through a Christian-nationalistic ideology. Paul Kruger, president of the Transvaal from 1883 to 1902 and a founding member of the Gereformeerde Kerke van Zuid-Afrika or "Dopper Church", referred to a "sacred history" with the volk as the chosen people, where the Great Trek of the 1830s was seen as the Exodus from British rule in the Cape to the Promised Land of the Boer Republics.

=== Secular Afrikaner nationalism ===
During the 1930s and 1940s, many intellectuals participated in the theoretical formulation of Afrikaner nationalism. Nicolaas Johannes Diederichs (who would later become South Africa's president in 1975) formulated Afrikaner nationalistic ideology in his 1936 book "Nationalism as a Worldview and Its Relationship to Internationalism" through Kuyperian theology. According to Diederichs, God created nations, and these nations had a God-ordained right to exist as separate entities. Therefore, Afrikaners could refuse a "British-designed" South Africa in which they would co-exist with other ethnic groups as a minority. Geoffrey Cronjé developed these ideas further and argued that as long as the Afrikaner existed as a racial and cultural minority, they could not allow the Black majority to develop economically or politically, since this would lead to Black domination. He acknowledged this as unjust and unchristian and as a solution offered total segregation, that is apartheid, between the Blacks and the whites.

The Afrikaner nationalist intelligentsia, along with the National Party and the Broederbond, ended up formulating a radical nationalistic policy which rejected British hegemony in economics and politics, as well as ethnic mengelmoes ("mess") induced by the transportation of Black migrant workers around the country. They proposed as a solution the drastic reordering of the South African demographic map with a dominant Afrikaner Republic not influenced by British imperialism. However, because of the opposition of the urban middle class, they did not propose a return to conservative, pre-modern Boer pastoralism.

=== Afrikaner nationalism and race ===
Initially during the 19th century the position of the Dutch Reformed Church on the nationalist issue was more pragmatic than ideological and for example, in South Africa, the church viewed segregation as a harmonious way of administering a heterogeneous community. The economic depression in South Africa between 1905 and 1909 changed this attitude when a new group of "poor whites", mostly Afrikaners, emerged. By 1939 racial segregation had become a church dogma:

"The policy of segregation as advocated by the Afrikaner and his church is the holy calling of the Church to see to the thousands of poor whites in the cities who fight a losing battle in the present economic world... The application of segregation will furthermore lead to the creation of separate healthy cities for the non-whites where they will be in a position to develop along their own lines, establish their own institutions and later on govern themselves under the guardianship of the whites"

The Afrikaner state as a Christian civilisation thus had an alleged divine right to stay separate and to rule the surrounding "heathen" nations.

=== Afrikaner nationalism and Nazism ===
Afrikaner nationalism and Nazism had common roots in religio-nationalism and in Pan-Germanism, and therefore the racist elements of both movements could assimilate. As such, Afrikaner criticism of the capitalistic system in the inter-war period was often anti-Semitic. Many Afrikaner nationalists also viewed a strong government on Nazi-German lines as necessary to protect the nation. Just before and during World War II (1939–1945), these sentiments led to the appearance of a number of pro-Nazi Afrikaner nationalistic organisations, such as the Ossewabrandwag (founded in February 1939) and its paramilitary wing Stormjaers. After resigning due to his adamant opposition to war against Nazi Germany, former South African prime minister J. B. M. Hertzog released a statement in which he openly and explicitly praised Nazism. He said South Africa needed to become a fascist dictatorship.

== Afrikaner nationalistic politics ==
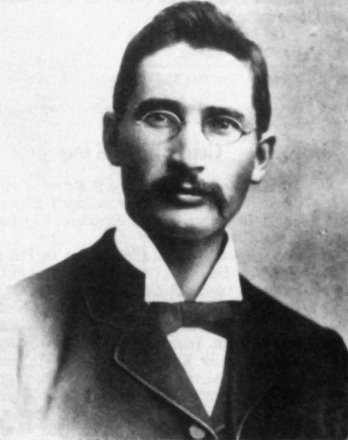
James Barry Munnik Hertzog, an Afrikaner politician who became South African prime minister

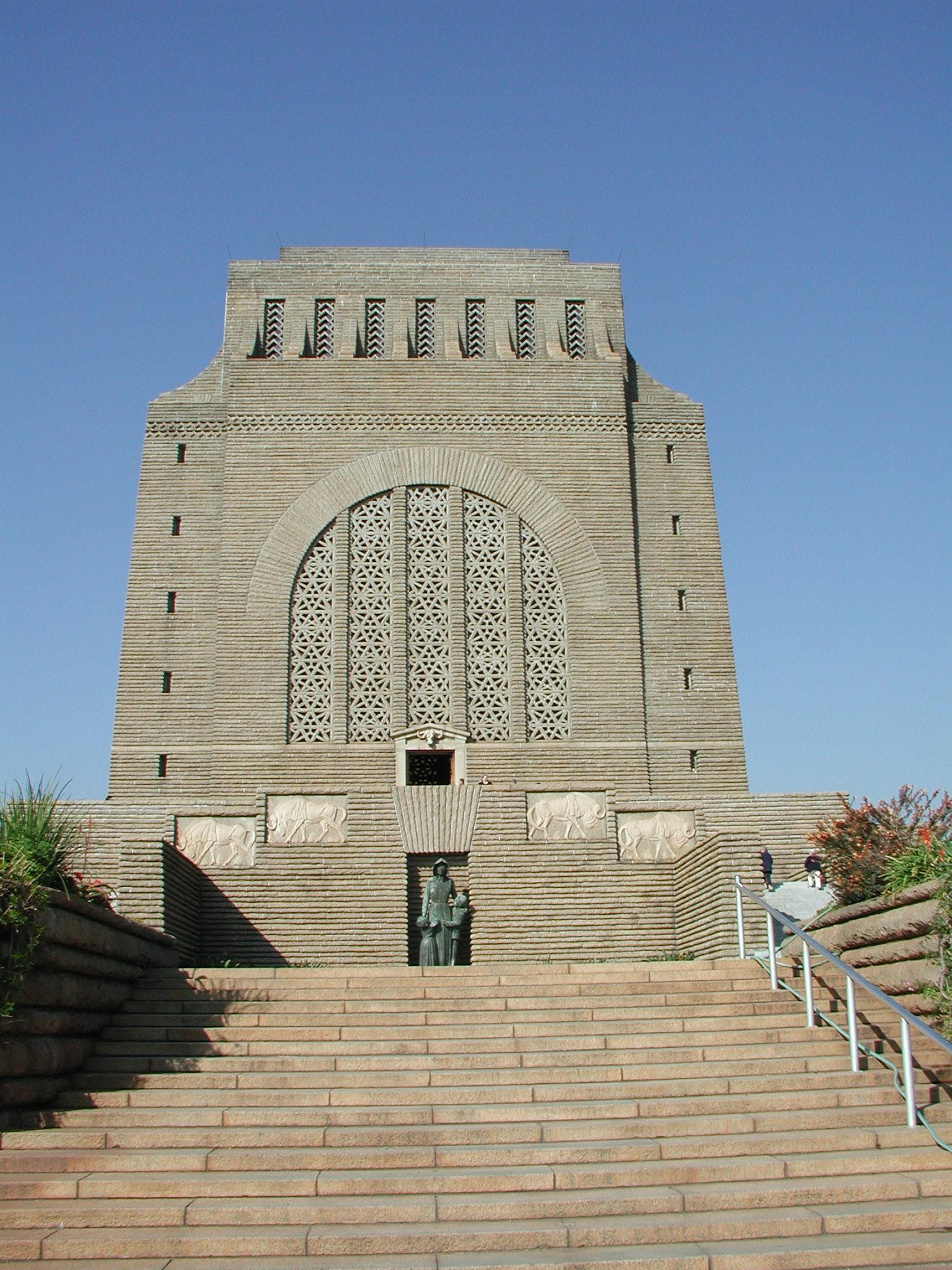
Voortrekker Monument, Afrikaner nationalistic monument in honour of the people that took part in the Great Trek. The architect Gerard Moerdijk described it as a "monument that would stand thousands of years to describe the history and the meaning of the Great Trek to its descendants".

The Union of South Africa's entry into World War I on the side of the Allies, automatically undertaken as an extension of the British entry into the war, aroused Afrikaner nationalist resentment due to recent memories of the South African War. After the repression of the Maritz rebellion against the government, J. B. M. Hertzog founded the National Party as an Afrikaner nationalist party. Hertzog led the National Party the 1915 and 1920 elections under the slogan "South Africa first" to create a South Africa independent from the British influence. In the 1924 elections he defeated the South African Party led by Jan Smuts, after Smuts had used force to end the Rand Revolt of white miners in 1922, and stayed in power for 15 years in a coalition government with the Labour Party. During his reign, he steadily promoted Afrikaner nationalism while deepening the racial segregation in the country.

=== Broederbond ===
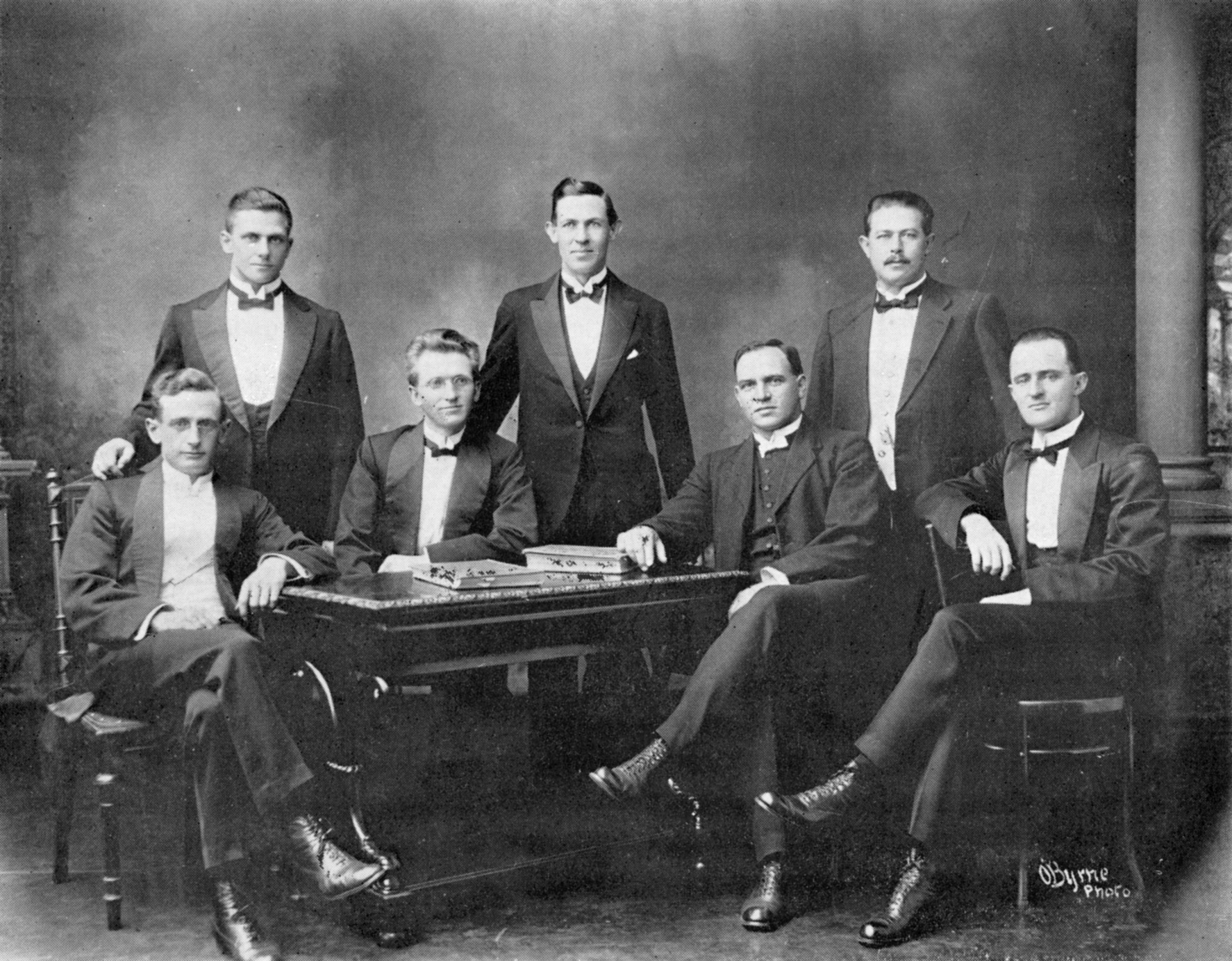
Afrikaner Broederbond leadership in 1918

During the 1930s a group of Broederbond members shaped Afrikaner nationalistic ideology, by trying to create a common "Christian-republican" identity for white, Afrikaans speaking South Africans as well as introducing the idea of Volkskapitalisme (people's capitalism) that tried to take control from the allegedly "British" or "Jewish" capitalism and adapt it to Afrikaner culture. Volkskapitalisme strived to improve the economic conditions of the Afrikaners who in general at the time were less well-off than the English-speaking whites in South Africa. In practice the programme consisted of utilising Afrikaner investment into both new and existing Afrikaner businesses. Although volkskapitalisme managed to develop some Afrikaner businesses, such as Sanlam and Santam (to provide Afrikaners with financial aid) into corporate giants that still have a central role in South African economy, ultimately the economic benefits for the majority of the poor Afrikaners were slim.

Despite the efforts of Broederbond activists to "Afrikanerise" South Africa, the uptake of this new Christian republican identity was slow and unenthusiastic. According to electoral studies the majority of the target group (white, Afrikaans speaking South Africans) did not vote for the National Party until the early 1960s.

=== Popular media ===
During the 1930s and 1940s Afrikaner nationalists used popular medias to diffuse nationalism with maps and narratives of the heroic past of Afrikaners people, moral purpose and a place among other nations. These ideas were spread through new emerging Afrikaner print media, such as the Christian-nationalistic journal Koers (Direction) and more popularised magazines such as Inspan and Huisgenoot as well as books published by the Burger Boekhandel publishing house and the newspapers Die Burger, Transvaler and Volksblad. The usage of Afrikaans instead of Dutch was aggressively promoted throughout the 1920s especially in white schools. The Bible was translated into Afrikaans by J. D. du Toit, E. E. van Rooyen, J. D. Kestell, H. C. M. Fourie and BB Keet in 1933.

=== Rise to power ===
South African opposition to the country's involvement in both wars against Imperial and Nazi Germany led directly to the National Party's rise to power in the 1948 elections, the implementation of apartheid, and culminating finally in Afrikaner mobilisation in 1961; when South Africa voted to leave the British Commonwealth and become a republic. The National Party government implemented, alongside apartheid, a programme of legislated Puritanism. Pornography, gambling and all other such vices were banned because they were all considered contrary to the "Afrikaner way of life". In keeping with Afrikaner Calvinism, adultery and attempted adultery were also criminalised under the Immorality Amendment Act, Act No 23 of 1957.

=== Emerging conflicts ===
During the 1960s a split emerged among the Afrikaner electorate over the issue of how to preserve a distinct identity in a multi-ethnic society: one faction insisted on preserving the national identity through strict isolation, while others thought that such barriers needed to be relaxed. Evidence of this manifested itself in the 1970 election as a radical splinter group from the National Party, the Herstigte Nasionale Party, got 3.59% of the vote compared to the National Party's 54.86%. The gulf widened further during the 1980s partly due to international pressure against apartheid.

One notable Afrikaner nationalist organisation was the Afrikaner Weerstandsbeweging (AWB), a political party and former paramilitary group. The group had the support of an estimated 5–7 percent of white South Africans in 1988. The organisation was consumed with personal and militant scandals in the late 1980s and early 1990s which led to a diminished support. This organisation however, never garnered substantial Afrikaner support and which substantial support was retained by the National Party until its dissolution.

In the 1990s the National Party acknowledged the failure of its ethnic project and under the leadership of F. W. De Klerk dismantled the political system set up from 1948. After apartheid, Afrikaner nationalism lost most of its support.

=== After apartheid ===
The "Vryheidsvlag" (Freedom Flag), registered in 1995 with the South African Bureau of Heraldry as the flag of the Afrikaner Volksfront.

The most well known example of Afrikaner Nationalism after 1994 is the Afrikaner town of Orania in the Northern Cape, South Africa. The town was founded in 1991 with the explicit goals of preserving the Afrikaner culture, language and religion. Only Afrikaners are allowed to stay, live and work in Orania.

Although it has mostly disappeared from publicity, Afrikaner nationalism is kept alive through such political initiatives as the Cyber Republic of the Boer Nation, which claims to be "the only white indigenous tribe in Southern Africa" and has tried to appeal to the UN Working Group on Indigenous Populations for the protection of cultural, linguistic and religious rights of people around the world. In 1996 and 2005, Afrikaner nationalists submitted petitions claiming indigenous status to the UN. The claims were rejected on the grounds that Afrikaners were not marginalised or discriminated against, nor did Afrikaners meet the criteria to be indigenous.

Also some marginal right wing political parties, such as the Herstigte Nasionale Party, still declare their goal to be the "unashamed promotion of Afrikaner nationalism".

Front National (South Africa); a political party in South Africa also emerged in the post-apartheid years promoting Afrikaner Nationalism. The party is linked to South Africa Today media outlet that reports about South African farm attacks and other issues that affect white South Africans.

The tradition of Christian-national education is continued by the Movement for Christian-National Education (Afrikaans: Beweging vir Christelik-Volkseie Onderwys) which educates the youth about the Boere-Afrikaner volk in the Afrikaner Calvinist tradition, Boer culture and history as well as in the Afrikaans language.

The Afrikaner Weerstandsbeweging has largely been inactive in South Africa since the demise of apartheid, although in 2008, the organisation was reactivated and is actively seeking an Afrikaner secessionist state within South Africa. On 3 April 2010, Eugene Terre'Blanche, leader of the AWB, was murdered on his farm.

The Suidlanders is a survivalist Afrikaner group.

== Afrikaner nationalist parties ==
- Freedom Front Plus (1994–present)
- National Conservative Party of South Africa (2016–present)
- Afrikaner Self-determination Party (2020–present)

== Former Afrikaner nationalist parties ==
- Afrikaner Party (1941–1951)
- Herstigte Nasionale Party (1969–present) still operating as a political pressure group
- Conservative Party (South Africa) (1982–2004)
- Front Nasionaal (2013–2020)
- National Party (South Africa) (1914–1997)

== See also ==
- Ethnic nationalism
- Federasie van Afrikaanse Kultuurvereniginge
- Orania
- Suid-Afrikaanse Noodhulpliga
- Volkstaat
- Voortrekkers (youth organisation)
- White nationalism
- White South Africans
- Apartheid laws
