= 1994 Bophuthatswana crisis =

Crisis in South Africa

- Part of the internal resistance to apartheid and the negotiations to end apartheid in South Africa
- Map of Bophuthatswana (red) within South Africa.
Date	9–11 March 1994
Location	South Africa
Result	Removal and abolition of Lucas Mangope's regime; Transitional Executive Council formed on the 13 March 1994; Tjaart van der Walt and Job Mokgoro became Administrator of the Transitional Executive Council on the 13 March 1994; Establishment of a Pro-African National Congress government on the 13 March 1994; Bophuthatswana re-incorporated into South Africa on the 27 April 1994
Territorial changes	Incorporation of Bophuthatswana into North West Province

Belligerents
Bophuthatswana: Afrikaner Volksfront; AWB; (South Africa) South African Defence Force	BDF mutineers

Commanders and leaders
(Bophuthatswana) Lucas Mangope; Constand Viljoen; Jan Breytenbach; Eugène Terre'Blanche	Unknown

Strength
Volksfront: 4,500; AWB: 600	BDF: 5,000

Casualties and losses
Volksfront: 1 killed AWB: 4 killed	BDF: None
- 50–67 civilians killed, 285 wounded

The 1994 Bophuthatswana crisis was a major political crisis which began after Lucas Mangope, the president of Bophuthatswana, a nominally independent South African bantustan created under apartheid, attempted to crush widespread labour unrest and popular demonstrations demanding the incorporation of the territory into South Africa pending non-racial elections later that year. Violent protests immediately broke out following President Mangope's announcement on 7 March that Bophuthatswana would boycott the South African general elections. This was escalated by the arrival of right-wing Afrikaner militias seeking to preserve the Mangope government. The predominantly black Bophuthatswana Defence Force and police refused to cooperate with the white extremists and mutinied. The Afrikaner militias were then forced to leave Bophuthatswana. The South African military entered Bophuthatswana and restored order on 12 March.

The Bophuthatswana Crisis highlighted the deep unpopularity of the Mangope government and the bantustan system among most of the residents. It has been remembered largely for the televised execution of three Afrikaner Weerstandsbeweging (AWB) militants by a black police officer, Ontlametse Bernstein Menyatsoe. This proved to be a public relations disaster for the AWB and demoralised the movement, which was then intent on preserving white minority rule.

== Historical background ==
A product of territorial apartheid, Bophuthatswana - popularly nicknamed "Bop" by its nationals - accepted nominal independence in 1977 from South Africa's Nationalist administration. The second national unit to reach the status of a bantustan with limited but hypothetically increasing powers of self-rule, Bophuthatswana adopted as its governing document an act drafted by the former Tswana Territorial Authority under South African guidance. South Africa was adamant that elections should take place as early as 1972, but there were no political parties in the new region. This changed rapidly with the ascension of Kgosi Lucas Mangope, who founded the Lekoko la Setshaba sa Bophuthatswana (English: "Bophuthatswana National Party"). Mangope targeted rural votes and carried an easy majority in the new parliament.

Although Bophuthatswana was not recognised as a unique entity by any foreign state, an estimated two million Tswana lost their South African citizenship accordingly. The 1977 Constitution made it a self-governing democracy inside the Republic of South Africa, with an area of jurisdiction spanning six black-populated districts of the designated Tswana area. Excluded were zones earmarked for white persons encompassing much of the capital and industry.

=== Prelude ===
Under Mangope's rule, political freedoms in Bophuthatswana deteriorated. Opponents of the state were subject to banishment, arrest, or extrajudicial harassment. The African National Congress was also considered an illegal organisation. Nelson Mandela's release in 1990 and F.W. de Klerk's subsequent negotiations towards ending apartheid opened up the possibility of reincorporating the fragmented bantustans into a unitary South African state. Although all tribal homelands ceased to exist in 1993 under an interim constitution, Mangope remained committed to the principle of Bophuthatswana's "independence". Many Tswana voters were appalled at the prospect of their future exclusion from upcoming South African national elections; opposition mounted but remained subject to escalating repression. Human rights groups complained that citizens were barred from attending voter education programmes and only Mangope loyalists enjoyed the right to assembly.

On 1 January 1994, de Klerk restored South African citizenship to Bophuthatswana residents but balked at the notion of removing its government from power. Mangope agreed to convene with representatives from the Electoral Commission of South Africa yet refused to consider participating in the upcoming national elections. A commission member subsequently warned that "...his [Mangope's] intransigence made confrontation inevitable".

== Events ==
=== General strike ===
In late February, the executives of fifty-two Bophuthatswanan ministries formed the so-called "Mmabatho/Mafikeng Crisis Committee", which was to address the role and status of civil servants following the anticipated re-integration with South Africa. However, Mangope refused to address the committee's concerns and simply maintained he would continue to oppose re-integration with South Africa for the foreseeable future. The committee responded by calling a general strike. Since Bophuthatswana was set to be disestablished by the South African government on 27 April, the civil servants demanded their wages and public pensions well in advance of that date. Lacking the treasury funds to accommodate them, Mangope simply issued no response. This alarmed the Bophuthatswana Police, which joined the strike immediately. When it became clear the country's law enforcement was no longer functioning, mass looting occurred in the capital. The Bophuthatswana Defence Force (BDF) was subsequently deployed to restore order.

On Wednesday, 9 March, the situation further deteriorated. The Bophuthatswana Broadcasting Corporation's staff joined the civil service strike, seized control of the radio and television facilities, and took Lucas Mangope's son Eddie hostage. Meanwhile, the students at Mmabatho University began boycotting classes in support of the strike. Looting continued in Mmabatho, and local business centres such as the Mega City Shopping Complex were severely damaged or destroyed due to unchecked fires. When it became clear that the BDF was taking no action to curb the state of anarchy, Mangope made the decision to call on outside forces to help restore order.

=== Attempted takeover ===
On 8 March 1994, the president invited General Constand Viljoen, head of the right-wing Afrikaner Volksfront, to a meeting of his chief ministers in the Bophuthatswana Defence Force, national police, and intelligence services. It was agreed that Viljoen would use the Volksfront's militia to protect key locations in Bophuthatswana if the situation deteriorated. Parliament was empowered to call on Viljoen's assistance sooner in the case of a forcible re-integration. Mangope initially made it clear, however, that he would not tolerate the Volksfront's more extremist ally, the Afrikaner Weerstandsbeweging, being present because they were a violently racist organisation. Viljoen was regarded as a more moderate white leader, and was respected by the members of the Bophuthatswana Defence Force and police, as he was the former head of both the South African Army (from 1976 to 1980) and the entire South African Defence Force (from 1980 to 1985).

By 10 March, the situation was only worsening and President Mangope was advised to leave Bophuthatswana for his own protection. He promptly left his country via helicopter at two o'clock on Thursday and flew to safety in Motswedi. Later that afternoon, a group of anti-Mangope policemen presented a petition to the South African ambassador, Professor Tjaart van der Walt, calling for Bophuthatswana to be re-integrated into the republic against their president's wishes. By late afternoon virtually all law enforcement authority had broken down and the military was left with the responsibility of maintaining order.

Following more protests and increasing rumors of ANC supporters massing on Bophuthatswana's established borders, Mangope asked Viljoen and the Volksfront to immediately assist in keeping the peace. The Afrikaners were hastily rallied and mobilised, under the command of retired South African Defence Force Colonel Jan Breytenbach. Led by one of Breytenbach's lieutenants, Commandant Douw Steyn, a large Volksfront force mustered at the Mmabatho Air Force Base early on 11 March.

Meanwhile, the South African Defence Force (SADF) prepared to intervene, ostensibly to protect South Africa's Bophuthatswanan embassy and the lives of their nationals in the bantustan. Unwelcomed AWB paramilitaries called in from Ventersdorp and the Western Transvaal (especially Witbank and Rustenburg) were also advancing. Their largest contingents took up positions near Mafikeng and Rooigrond, respectively.

That evening, Colonel Antonie Botse was displeased to see AWB leader Eugene Terre'Blanche and the Volksfront commandant together at the air base, insisting that the former remove his supporters immediately. Jack Turner of the Bophuthatswana Defence Force reiterated Botse's request but Terre'Blanche insisted that Mangope had requested his presence. Turner was concerned that his black troops and the local civilians would panic when they saw AWB personnel, due to Terre'Blanche's established reputation as an extremist. Many of the personnel refused to remove their insignia and serve under Commandant Steyn as agreed.

Several civilians were killed by AWB forces, who fired upon looters and passersby alike. Greg Marinovich, journalist and member of the Bang-Bang Club, stated that one AWB member present had remarked in Afrikaans, "Ons is op 'n kafferskiet piekniek" ('We are on a kaffir-shooting picnic'). In response, the predominantly black Bophuthatswana Defence Force, agitated by their superiors' inability to control the AWB gunmen, mutinied against their white officers and proceeded to take matters into their own hands. They entered Mmabatho and Mafikeng in armoured vehicles, rounded up the AWB and ordered them to leave Bophuthatswana immediately.

The AWB began to withdraw from Mmabatho Air Force Base at noon via convoy, leaving their Volksfront compatriots behind. One AWB member, Francois Alwyn Venter, was shot and killed by the BDF when the convoy attempted to leave the airport and continue to Mmabatho. Driving recklessly through Mafikeng and downtown Mmabatho, some AWB fighters continued to shoot black citizens in the street, killing at least two. Crowds of angry black residents eventually moved to block the convoy's way, chanting defiant slogans. An Afrikaner with an automatic weapon fired several rounds over their heads to disperse the human roadblock.

==== Killing of Wolfaardt, Uys, and Fourie ====
The convoy of AWB vehicles had been firing into roadside houses as they passed through a poor black area of Mafikeng. Members of the Bophuthatswana police had opened fire on the last vehicle of the convoy. AWB Colonel Alwyn Wolfaardt, AWB General Nicolaas Fourie and Veldkornet (Field Cornet) Jacobus Stephanus Uys were driving a blue Mercedes-Benz W108 at the end of the convoy. The driver, Fourie, was shot in the neck; another passenger, Wolfaardt, in the arm; and the remaining passenger, Uys, in the leg. Wolfaardt and Uys were wounded and Fourie died almost instantly. Wolfaardt stumbled out of the car and brandished a handgun but was advised by the onlookers not to start shooting. A Bophuthatswana police officer relieved him of the weapon. Half a dozen reporters who had stumbled on to the scene recorded what followed. A journalist approached and spoke to Wolfaardt, asking if he was a member of the AWB. Wolfaardt confirmed this, reporting that they had been dispatched from Naboomspruit. He then pleaded for the lives of him and his injured comrade, "Please God, help us! Get us some medical help!", he said. In response, another police officer strolled up to the two men, pointed his R4 rifle, and fired two bullets into each men at point-blank range, firing a further two into the body of Fourie, which he then proceeded to kick in the ribs. The execution was captured by the nearby journalists and broadcast worldwide.

Soon after the deaths of the AWB militants, the BDF ordered the Afrikaner Volksfront to leave Bophuthatswana as well. The Volksfront withdrew in a much more orderly fashion later that afternoon, accompanied by a military escort to avoid the general public, although one Volksfront militant, Francois Willem Jansen Van Rensburg, was shot and killed by an unidentified member of the BDF during the withdrawal.

As the Volksfront and AWB completed their withdrawal, SADF troops under General Johannes Geldenhuys moved to occupy Bophuthatswana and assume responsibility for the territory's security. Geldenhuys deployed at least one squadron of Eland armoured cars, as well as infantry mounted in Ratel fighting vehicles, to Mmabatho. His orders were to disarm the BDF mutineers, and ensure the safety of Mangope and Jack Turner. The mutineers, who were equipped with only small arms and lacked senior leadership, surrendered almost immediately.

The government of Bophuthatswana was formally abolished by the South African government a few hours later.

== Aftermath ==
Immediately after the incident, Constand Viljoen, resigned as co-leader of the Afrikaner Volksfront, citing irreconcilable differences in the leadership, and later confirmed the registration of the Freedom Front, a new political party representing white conservatives.

Nelson Mandela later held a rally in Bophuthatswana on March 15, which was attended by 50,000 people. During the rally, he praised members of the Bophuthatswana military and police, "the white far right were given a lesson by the Bophuthatswana Police and Defence Force which they will never forget. They were chased out and humiliated." He also said that the fall of Mangope's regime should serve as a warning to the other "toy tyrants" in the country.

After the transition to nonracial democracy, Lucas Mangope remained active in politics, forming the United Christian Democratic Party in 1997. Party support was confined to the North West Province (which contained most of Bophuthatswana), and at its peak it held three seats out of 400 in the National Assembly. His party argued that under the Xhosa-led ANC, their quality of life in the province would deteriorate and that conditions were improved because Tswana people ruled themselves. Mangope led the party for fifteen years, but was expelled from the party in 2012. He had been accused of being autocratic, but failed to attend his disciplinary hearing, and had his membership terminated. In the runup to the following election, in 2014, many of the party's members, encouraged by Mangope, left to join the Democratic Alliance. The party subsequently lost all of its seats including those in the provincial parliament and provincial legislature.

=== Amnesty hearing ===
The police officer, Ontlametse Bernstein Menyatsoe was not charged with murder. He applied for amnesty to the Truth and Reconciliation Commission (TRC), on the grounds that the killings were politically motivated. The application was opposed by the families of Wolfaardt, Uys and Fourie. At the hearing in August 1999, Menyatsoe was cross-examined by AWB leader Eugene Terre'Blanche. Menyatsoe stated that his emotions were raised by him witnessing a wounded mother, who had been shot when the AWB had fired from their vehicles into a nearby crowd. According to other journalists dozens of paramilitaries had been firing into traditional houses along the road out of Bophuthatswana. Terre'Blanche pointed out that the three soldiers were wounded by the time Menyatsoe shot them, and that they no longer posed any threat. Menyatsoe said that he acted on his own initiative because of the absence of a commanding officer.

Menyatsoe was granted amnesty by the TRC.

== See also ==
- 1987 Transkei coup d'état
- 1990 Ciskei coup d'état
- 1990 Venda coup d'état
