= Van Blerk =

Van Blerk is a Dutch noble surname. Notable people with the surname include:

- Bok van Blerk (born 1978), South African singer-songwriter who sings in Afrikaans
- Cliff van Blerk (1938–2018), Australian soccer player
- Gérard van Blerk (1924–1997), Dutch pianist
- Hendrik van Blerk (1915–2010), South African journalist and writer
- Irvette van Zyl (born Irvette van Blerk, 1987), South African Olympic long-distance runner
- Jason van Blerk (born 1968), Australian soccer player
- Lorraine van Blerk, British academic
