= Eugène Terre'Blanche =

Afrikaner nationalist and activist (1941–2010)

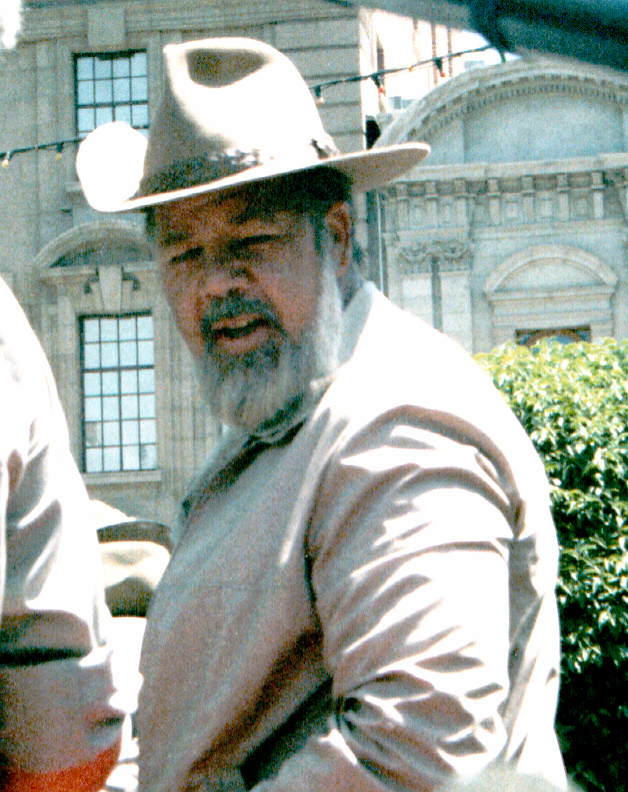
- Terre'Blanche in 2004

Leader and Commander of the Afrikaner Weerstandsbeweging
- In office 7 July 1973 – 3 April 2010
- Preceded by: Party created
- Succeeded by: Steyn von Ronge

Personal details
- Born: Eugène Ney Terre'Blanche; 31 January 1941 Ventersdorp, Transvaal, South Africa
- Died: 3 April 2010 (aged 69) Ventersdorp, North West, South Africa
- Cause of death: Murder
- Resting place: Villana, Ventersdorp
- Party: Afrikaner Weerstandsbeweging (1973–2010)
- Other political affiliations: Herstigte Nasionale Party (before 1973)
- Spouse: Martie Terre'blanche
- Children: 1
- Education: Potchefstroom Hoërvolkskool

Eugène Ney Terre'Blanche (Afrikaans: [ɪə̯ˈʒɛn ˈnɛj tərˈblɑ̃ːʃ], 31 January 1941 (Note: Terre'Blanche's year of birth is alternately given as 1941 or 1944. The majority of sources indicates 1941; sources that claim 1944 as his year of birth include The Star, The Nelson Mandela Foundation and the website of the Afrikaner Weerstandsbeweging) – 3 April 2010) was a South African Afrikaner nationalist and white supremacist who founded and led the neo-Nazi Afrikaner Weerstandsbeweging (AWB; 'Afrikaner Resistance Movement'). Prior to founding the AWB, he served as a South African Police officer, was a farmer, and was a Herstigte Nasionale Party ('Reconstituted National Party') candidate for local office in the Transvaal.

He was a major figure in the right-wing backlash against the collapse of apartheid in the early 1990s. His beliefs and philosophy have continued to be influential amongst white supremacists and white nationalists in South Africa and across the world. He was killed on 3 April 2010, aged 69.

== Background ==
Terre'Blanche's grandfather fought as a Cape Rebel for the Boer cause in the Second Boer War, while his father was a lieutenant colonel in the South African Defence Force and a leader of the local Commando.

The progenitor of the Terre'Blanche name (translatable as either 'white land' or 'white earth' in French) in the region was a French Huguenot refugee, Estienne Terre'Blanche from Toulon (Provence), who arrived at the Cape in 1704, fleeing anti-Protestant persecution in France. The Terre'Blanche name has generally retained its original spelling though other spellings include Terre Blanche, Terblanche and Terblans.

Born on a farm in the Transvaal town of Ventersdorp on 31 January 1941, Terre'Blanche attended Laerskool Ventersdorp and Hoër Volkskool in Potchefstroom, matriculating in 1962. He had many interactions with black people while growing up and spoke fluent Setswana. While in school, he gave early expression to his political leanings by founding the cultural organisation Jong Afrikanerharte (Young Afrikaner Hearts).

He joined the South African Police, and was initially deployed in South West Africa (now Namibia), which had been given to South Africa under a League of Nations Trust mandate after World War I. Upon returning to South Africa, he became a Warrant Officer in the Special Guard Unit, which was assigned to members of the Cabinet.

Under Terre'Blanche, the AWB swore to use violence to preserve minority rule, opposing any concessions offered to the African National Congress – an organisation AWB supporters repeatedly branded as Marxist terrorists – and gaining notoriety for storming the Kempton Park Trade Centre during bilateral negotiations in 1993. AWB loyalists also clashed with South African security forces at the Battle of Ventersdorp, a bloody skirmish in 1991 where police opened fire on a white crowd for the first time since the Rand Rebellion, leaving three AWB members dead. Immediately prior to South Africa's first non-racial election, Terre'Blanche's followers were linked to a number of bombings and assassinations targeting the South African Communist Party; armed AWB commandos participated in the crisis in Bophuthatswana in 1994.

Terre'Blanche spent three years in a Rooigrond prison for assaulting a petrol station attendant and for the attempted murder of a black security guard around 1996. He was released in June 2004. On 3 April 2010, he was murdered on his Ventersdorp farm by two of his employees after an altercation over unpaid wages. His only remaining family member is his grandson, Grant Terre'Blanche, who recently was involved in female abuse lawsuits.

== Political career ==
=== Herstigte Nasionale Party ===
During the late 1960s, Terre'Blanche increasingly opposed what he called the "liberal policies" of B. J. Vorster, then Prime Minister of South Africa. After four years of service in the South African Police, he resigned to pursue a career in politics, running unsuccessfully for local office in Heidelberg as a member of the far-right Herstigte Nasionale Party.

=== Afrikaner Weerstandsbeweging ===
Disillusioned with the established avenues for political participation, Terre'Blanche founded the Afrikaner Weerstandsbeweging (AWB) in Heidelberg with six other individuals in 1973. Initially a secret society, the AWB first appeared on the public scene after its members were charged and fined in connection with the tarring and feathering of Floors van Jaarsveld, a professor of history who had publicly voiced the opinion that the Day of the Vow, a religious public holiday in remembrance of the Battle of Blood River, was nothing more than a secular event with hardly any real reference point in history. Although Terre'Blanche would later express his regrets regarding the incident when testifying before the Truth and Reconciliation Commission, he suggested that his convictions relating to the sanctity of the Day of the Vow might make his actions more understandable. In the years that followed, Terre'Blanche's speeches at public gatherings often evoked the Battle of Blood River, and his oratorical skills earned him much support among the white right wing in South Africa; the AWB claimed 70,000 members at its height. In September 1977, Johannesburg newspaper The World reported that Terre'Blanche had been investigated on charges of bestiality involving a number of African bushpigs.

Throughout the 1980s, Terre'Blanche continued to present himself and the AWB as an alternative to both the National Party-led government and the Conservative Party, and he remained staunchly opposed to the reform policies of P. W. Botha to establish additional, albeit still separate, parliamentary chambers for non-whites, and to grant suffrage to Coloureds and South Africans of Indian origin. The organisation's strongest support was found in the rural communities of South Africa's North, with comparably few supporters in urban areas where his following was largely limited to middle and lower-income Afrikaners.

==== End of apartheid ====
Terre'Blanche viewed the end of apartheid as a surrender to communism, and threatened full-scale civil war if President F. W. de Klerk handed power to Nelson Mandela and the African National Congress. When De Klerk addressed a meeting in Terre'Blanche's hometown of Ventersdorp in 1991, Terre'Blanche led a protest, and the Battle of Ventersdorp ensued between the AWB and the police, with a number of people killed. Terre'Blanche claimed that it was only when he stood between the police and the AWB and demanded a ceasefire that the shooting ended. Terre'Blanche accused President de Klerk of instigating the riot for political gain.

In an attempt to disrupt the negotiation process in 1993, Terre'Blanche led an armed invasion of the World Trade Centre in Kempton Park while negotiations to end apartheid were in progress. After a memorandum of grievances was presented to National Party minister Roelf Meyer and Dawie de Villiers and after an agreement that no arrests would be made, the AWB withdrew from the premises. That evening several identified AWB leaders were arrested and their wives were incarcerated in Soweto, separately from their husbands. Vlakplaas General Krappies Engelbrecht was appointed to launch an investigation.

Terre'Blanche claimed he and President Lucas Mangope of the predominantly ethnic Tswana Homeland of Bophuthatswana came to a "mutual agreement" on 17 February 1992 to aid each other in the "event of a communist threat". On 4 March 1994 Mangope announced that Bophutatswana would not participate in the South African general election in an effort to maintain Bophutatswana's independence from the Republic of South Africa. Bophuthatswana's minister of justice, Godfrey Mothibe tried in vain to convince Mangope to participate in the election, but then accused the ANC of orchestrating the revolt, which was helped by the stance taken by South Africa's Minister of Foreign Affairs, Pik Botha. Thousands of ANC supporters were bussed in from outside Bophuthatswana to support the popular uprising. Terre'Blanche claimed a conspiracy by citing a "three-step plan" by the ANC in an effort to destabilise Bophuthatswana, which included ANC infiltration of the Bophuthatswana police and military. However, ANC candidate for the North West Province, Popo Molefe claimed the ANC was merely supporting the people of Bophuthatswana after it became clear that their political freedoms were limited.

The AWB were subsequently defeated while invading Bophuthatswana to prop up the autocratic leader of the Bantustan in 1994 and Terre'Blanche did not follow up on his earlier threats of war.

Terre'Blanche claimed he had personally communicated with Mangope on 10 March 1994, prior to mobilising his men to protect the capital Mmabatho against looting and unrest. Officers of the Bophuthatswana Defence Force initially received the AWB militia with "great joy and surprise". (Vuur en Verraad, Arthur Kemp) The AWB militia assembled in an airport hangar in Mmabatho, where they were to be provided with rations and firearms. Terre'Blanche ordered his men to remove their AWB badges upon the request of the Bophuthatswana Defence Force. While contained at the hangar, an unidentified and independent faction carrying the AWB emblems started shooting indiscriminately at the public. Terre'Blanche concluded that the South African intelligence services may have set up the shooting in order to discredit the AWB, since the media broadcast footage of the individuals' emblems, but did not publicise their identity. The Bophuthatswana police systematically began to remove the media from strategic locations, and the initial hospitality shown to the AWB militia was replaced by contempt. When Bophuthatswana fell into complete anarchy, the AWB withdrew.

=== 1991 documentary and libel case ===
Terre'Blanche was the subject of the television documentary The Leader, His Driver and the Driver's Wife (1991), directed by British filmmaker Nick Broomfield. Broomfield's documentary claimed Terre'Blanche had an affair with Jani Allan, the journalist who had interviewed him for South Africa's Sunday Times, an assertion she disputed as well as her portrayal in the documentary. This provoked a scandal in the AWB. In July 1989, Cornelius Lottering, a member of the breakaway Orde van die Dood group, orchestrated a failed assassination attempt on Allan's life by placing a bomb outside her Sandton apartment.

This led to Allan taking libel proceedings against the documentary broadcaster Channel 4 in 1992 in the London's High Court. During the court hearings, several transcripts of their alleged sexual relationship appeared in the South African and British press. Terre'Blanche submitted a sworn statement to the London court denying he had had an affair with Allan. In a rare interview with the Afrikaans Sunday newspaper Die Rapport, his wife Martie Terre'Blanche denounced the rumours. Although the judge found that Channel 4's allegations had not defamed Allan, he did not rule on whether or not there had been an affair. The South African business newspaper Financial Mail published a lead story on 6 August detailing the theory that F.W. de Klerk had orchestrated the libel case to discredit Terre'Blanche and the far right movement in South Africa. Allan continued to dismiss the claims.

=== Amnesty ===
Following the end of apartheid, Terre'Blanche and his supporters sought amnesty for the storming of the World Trade Centre, the 'Battle of Ventersdorp', and other acts. Amnesty was granted by the Truth and Reconciliation Commission.

=== Later years ===
In 2004, Terre'Blanche was voted No. 25 in SABC3's Great South Africans, a list of 100 South African personalities. Controversy over the list led the SABC to cancel the television series.

Terre'Blanche was much ridiculed after he was filmed falling off his horse during a parade in Pretoria. After his murder, the state-owned SABC said on the evening news that he would be remembered "as a failed horseman". Terre'Blanche claimed the media only showed part of the fall and explained that unedited footage of the incident would show that the horse had slipped. He accused the media of double standards in reporting when praising Mbhazima Shilowa when he fell from his horse but immediately remounted.

Broomsfield's sequel to his 1991 documentary, His Big White Self, was first broadcast in February 2006. Terre'Blanche was also interviewed by Louis Theroux in episode 3.3 "Boer Separatists" of the BBC series Louis Theroux's Weird Weekends, and was characterized during the episode by Theroux speaking to a former follower of Terre'Blanche as "very hostile, deeply racist".

In March 2008, the AWB announced the re-activation of the political party for 'populist' reasons, citing the encouragement of the public. Reasons for the return have been attributed principally to attacks on commercial farmers and ethnic Boers, the electricity crisis, corruption across government departments and rampant crime. Throughout April 2008, Terre'Blanche was to be the speaker at several AWB rallies, encompassing Vryburg, Middelburg, Mpumalanga and Pretoria.

He had been calling for a "free Afrikaner republic", and vowed to take his campaign to the United Nations' International Court of Justice in The Hague in a bid to secure this. He favoured large tracts of land that he claimed had been purchased from the ethnic Swazis in the eastern portion of the South African Republic, from the Zulus in northern Natal, and others, as well as largely uninhabited portions of the interior that had been settled by the Voortrekkers. In June 2008, it was announced that the AWB Youth Wing would be launched and Terre'Blanche was to be its founding member.

In a video interview in 2008, he voiced his objection to a proposal to change the Springbok emblem of the South Africa national rugby union team (Springboks). He stated that the Springbok emblem could be replaced with an impala or kudu for sports teams representing the new Afrikaner republic.

In September 2009, he addressed a three-day convention attended by 300 Afrikaners which was intended to develop a strategy for "Boer liberation". Terre'Blanche reinforced earlier claims for land in Northern Natal and the Eastern Transvaal. In October 2009 several right-wing groups led by Terre'Blanche outlined their future plans at a Ventersdorp meeting. In an interview with the Mail and Guardian he said he wanted to unite 23 organisations under one umbrella, in order to take, as he had vowed, the fight of "the free Afrikaner" to the International Court of Justice.

In an interview with the Mail and Guardian, he stated that he would publish his biography, Blouberge van Nimmer (The Blue Mountains of Long Ago), in December 2009. The biography was ready for press at the time of his death and published under the name "My Storie", as told to author Amos van der Merwe. A complaint was lodged in December 2009 with the South African Human Rights Commission regarding inflammatory comments he was alleged to have made.

== Conviction and prison sentence ==
On 17 June 2001, Terre'Blanche was sentenced to six years in prison, of which he served three years, for assaulting John Ndzima, a petrol station worker, and the attempted murder of Paul Motshabi, a security guard, in 1996. Terre'Blanche denied both accusations. One of only three whites in the Rooigrond prison near Mafikeng, during his time in prison he claimed to have become a born-again Christian.

=== Assault on Ndzima ===
The assault on Ndzima occurred after a confrontation over Ndzima's testimony against two white boys who had broken into a pharmacy in Ventersdorp. Terre'Blanche said that he merely argued with Ndzima after the burglary, questioning Ndzima's claims to have seen the burglars. According to Terre'Blanche, during the argument his dog broke loose and chased Ndzima. Terre'Blanche asked the state prosecution to explain why there was no blood on his overall after the alleged assault. He claimed that a bogus case had been built against him in order to "bury the conservative element of Afrikaner-nationalism in the shallow grave of injustice". The court rejected his claims, concluding that Terre'Blanche had assaulted Ndzima as retribution for testifying against whites. Terre'Blanche later said that his defence attorney had resigned as a member of the ultra-conservative white Conservative Party's Volksraad and joined the ANC shortly after the conclusion of the court case.

=== Attempted murder of Motshabi ===
Security guard Motshabi was permanently disabled when he was beaten by Terre'Blanche in 1996. He was crippled and intellectually impaired by brain damage sustained in the attack, and his wife left him. He was one of 16 victims of violence in the South Africa's North West who received new houses as part of the national government's campaign to mark 16 days of activism against violence against women and children.

Terre'Blanche also maintained his innocence in the Motshabi case, stating that he had discovered Motshabi already beaten in a park while patrolling Ventersdorp, after which he took him to hospital. Although he was not present when the alleged attack happened, Gabriel Kgosimang, an ex-employee of Terre'Blanche, testified that his former employer had repeatedly beaten Motshabi over the head, upper body, neck and shoulders after he crashed into him with his vehicle. The official medical report only cites a single hit to the head.

Motshabi died due to natural causes on 23 August 2017, aged 48.

=== Subsequent disputes ===
Terre'Blanche was released on 11 June 2004. The AWB website continued to claim that these accusations, along with other scandals involving him, were fabricated by the "Black Government and the left wing media". Terre'Blanche subsequently claimed that a policeman had identified the real attackers of Motshabi. The names were supposedly contained in a sealed envelope and kept in safekeeping with instructions given that this information would be released in case something "unnatural" should happen to him. Despite the murder of Terre'Blanche, no names have been released.

== Poetry ==
Prior to the 1994 non-racial elections, Terre'Blanche's Afrikaans-language works were on the state syllabus of Natal schools. Upon his release from jail, he quoted Wordsworth's poem "I Wandered Lonely As a Cloud". He had previously released a CD of his poetry collection and later a DVD. The DVD was named "Inktrane", which is directly translated to English as "ink tears".

== Death ==
Terre'Blanche, who had lived in relative obscurity since the decline of his organisation, was murdered on his farm Villana, just outside Ventersdorp, on 3 April 2010. He was beaten and hacked to death with pipes and panga machetes whilst napping. His body was found on his bed with severe facial and head injuries. His murder has been categorised as a notable case of South African farm attacks.

South African President Jacob Zuma, who followed up an overnight statement with a televised address, called for calm and for "responsible leadership" following the murder, describing it as a "terrible deed;" and described the murderer as "cowardly." Zuma's words were echoed by the AWB and organisations including AfriForum and Solidarity. Minister of Police Nathi Mthethwa, Commissioner of police Bheki Cele and other high ranking police officials and politicians visited Terre'Blanche's family in Ventersdorp the morning after the murder to express sympathy with the family.

=== Perpetrators ===
Chris Mahlangu, aged 28, and Patrick Ndlovu, aged 15, were arrested. Both were employees at Terre'Blanche's farm. They were both charged with murder, and one was released on bail. Terre'Blanche's daughter Bea told the media that the two workers had not been paid for March because her father could not get his banking in order before the Easter weekend, and that an arrangement had been made to pay them after the weekend. She stated that he had enjoyed a good relationship with his employees, which had been strengthened by their work with animals on the farm.

=== Aftermath ===
Chris Mahlangu's announcement to other farm workers that he was "now their boss" fuelled suspicions that the murder was politically motivated. The murder took place amid a racial controversy in South Africa involving the singing of a song by then African National Congress Youth League leader Julius Malema, which includes the lyrics "Shoot the Boer" ("Dubul' ibhunu"). The ANC, which had previously defended its right to sing the song, announced that it would consider a moratorium on the singing of the song, following the murder, in the interests of national cohesion. Democratic Alliance leader Helen Zille said that the murder would "inflame tensions" in South Africa. Malema denied the song had anything to do with the murder, and defended his singing of it, saying he was "ready to die", and that he was not scared of Boers, in reference to threats that Terre'Blanche would be avenged. ANC leaders later announced a temporary ban on the singing of the song.

Thousands attended Terre'Blanche's funeral, held at noon on 9 April 2010 at Ventersdorp's Protestant Church. Later the same day, he was buried on his farm.

=== Court case ===
The two suspects appeared in court in Ventersdorp on 6 April 2010 amid racially charged scenes, and were charged with murder, robbery and crimen injuria, for injuring the dignity of Terre'Blanche by leaving his trousers pulled down after killing him. The AWB retracted earlier calls to avenge the murder as Zuma appealed for peace. Nevertheless, members of the ANC supported the accused by turning up at the court in huge numbers, and singing revolutionary songs. Terre'Blanche's supporters also turned up at the court, singing the former South African national anthem, "Die Stem van Suid Afrika".

On 22 May 2012, 29-year-old Chris Mahlangu was found guilty of the murder and sentenced to life in prison. 18-year-old Patrick Ndlovu, the other man accused in the case, was acquitted of murder due to a lack of forensic evidence, though he was found guilty of breaking-in. They had both pleaded not guilty, and declined to testify. Protesters from both sides were gathered outside the court when the verdict was read. Judge John Horn ruled that there was no evidence that Mahlangu had been acting in self-defence, and that the murder had been committed for financial reasons. Although Mahlangu claimed that he had been raped, Horn declared that if that was the case he should have raised it immediately, which he had not done. He also claimed that he had been acting in retaliation because he had been living in an "appalling condition ... not fit for human habitation," as well as having experienced child exploitation on the farm.

== In popular culture ==
In Harry Turtledove's 1992 science fiction novel The Guns of the South, Eugene Terre'Blanche is fictionalised as the minor character Eugen Blankaard, whose name is a literal Afrikaans translation. This character, a historian of AWB, does not appear directly, but his writings are read by other characters. A poster of Terre'Blanche appears in the 1992 Australian drama Romper Stomper, about a neo-Nazi group in suburban Melbourne.

Terre'Blanche is the subject of two Nick Broomfield documentaries: The Leader, His Driver, and the Driver's Wife and His Big White Self.

Louis Theroux interviewed Terre'Blanche in 2000 as part of his Weird Weekends documentary on the Boers.

== See also ==
- Afrikaner nationalism
- White nationalism
- Volkstaat
- Orania, Northern Cape
- South African farm attacks

== Notes ==
Political offices
New office	President of Afrikaner Weerstandsbeweging; 1973–2010	Succeeded by Steyn von Ronge
