= His Big White Self =

- Directed by: Nick Broomfield
- Starring: Nick Broomfield; Eugène Terre'Blanche
- Original language: English

Production
- Running time: 85 minutes

Original release
- Network: Channel 4
- Release: 3 April 2006

His Big White Self is a 2006 documentary film made by Nick Broomfield. It is a sequel to his earlier documentary The Leader, His Driver and the Driver's Wife (1991). It was first shown as part of More4's Nick Broomfield week which began on 27 February 2006. The documentary follows Broomfield as he returns to South Africa 12 years after the final end of the apartheid regime. His previous film focused largely on JP Meyer, a driver for Eugène Terre'Blanche (the leader of the far-right Afrikaner Weerstandsbeweging), and JP's wife, Anita.

== Content ==
In His Big White Self, Broomfield explores conditions after his return to Ventersdorp in the former Transvaal (now North West Province). He meets with JP, a former driver of Eugene Terre'Blanche, head of the Afrikaner Weerstandsbeweging (Afrikaner Resistance Movement), and his wife Anita to see how their lives have changed since the fall of apartheid in 1994. (He had covered the lives of the couple in his earlier documentary). JP and Anita had divorced since 1991.

JP works as an ambulance driver, splitting his time between this and his new wife. Anita moved to the town of Ottosdal and devotes much of her time to their grandchildren, teaching them Afrikaaner ways and traditions. JP expresses feelings of betrayal, as he believed that the Afrikaner Weerstandsbeweging would instigate a 'Boer revolution' in its quest for a white homeland after Mandela and the ANC came to power. The AWB failed to achieve this goal.

JP justifies apartheid and its principles of separation by race as the 'best way' for South Africa to exist harmoniously. Anita, by contrast, has shifted from being a radical champion of white rule to concluding that a minority has no right to govern a majority.

== Eugene Terre'Blanche ==
Broomfield also gains access to Eugene Terre'Blanche himself, meeting him in disguise to prevent the leader from recognising him. During Broomfield's previous meeting with Terre'Blanche, the leader considered himself to have been portrayed as foolish, leading to death threats being sent to Broomfield. The film also documents some particularly noteworthy events which all occurred in the run up to the ending of Apartheid and the South African general election, 1994. This includes the events of 9 August 1991, when President F. W. de Klerk visited Ventersdorp (the leader's birthplace and a major power base for the AWB at the time), and the battle which subsequently ensued when the AWB allegedly cut the town's power supply and began firing on police.

The Storming of Kempton Park World Trade Centre is also shown. In June 1993, the AWB and other far right groups stormed the Kempton Park World Trade Centre near Johannesburg. At the time, the venue was being used for negotiations between the ANC and the National Party to end Apartheid. The AWB again made national headlines when in March 1994 they invaded the tribal homeland of Bophuthatswana, uninvited and seemingly acting as if on a hunting parade, killing many civilians. The film captures the occasion when three AWB commandos were summarily executed by a Bophuthatswanan soldier as they were attempting to leave the tribal homeland. At the time, Bophuthatswana was still a so-called independent homeland for blacks set up by the Apartheid regime and its leader, Lucas Mangope, was refusing to reintegrate the homeland with the new South Africa, prompting a coup.

The film's final scene shows Anita, still working as a nurse, treating a small black child who has sustained some minor leg wounds, which seemingly alludes to the new South Africa where black and white are no longer separate; previously, hospitals were segregated by race, as were many other public amenities.

== Release ==
The film was released in the UK as a DVD boxset together with The Leader, His Driver and the Driver's Wife on 3 April 2006.
