= (Don't) touch me on my studio =

South African meme

(Don't) touch me on my studio is a South African meme that developed out of an e.tv television interview, 7 April 2010, with André Visagie, former Secretary General of the far-right organization, the Afrikaner Weerstandsbeweging (AWB), and political analyst, Lebohang Pheko. The two were discussing race relations in South Africa in the aftermath of AWB leader Eugène Terre'Blanche's murder. Pheko confronted Visagie about the alleged abuse of farm workers in South Africa, and the anchor of the show, Chris Maroleng, had to intervene when Visagie lost his temper, ripping off his microphone and storming off the set before returning and saying: "You won't dare interrupting me ... I am not finished with you [sic]."

Maroleng's repeated statement to Visagie, "(Don't) touch me on my studio, (don't) touch me on my studio [sic]," and the AWB member's adamant response, "I'll touch you on your studio", became a focus of jokes on Twitter, email, Facebook, forums and video remixes on YouTube. The Broadcasting Complaints Commission received 19 complaints about Maroleng's handling of the issue but these complaints were rejected.

Antjie Krog, South African poet and academic, has expressed misgivings about the meme: "an Afrikaner and a black man's inability to use correct English has become the laughing stock of the country".
