= Koketso Moeti =

South African civic activist

- Known for: Civic engagement app

Koketso Moeti is a civic activist based in South Africa known for creating the text message-based civic engagement tool Amandla.mobi.

== Career ==
In 2014, Moeti founded Amandla.mobi, a mobile phone civic engagement tool that connects community organizers with formal campaign-building tools. The app's users connect through text message and WhatsApp and organize on issues including gender violence, data costs, and eviction. Moeti decided to pursue the app based on her experience using her cell phone to organize against evictions in her northwest South African community of Rooigrond. She found that those impacted by decisions would participate in public consultation periods when given the tools to organize. One of Moeti's campaigns led the South African government to fully subsidize the cost of the mandatory transition from analog to digital television for the poor. By late 2019, the app had around 300,000 users. Amandla.mobi received its original seed funding from venture capitalists and has since received grants from several foundations. Moeti wants to become member-funded. OkayAfrica wrote that her app had affected millions through its resource and support network. Moeti was named an Obama Fellow for her work with the app and was selected for the 2019 Tech for Global Good cohort, both of which provided business resources for the app's expansion.
