= Lorraine van Blerk =

British geographer and academic

Lorraine van Blerk FRSE FAcSS
- Born: Lorraine Young

Academic background
- Education: Coventry University (PhD); Royal Holloway, University of London (MA); University of Strathclyde (BA)

Academic work
- Discipline: Geographer
- Sub-discipline: Sub-saharan development geography
- Institutions: University of Dundee; University of Reading; Brunel University of London

Lorraine van Blerk (née Young) is a British geographer, academic and author. She is currently the vice-principal of research and innovation and chair of human geography at the University of Dundee, and she was awarded a Fellowship of the Royal Society of Edinburgh in 2026.

== Early life and education ==
Van Blerk grew up on the west coast around Glasgow, Scotland. In 1991, she attended the University of Strathclyde to study geography, and graduated with a Bachelor of Arts in 1995.

In 1996, Van Blerk attended Royal Holloway, University of London, to study development geography. Her dissertation was about informal education for girls in Pakistan. In 1997, she obtained a Master of Arts.

In 1998, Van Blerk began pursuing a Doctor of Philosophy at Coventry University. Her research was regarding the "social and spatial inequalities" experienced by street children in Kampala, Uganda.

== Career ==
Upon graduation, Van Blerk joined Brunel University of London, and continued her research in Kampala street children. In 2006, she joined the University of Reading. Later, she joined the University of Dundee.

In June 2020, Van Blerk was appointed as an honorary professor at the University of Cape Town. In October 2021, she was elected a Fellow of the Academy of Social Sciences, for her research on global social justice and equality. In 2026, Van Blerk was elected a Fellow of the Royal Society of Edinburgh, in the discipline of economics and social sciences.

Van Blerk is currently the vice-principal of research and innovation and chair of human geography at the University of Dundee.

== Research ==
Van Blerk's research is focused on the lives of children and youth, who have been impacted by socio-cultural changes and inequalities, in sub-Saharan Africa.

In 2012, Van Blerk jointly developed and led a research titled Growing up on the Streets, which looked at the lives of children and youth, who grew up in informal settlements and on the streets. Six youths in each of the three cities (Note: Namely, Accra, Ghana, Bukavu, Democratic Republic of Congo, and Harare, Zimbabwe) were trained with research skills and basic ethnography, and were recruited as researchers for the project. The research created a dataset of more than 2400 ethnographic reports, which was used for policy discussions and other projects.

To date, Van Blerk has authored or co-authored over 100 publications.

== Selected publications ==
=== Books ===
- Hörschelmann, Kathrin; van Blerk, Lorraine (3 November 2011). Miles, Malcolm; Short, John Rennie (eds.). Children, Youth and the City. New York: Routledge. doi:10.4324/9780203967560. ISBN 9780415376921. LCCN 2011017184. OCLC 794003791.
- van Blerk, Lorraine; Kesby, Mike, eds. (15 August 2014). Doing Children’s Geographies: Methodological Issues in Research with Young People. New York: Routledge. doi:10.4324/9781315869216. ISBN 9780415761970. OCLC 253197516.
- von Benzon, Nadia; van Blerk, Lorraine, eds. (14 August 2020). Geographical Research with 'Vulnerable Groups': Re-examining Methodological and Ethical Process (1 ed.). Routledge. doi:10.4324/9781351180849. ISBN 9780367592820.
- Pincock, Kate; Jones, Nicola; van Blerk, Lorraine; Gumbonzvanda, Nyaradzayi, eds. (24 January 2024). Young People in the Global South: Voice, Agency and Citizenship. Rethinking Development. New York: Routledge. doi:10.4324/9781003341666. ISBN 9781032377421. LCCN 2023038492. OCLC 1412621187.

=== Journal articles ===
- Young, Lorraine; Barrett, Hazel (11 July 2000). "Adapting Visual Methods: Action Research with Kampala Street Children". Area. 33 (2). Wiley-Blackwell: 141–152. eISSN 1475-4762. ISSN 0004-0894. LCCN 76014310. OCLC 46697281. CODEN AREAB6 – via JSTOR.
- Ansell, Nicola; van Blerk, Lorraine (September 2004). "Children's migration as a household/family strategy: Coping with AIDS in Lesotho and Malawi". Journal of Southern African Studies. 30 (3). Routledge: 673–690. doi:10.1080/0305707042000254155. eISSN 1465-3893. ISSN 0305-7070. JSTOR 03057070. LCCN 2001-227376. OCLC 48532114.
- van Blerk, Lorraine (April 2005). "Negotiating Spatial Identities: Mobile Perspectives on Street Life in Uganda". Children's Geographies. 3 (1). Routledge: 5–21. doi:10.1080/14733280500037091. eISSN 1473-3277. ISSN 1473-3285. LCCN 2004238416. OCLC 53090063.
- Robson, Elsbeth; Ansell, Nicola; Huber, Ulli S.; Gould, William T. S.; van Blerk, Lorraine (March 2006). "Young Caregivers in the Context of the HIV/AIDS Pandemic in sub-Saharan Africa". Population, Space and Place. 12 (2). Wiley-Blackwell: 93–111. doi:10.1002/psp.392. eISSN 1544-8452. ISSN 1544-8444. LCCN 2003212283. OCLC 52262362.
- van Blerk, Lorraine (June 2008). "Poverty, migration and sex work: youth transitions in Ethiopia". Area. 40 (2). Wiley-Blackwell: 245–253. doi:10.1111/j.1475-4762.2008.00799.x. eISSN 1475-4762. ISSN 0004-0894. LCCN 76014310. OCLC 46697281. CODEN AREAB6.
