= Steyn von Rönge =

South African politician

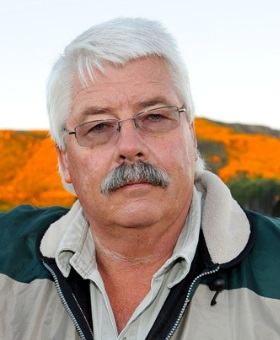

President of Afrikaner Weerstandsbeweging
- Incumbent
- Assumed office 8 April 2010
- Preceded by: Eugène Terre'Blanche

Personal details
- Born: Steyn von Rönge; 7 April 1955 (age 71) Zastron, South Africa
- Party: Afrikaner Weerstandsbeweging
- Other political affiliations: National Party
- Children: 3
- Education: Potchefstroom Hoërvolkskool; University of the Free State
- Occupation: Politician
- Profession: Farmer

Steyn von Rönge (born 7 April 1955) is a South African farmer and the incumbent president of the Afrikaner Weerstandsbeweging (AWB). He was born to George Napier van Ryneveld and Elsie Catharina (Née Cailtz). He is married to Cornelia (Née de Beer). von Rönge was the deputy leader of the AWB who took over the reins after Eugene Terre'Blanche, the founding president, was murdered 3 April 2010. He had previously acted as leader of the AWB when Terre'Blanche was in prison.

Steyn von Rönge was appointed as a leader of AWB on 6 April 2010 without voting. He joined the AWB in 1983 during the first referendum, as he did not vote with PW Botha's decisions. He soon moved to the deputy and chairman of the Movement. His goals are the establishment of a white homeland and a security plan to protect farmers against farm attacks.

Von Rönge is a third-generation cattle farmer in the Zastron district, in southern Free State. He has two daughters and a son and graduated in 1972 from Zastron High School. During his military service he was at the South African Air Force in Pretoria, where he was a physical education instructor. He has a bachelor's degree from the University of the Free State. After graduating he worked as a clerk at an auditing firm.

Terre'Blanche allegedly promised the AWB leadership to both von Rönge and Andre Visagie, the AWB's then secretary general. However, von Rönge could provide proof of his appointment with a fax signed on 12 March 2010 with two witnesses in which Terre'Blanche asked von Rönge to take over the leadership until he had recovered from his heart surgery.

Political offices
New title	President of the Afrikaner Resistance Movement; 2010–present	Succeeded by Incumbent
