= Hendrik van Blerk =

South African poet and writer (1915–2010)

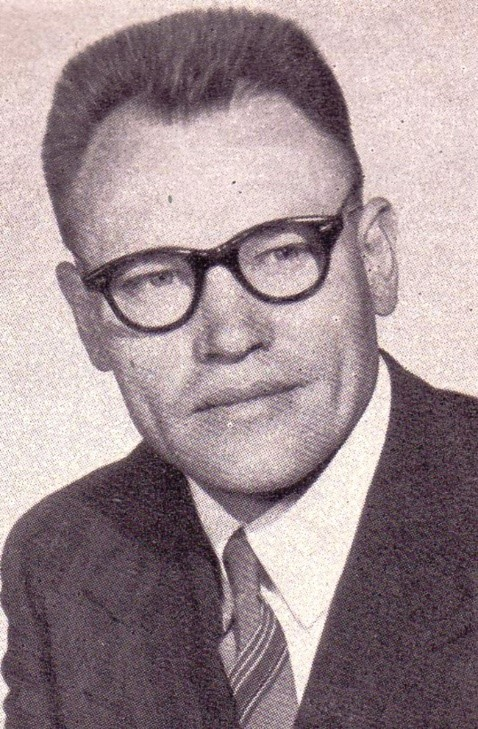
- Born: 27 November 1915; Johannesburg
- Died: 25 December 2010 (aged 95)
- Spouse: Petronella Johanna Snyman (Married 1 August 1952)
- Children: 4
- Writing career
- Language: English, Afrikaans
- Genre: Poetry

Hendrik van Blerk (1915–2010), also called Oom Hendrik, was an Afrikaans writer and poet. His first book, Dit blom tussen bantoms, was published in 1949. He published hundreds of novels, youth stories, short stories, as well as fact books about the history of the Afrikaner. He also wrote under the pseudonym Melt Froneman.

== Life and work ==
=== Origin and early life ===
Hendrik Stephanus Hertzog van Blerk was born on 27 November 1915 in Regentspark in Johannesburg as the youngest of a family of three and the only son. His parents are Francois Petrus van Blerk and Elizabeth Maria Maryna Magrietha Pretorius. /ref> His mother as well as his mother-in-law were young girls in the concentration camps in the Free State during the Anglo-Boer War. In this war, his father's family lost their farm after it was burnt down and they could not recover it afterwards. These experiences give Van Blerk a wealth of information that later finds expression in his books. Initially, his father made a living with digging and pick work at Hartebeespoort Dam. However, his father has a nomadic nature that is always looking for better and therefore the family moves around a lot, among other things several times to the diggings. Van Blerk went to school in Heidelberg for the first time, after which he received his training at a road-making school in tents that accompanied the road-making camp wherever they had to build new roads. Still later he went to school at Springs, Welgedacht, Modderfontein, Rooikoppies and Brits. After he got through standard two, he went to Lichtenburg's diamond mining with his father in a donkey cart and during the winter the family moved here more permanently. Here he completes standard three and the following year they live as boarders on a farm in Mafikeng, where he and a few other children attend a school on Rooigrond ten kilometers away by donkey cart. From there they went back to the mining and after he finished standard five, they moved again. He didn't go to school again until August the following year, this time to a two-man school on the farm Rietpan in the Western Transvaal, where the family are again regulars. Finally he achieved his standard six certificate in 1931 in the village of Delareyville.

=== Financial problem ===
When the family moved to Johannesburg, Hendrik stopped his studies and mined coiled diamonds for a while in Lichtenburg. After this, he hired himself out as a sixteen-year-old boy to a wood rider, who transports wood on a donkey cart from Marico. In 1932 he found himself in the middle of the depression in Johannesburg. Here he does various jobs and is first a factory worker, then a messenger and road maker. Together with his parents and two sisters, by 1935 they could only afford to live in a garage without a ceiling. Later he was a sewer digger, worked in a furniture factory and then entered the service of the South African Railways for a short time. Finally he ends up as a miner in the gold mines.

=== Political beliefs ===
During the Second World War, he joined the Ossewabrandwag and was involved, among other things, in blowing up a post office in Benoni, during which a passerby was killed by the explosion. On 9 July 1942, he was then sentenced to death due to a charge of malicious damage to state property. After 28 days on death row, the sentence is commuted to life imprisonment, effectively twenty years. In the Central Prison in Pretoria he began to write seriously. When the National Party came to power in 1948, he was released on 12 June 1948 after spending six years and 24 days in prison. He then marries staff nurse Petronella Johanna (Nell) Snyman. The couple has two daughters (Petronella Johanna – Petra, who later writes poetry herself and publishes the poetry collection Skerf, and Elizabeth Maryna) and two sons (Willem Sternberg and Hendrik Stephanus). The family first settled in Ermelo where he became a grain grader, after which they returned to Johannesburg. Here he is first a journalist and then becomes a school bus contractor. He bought an old school bus with which he drove children to the schools and while they were in class, he sat in the bus and wrote.

=== Later years and death ===
In the late thirties he bought an agricultural holding near Benoni, where he lived intermittently from 1938 and where he also later retired. During the years he was in prison, the Ossewa Fire Brigade, on the instructions of commandant-general Hans van Rensburg, paid off the full outstanding amount for the holding in recognition of Van Blerk's contribution to the resistance struggle against the Smuts government and his participation in the Second World War together with England against Germany. Van Blerk has been particularly active in right-wing Boer politics all his life and, among other things, set up the Majuba Boerevolktrust. He died on 25 December 2010.
