= Storming of the Kempton Park World Trade Centre =

1993 event in South Africa

- Date: June 25, 1993
- Location: Kempton Park World Trade Centre
- Motive: Protest against Apartheid negotiations and demanding of a Volkstaat
- Organized by: Afrikaner Weerstandsbeweging; Afrikaner Volksfront
- Participants: 10,000-15,000
- Outcome: Police failure to prevent storming by AWB members
- Property damage: 700,000 Rand
- Charges: 60 AWB members charged

The storming of the Kempton Park World Trade Centre took place in South Africa on 25 June 1993 when approximately three thousand members of the Afrikaner Volksfront (AVF), Afrikaner Weerstandsbeweging (AWB) and other right-wing Afrikaner paramilitary groups stormed the World Trade Centre in Kempton Park, near Johannesburg.

At the time of the attack the World Trade Centre was the venue for multi-party negotiations to end the apartheid system through the country's first multi-racial elections. These negotiations were strongly opposed by right-wing white groups in South Africa. The invasion came after other clashes between police and right-wingers, such as the Battle of Ventersdorp, and much belligerent rhetoric from right-wing leaders such as Eugène Terre'Blanche of the AWB.

== Storming of the negotiation venue ==
A protest led by the AVF was scheduled for 25 June outside the negotiation venue. At 8 a.m. protesters began arriving, and began harassing delegates to the negotiations.

The mood had begun as a festive one, with AWB supporters bringing their families, as well as barbecuing equipment and other provisions, associations one would normally make with a peaceful sit-in or protest. However, the mood changed for the worse when members of Terre'Blanche's personal bodyguard wing, the Ystergarde (Iron Guard) began rocking cars; many were armed, paramilitary members of various right-wing organisations, carrying firearms and other weapons.

A 'Viper' armoured vehicle was used to crash through the glass windows of the WTC allowing supporters, carrying firearms and chanting "AWB", to invade the premises. Police attempted to form a cordon to prevent the invasion but were ineffective. A police captain who tried to prevent the vehicle from breaking through was assaulted and suffered internal bleeding. Once inside, the right-wingers were effectively left in control of the building while the multi-party negotiation delegates took cover by hiding in meeting rooms. The protesters painted slogans on the walls, urinated over furniture, and harassed delegates. Damage was estimated at more than 700,000 Rand.

The protesters also held a prayer meeting in the main negotiating chamber. Before leaving, negotiations with the police were held in which it was agreed that no members would be arrested that day. The departure was peaceful compared to the entrance.

General Constand Viljoen, a conservative Afrikaner leader who was participating in the negotiations, later denied that the invasion was planned by the Afrikaner Volksfront as part of their protest, and criticised the AWB members who had "got out of hand".

== Goldstone Commission ==
The Goldstone Commission, headed by Justice Richard Goldstone, was tasked with investigating the protest. The commission found that the South African Police protecting the negotiations had been completely ineffective, that the protesters had broken the law and breached agreed conditions for their protest, and welcomed the arrest and charging of 60 persons. It found that the AWB members had acted as hooligans, and recommended that assurances from the AWB regarding the conduct of its members should not be relied on in future. It also made recommendations to further restrict public carrying of weapons, paramilitary uniforms and face covering during demonstrations.
