= 1996 Shoprite bombing =

Supermarket terrorist bombing attack in Worcester, South Africa

The 1996 Shoprite bombing was a white supremacist terrorist attack that took place on 24 December 1996 after a bomb was detonated at a Shoprite supermarket in Worcester, South Africa killing 4 people and wounding several others. A second bomb placed in a tree down the street at a local pharmacy was also detonated, injuring 2 sitting nearby.

== Planning and motive ==
The four men involved in the bombings, who were all members of the Israel Vision religious sect, were Abraham "Koper" Myburgh, Cliff Barnard, Jan "Voetbol" van der Westhuizen and Stefaans Coetzee. Coetzee was 17 at the time of bombing. All four men were part of the Afrikaner nationalist, neo-Nazi, and white supremacist paramilitary organisation Afrikaner Weerstandsbeweging, or AWB for short. Their ideology is seen as the primary motive for the attack.

== Bombing ==
On 24 December 1996, Jan van der Westhuizen walked into a Shoprite store in Worcester and discreetly planted a bomb in a Christmas tree decoration. The attackers left four explosive devices, only blasting two, despite this the explosion killed four civilians (including three children).

Abraham "Koper" Myburgh, Cliff Barnard, Jan van der Westhuizen, and Stefaans Coetzee were all found guilty of murder. With the exception of Coetzee, who received a 40-year sentence, each of the men received life terms. Coetzee was released on parole in July 2015. He has since recanted his views and met with the relatives of some of his victims in an act of reconciliation.
