= Afrikaner Weerstandsbeweging =

South African neo-Nazi political party

Afrikaner Resistance Movement Afrikaner Weerstandsbeweging
- Abbreviation: AWB
- Leader: Steyn von Rönge
- Founder: Eugène Terre'Blanche
- Founded: 7 July 1973
- Split from: Herstigte Nasionale Party
- Headquarters: Ventersdorp, North West Province, South Africa
- Membership: 70,000 (c. 1993); 5,000 (c. 2014)
- Ideology: Volkstaat; Neo-Nazism; Afrikaner nationalism White supremacy Apartheid; Anti-Black racism Anti-communism; Antisemitism
- Political position: Far-right
- Religion: Afrikaner Calvinism
- Colors: Red White Black
- Slogan: "God, Volk, Vaderland" ("God, People, Fatherland")

Party flag

Website
- Official website

The Afrikaner Weerstandsbeweging (Afrikaans pronunciation: [ˌafriˈkɑːnər ˈviərstants.ˌbəˈviəχəŋ], meaning 'Afrikaner Resistance Movement'), commonly known by its abbreviation AWB [ˌɑː.viə.ˈbiə], is an Afrikaner nationalist, white supremacist, and neo-Nazi political party in South Africa. Founded in 1973 by Eugène Terre'Blanche and six other far-right Afrikaners, the AWB advocates for secessionist Afrikaner nationalism and the establishment of an independent Boer-Afrikaner republic, referred to as the "Volkstaat" or "Boerestaat", within part of South Africa.

During the negotiations to end apartheid in the early 1990s, the organisation committed acts of terror and violence against black South Africans. As of 2014, the AWB reportedly had approximately 5,000 members and utilized social media platforms for recruitment. The organisation never participated in elections in South Africa, neither during the apartheid years nor in post-apartheid South Africa.

== History ==
On 7 July 1973, Eugène Terre'Blanche, a former police officer, called a meeting of several men in Heidelberg, Gauteng, in the then-Transvaal Province of South Africa. He was disillusioned by what he thought were Prime Minister B. J. Vorster's "liberal views" of racial issues in the White minority country, after a period in which Black majorities had ascended to power in many former colonies. Terre'Blanche also worried about what he characterised as communist influences in South African society. He decided to form a group with six other like-minded persons, which they named the Afrikaner Weerstandsbeweging ('Afrikaner Resistance Movement'; AWB), to promote Afrikaner and Christian nationalism. His associates elected him as head of the group, a position he held until he was killed on his farm in April 2010.

Their objective was to establish an independent Boerestaat ("Boer State") for Boer-Afrikaner people only. It was to be independent of apartheid South Africa, which they considered too left-wing and liberal. The AWB was formed to try to regain the ground they thought lost after the Second Boer War; the men intended to re-establish the independent Boer Republics of the past: the South African Republic (Zuid-Afrikaansche Republiek) and the Republic of the Orange Free State (Oranje Vrystaat). The organization was strongly antisemitic and advocated for the extermination of South Africa's Jewish population.

=== Apartheid era ===
During the 1970s and 1980s, the AWB attracted several thousand white South Africans as members. They opposed the superficial reform of apartheid laws by P. W. Botha during the 1980s, harassing liberal politicians and holding large (and often quite rowdy) political rallies. Terre'Blanche used his flamboyant oratorial skills and forceful personality to win converts. He railed against the lifting of many so-called "petty apartheid" laws, such as the law banning interracial sex and marriage (the Race Relations Act), mixing of the races (Group Areas Act), as well as the government providing limited political rights to Indian South Africans and Cape Coloureds (mixed-race individuals). During the State of Emergency (1984–86), AWB violence and murders of unarmed non-whites were reported. The AWB especially opposed the then-illegal African National Congress (ANC). The ruling National Party (NP) considered the AWB to be a fringe group.

The group operated relatively unhindered until 1986, when white South African Police (SAP) officers took the unprecedented step of using lachrymatory agent or tear gas against the AWB when they disrupted a National Party rally. In the early 1990s, the organisation was estimated to have 70,000 members out of a population of 5 million white South Africans. In the Nick Broomfield documentary film, His Big White Self (2006), he claimed the organisation reached a peak of half a million supporters in its heyday.

=== During the end of apartheid ===
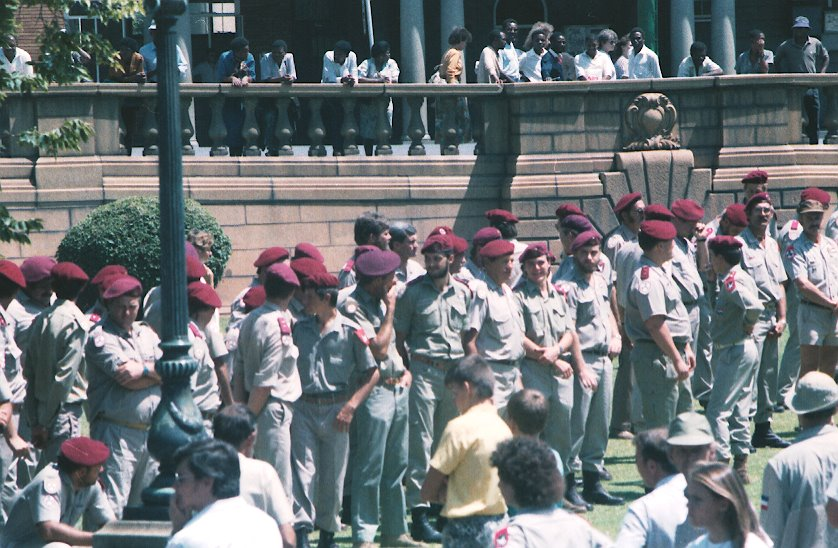
AWB Rally, Church Square, Pretoria, in 1990

During the negotiations that led to South Africa's first non-racial election, the AWB engaged in violence and murder. During the Battle of Ventersdorp in August 1991, the AWB confronted police in front of the town hall where State President F. W. de Klerk was speaking, and "a number of people were killed or injured" in the conflict. Later in the negotiations, the AWB stormed the Kempton Park World Trade Centre where the negotiations were taking place, breaking through the glass front of the building with an armoured car. The police guarding the centre failed to prevent the invasion. The invaders then took over the main conference hall, threatening delegates and painting slogans on the walls, but left again after a short period. Six AWB members were sentenced to death for the murder of four black people at a fake roadblock they set up to terrorise black travellers. On 4 July 1990, members of the AWB detonated an explosive against the Vrye Weekblad newspaper, which they had accused of having a "liberal bias". This was the most serious attack in a string of explosive attacks. It was not until 20 March of the following year that a series of attacks hit the city of Ventersdorp, leaving only material damage.

In 1988, the AWB was beset by scandal when claims that Terre'Blanche had had an affair with journalist Jani Allan surfaced. In July 1989, Cornelius Lottering, a member of a breakaway AWB group Orde van die Dood (Order of Death), attempted to assassinate Allan by placing a bomb outside her Sandton apartment. Nick Broomfield's 1991 documentary The Leader, His Driver and the Driver's Wife claimed that Terre'Blanche had sex with Allan, a claim she denied. This led to Allan taking libel proceedings against the documentary broadcaster Channel 4 in 1992 at the London High Court. During the trial, several transcripts of their alleged unconventional sexual positions appeared in the South African and British press. Terre'Blanche also submitted a sworn statement to the London court denying that he had had an affair with Allan. Although the judge found that Channel 4's allegations had not defamed Allan, he did not rule on whether or not there had been an affair. In November 1993, the AWB signed a solidarity pact with the Inkatha Freedom Party, with the AWB providing the IFP with military training and agreeing that "Boer and Zulu would fight together for freedom and land should they be confronted by a common enemy".

Between 24 and 27 April 1994, AWB members committed a series of four bombings in Johannesburg, Pretoria and Germiston in an attempt to disrupt the multi-racial elections. A total of 20 people were killed and 46 were injured. In the aftermath of the election, 36 AWB members were arrested in connection with the bombings. Nine men were convicted on charges relating to the bombing in 1996. In 1999, amnesty was granted to ten men tied to the bombings by the Truth and Reconciliation Commission.

On 28 April 1994, members of the AWB beat up African-American reporter Michael Allen of The New York Times while covering an AWB mobilization in Rustenburg. Despite the fact that the reporter was punched and kicked by several members of the AWB, his injuries were not serious.

=== Bophuthatswana crisis ===
In 1994, before the advent of majority rule, the AWB gained international notoriety in its attempt to defend the dictatorial government of Lucas Mangope in the homeland of Bophuthatswana. The AWB, along with a contingent of about 90 Afrikaner Volksfront militiamen, entered the capital Mmabatho on 10 and 11 March. The black policemen and soldiers of the Bophuthatswana Defence Force who were out in force to support President Mangope disappeared from the streets in protest at the AWB's actions and later turned on the militiamen at the airport at Mafikeng. One AWB member was shot and killed when the convoy attempted to leave the airport and continue to Mmabatho. When in Mmabatho, the AWB and the Afrikaner Volksfront found themselves under continuous siege from both the Bophuthatswana Defence Force and Mmabatho citizens. When attempting to retreat from Mmabatho on 11 March, three AWB members were summarily killed after they had been wounded in a firefight, by a rogue Bophuthatswana Defence Force member who defected to the ANC. Nearby photojournalists and television news crews recorded the incident, which proved to be a public relations disaster for the AWB, demoralising its White members. The AWB claimed that they were asked into the country and only entered trying to help the Bophuthatswana Government, but the Tebbutt Commission found the "evidence is overwhelming that they entered the area uninvited and that they were not welcome there".

=== Post-apartheid ===
On 24 December 1996, members of the AWB planted two explosive devices at a Shoprite supermarket in Worcester, Western Cape, killing four civilians and wounding 60 more approximately. Only two of the four bombs that had been installed detonated. Despite this the explosion killed four civilians, including three children. It was not until September 2013 when the victims and the perpetrators of the attack spoke, thanks to an initiative of the Victim-Aggressor Dialogue Program.

On 17 June 2001, Terre'Blanche was sentenced to six years in prison for assaulting a petrol station employee, John Ndzima, to such an extent as to cause permanent brain damage, and the attempted murder of a security guard and former employee, Paul Motshabi. Terre'Blanche was released in June 2004 after serving three years in Rooigrond Prison near Mafikeng. During his time in prison, he became a born-again Christian and claimed he had moderated many of his more ethno-nationalist views and preached reconciliation as 'prescribed by God'.

In April 2007, AWB posters appeared at the 13th Klein Karoo National Arts Festival in Oudtshoorn. Several posters made reference to the Bok van Blerk song "De la Rey", an Afrikaans hit record about the Boer General as well as to South Africa's former Coat of Arms. Organisers were quick to remove the posters.

In March 2008, the AWB announced it was re-activating for 'populist' reasons, citing the encouragement of the public. Reasons for their return include: the electricity crisis, corruption across government departments and rampant crime. Plans include a demand for land that they claim is legally theirs in terms of the Sand River Convention of 1852 and other historical treaties, through the International Court of Justice in The Hague if necessary, and if that failed, taking up arms. In April 2008, Terre'Blanche was to be the speaker at several AWB rallies in Vryburg, Middelburg and Pretoria. Several areas in South Africa have been earmarked as part of a future Volkstaat according to three critical title deeds. The areas include Vryheid in KwaZulu-Natal, the old Republics of Stellaland and Goshen in the far North-West and sections of the Free State.

The Mail & Guardian newspaper in 2008 reported that the AWB group had over 5,000 members, and appealed to 18- to 35-year-olds to join the organisation's youth wing. The South African press reported in 2016 that the AWB continued to use social media to recruit new members.

In 2010, Terre'Blanche was murdered by an employee on his farm, and Steyn von Rönge was announced as the new leader of the organisation.

== Leader ==
General Secretary	Took office	Left office
Eugène Terre'Blanche	7 July 1973	3 April 2010
Steyn von Rönge	8 April 2010	

== Logo ==
Triskelion of the AWB

The AWB flag is composed of three black sevens forming a triskelion in a white circle upon a red background, similar to the flag of Nazi Germany. According to AWB, the sevens, 'the number of final victory', 'stand to oppose the number 666, the number of the anti-Christ'. Red is considered to represent Jesus' blood and the struggle of the Christians, while black stands for bravery. The inner white circle symbolises "purity" and "eternal life", paralleling the common symbolism of a halo.

== In fiction ==
The organisation is a popular antagonist amongst writers of alternate history literature. Several members of a fictionalised AWB are important characters in Harry Turtledove's American Civil War alternate history novel The Guns of the South (1992). The AWB also features prominently in Larry Bond's novel of a Cold War-era civil war/international conflict in South Africa, Vortex (1991). It also appears in Richard Herman Jr.'s novel, Iron Gate (1996).

== See also ==
- (Don't) touch me on my studio

Similar groups

- Boerestaat Party
- Vereniging van Oranjewerkers
- Boeremag
- Herstigte Nasionale Party

Separatism

- Orania

Documentary films

- His Big White Self
- The Leader, His Driver and the Driver's Wife
- Louis Theroux's Weird Weekends episode 3.3
- My Beloved Country (1991)

== Sources ==
- Kemp, Arthur (2012). Victory or violence: the story of the AWB of South Africa. Burlington: Ostara Publications. ISBN 978-1-4710-6746-4.
