= Goldstone Commission =

Commission of Inquiry Regarding the Prevention of Public Violence and Intimidation
- Part of the National Peace Accord
- Date: 24 October 1991 to 27 October 1994
- Duration: Three years, three days
- Location: South Africa
- Also known as: Goldstone Commission
- Participants: Richard Goldstone (chair); Danie Rossouw; Solly Sithole; Lillian Baqwa; Gert Steyn

The Goldstone Commission, formally known as the Commission of Inquiry Regarding the Prevention of Public Violence and Intimidation, was appointed on 24 October 1991 to investigate political violence and intimidation in South Africa. Over its three-year lifespan, it investigated incidents occurring between July 1991 and April 1994, when democratic elections were held. The relevant incidents thus occurred during the negotiations to end apartheid. The Commission's mandate was both to investigate the causes of the violence and to recommend measures to contain or prevent it.

The Commission played a critical role in defusing the political violence that erupted when apartheid in South Africa began eroding in the late 1980s as the country moved toward its first democratic elections, and concluded that political violence was fuelled by a 'third force'.

The Commission was established in terms of the Prevention of Public Violence and Intimidation Act of 1991, as a condition of the National Peace Accord of September 1991. President F. W. de Klerk appointed Justice Richard Goldstone to chair it. It operated from 24 October 1991 to 27 October 1994 and, over that period, submitted 47 reports to the President. The Commission was fairly large: its investigation team, set up in 1992, comprised five units, staffed by 13 police officers, ten attorneys, and five international observers. It had offices in Johannesburg, Durban, Port Elizabeth, Cape Town, and East London.

Some of the Commission's reports focused on broad thematic concerns, such as taxi violence (to which seven separate reports were dedicated) or the effects of political violence on children. Others investigated specific allegations or events, among them some of the most prominent incidents of political violence of the period, including the Boipatong massacre, the Bisho massacre, the storming of the Kempton Park World Trade Centre, and the Shell House massacre. Several reports investigated the role of the South African Police and South African Defence Force in political violence, and particular public attention was given to the May 1993 report on allegations of a third force, as well as to related reports such the report of the Malcolm Wallis-led subcommittee on the causes of the violence between the African National Congress and Inkatha.

== Commissioners ==
The Commissioners were:

- Richard Goldstone
- Danie Rossouw
- Solly Sithole
- Lillian Baqwa
- Gert Steyn

Other individuals served on multi-national panels, acted as observers, or participated in committees under the Commission.

== Investigations ==
List of investigations and reports by the Commission
Topic	Date of report
General	24 January 1992
General	29 April 1992
General	21 December 1992
General	6 December 1993
General	30 May 1994
General	27 October 1994
Violence at Mooi River on 3–4 December 1991	19 February 1992
Violence at Mooi River on 3–4 December 1991	19 February 1992
Violence at Mooi River on 3–4 December 1991	21 December 1992
Violence at President Steyn Goldmine in Welkom in November 1991	28 February 1992
Taxi violence	27 May 1992
Taxi violence	2 July 1992
Taxi violence	4 December 1992
Taxi violence	23 January 1993
Taxi violence	26 July 1993
Taxi violence	26 July 1994
Taxi violence	24 August 1994
Conduct of the 32 Battalion at Phola Park on 8 April 1992	10 June 1992
Train violence	8 July 1992
Train violence	6 May 1993
Waddington Committee: Police response to the Boipatong massacre	20 July 1992
Violence in hostels	21 September 1992
Bisho massacre	29 September 1992
Role of the South African Police in violence in the Vaal area	27 October 1992
Violence in Tokoza	17 November 1992
Allegations about Renamo soldiers in KwaZulu	15 December 1992
Regulation of gatherings	15 January 1993
Regulation of gatherings	28 April 1993
Activities of the Azanian People's Liberation Army	15 March 1993
Allegations of a third force	27 May 1993
South African Defence Force, including 1986 Caprivi training of Inkatha supporters	1 June 1993
Events after the assassination of Chris Hani	29 June 1993
Storming of the World Trade Centre	13 July 1993
Curbing of violence and intimidation during the forthcoming election	11 August 1993
Illegal importation, distribution, and use of firearms, ammunition and explosives	5 October 1993
Violence in Mossel Bay in July 1993	12 October 1993
Violence in Crossroads in March to June 1993	11 November 1993
Shooting in Katlehong on 9 January 1994	18 January 1994
Criminal political violence by the South African Police, the Kwazulu Police, and Inkatha	18 March 1994
Wallis Committee: Inkatha-African National Congress conflict, and special matters	18 March 1994
Wallis Committee: Inkatha-African National Congress conflict, and special matters	18 March 1994
Attack on Power Park squatter camp on 27 July 1993	11 May 1994
Shell House massacre	21 April 1994
Attacks on members of the South African Police	21 April 1994
Attempted purchase of firearms by the KwaZulu government from Eskom	22 April 1994
Effects of public violence and intimidation on children	10 August 1994
Effects of public violence and intimidation on children	27 October 1994
