= Area (journal) =

- Discipline: Geography
- Language: English
- Edited by: Kavita Datta, Peter Kraftl and Rob Bryant

Publication details
- History: 1969–present
- Publisher: Wiley-Blackwell on behalf of the Royal Geographical Society (United Kingdom)
- Frequency: Quarterly
- Impact factor: 1.203 (2014)

Standard abbreviations
- ISO 4: Area

Indexing
- CODEN: AREAB6
- ISSN: 0004-0894 (print); 1475-4762 (web)
- LCCN: 76014310
- OCLC no.: 46697281

Links
- Journal homepage; Online access; Online archive

Area is a peer-reviewed academic journal published by Wiley-Blackwell on behalf of the Royal Geographical Society. According to the Journal Citation Reports, the journal has a 2014 impact factor of 1.203.
