= Orde van die Dood =

Militant offshoot of the Afrikaner Resistance Movement

The Orde van die Dood (Afrikaans: Order of Death or Order of the Dead) was a militant offshoot of the Afrikaner Resistance Movement (Afrikaner Weerstandsbeweging) which sought to create a white Boer homeland (Volkstaat) in South Africa, beginning in the 1990s.

The movement gained exposure in 1989 when member Cornelius Lottering attempted to assassinate the journalist Jani Allan with a bomb. Lottering was taken to court for charges including killing a black South African taxi driver, Potoko Makgalemele, for OvdD initiation purposes. Lottering was convicted of the murder, but was granted amnesty for the robberies he committed to help finance the OvdD, and of escaping from custody.
