= Nyaradzayi Gumbonzvanda =

Zimbabwean human rights activist

Nyaradzayi Gumbonzvanda is a Zimbabwean human rights activist and lawyer. She is a United Nations Assistant Secretary-General and as the United Nations Women Deputy Executive Director for Normative Support, UN System Coordination, and Programme Results.

== Early life and education ==
Nyaradzayi Gumbonzvanda was born in and grew up in Magaya Village in Murehwa, Zimbabwe. In 1978, Gumbonzvanda's father died from a natural illness. From 1978 to 1980, her local school was closed due to the ongoing Rhodesian Bush War. Gumbonzvanda's family could not afford a private education, so she did not attend school for those years. Gumbonzvanda has cited this experience, the marriage of her parents occurring when her mother was 15, her brothers' deaths from HIV, and witnessing one of her sisters marry at the age of 16 as personal influences on her activism.

She holds a master's degree in Private Law from the University of South Africa. She completed post-graduate work on conflict resolution at Uppsala University in Sweden. Gumbonzvanda also holds a Doctor of Laws degree from the University of Massachusetts and an Bachelor of Laws degree from the University of Zimbabwe. She was married in Takawira village in Madziwa.

== Career ==
Gumbonzvanda has been a human rights activist for over two decades. Her work has focused on violence against women, sexual and reproductive health and rights, and justice. Gumbonzvanda began her career in law. Between 1998 and 2001, Gumbonzvanda was a Human Rights Officer in Liberia and a National Child Rights Adviser for the United Nations Children's Fund (UNICEF). Gumbonzvanda then held the position of Regional Director in the East and Horn of Africa for UNIFEM from 2001 to 2007.

In 2007, she founded and was chief executive of the organization Rozaria Memorial Trust. The Murewa-based organization primarily focuses on promoting girls' access to reproductive and sexual health services. The Trust was founded in memory of and named after Gumbonzvanda's mother.

Also in 2007, Gumbonzvanda became General Secretary for the World Young Women's Christian Association, a nonprofit for the empowerment of women and girls. She remained General Secretary until 2016. In 2014, Gumbonzvanda was appointed the first African Union Goodwill Ambassador on Ending Childhood Marriage, a position she held until 2022. In 2021, Gumbonzvanda was awarded a Hillary Rodham Clinton Award by the Georgetown Institute for Women, Peace, and Security for her work advocating for gender equality and ending child marriage. In 2023, she won SOAWR's SGBV, VAWG & Ending Harmful Practices Award for her involvement in developing and popularizing the Maputo Protocol. On February 6, 2024, she began her role as UN Assistant Secretary-General and UN Women Deputy Executive Director for Normative Support, UN System Coordination, and Programme Results.

Gumbonzvanda has written several articles regarding human rights that have been published in the Huffpost and Al Jazeera
