= Battle of Ventersdorp =

1991 violent incident in Ventersdorp, South Africa

- Part of the negotiations to end apartheid in South Africa
Date	9 August 1991
Location	Ventersdorp, Transvaal, South Africa
Result	South African government victory

Belligerents
AWB	South African Police

Commanders and leaders
Eugène Terre'Blanche	Hernus Kriel

Strength
2,000	Unknown

Casualties and losses
3 killed 13 wounded	6 wounded
- 1 civilian killed, 29 civilians wounded

The Battle of Ventersdorp was a violent confrontation on 9 August 1991 in the South African town of Ventersdorp between supporters of the far-right Afrikaner Weerstandsbeweging (AWB) and the South African Police and security forces. Though technically not a "battle", it became known as such in the media while official sources such as the Truth and Reconciliation Commission (TRC) simply refer to it as an "incident". Much of its notoriety lies in the fact that it marked the first occasion the South African security forces used lethal force against right-wing white protesters since the National Party's ascension to power in 1948.

== Background ==
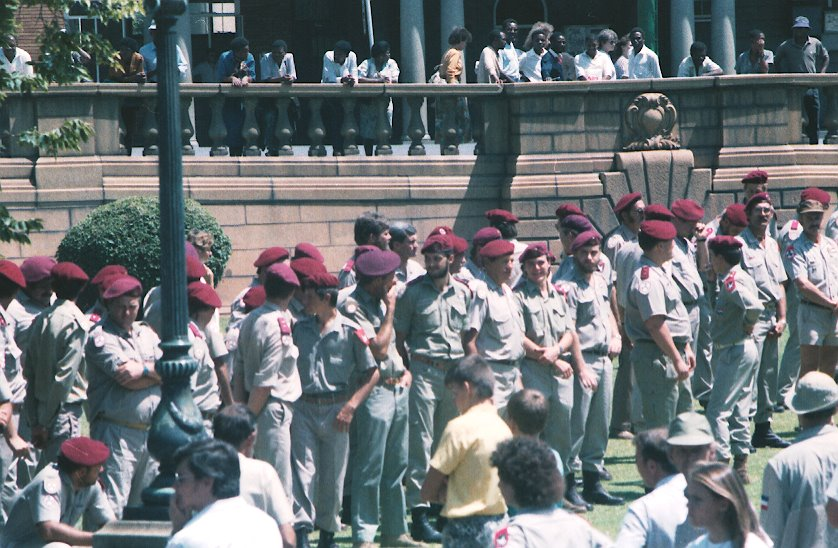
AWB Rally, Church Square, Pretoria in 1990.

The confrontation took place outside the Ventersdorp town hall where then State President F.W. de Klerk was scheduled to hold a public address. Ventersdorp was then a political stronghold of the right-wing Afrikaner Weerstandsbeweging (AWB), which had opposed de Klerk's decision to recognise the African National Congress and release Nelson Mandela the previous year. The town was inundated by angry AWB supporters the day of de Klerk's speech, including some carrying arms. The South African Police responded by setting up roadblocks and confiscating weapons. Tensions were running high between the police and the AWB due to a previous incident on 11 May 1991, when a group of policemen wounded four AWB militants attempting to drive black squatters off a Ventersdorp farm.

== Confrontation ==
The AWB supporters numbered 2,000. They were armed with hunting rifles and pistols and wore protective items to shield them from the effects of an inevitable tear gas attack by the riot police. The police equalled the AWB in number, but were considerably better trained and equipped.

Many unconventional tactics were employed by the AWB. They allegedly wore plaster of Paris on their limbs to protect them from police dogs. Video footage shows AWB members locking arms and carrying rags and vinegar to lessen the effects of tear gas.

Once the AWB cut the electricity and fired on the police, the police were ordered to shoot to kill. Three policemen were wounded, none of them fatally, while the police killed one AWB member. The AWB also fired into a police minibus. Two AWB members were killed and 13 were injured when the police returned fire from the minibus. Terre'Blanche made a point of appearing in front on television cameras and said (in Afrikaans), "Where is De Klerk? I want to talk to him. He came here armed. Here lies a man on the ground and over there lies a man" (referring to injured policemen).

In all, three AWB members and one passer-by were killed. Six policemen, 13 AWB members, and 29 civilians were injured.

== Aftermath ==
The growing conflict between right-wing groupings and the government has been identified as one of the most significant developments in the course of 1991, with the Battle of Ventersdorp as its high point.

The events in Ventersdorp, as well as gains by the right-wing opposition in white by-elections, led De Klerk to call a referendum in March 1992. The referendum confirmed white support for the negotiation process, despite continued opposition from the far right.

Following the end of apartheid, Terre'Blanche and his supporters sought amnesty for the Battle of Ventersdorp and other acts. Amnesty was granted by the Truth and Reconciliation Commission.

The three dead AWB members, A. F. Badenhorst, G. J. Koen and J. D. Conradie, were honoured at an AWB ceremony in October 1994, in Ventersdorp. A monument still remembers their death.
