= Negotiations to end apartheid in South Africa =

1990–93 summits to end formal segregation and racial discrimination policies

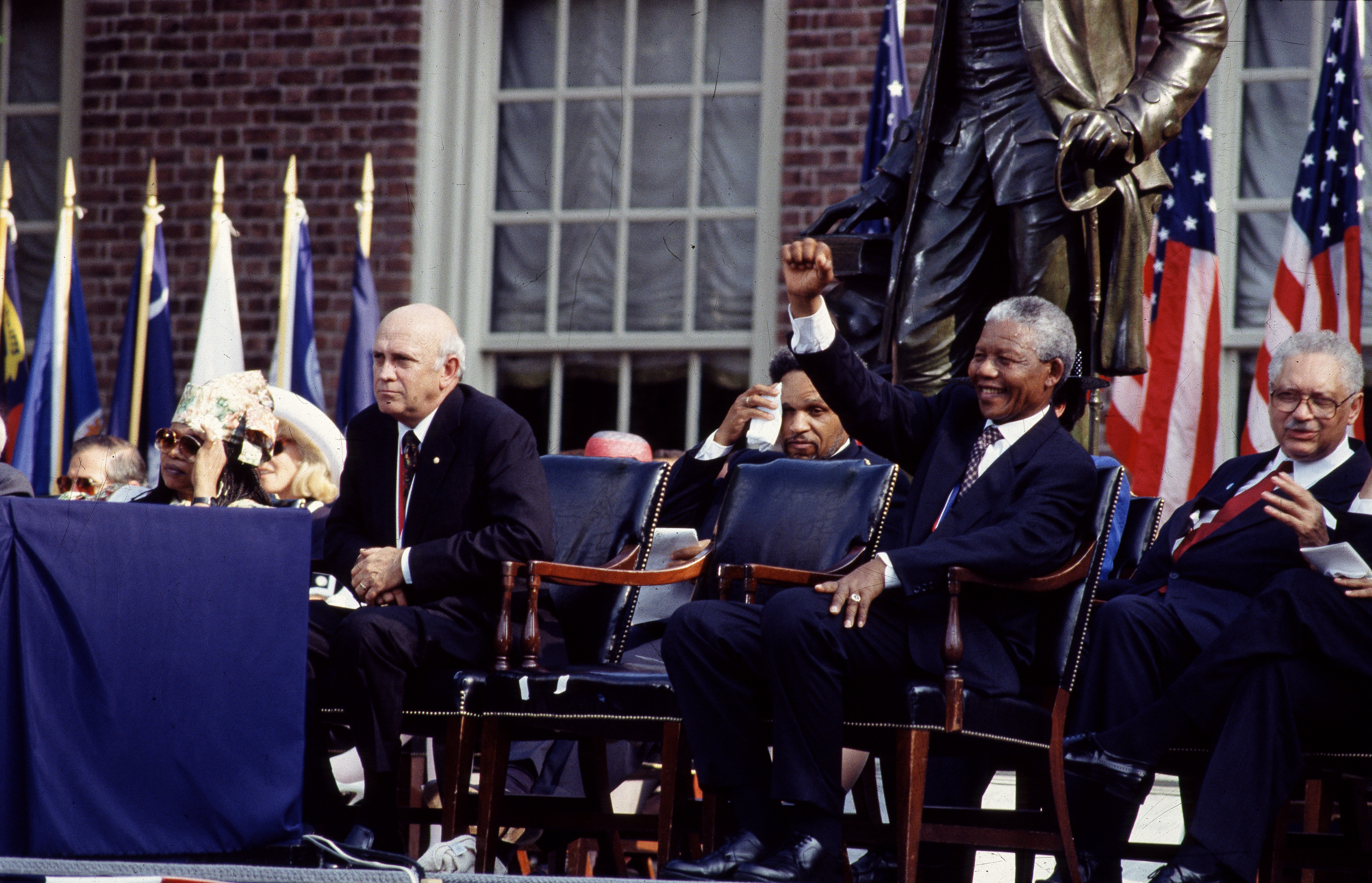
F. W. de Klerk and Nelson Mandela in July 1993, near the close of negotiations, in Philadelphia, Pennsylvania wait to jointly receive the Liberty Medal.

The apartheid system in South Africa was ended through a series of bilateral and multi-party negotiations between 1990 and 1993. The negotiations culminated in the passage of a new interim Constitution in 1993, a precursor to the Constitution of 1996; and in South Africa's first non-racial elections in 1994, won by the African National Congress (ANC) liberation movement.

Although there had been gestures towards negotiations in the 1970s and 1980s, the process accelerated in 1990, when the government of F. W. de Klerk took a number of unilateral steps towards reform, including releasing Nelson Mandela from prison and unbanning the ANC and other political organisations. In 1990–91, bilateral "talks about talks" between the ANC and the government established the pre-conditions for substantive negotiations, codified in the Groote Schuur Minute and Pretoria Minute. The first multi-party agreement on the desirability of a negotiated settlement was the 1991 National Peace Accord, consolidated later that year by the establishment of the multi-party Convention for a Democratic South Africa (CODESA). However, the second plenary session of CODESA, in May 1992, encountered stubborn deadlock over questions of regional autonomy, political and cultural self-determination, and the constitution-making process itself.

The ANC returned to a programme of mass action, hoping to leverage its popular support, only to withdraw from negotiations entirely in June 1992 after the Boipatong massacre. The massacre revived pre-existing, and enduring, concerns about state complicity in political violence, possibly through the use of a state-sponsored third force bent on destabilisation. Indeed, political violence was nearly continuous throughout the negotiations – white extremists and separatists launched periodic attacks, and there were regular clashes between supporters of the ANC and supporters of the Inkatha Freedom Party (IFP). However, intensive bilateral talks led to a new bilateral Record of Understanding, signed between the ANC and the government in September 1992, which prepared the way for the ultimately successful Multi-Party Negotiating Forum of April–November 1993.

Although the ANC and the governing National Party were the main figures in the negotiations, they encountered serious difficulties building consensus not only among their own constituencies but among other participating groups, notably left-wing black groups, right-wing white groups, and the conservative leaders of the independent homelands and KwaZulu homeland. Several groups, including the IFP, boycotted the tail-end of the negotiations, but the most important among them ultimately agreed to participate in the 1994 elections.

== Background ==
Apartheid was a system of racial discrimination and segregation employed by the South African government. It was formalised in 1948, forming a framework for political and economic dominance by the white population and severely restricting the political rights of the black majority.

Between 1960 and 1990, the African National Congress and other mainly black opposition political organisations were banned. As the National Party cracked down on black opposition to apartheid, most leaders of ANC and other opposition organisations were either killed, imprisoned, or went into exile.

However, increasing local and international pressure on the government, as well as the realisation that apartheid could neither be maintained by force forever nor overthrown by the opposition without considerable suffering, eventually led both sides to the negotiating table. The Tripartite Accord, which brought an end to the South African Border War in neighbouring Angola and Namibia, created a window of opportunity to create the enabling conditions for a negotiated settlement, recognized by Niel Barnard of the National Intelligence Service.

=== Mahlabatini Declaration of Faith: January 1974 ===
On 4 January 1974, Harry Schwarz, leader of the liberal-reformist wing of the United Party, met with Gatsha (later Mangosuthu) Buthelezi, Chief Executive Councillor of the black homeland of KwaZulu and signed a five-point plan for racial peace in South Africa, which came to be known as the Mahlabatini Declaration of Faith.

Signers of the Mahlabatini Declaration

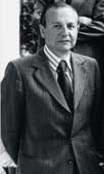
Harry Schwarz

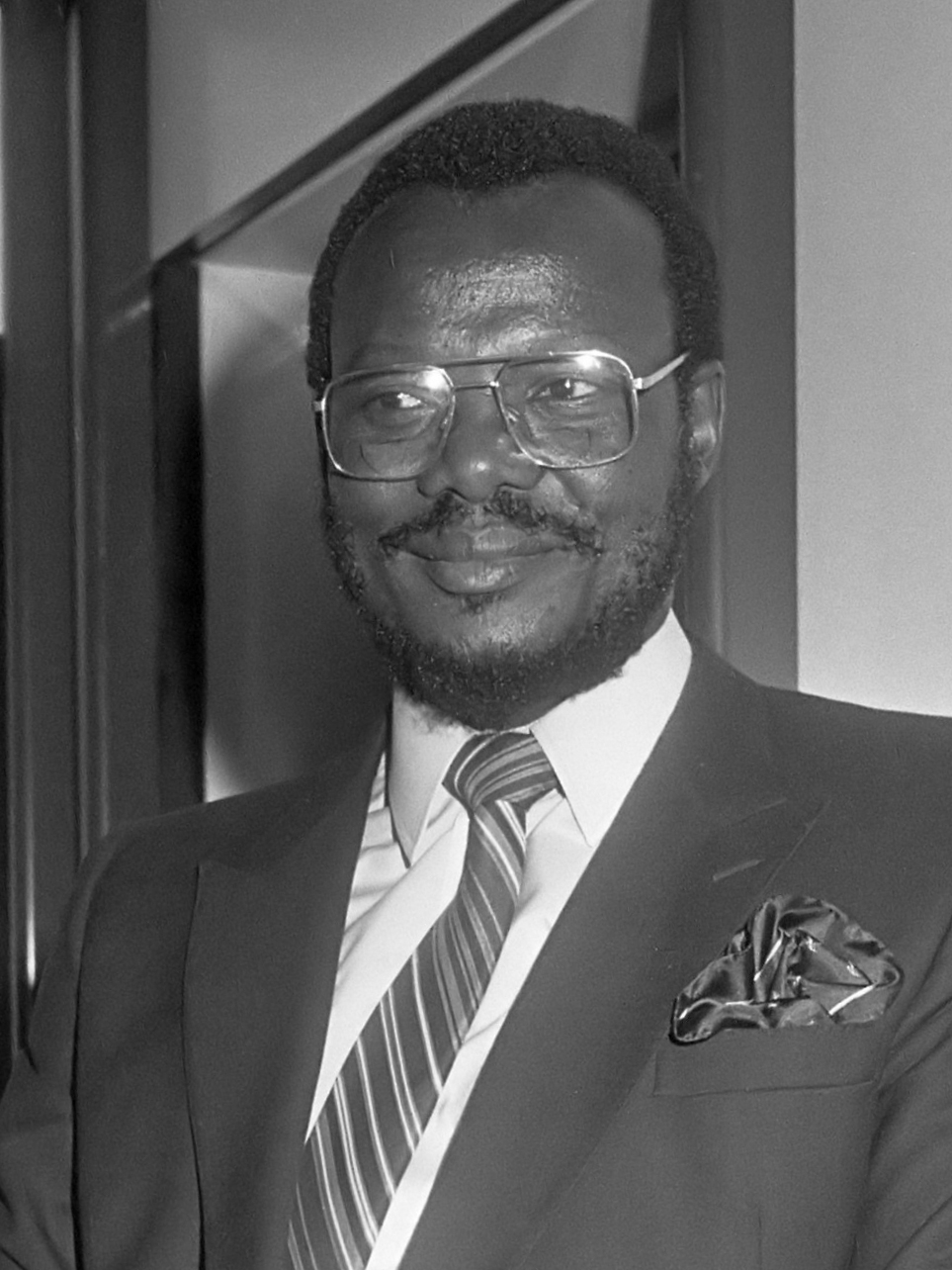
Gatsha Buthelezi

The declaration stated that "the situation of South Africa in the world scene as well as internal community relations requires, in our view, an acceptance of certain fundamental concepts for the economic, social, and constitutional development of our country." It called for negotiations involving all peoples, in order to draw up constitutional proposals stressing opportunity for all with a Bill of Rights to safeguard these rights. It suggested that the federal concept was the appropriate framework for such changes to take place. It also affirmed that political change must take place through non-violent means.

The declaration was the first of such agreements by acknowledged black and white political leaders in South Africa that affirmed to these principles. The commitment to the peaceful pursuit of political change was declared at a time when neither the National Party nor the African National Congress was looking to peaceful solutions or dialogue. The declaration was heralded by the English speaking press as a breakthrough in race relations in South Africa. Shortly after it was issued, the declaration was endorsed by several chief ministers of the black homelands, including Cedric Phatudi (Lebowa), Lucas Mangope (Bophuthatswana) and Hudson Nisanwisi (Gazankulu). Despite considerable support from black leaders, the English speaking press and liberal figures such as Alan Paton, the declaration saw staunch opposition from the National Party, the Afrikaans press and the conservative wing of Harry Schwarz's United Party.

=== Early contact: 1980s ===
The very first meetings between the South African Government and Nelson Mandela were driven by the National Intelligence Service (NIS) under the leadership of Niel Barnard and his Deputy Director General, Mike Louw. These meetings were secret in nature and were designed to develop an understanding about whether there were sufficient common grounds for future peace talks. As these meetings evolved, a level of trust developed between the key actors (Barnard, Louw, and Mandela). To facilitate future talks while preserving secrecy needed to protect the process, Barnard arranged for Mandela to be moved off Robben Island to Pollsmoor Prison in 1982. This provided Mandela with more comfortable lodgings, but also gave easier access in a way that could not be compromised. Barnard therefore brokered an initial agreement in principle about what became known as "talks about talks." It was at this stage that the process was elevated from a secret engagement to a more public engagement.

In October 1985 the Cape Times published an interview with the then banned leader of the ANC, Oliver Tambo. Although the South African government arrested the Cape Times editor, Tony Heard, for conducting and publishing the interview it was important for setting the political ground work for a negotiated settlement. It allowed the ANC to present itself to the White South African public as a moderate and non-racial interlocutor contrary to their portrayal by the South African government as radical communist Black nationalists.

The first less-tentative meeting between Mandela and the National Party government came while P. W. Botha was State President. In November 1985, Minister Kobie Coetsee met Mandela in the hospital while Mandela was being treated for prostate surgery. Over the next four years, a series of tentative meetings took place, laying the groundwork for further contact and future negotiations, but little real progress was made and the meetings remained secret until several years later.

As the secret talks bore fruit and the political engagement started to take place, the National Intelligence Service withdrew from centre stage in the process and moved to a new phase of operational support work. This new phase was designed to test public opinion about a negotiated solution. Central to this planning was an initiative that became known in Security Force circles as the Dakar Safari, which saw a number of prominent Afrikaner opinion-makers engage with the African National Congress (ANC) in Dakar, Senegal, and Leverkusen, Germany at events organized by the Institute for Democratic Alternatives in South Africa. The operational objective of this meeting was not to understand the opinions of the actors themselves—that was very well known at this stage within strategic management circles—but rather to gauge public opinion about a movement away from the previous security posture of confrontation and repression to a new posture based on engagement and accommodation.

=== Reforms announced: February 1990 ===
When F. W. de Klerk became president in 1989, he was able to build on the previous secret negotiations with Mandela. The first significant steps towards formal negotiations took place in February 1990 when, in his speech at the opening of Parliament, de Klerk announced the repeal of the ban on the ANC and other banned political organisations, as well as Mandela's release after 27 years in prison. Mandela was released on 11 February 1990 and direct talks between the ANC and the government were scheduled to begin on 11 April. However, on 26 March, 11 protestors were killed by police in the Sebokeng massacre, and the ANC announced on 31 March that it intended to pull out of the negotiations indefinitely. The talks were only rescheduled after an emergency meeting between Mandela and de Klerk, held in early April.

== Early "talks about talks" ==
=== Groote Schuur Minute: May 1990 ===
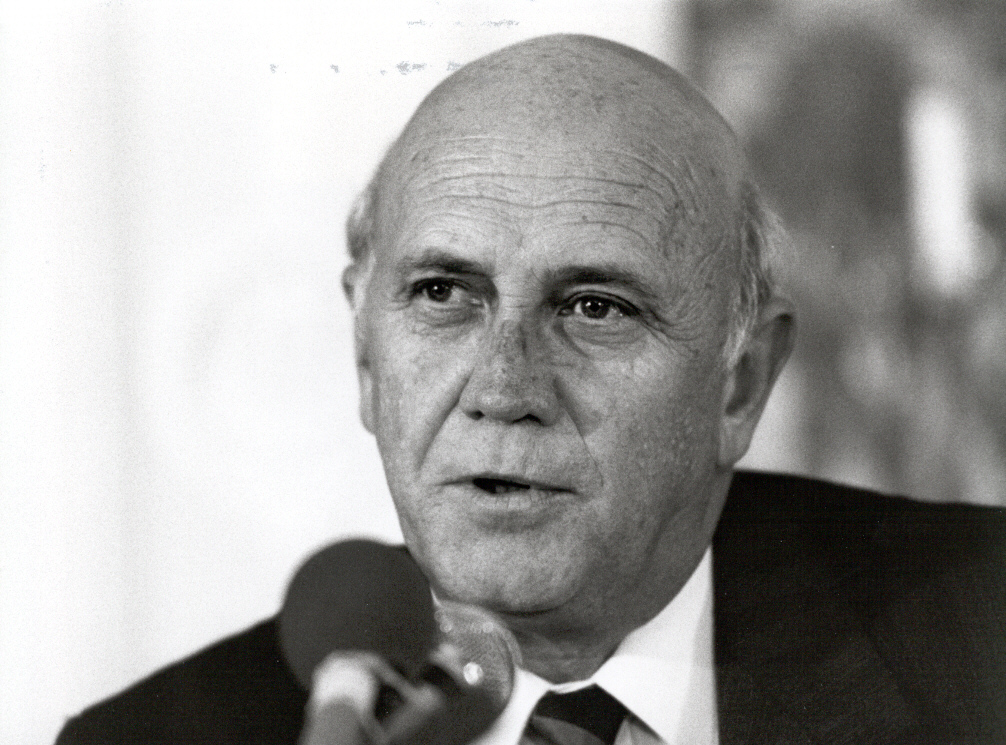
South African President F. W. de Klerk in May 1990.

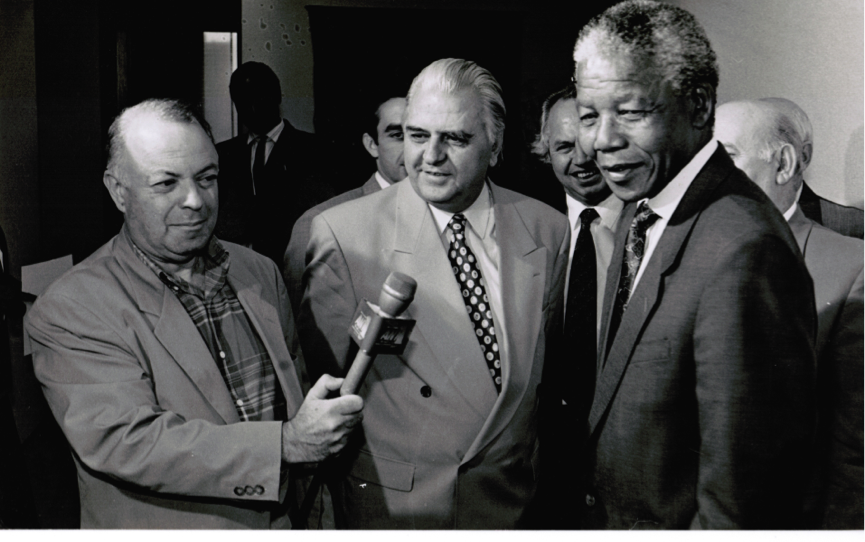
Nelson Mandela (right) gives one of his first press interviews after his release from prison in February 1990.

On 2–4 May 1990, the ANC met with the South African government at the Groote Schuur presidential residence in Cape Town, in what were touted as the first of several "talks about talks", intended to negotiate the terms for more substantive negotiations. After the first day of meetings, a joint statement was released which identified the factors held by the parties to constitute obstacles to further negotiations: the government was concerned primarily about the ANC's ongoing commitment to armed struggle, while the ANC listed six preliminary demands, including the release of political prisoners, the return of ANC activists from exile, and the lifting of the state of emergency. The outcome of the talks was a joint communiqué known as the Groote Schuur Minute, which was released on 4 May and which canvassed, though rarely in decisive terms, many of the seven obstacles that had been identified. The minute consisted primarily in a commitment by both parties to "the resolution of the existing climate of violence and intimidation from whatever quarter as well as a commitment to stability and to a peaceful process of negotiations". The parties agreed to establish a working group, which should aim to complete its work before 21 May and which would consider the terms under which retroactive immunity would be granted for political offences. The government also committed to review its security legislation to "ensure normal and free political activities".

=== Pretoria Minute: August 1990 ===
Tensions between the parties were piqued in late July, when several senior members of the ANC were arrested because of their involvement in Operation Vula, an ongoing clandestine ANC operation inside the country. Police raids also turned up Operation Vula material which de Klerk believed substantiated his concerns about the sincerity of the ANC's commitment to negotiations and about its intimacy with the South African Communist Party (SACP). Following another meeting between Mandela and de Klerk on 26 July, intensive bilateral talks were held on 6 August in Pretoria, resulting in another joint communiqué, the Pretoria Minute. The minute reiterated and extended earlier pledges by the government to consider amending its security legislation and lifting the state of emergency (then ongoing only in Natal province); and it also committed the government to releasing certain categories of political prisoners from September and indemnifying certain categories of political offences from October. Most significantly, however, the minute included a commitment to the immediate and unilateral suspension of all armed activities by the ANC and its armed wing, Umkhonto we Sizwe.

=== D. F. Malan Accord: February 1991 ===
The Pretoria Minute was followed on 12 February 1991 by the D. F. Malan Accord, which contained commitments arising from the activities of the working group on political offences, and which also clarified the terms of the ANC's suspension of armed struggle. It specified that the ANC would not launch attacks, create underground structures, threaten or incite violence, infiltrate men and materials into the country, or train men for armed action inside the country. This concession was already unpopular with important segments of the ANC's support base, and the situation was further unsettled by the continuation of political violence in parts of the country, particularly in Natal and certain Transvaal townships, where ANC and IFP supporters periodically clashed. In early April 1991, the ANC imposed an ultimatum, threatening to suspend all negotiations unless the government took steps to reduce the violence. Its case was strengthened by a major scandal in July 1991, known as Inkathagate, which unravelled after journalist David Beresford published evidence, obtained from a Security Branch informant, that the government had been subsidising the IFP.

=== National Peace Accord: September 1991 ===
On 14 September 1991, twenty-six organisations signed the National Peace Accord. The first multi-party agreement towards negotiations, it did not resolve substantive questions about the nature of the post-apartheid settlement, but did include guidelines for the conduct of political organisations and security forces. To address the ongoing political violence, it established multi-party conflict resolution structures (or "sub-committees") at the community level, as well as related structures at the national level, notably the Goldstone Commission. The accord prepared the way for multi-party negotiations, under the organisation that came to be called the Convention for a Democratic South Africa (CODESA).

== Convention for a Democratic South Africa (CODESA) ==
=== Composition ===
19 groups were represented at CODESA: the South African government and the governments of the so-called TBVC states (the nominally independent homelands of Transkei, Bophuthatswana, Venda, and Ciskei); the three main political players – the ANC, the IFP, and the NP (represented separately to the government, although holding identical positions to it); and a further variety of political groups. These were the SACP, the Democratic Party, the Dikwankwetla Party, the Inyandza National Movement (of KaNgwane), the Intando Yesizwe Party (of KwaNdebele), the Labour Party, the Transvaal and Natal Indian Congress, the National People's Party, Solidarity, the United People's Front, and the Ximoko Progressive Party. However, the negotiations were boycotted by organisations both on the far left (notably the Pan-Africanist Congress (PAC) and Azanian People's Organisation) and on far right (notably the Conservative Party and the Herstigte Nasionale Party). Buthelezi personally, though not the IFP, boycotted the sessions, in protest of the steering committee's decision not to allow a separate delegation representing the Zulu monarch, Goodwill Zwelithini. And South Africa's largest labour grouping, the Congress of South African Trade Unions, applied for but was denied permission to participate at CODESA; instead, its interests were to be represented indirectly by its Tripartite Alliance partners, the ANC and SACP.

CODESA working groups:

1. Creation of a climate for free and fair elections
2. Constitutional principles and guidelines for a constitution-making body
3. Transitional mechanisms and transitional government structures
4. Re-incorporation of the TBVC states
5. Implementation, process, and time frames

In addition to a secretariat – led by Mac Maharaj of the ANC and Fanie van der Merwe of the government – and a management committee, CODESA I comprised five working groups, which became the main negotiating forums during CODESA's lifespan and each of which was dedicated to a specific issue. Each working group included two delegates and two advisors from each of the 19 parties, as well as a chairperson appointed on a rotational basis. Each had a steering committee and some had further sub-committees. Agreements reached at the working group level were subject to ratification by the CODESA plenary.

=== CODESA I: December 1991 ===
CODESA held two plenary sessions, both at the World Trade Centre in Kempton Park outside Johannesburg. The first plenary was held on 20–21 December 1991; was chaired by judges Michael Corbett, Petrus Shabort, and Ismail Mahomed; and was broadcast live on television. On the first day, all 19 participants signed a Declaration of Intent, assenting to be bound by certain initial principles and by further agreements reached at CODESA. Notwithstanding various enduring sticking points, the extent of agreement reached at CODESA I was remarkable. Participants agreed that South Africa was to be a united, democratic, and non-racial state, with adherence to a separation of powers, with a supreme constitution and judicially enforceable bill of rights, with regular multi-party elections under a system of proportional representation, and with a common South African citizenship. Disagreements about how these provisos were to be implemented, however – and, for example, what exactly was entailed by a unified state or by proportional representation – continued to occupy, and to obstruct, the working groups well into 1992.

=== CODESA II: May 1992 ===
The second plenary session, CODESA II, convened on 15 May 1992 at the World Trade Centre to canvas the progress made by the working groups. In the interim, electoral losses by the NP to the Conservative Party had led de Klerk to call a whites-only referendum on 17 March 1992, which demonstrated overwhelming support among the white minority for reforms and a negotiated settlement and which had therefore solidified his mandate to proceed. However, de Klerk's triumph in the referendum did not curtail – and may have inflamed – political violence, including among the white right-wing; nor did it resolve the deadlock that the working groups had arrived at on certain key questions. The most important elements of the deadlock arose from the work of the second working group, whose mandate was to devise constitutional principles and guidelines for the constitution-making process. In terms of the content of the constitutional principles, the ANC favoured a highly centralised government with strict limitations on regional autonomy, while the IFP and NP advocated for federal systems of slightly different kinds, but with strong, built-in guarantees for the representation of minority interests. For example, the NP's preferred proposal was for a bicameral legislature whose upper house would incorporate a veto for minority groups, to exist alongside a bill of rights with specific protections for so-called group rights. The ANC viewed such proposals as attempts to dilute majority rule and possibly to allow the maintenance of de facto apartheid in the country's minority-majority regions.

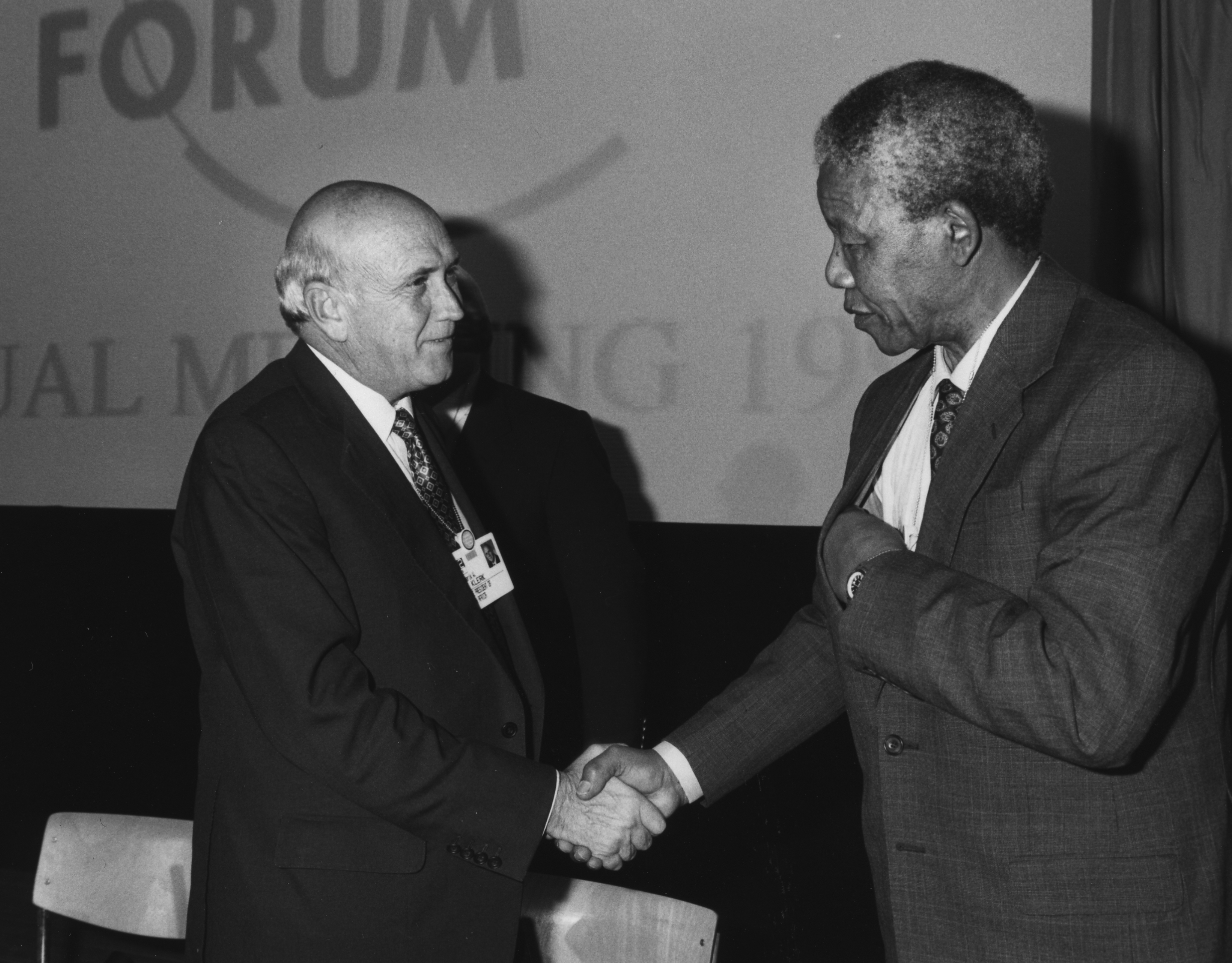
De Klerk and Mandela at the World Economic Forum in January 1992, shortly after CODESA I.

Perhaps even more obstructive were disagreements about how the constitution itself was to be devised and passed into law. The ANC's enduring proposal had been that the task should be entrusted to a constituent assembly, democratically elected under the principle of one man, one vote. Although it recognised that the white minority would not abide a constitution-making process without any guarantees of its outcomes, the ANC believed that the pre-agreement of constitutional principles at CODESA should suffice for such guarantees. On the other hand, the NP held that the constitution should be negotiated among parties, in a forum resembling CODESA, and then adopted by the existing (and NP-dominated) legislature – both to protect minority interests, and to ensure legal continuity. Alternatively, if a constituent assembly was unavoidable, it insisted that approval of the new constitution should require the support of a three-quarters majority in the assembly, rather than the two-thirds majority proposed by the ANC. Thereafter, it sought a transitional system of government under a compulsory coalition, with the cabinet drawn equally from each of the three major parties and a presidency that would rotate among them. The IFP also opposed the notion of a democratically elected constituent assembly, although for different reasons.

As a result of this deadlock, with consensus evidently out of reach, discussions stalled and the plenary was dissolved on the second day of meetings, 16 May – although the parties reaffirmed their commitment to the Declaration of Intent, and expected to re-convene once the major disagreements had been resolved outside the plenary.

== Breakdown of negotiations ==
=== Return to mass action: June–August 1992 ===
With CODESA stalled, the ANC announced its return to a programme of "rolling mass action", aimed at consolidating – and decisively demonstrating – the level of popular support for its agenda in the constitutional negotiations. The programme began with a nationwide stay-away on 16 June, the anniversary of the 1976 Soweto uprising. It was overshadowed when later that week, on 17–18 June 1992, 45 residents of Boipatong, Gauteng were killed, primarily by Zulu hostel dwellers, in the Boipatong massacre. Amid broader suspicions of state-sponsored so-called third force involvement in the ongoing political violence, the ANC accused the government of complicity in the attack and announced, on 24 June, that it was withdrawing from negotiations until such time as the government took steps to restore its trust. Lamenting that the massacre had thrown South Africa "back to the Sharpeville days", Mandela suggested that trust might be restored by specific measures to curtail political violence, including regulating workers' hostels, banning cultural weapons like the spears favoured by the IFP, and prosecuting state security personnel implicated in violence.

Our country is on the brink of disaster. First there is the crisis in the negotiation process itself. The central blockage stems from the refusal of the NP government to move together with all of us in the process of truly democratising South Africa. Secondly, the continuing direct and indirect involvement of the NP government, the state security forces and the police in the violence as well as your unwillingness to act decisively to bring such violence to an end has created an untenable and explosive situation... [T]he NP government has been pursuing the path of embracing the shell of a democratic South Africa while seeking to ensure that it is not democratic in content.

— Memo from Mandela to de Klerk, 26 June 1992

In the aftermath of the massacre, the ANC capitalised on public sentiment to further promote its mass action campaign, and also harnessed the increased international attention – on 15 July, Mandela addressed a meeting of the United Nations (UN) Security Council in New York about state complicity in political violence, leading to a UN observer mission and ultimately to additional UN support for various transitional structures, including the Goldstone Commission. The political impetus for a negotiated solution was given further urgency after the Bisho massacre on 7 September, in which the Ciskei Defence Force killed 28 ANC supporters.

=== Record of Understanding: September 1992 ===
For the month following 21 August 1992, representatives of the ANC and the government met to discuss the resumption of negotiations. Specifically, the government was represented by the Minister of Constitutional Development, Roelf Meyer, and the ANC by its Secretary General, Cyril Ramaphosa. Through intensive informal discussions, Meyer and Ramaphosa struck up a famous friendship. Their informal meetings were followed by a full bilateral summit in Johannesburg on 26 September 1992, which resulted in a Record of Understanding. The agreement improved relations between the parties to the extent that both delegations sent key members to two bosberaads (Afrikaans for "bush summits" or retreats) that summer.

The document asserted a shared desire to reopen negotiations and reflected at least partial resolutions to many of the major disagreements which had led to CODESA's collapse. On political violence, the parties agreed to further engagements, to a ban on carrying dangerous weapons in public, and to security measures at a specific list of hostels which had been identified as "problematic". The government also agreed to further extend the indemnity granted to political prisoners and to accelerate their release. The ANC, meanwhile, committed to easing tensions and to consulting its constituency "with a view to examine" its mass action programme. Most importantly, the Record of Understanding resolved the most obstructive disagreements between the parties about the form of the constitution-making process and the nature of the post-apartheid state. In a major concession, the NP agreed that the constitution would be drafted by a democratically elected body, though one bound by pre-determined constitutional principles. The ANC agreed in broad terms to a transitional arrangement, a Government of National Unity (GNU), and, by thus conceding to a two-stage transition, agreed to postpone the full transition to pure majority rule.

Comrades, we look at a GNU as a trap for us, but what if we see it as an opportunity?... If we have de Klerk and the others in government, we can control them more easily than if they are outside creating mayhem.

— ANC negotiator Albie Sachs, an early adopter of Joe Slovo's sunset clause proposal

This concession on the ANC's part was in keeping with an evolving internal debate, much of which revolved around a paper published during the same period in the African Communist by Joe Slovo, an influential SACP leader and negotiator. Slovo, urging the ANC-SACP alliance to take a long-term view on the transition, proposed making strategic concessions to the NP's demands, including the incorporation of a "sunset clause" which would allow a transitional period of temporary power-sharing to appease white politicians, bureaucrats, and military men. In February 1993, the National Executive Committee of the ANC formally endorsed the sunset clause proposal and the idea of a five-year coalition GNU, a decision which was to lubricate multi-party negotiations when they resumed later that year.

== Multi-Party Negotiating Forum (MPNF) ==
In early March 1993, an official Multi-Party Planning Conference was held at the World Trade Centre near Johannesburg to arrange the resumption of multi-party negotiations. The conference established the Multi-Party Negotiating Forum (MPNF), which met for the first time on 1 April 1993. Over the remainder of the year, the parties to the MPNF devised and agreed to an interim Constitution, which included a list of 34 "constitutional principles" by which the envisaged constituent assembly would be bound in drafting the final constitution.

=== Composition ===
The MPNF comprised 26 political groups, among them – in contrast to CODESA – the PAC, the Afrikaner Volksunie, and delegations representing various traditional leaders. It was managed by a planning committee comprising representatives from twelve of the parties, who were appointed in their personal capacity and worked full-time. Among them were Slovo of the SACP, Ramaphosa of the ANC, Meyer of the NP, Colin Eglin of the Democratic Party, Benny Alexander of the PAC, Pravin Gordhan of the Transvaal Indian Congress, Frank Mdlalose of the IFP, and Rowan Cronjé of Bophuthatswana.

Each party sent ten delegates to the plenary, which, as in CODESA, was required to ratify all formal agreements. Before they reached the plenary, proposals were discussed in the intermediate Negotiating Forum, which contained two delegates and two advisers from each party. However, the bulk of the MPNF's work was done in its Negotiating Council, which contained two delegates and two advisers from each party, and which was almost continuously in session between April and November. It was in the council that proposals were developed and compromises thrashed out before being sent for formal approval in the higher tiers of the body. The issues before the Negotiating Council were almost identical to those discussed at CODESA and the MPNF built on the latter's work. However, in a new innovation, the Negotiating Council at the end of April resolved to appoint seven technical committees, staffed mostly by lawyers and other experts, to assist in formulating detailed proposals on specific matters. As a result of agreements reached earlier by the Gender Advisory Committee of CODESA, at least one party delegate at each level of the MPNF had to be a woman.

In principle, the parties to the forum participated on an equal basis, irrespective of the size of their support base, with decisions taken by consensus. In practice, however, the ANC and NP developed a doctrine known as "sufficient consensus", which usually deemed bilateral ANC–NP agreement (sometimes reached in external or informal forums) "sufficient", regardless of any protests from minority parties. As a result, the MPNF was still more dominated by the interests of the ANC and NP than CODESA had been.

=== Assassination of Chris Hani: April 1993 ===
On 10 April 1993, a white extremist assassinated senior SACP and ANC leader Chris Hani outside Hani's home in Boksburg, Gauteng. Hani was extremely popular with the militant urban youth, a constituency whose commitment to a peaceful settlement was already tenuous, and his murder was potentially incendiary. However, Mandela's plea for calm, broadcast on national television, is viewed as having increased the status and credibility of the ANC, both internationally and among domestic moderates. Thus, somewhat paradoxically, the incident helped accelerate consensus between the ANC and the government, and on 3 June the parties announced a date for democratic elections, to be held in April the next year.

=== Storming of the World Trade Centre: June 1993 ===
On 25 June 1993, MPNF negotiations were dramatically interrupted when their venue was stormed by the right-wing Afrikaner Weerstandsbeweging (AWB), whose supporters crashed through the glass front of the building in an armoured car and briefly took over the negotiations chamber. Both Mandela and de Klerk condemned the attack, and all but two of the 26 negotiating parties publicly rejected the secessionist overtones of the AWB's protest.

=== Concerned South Africans Group ===
In early October 1992, the IFP initiated the formation of the Concerned South Africans Group (COSAG), an "unlikely alliance" between the IFP and other black traditionalists – Lucas Mangope of Bophuthatswana and Oupa Gqozo of Ciskei – and the white Conservative Party. Buthelezi himself later called it "a motley gathering". Buthelezi had been infuriated by the IFP's exclusion from the Record of Understanding, and in October 1992 had announced to a rally that the IFP would withdraw from further negotiations. Although he walked back this threat and the IFP ultimately joined the MPNF, COSAG was formed to ensure that its members were not sidelined or played off against each other, as they believed they had been in the past. Moreover, its members were in broad agreement in favour of federalism and political self-determination, principles that even the NP increasingly appeared to have abandoned, and they sought to present a united front in advocating for those principles.

Notwithstanding COSAG's efforts, Buthelezi felt that the negotiations had become two-sided and that the IFP – and he personally – were being marginalised by the principle of sufficient consensus. In June 1993, the IFP walked out of the MPNF, announcing its withdrawal from negotiations. What immediately precipitated the walk-out was an objection to the ANC–NP consensus on the date of the 1994 election. The Ciskei and Bophuthatswana governments continued to participate in the forum until October 1993, when they also withdrew. At that time, COSAG was reconstituted as the Freedom Alliance, also incorporating far-right white groups of the Afrikaner Volksfront. None of the Alliance's members participated in the remaining negotiations or ratified the proposals that emerged from them, but informal negotiations with the ANC and government continued on the sidelines of the MPNF.

=== Interim Constitution: November 1993 ===
The final plenary of the MPNF was convened on 17–18 November 1993. It ratified the interim Constitution in the early hours of the morning of 18 November 1993, after a flurry of bilateral agreements on sensitive issues were concluded in quick succession on 17 November. The MPNF's proposals and proposed electoral laws were adopted by the Tricameral Parliament, a concession to the NP's demand for legal continuity. Thereafter, South Africa's transition to democracy was overseen by the multi-party Transitional Executive Council. On the day of the council's inauguration in late 1993, Mandela and de Klerk were travelling to Oslo, where they were jointly awarded the Nobel Peace Prize for their efforts to end apartheid.

== Political transition ==
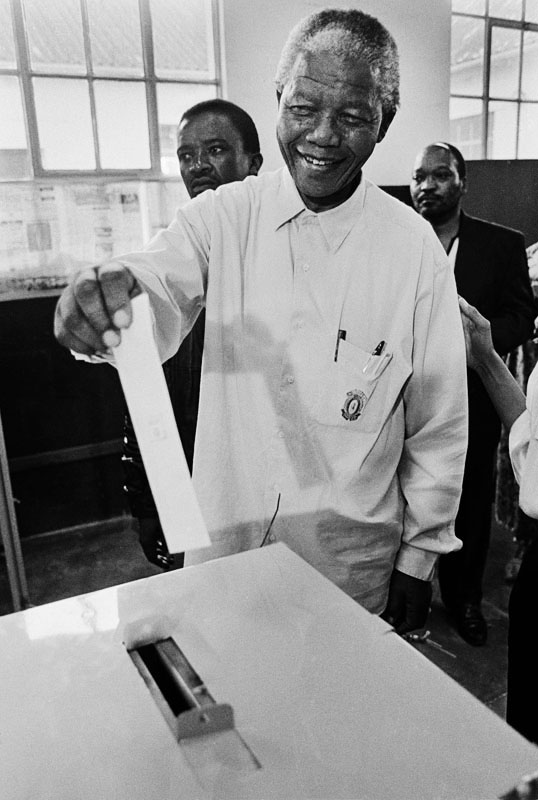
Mandela casting his vote on 27 April 1994.

=== Democratic elections: April 1994 ===
In the run-up to the 1994 elections, a final stumbling block was the continued boycott of the elections by the members of the Freedom Alliance. Shortly before the election, an international delegation, led by former U.S. Secretary of State Henry Kissinger and former British Foreign Secretary Peter Carington, visited South Africa to broker a resolution to the IFP's election boycott, or, failing that, to persuade the ANC and NP to delay the elections to avert possible violence. The talks fell apart without a resolution, and the prospect of civil war seemed imminent. Buthelezi's IFP was convinced to participate in the elections by a secret deal negotiated with the NP in which all of the land of KwaZulu was transferred into a trust with the Zulu King as sole trustee. The IFP's name was added to the ballot papers, which had already been printed, by means of a sticker added manually to the bottom of each slip. Opposition from other wings of the former COSAG was also neutralised: in March, days after Mangope announced that his "country" would not participate in the elections, his administration was effectively paralysed by the Bophutatswana crisis. In the aftermath of the crisis, which was considered humiliating by some far-right leaders, the Freedom Front split from the Afrikaner Volksfront and confirmed its intention to contest the elections, ensuring that far-right Afrikaners would be represented in the new government.

On 27 April 1994, a date later celebrated as Freedom Day, South Africa held its first elections under universal suffrage. The ANC won a resounding majority in the election and Mandela was elected president. Six other parties were represented in the national legislature and among them, under the provisions of the interim Constitution, the NP and IFP won enough seats to participate alongside the ANC in a single-term coalition Government of National Unity. Also in terms of a constitutional provision, de Klerk was appointed Mandela's second deputy president.

=== Aftermath ===
In 1995, government passed legislation mandating the creation of the Truth and Reconciliation Commission, a restorative justice tribunal which over the next three years investigated human rights violations under apartheid. The final Constitution was negotiated by the Constitutional Assembly, working from principles contained in the interim Constitution, and was provisionally adopted on 8 May 1996. The next day, de Klerk announced that the NP would withdraw from the Government of National Unity, calling the moment a "natural watershed". Following changes made to the text at the instruction of the new Constitutional Court, the final Constitution came into effect in February 1997 and successful elections were held under its provisions in June 1999, consolidating the ANC's long-lived majority in the national legislature.

== See also ==
- African nationalism
- Afrikaner nationalism
- One settler, one bullet
- Battle of Ventersdorp
- Saint James Church massacre
- Heidelberg Tavern massacre
- Shell House massacre
- History of the African National Congress
- History of South Africa
- Politics of South Africa
- Government of South Africa
- Chapter Two of the Constitution of South Africa
- Presidency of Nelson Mandela
- Reconstruction and Development Programme
