= Ventersdorp =

Town in the North West province of South Africa

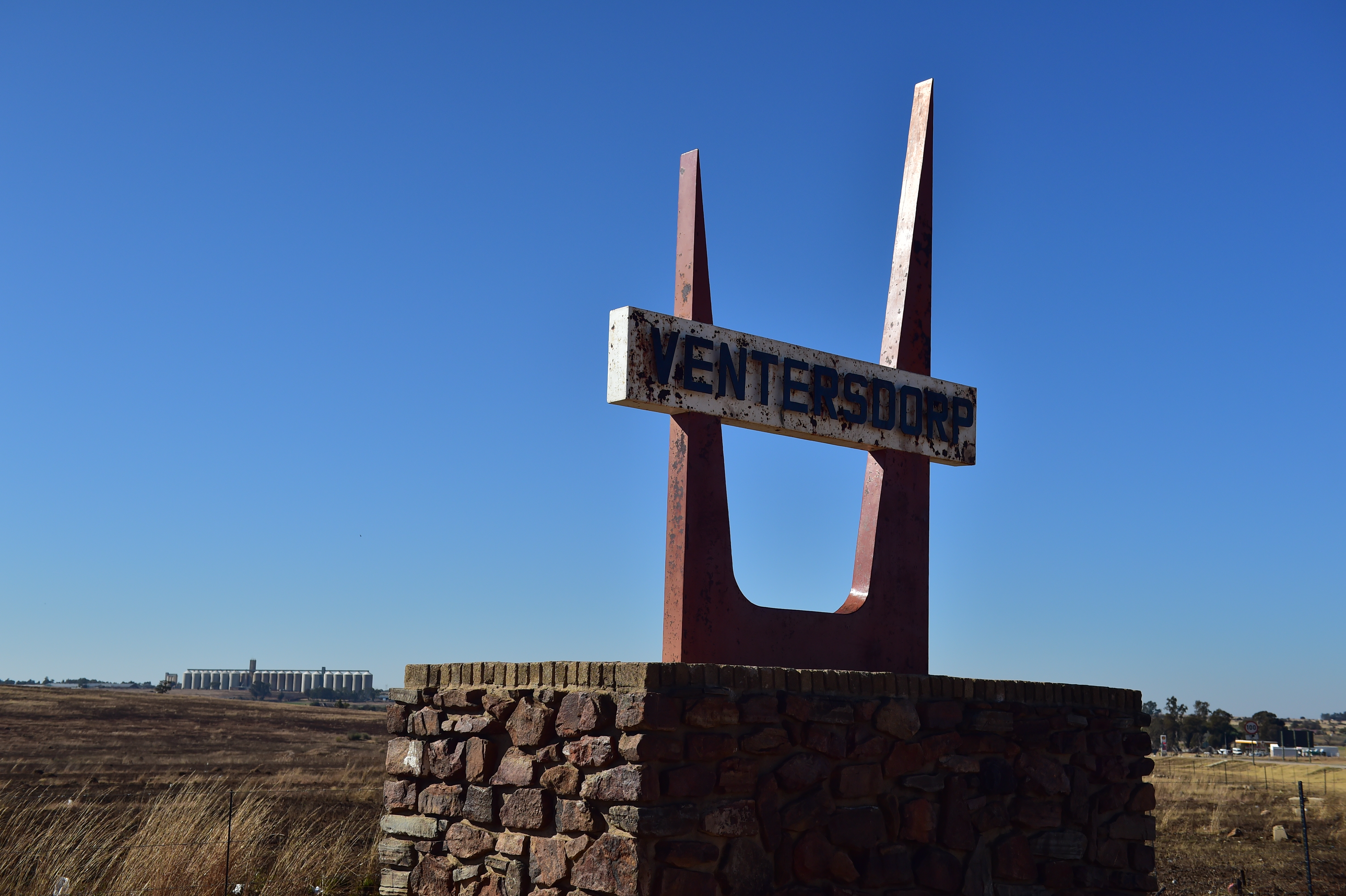

- Location within North West (South African province) Location within South Africa Location within Africa
- Coordinates: 26°19′S 26°49′E
- Country: South Africa
- Province: North West
- District: Dr Kenneth Kaunda
- Municipality: JB Marks
- Established: 1866

Area
  - Total: 53.88 km^{2} (20.80 sq mi)

Population (2011)
  - Total: 4,204
  - Density: 78.03/km^{2} (202.1/sq mi)

Racial makeup (2011)
  - Black African: 51.4%
  - Coloured: 5.5%
  - Indian/Asian: 2.3%
  - White: 40.2%
  - Other: 0.5%

First languages (2011)
  - Afrikaans: 46.6%
  - Tswana: 40.5%
  - English: 4.3%
  - Xhosa: 2.8%
  - Other: 5.8%
- Time zone: UTC+2 (SAST)
- Postal code (street): 2710
- PO box: 2710
- Area code: 018

Ventersdorp is a town of about 4,200 people in Dr Kenneth Kaunda District Municipality, North West Province, South Africa. It was the seat of the defunct Ventersdorp Local Municipality until 2016.

Ventersdorp is centrally located, making it easier to access more prominent urban towns such as Klerksdorp, Lichtenburg, Potchefstroom and Rustenburg. The township (or Location) of Tshing houses most of the town's blacks and coloureds. Tshing has a diamond mine nearby that was owned by a town councillor in the early 1990s. Tshing Location has one high school: Thuto Boswa High School. The smaller township Toevlug has Coloured residents, some of whom have attend the former whites-only Afrikaans High School after the end of Apartheid since 1995.

== History ==
The town grew around a Dutch Reformed Church that was established in 1866. It was named after Johannes Venter who owned the farm Roodepoort and the land the church was built on. It was proclaimed as a town in June 1887. The Mill on the town was built by Richrd Carew Wilson in 1866

== Racial tensions ==
Afrikaner nationalist and white supremacist Eugène Terre'Blanche was born in Ventersdorp and the town is the base of the Afrikaner Weerstandsbeweging (AWB), the far-right white separatist political organisation and former paramilitary group that Terre'Blanche founded. The town was the site of the 1991 "Battle of Ventersdorp" in which lethal clashes occurred between members of the apartheid government security forces and the AWB ahead of a scheduled appearance by then State President F. W. de Klerk.

== See also ==
- Battle of Ventersdorp

== External sources ==
- The Leader, His Driver and the Driver's Wife, a Nick Broomfield film (1991)
- His Big White Self, a Nick Broomfield film (2006)
