= Rooigrond =

- Location within North West (South African province) Location within South Africa
- Coordinates: 25.922°S 25.802°E
- Country: South Africa
- Province: North West
- District: Ngaka Modiri Molema
- Municipality: Mafikeng

Area
  - Total: 3.47 km^{2} (1.34 sq mi)

Population (2011)
  - Total: 2,810
  - Density: 810/km^{2} (2,100/sq mi)

Racial makeup (2011)
  - Black African: 88.6%
  - Coloured: 1.1%
  - Indian/Asian: 0.4%
  - White: 9.8%
  - Other: 0.1%

First languages (2011)
  - Tswana: 78.3%
  - Afrikaans: 10.9%
  - English: 2.5%
  - S. Ndebele: 2.2%
  - Other: 6.1%
- Time zone: UTC+2 (SAST)
- PO box: 2743
- Area code: 018

Rooigrond is a town in Ngaka Modiri Molema District Municipality in the North West province of South Africa.

Hamlet 16 km south-east of Mafikeng and 25 km south-west of Ottoshoop. Afrikaans for ‘red ground’. The place was formerly known as Vrywilligersrus and Heliopolis. Part of the region Rooigrond, ceded to Boer volunteers under Adriaan de la Rey by Tswana chiefs in the 1880s, became the republics of Stellaland and Goshen. Rooigrond served as capital of the State of Goshen from 1882 to 1883.
