= Afrikaner Calvinism =

Reformed Protestant tradition among Afrikaners

Afrikaner Calvinism is the Reformed Protestant tradition of the Afrikaners. It rests on the confessional standards of the Dutch Reformed tradition, the Three Forms of Unity (the Belgic Confession, the Heidelberg Catechism and the Canons of Dort), and is carried mainly by three Afrikaans Reformed churches: the Dutch Reformed Church (NGK), the Nederduitsch Hervormde Kerk van Afrika (NHK) and the Reformed Churches in South Africa (GKSA).

The tradition began in the Dutch Reformed public church that the Dutch East India Company established at the Cape after 1652. The church was supervised by the classis of Amsterdam and served by ministers trained in the Netherlands, and over time it absorbed Lutheran settlers as well as French Huguenot refugees. Under British rule in the 19th century, Scottish ministers and the revivals associated with Andrew Murray gave the Cape church a strongly evangelical character. Settlers in the interior formed the NHK and, in 1859, the stricter Gereformeerde Kerk, whose members are known as "Doppers". From the 1880s S. J. du Toit introduced the neo-Calvinism of Abraham Kuyper, and after 1902 a Kuyperian Christian-National movement centred on Potchefstroom became influential in Afrikaner nationalism. In the 20th century the Afrikaans Reformed churches developed theological justifications for apartheid. The same tradition also produced internal critics of apartheid and, within the Dutch Reformed Mission Church, the Belhar Confession (1986). From the 1980s onwards the three churches formally moved away from apartheid: the NGK with Kerk en Samelewing in 1986, the GKSA in 1991 and the NHK in 2010.

== Terminology ==
The term Calvinism has been applied to Afrikaner religion in several senses, and historians have criticised its loose use. Much of the older literature used the word with little definite doctrinal content and rarely engaged with Calvin's Institutes, the Canons of Dort or later Reformed theologians. Although the Dutch Reformed Church was formally bound to Calvinist confessional standards, the theology of most of its 19th-century ministers was evangelical rather than strictly Calvinist. The earliest group at the Cape known to have called itself Calvinist was a "Calvinist Society" formed in Cape Town in the first years of the 19th century, for whose members the word meant a belief in predestination.

In its narrowest sense, the term refers to the confessional Reformed tradition of the Afrikaans churches, defined by the Three Forms of Unity. The English name "Dutch Reformed" is often used loosely for all three of these churches, the Nederduitse Gereformeerde Kerk, the Nederduitsch Hervormde Kerk and the Gereformeerde Kerke. As a result, the views of the small Gereformeerde Kerk have sometimes been attributed to the much larger NGK.

A second sense is the neo-Calvinism of Kuyper and his Afrikaner followers, centred on Potchefstroom from the early 20th century. Its social and political programme was called Christian-National (Christelik-Nasionaal), a term taken from the Dutch Anti-Revolutionary movement of Guillaume Groen van Prinsterer.

A third sense is what the sociologist T. Dunbar Moodie called the Afrikaner civil religion, a term he took from Robert Bellah and defined as the religious dimension of the state. In his account it was a sacred reading of Afrikaner history from the British occupation of the Cape to 1914, with rituals centred on the commemoration of the Battle of Blood River on 16 December. Moodie argued that although its idea of God came from Calvin and the Old Testament, it treated the nation rather than the church as the elect. He described it as a Christian heresy that nonetheless lived alongside the orthodox Reformed churches. The theologian John de Gruchy described the "Afrikaner Calvinism" that emerged in the 20th century as an uneasy mixture of 19th-century evangelical piety and an adapted Kuyperian neo-Calvinism.

== Doctrine and church life ==
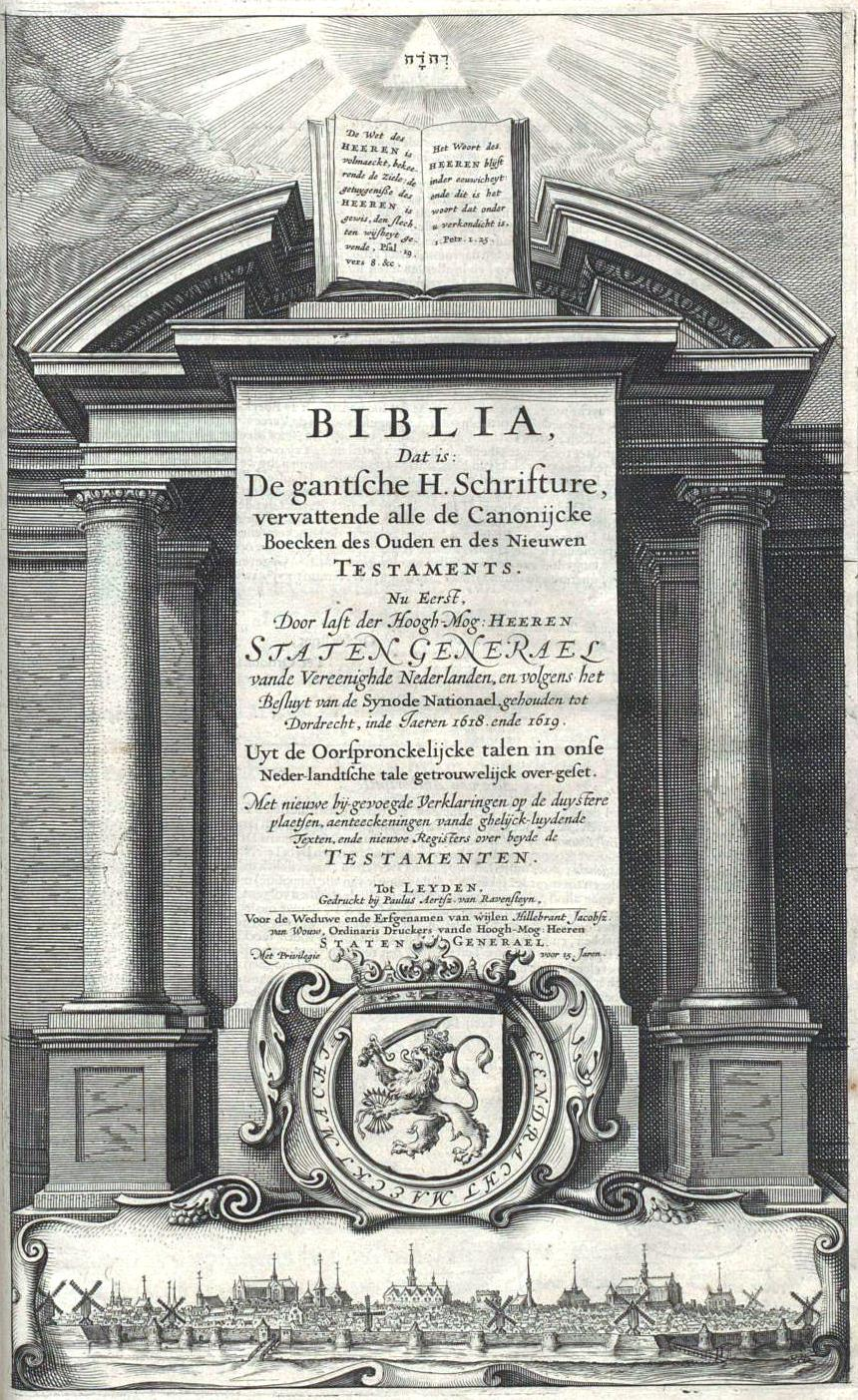
Title page of the Dutch States Bible, the Bible used in household worship at the Cape

Ministers sent to the Cape by the classis of Amsterdam had to sign the Belgic Confession, the Heidelberg Catechism and the Canons of Dort before they were ordained. Lay sick-visitors (ziekentroosters) and schoolteachers had to sign them too. The Belgic Confession and the Heidelberg Catechism were printed at the back of the family Bible, and anyone who wanted to become a communicant member had to know the Catechism or its shorter Compendium. Ministers preached regularly through the Catechism, at first weekly and later monthly. Ordinary church members, by contrast, rarely came across the Canons of Dort directly.

As in the Netherlands, the church baptised widely but admitted members strictly. Baptism did not in itself make a person a member. Only those who had made a public profession of faith were communicant members, while baptised non-communicants and regular hearers stayed outside formal membership. Infant baptism was understood within covenant theology, which held that God's covenant extended to a thousand generations of believers' descendants. The baptismal form adopted by the Synod of Dort was read at the Cape without alteration. Frontier families travelled for up to three weeks to attend church between one and three times a year, and the best-attended services were those at which the Lord's Supper (Nagmaal) was celebrated.

The Dutch States Bible, commissioned by the Synod of Dort, was the centre of household religion. It was used in daily family worship (boekevat), and many colonists treated its marginal notes and appendices as almost as authoritative as the text itself. The clergy and the devotional books in circulation, such as the works of Wilhelmus à Brakel and Bernardus Hellenbroek, leaned towards the strict piety associated with Gisbertus Voetius. Its influence can be seen in colonial laws against breaking the Sabbath. By the late 18th century, ministers influenced by the Nadere Reformatie, such as M. C. Vos, were calling baptised members to personal conversion and had begun ministering to slaves.

Disputes over worship and doctrine shaped the divisions between the three churches. The Doppers, a distinct group in the north-eastern Cape since the 18th century, objected to the singing of hymns in church, and this objection led to the founding of the separate Gereformeerde Kerk in 1859. In the NGK, Andrew Murray's revivalist preaching stressed human responsibility and a universal call to faith. In 1871 J. J. Kotzé accused him of departing from the Canons of Dort on predestination and on the extent of Christ's death, but the charge was not upheld. From the early 20th century the Gereformeerde Kerk and parts of the NGK also took up Kuyper's neo-Calvinist teachings, including sphere sovereignty and common grace.

== History ==
The history of Afrikaner Calvinism is closely tied to the history of the Dutch Reformed churches in South Africa as institutions, and to the outside influences that shaped them one after another. For about a century and a half the Cape church was a branch of the Reformed Church of the Netherlands, governed from Amsterdam and served by Dutch-trained ministers. Under British rule it came under the influence of Scottish evangelicalism. In the interior, the churches founded after the Great Trek were shaped by Dutch clergy, by the Dutch Secession of 1834, and later by Kuyper's neo-Calvinism. From the late 19th century the tradition became closely linked with Afrikaner nationalism, and from the 1930s with the theological debates over segregation and apartheid. Throughout this history the Afrikaans Reformed churches remained divided among themselves over worship, doctrine and their relationship to politics.

=== Dutch East India Company period (1652–1795) ===
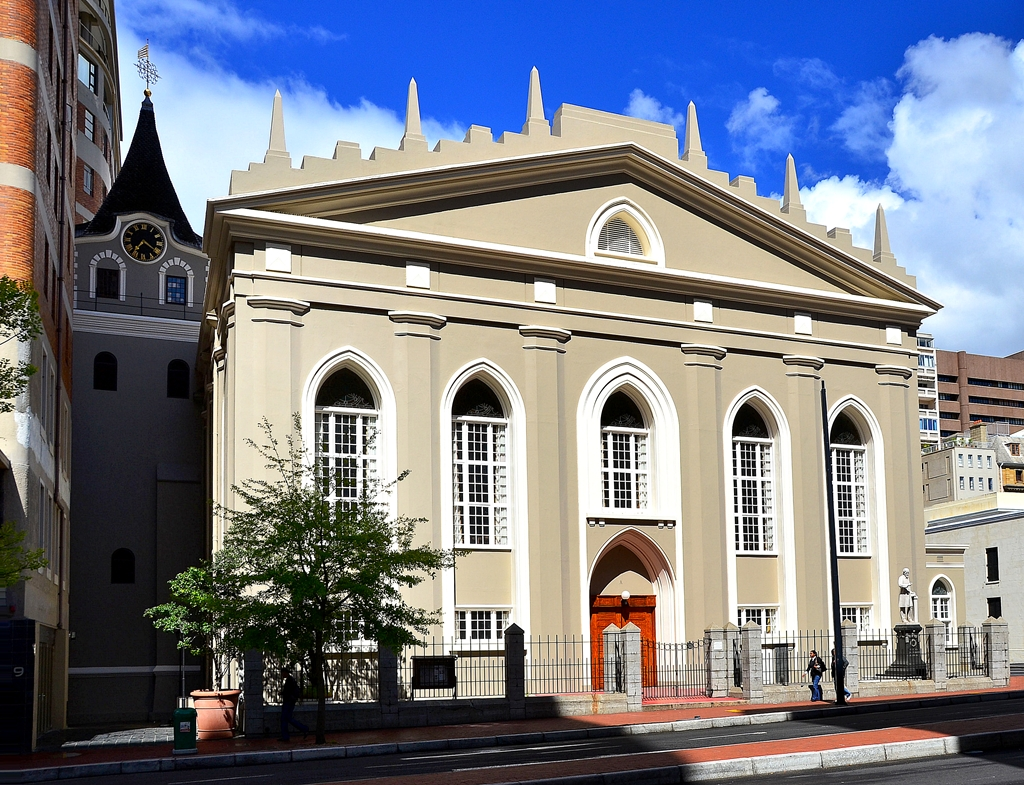
The Groote Kerk in Cape Town, the mother congregation of the Dutch Reformed Church in South Africa

The Dutch East India Company (VOC) founded a refreshment station at the Cape in 1652, and the Reformed church became the colony's public church. A resident minister, Johan van Arkel, arrived only in 1665. Until then, ministers from passing ships baptised, married and served communion. The congregations of Cape Town, Stellenbosch and Drakenstein answered to the classis of Amsterdam. Every minister had studied in the Netherlands and was bound by the classis's rules of administration, and the Cape Town church council was still reporting to Amsterdam every year in the late 18th century. The deacons ran the colony's only public poor relief, which helped free burghers and free blacks whether or not they belonged to the church.

Formal membership was small. Around 1700 Cape Town had about 100 communicant members, Stellenbosch about 50 and Drakenstein about 100, or roughly 8, 25 and 50 per cent of adult Europeans. Drakenstein's high figure reflected its French Huguenot settlers. In all three congregations, women outnumbered men. The company required colonists to be Protestant, but Lutherans could not worship publicly until 1780. By then most German and Scandinavian Lutherans had joined the Reformed church, and only 442 enrolled when a Lutheran congregation finally opened in Cape Town. Membership grew sharply in the later 18th century. Stellenbosch went from about 50 members to 267 by 1786, more than half its adult free burghers, and professions of faith tripled after 1769. On the frontier, where churches were far apart and pulpits often stood empty for years, colonists often treated ministers with open contempt. They still saw themselves as Reformed, and often as more orthodox than their clergy.

The Cape congregations did little mission work. Early hopes of converting the Khoikhoi faded fast, and the clergy made almost no effort to learn their language. What effort there was went mainly to imported slaves. A school founded soon after 1652 also took slave pupils, and a permanent school for slaves opened in 1685. The Synod of Dort had ruled in 1618 that children of two non-Christian parents should not be baptised until they could profess the faith themselves, on the grounds that they stood outside the covenant. The Cape soon broke with this. Following the practice of Batavia, it baptised slave children whose owners promised them a Christian upbringing, and when a visiting minister refused in 1666 to baptise slave children with no European parent, the governor overruled him. An instruction from Amsterdam in 1679 to follow Dort briefly halted slave baptism until the commissioner H. A. van Reede restored it in 1685.

In practice there were two baptismal regimes. The company had all its own slave children baptised, and more than 1,700 were baptised in Cape Town before 1796. Free burghers baptised their own children but very rarely their slaves, and the registers of the country congregations record almost no slave baptisms at all. Estimates of the number of privately owned slaves baptised therefore vary considerably between historians. Church registers do list slaves, free blacks, Khoikhoi and people of mixed descent among the members, and the number of members of colour in Cape Town rose markedly between 1780 and 1800. The clergy guarded their control of the sacraments closely, though. When the Moravian missionary Georg Schmidt baptised Khoikhoi converts without Reformed ordination, they pressed for his removal. By the end of the century, evangelical ministers such as Vos were pressing for mission among slaves, against resistance from some colonists.

In everyday colonial speech, "Christian" and "heathen" described a person's place in society as much as their faith. Frontier colonists commonly called themselves "Christians" rather than whites or Dutchmen. When frontier farmers came close to rebellion in 1739, one of their grievances was a belief that the company took the word of unbaptised Khoikhoi over their own. In the 1780s a group of burghers refused to obey a militia corporal because he was of "heathen" descent. Yet descent alone did not decide where someone stood. Krotoa, a Khoikhoi woman who lived at the early settlement, was baptised as Eva, and Governor Simon van der Stel was himself the grandson of a slave.

Baptism did not bring freedom. Van Reede laid down in 1685 that no Christian should remain a slave for life, but the rule was never made compulsory and was little applied. Only 893 slaves were freed between 1715 and 1792, and in practice baptism, a command of Dutch and a guarantor were required. From 1770 baptised slaves could no longer be sold. Many owners therefore refused to have their slaves baptised to protect their investment, and some preferred their slaves to become Muslim, so that Islam spread among the slaves of Cape Town.

Some colonists bent the Scriptures to suit themselves. Vos once met a farmer who took Psalm 2:8 ("I shall give thee the heathen for thine inheritance") as permission to treat his slaves however he liked, though the man gave way once Vos explained the usual reading. The curse of Ham, often linked to Afrikaner racial thinking, appears only occasionally in the record. Stellenbosch burghers dismissed free blacks as being of "the blood of Ham" in 1707. The Drakenstein church council mentioned Ham in a letter of 1703 while urging the conversion of the Khoikhoi, and historians disagree over whether it rejected the idea or took it for granted. Explicit use of the curse to justify oppression is rarer still, and the clearest early case dates from 1803. Nor did the clergy think of the Cape as a particularly devout place. The minister E. F. le Boucq in 1708, and the Drakenstein church council in 1713, both complained that colonists were drifting away from church life and into the ways of the Khoikhoi around them.

=== British rule and the evangelical era (1795–1880) ===
Andrew Murray Sr, one of the Scottish ministers who served the Cape church from the 1820s and the father of John and Andrew Murray

Britain took the Cape in 1795 and, after a brief return to Dutch rule, kept it from 1806. The church survived the change of flag largely intact, but its character changed. From the 1820s the colonial government recruited Scottish Presbyterian ministers to fill Dutch Reformed pulpits, and they soon dominated the Cape synod, bringing an evangelical piety with them. The Murray family came to stand for this tradition. John Murray was one of the two founding professors of the theological seminary at Stellenbosch, opened in 1859, which went on to train almost every NGK minister. His brother Andrew Murray Jr led the Cape synods from the 1860s to the end of the century, and the revival of the early 1860s spread his influence to congregations across the colony. Liberal theology had its supporters too. J. J. Kotzé and T. F. Burgers, later president of the Transvaal, were both suspended by the church in 1863–64 and then reinstated by the civil courts. Within a few years, though, the evangelicals had won control of the NGK.

British rule also changed the position of slaves in the church. After Governor Somerset exempted owners from tax on baptised slaves in 1822, slave baptisms rose so quickly that by 1827 most frontier congregations had more slave members than free ones. These decades also settled how the church would handle race at the communion table. After a missionary society was founded in 1799, converts often met for instruction in separate buildings while remaining members of the same congregation. In 1825 the Stellenbosch church council introduced separate communion for members of colour, while admitting in the same resolution that God shows no partiality between people. The synod of 1829 went the other way and declared that communion should be served to all members together, as a principle grounded in Scripture. By the 1850s, however, separate services had become common practice. In 1857 the synod, on a motion by Andrew Murray Sr, accepted the situation. It still called a single congregation the better and more scriptural course, but allowed separate worship facilities "due to the weakness of some". The decision reflected evangelical rather than strictly Calvinist influence, but it later came to be seen as the step that opened the way to a theological justification of segregated churches. In 1881 a separate Dutch Reformed Mission Church was formed for coloured members. The initiative came from missionaries and mission congregations, with the synod providing the legal basis in 1880.

Further north, the Great Trek took thousands of colonists beyond the reach of the Cape church in the late 1830s. The public statements of the Trek leaders used broad language about divine providence rather than any specifically Calvinist doctrine. Before the Battle of Blood River in December 1838, the Voortrekkers, led by Sarel Cilliers, made a vow to keep the day holy if God gave them victory. Public commemoration soon lapsed and was revived only in 1880, so the vow's central place in Afrikaner religious nationalism came much later. In the Transvaal, the settlers distrusted a Cape church that answered to a synod under British authority, so they founded their own church, the Nederduitsch Hervormde Kerk, under the Leiden-trained minister Dirk van der Hoff. The conflicts that followed were mostly about church government and ties to the state rather than doctrine. They were bitter all the same, and each of the rival churches claimed to be the true heir of Dutch Reformed orthodoxy.

The sharpest of these splits came from the Doppers, a conservative community whose families were mostly of German rather than Dutch descent, and few of whom had joined the Trek. In 1857 a Free State politician wrote to the Dutch Seceder church, which had broken away from the Dutch state church in 1834, asking for a minister. It sent Dirk Postma, who arrived in 1858. In January 1859 the Hervormde synod in the Transvaal made the singing of evangelical hymns, which the Doppers regarded as doctrinally impure, compulsory in all its congregations. On 11 February 1859 Paul Kruger and like-minded members of the Rustenburg congregation seceded and invited Postma to be their minister, founding the Gereformeerde Kerk. The new church grew quickly, from 2,253 members in its first year to 4,362 by 1868. It opened a theological school at Burgersdorp in 1869 and looked to the Netherlands rather than Scotland for its theology. Relations with the NGK's evangelical leaders were cool. Andrew Murray regretted that his circle could never reach "the real stiff dopper mind".

=== Neo-Calvinism and early nationalism (1880–1902) ===
S. J. du Toit as a member of the Transvaal deputation to London in 1883–84

By the 1870s the isolation of the interior was breaking down. Roads, schools, newspapers and finally railways reached rural communities, and by the 1890s farming families lived in a very different world from that of the Trek generation. A distinct Afrikaner national feeling stirred in the same years. It began with a movement to write and publish in Afrikaans from 1875, and grew sharply during the Transvaal's war of independence against Britain in 1880–81. On 16 December 1880, the anniversary of Blood River, thousands of Transvaal burghers gathered at Paardekraal to renew the 1838 vow, piling up a cairn of stones before taking up arms. From 1881 festivals were held there every five years.

The first person to try to give this nationalism a Calvinist programme was S. J. du Toit, an NGK minister at Paarl. He led the Afrikaans language movement, edited the newspaper Die Patriot, wrote the first nationalist history in Afrikaans in 1877, and founded the Afrikaner Bond in 1880. His political ideas came straight from Kuyper, whose Anti-Revolutionary Party had been founded in the Netherlands in 1879. In August 1882 Kruger issued a manifesto declaring that he confessed "the eternal principles of God's Word" in politics as well. Its wording, drafted by Du Toit, matched the third article of Kuyper's party programme. After 1881 Du Toit served as superintendent of education in the Transvaal, and in 1884 he published a commentary for the Bond adapted from Kuyper's own Ons Program.

Most Afrikaners wanted little to do with it. At the Bond's 1884 congress at Graaff-Reinet, speaker after speaker objected to bringing confessional principles into party politics, and the newspaper De Zuid-Afrikaan dismissed the programme as an import from "a certain political party in Holland". Most NGK ministers of the time were evangelicals with no taste for strict Calvinism, and they gave Du Toit little support. In 1889 the Bond adopted the practical and secular programme of Jan Hofmeyr instead. Du Toit fell from favour, ended up siding with Cecil Rhodes after the Jameson Raid, and in 1897 led a small breakaway from the NGK, which was later absorbed into the Gereformeerde Kerk.

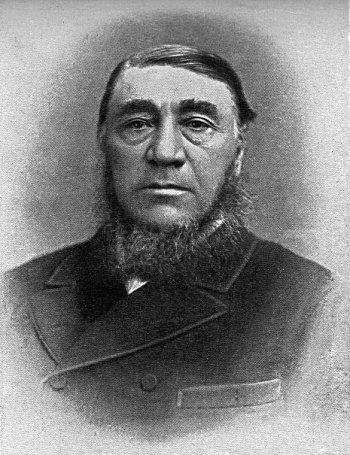
Paul Kruger, president of the South African Republic and a founding member of the Gereformeerde Kerk

Kruger, president of the South African Republic from 1883, was a founding member of the Gereformeerde Kerk and the most prominent Dopper of his day. He presented the Paardekraal gatherings as religious festivals. He saw the British annexation of 1877 as God's punishment for neglecting the Blood River vow, and the victory of 1881 as a sign that God had been reconciled with his people. His speeches called the Transvaal burghers "God's people". Du Toit stresses that he used the phrase broadly enough to include newcomers and foreigners, and spoke of the nation's "calling" rather than its election. Moodie reads Kruger's distinction between a personal inward call and the outward calling of the nation as an application of Calvin's teaching on the election of peoples, a reading Du Toit rejects for lack of evidence. Giliomee regards Kruger as more closely associated with the chosen-people idea than any other Afrikaner leader. In principle Kruger held to equality before the law and supported missions, but in practice he did not count black Africans as part of the Transvaal people.

The earliest Afrikaner writing to compare the Afrikaners directly with Israel dates from this period. S. J. du Toit's sermons of 1881 likened God's hand among the Transvaalers to his hand among the Israelites, and further examples followed in 1883 and 1885. Even then, De Zuid-Afrikaan replied that a Christian nation belonged to a wider community of nations, and that Du Toit's exclusivism went much too far. Kuyper's own writings contained no such ideology. He did admire the Boers. His 1900 pamphlet The South-African Crisis held Kruger up as a statesman of rare judgement, repeating Bismarck's reported remark that no statesman in Europe surpassed him in sagacity, and as Dutch prime minister Kuyper later defended his country's neutrality during the Anglo-Boer War. The same pamphlet, however, described black Africans in openly racial terms. During the war, religious language came to the fore among the Boer forces. At Nooitgedacht on 16 December 1900, for example, around 2,000 people publicly confessed the sin of neglecting the vow.

=== After the Anglo-Boer War (1902–1948) ===
The National Women's Monument in Bloemfontein, unveiled in 1913 in memory of the women and children who died in the camps. Totius wrote By die Monument (1908) to help raise money for it.

The war left deep scars. Estimates of the number of Boer women and children who died in British concentration camps range from about 18,000 to 28,000, and around 14,000 black Africans died in separate camps. Afterwards Lord Milner's administration set out to anglicise the former republics, bringing in more than 600 teachers from Britain and replacing local control of schools with a central system. The churches answered by founding their own Christian-National schools, which taught in Dutch and placed education under parents and congregations. The Doppers were the movement's most determined backers, and they kept it going after the Boer generals Louis Botha and Jan Smuts made peace with the government school system in 1907.

The small Gereformeerde Kerk had an influence well beyond its numbers in these years. Its theological school moved from Burgersdorp to Potchefstroom in 1905. Its best students went on to Kuyper's Free University in Amsterdam, and Jan Kamp, a former editor of Kuyper's newspaper, joined the staff. The poet J. D. du Toit, known as Totius, the son of S. J. du Toit, became a professor there in 1911. His poetry, beginning with By die Monument (1908), retold the Trek and the war as the story of a people tested and shaped by suffering under God's hand. His brother-in-law Willem Postma put the same ideas into prose, calling the Afrikaners a chosen people and the Trek a second Exodus. When the National Party was founded in 1914, its programme spoke of developing the nation along "Christian national lines" and of white rule "in a spirit of Christian trusteeship", although its leader J. B. M. Hertzog was an agnostic. Dopper districts were among its firmest supporters, and in 1914 Kamp was already speaking of the Doppers' "apartheid", meaning their practice of standing apart to live by Calvinist principles.

In the much larger NGK, younger ministers were among the leaders of the second Afrikaans language movement. In 1919 the church gave Afrikaans equal standing with Dutch, following an earlier decision to translate the Bible into Afrikaans. Many NGK ministers, among them D. F. Malan, William Nicol and J. D. Kestell, saw the church as a volkskerk (people's church) bound to the welfare of the Afrikaner people. Their reasons were mostly practical rather than theological, above all the poverty of the many Afrikaners who were drifting into the cities. By the early 1930s around 300,000 Afrikaners were living in poverty. In 1915 a conference of NGK ministers in Bloemfontein accepted Malan's proposal that the church should be national in character while keeping out of party politics. The old evangelical wing was uneasy. Andrew Murray told Malan that the church united believers even from nations that had hated one another.

Kuyper's ideas gained ground in the NGK from the 1920s, as more of its candidates studied in Amsterdam. The tension came to a head in the late 1920s, when the Stellenbosch professor Johannes du Plessis was tried for heresy and removed for accepting critical biblical scholarship. Totius was among the witnesses against him. In 1935 writers from all three churches published Koers in die Krisis, a collection of essays calling for a Calvinist renewal of Afrikaner life, while older evangelicals complained in the church press that the NGK was being made "narrowly Reformed". The Potchefstroom philosopher Hendrik Stoker extended Kuyper's idea of sphere sovereignty by treating the volk (nation) as a sphere of life with its own God-given calling, a step beyond Kuyper himself. A different strand of nationalism, drawn from German romantic thinkers and promoted by intellectuals such as Nico Diederichs and Geoff Cronjé, went further still and treated service to the nation as service to God. Stoker and L. J. du Plessis criticised this as making an idol of the nation.

The Afrikaner Broederbond, founded in Johannesburg in 1918 and open only to Afrikaans-speaking Protestant men, became the main meeting point for these movements. It soon became a secret society, and from the late 1920s its leadership was dominated by Potchefstroom academics such as J. C. van Rooy. By the 1940s its members held senior posts in the synods of both the NGK and the Gereformeerde Kerk. Moodie describes the Christian-National ideology it promoted as a Kuyperian version of the civil religion, while Giliomee argues that the Broederbond's influence has been greatly overstated. The Day of the Vow, little observed between 1910 and 1928, drew huge crowds during the centenary of the Great Trek in 1938. Ox-wagons travelled across the country to Pretoria, and in each town on the route the local Dutch Reformed minister organised their reception. Children were baptised beside the wagons, and on 16 December 1938 more than 100,000 people gathered for the laying of the foundation stone of the Voortrekker Monument. Hertzog stayed away, warning against dragging holy things into politics.

The NGK's mission policy moved in the same direction as the nationalist movement. The first recorded use of the word apartheid in its later sense came from the NGK minister J. C. du Plessis at a missions conference in Kroonstad in 1929. The missions secretary J. G. Strydom (no relation of the later prime minister) was already describing apartheid as the church's mission policy, and the federal mission policy adopted by all the NGK's synods in 1935 held that making Africans Christian did not mean making them less African, and ruled out social equality between the races. NGK ministers and mission strategists were thus the first to formulate an ideology of apartheid. F. G. Badenhorst defended racial separation in a doctoral thesis in Amsterdam in 1939, and in 1943 a delegation from the church's mission council asked Smuts to ban mixed marriages, which he refused to do. Malan himself acknowledged in 1947 that the church, not the state, had taken the lead with apartheid. At the Volkskongres of 1944 Totius gave what was probably the first published theological defence of apartheid. He argued from the Tower of Babel, from God's creation and providence, and from Acts 17:26 that God had ordained separate nations and that integration was sinful. Not all Potchefstroom Calvinists supported the government of the day. During the Second World War, Potchefstroom University students were attacked by government soldiers, and Stoker was interned at Koffiefontein. Van Wyk describes Stoker as a critic of National Socialism, but Giliomee places him among the Afrikaner intellectuals whose writing came close to Nazi thinking.

=== Apartheid era (1948–1994) ===
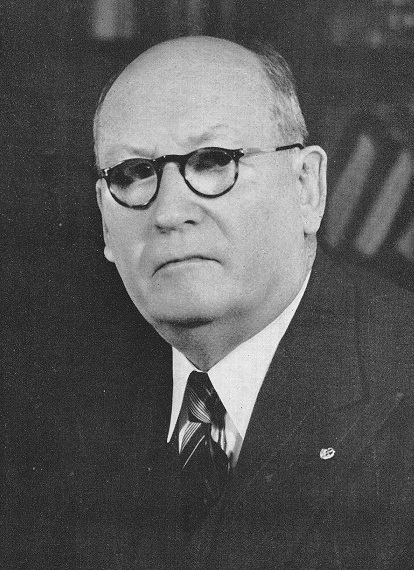
D. F. Malan, a former NGK minister, led the National Party to power in 1948

The National Party came to power in 1948 under Malan, a former NGK minister. Its campaign rested on issues on which the churches and the Broederbond agreed, among them apartheid, and its victory owed much to the civil religion. The church synods now gave the policy their formal backing. The Transvaal synod of 1948 appealed to the Tower of Babel and the history of Israel, and the Cape synod of 1949 to Acts 17:26, which became the mainstay of apartheid's defenders. The churches sometimes went further than the government. When they called for total territorial separation in 1950, Malan told them it was not National Party policy. The NHK followed the NGK in defending apartheid, and the Gereformeerde Kerk did so too, though with more reservation. In the NGK, apartheid's leading defenders included A. B. du Preez, Andries Treurnicht, J. D. Vorster and above all F. J. M. Potgieter, professor at Stellenbosch from 1946 to 1977 and the most influential of its neo-Calvinist apologists. In the NHK they included A. D. Pont, and in the Gereformeerde Kerk, Totius and Stoker. Their arguments followed a familiar pattern. God had created human diversity. The scattering of the nations at Babel was God's own safeguard against their mixing, and Pentecost confirmed separate peoples rather than abolishing them. Acts 17:26, which speaks of God appointing the bounds of the nations' habitation, became the central proof text. Unity in Christ was taken to be spiritual rather than visible, and the more developed peoples were held to have a duty of guardianship over the less developed. The NGK included about 40 per cent of whites and 70 per cent of Afrikaners, among them most cabinet ministers, and critics called it "the National Party in prayer". By 1978 nearly 40 per cent of its white ministers belonged to the Broederbond.

Church structures followed the same lines. The NGK had already set up separate churches for its coloured, black and Indian members, the last of them in 1968. The NHK's church order of 1951 limited membership to white people and ruled out any equality between the races, and in 1960 its general assembly declared separate development the only just policy grounded in Christian principle. The Gereformeerde Kerk organised its congregations into separate national synods by language and race from the early 1960s. In 1967 one of its synods declared that "God wills no sameness" (God wil geen eendersheid nie), citing Genesis and Acts 17:26 for the view that every people should keep its own character and territory. In 1974 the NGK synod adopted Ras, Volk en Nasie ("Race, People and Nation"), which held that the New Testament accepts the diversity of peoples and that the visible church should reflect it.

Opposition came from inside the tradition too. In 1952 the Pretoria theologian Ben Marais called segregation in the church un-Christian, and in 1956 the Stellenbosch theologian B. B. Keet published a more direct critique. For years they fought a lonely battle against their church's support for apartheid. After the Sharpeville massacre, the World Council of Churches convened a consultation at Cottesloe in Johannesburg in December 1960. There the NGK's delegates accepted resolutions that found no scriptural grounds for banning mixed marriages, called migrant labour destructive of family life and supported coloured representation in Parliament. After Hendrik Verwoerd publicly distanced the churches from their own delegates, the Transvaal synod (April 1961) and the Cape synod (October 1961) repudiated the resolutions and left the World Council. Apart from a Cape statement in 1963 calling migrant labour a cancer, the Afrikaans churches then made no public criticism of apartheid until 1986. Beyers Naudé, a former moderator of the NGK's Transvaal synod, founded the ecumenical Christian Institute in 1963 and was forced out of the ministry as a result. He was the moving force behind the 1968 Message to the People of South Africa, which rejected apartheid as a false gospel. In 1966 the NGK's General Synod declared the Institute's teaching false doctrine, and the government banned it in 1977. Other critics stayed inside. In 1961 a group of NGK theologians rejected all biblical arguments for apartheid in the book Delayed Action, and in 1966 the Cape synod accepted a report that rejected the idea of a volkskerk. At Potchefstroom, the political scientist L. J. du Plessis called Malan's 1949 slogan "believe in your nation, believe in your God" a confusion of categories. In 1959 he and two colleagues urged the government to talk to the African National Congress, and in the 1960s he warned against "Verwoerdism", calling for brotherhood in place of white domination. His colleagues around the journal Word and Action later argued for a policy of justice, and Potchefstroom University became the first traditionally Afrikaans university to admit black postgraduate students, in 1973.

The decisive challenge came from the churches the NGK had founded for its black and coloured members. In 1978 the synod of the Dutch Reformed Mission Church declared apartheid and its theological justification a heresy. In 1982 the World Alliance of Reformed Churches met in Ottawa, where black South African delegates refused to take communion with white NGK delegates. The Alliance declared apartheid a heresy and suspended the NGK and the NHK, and the NHK then left the Alliance. It set three conditions for their return: open worship, support for those suffering under apartheid, and a clear synodical rejection of the policy. That same year the Mission Church declared a status confessionis, meaning that the gospel itself was at stake, and commissioned the Belhar Confession, drafted by Dirkie Smit, Gustav Bam, Jaap Durand, Allan Boesak and Isak Mentor. Built around unity, reconciliation and justice, it was adopted in 1986. It was the first addition to the confessional basis of the Dutch Reformed family of churches since the Synod of Dort. It explicitly rejected the reasoning behind the 1857 decision and called on the NGK to confess its part in providing apartheid's theological foundations.

Change in the Afrikaans churches came slowly and at a cost. In 1982 the NGK decided only to revise Ras, Volk en Nasie. In 1986 it adopted a new policy document, Kerk en Samelewing ("Church and Society"), which opened the church to all races and held that Scripture offers no grounds for racial separation. Conservatives who rejected it left to found the Afrikaanse Protestantse Kerk on 27 June 1987, with membership limited to white Afrikaners. About 60 ministers and 30,000 members left at first, and another 70,000 followed in the early 1990s. In March 1989 the NGK and its daughter churches together rejected apartheid in all its forms as sin, in the Vereeniging Declaration. The NGK's General Synod of 1990 called apartheid sinful, and at the Rustenburg church conference in November that year the theologian Willie Jonker confessed guilt, on behalf of himself and the NGK, for the wrongs done under apartheid. The church leaders present endorsed his confession. The Gereformeerde Kerk's black synods rejected apartheid in 1983 and 1989. The church as a whole declared in 1985 that the Bible describes rather than prescribes the existence of separate nations, and in 1991 it called the ideology of apartheid a sin and its biblical justification a heresy. The NHK's 1990 pastoral letter rejected racism but said nothing about apartheid or its own whites-only membership rule. On 2 February 1990 F. W. de Klerk, a member of the Gereformeerde Kerk and a Potchefstroom graduate, opened the way to a negotiated end of apartheid.

=== Since 1994 ===
On 14 April 1994, a fortnight before South Africa's first democratic election, the Dutch Reformed Mission Church and most of the Dutch Reformed Church in Africa united at Belhar to form the Uniting Reformed Church in Southern Africa (URCSA), with the Belhar Confession as part of its confessional basis. Congregations that stayed out of the union fought URCSA in the courts over church property for years, until a settlement mediated and partly funded by the NGK was reached in 2012. In 1997 the NGK told the Truth and Reconciliation Commission that apartheid had been wrong more in how it was carried out than in its basic nature, a view its partner churches abroad did not accept. The following year its General Synod adopted a joint resolution with the World Alliance of Reformed Churches and the church was readmitted to full membership. The synod also declared that the content of Belhar was widely accepted in the church and did not conflict with the Three Forms of Unity, although all its regional synods rejected Belhar as part of the confessional basis of a reunited church. In 2004 the General Synod proposed letting each congregation decide for itself, and full reunification with URCSA remained unresolved. Giliomee argues that because it had not accepted Belhar, the condition its sister churches set for reunion, the NGK remained in effect a church for Afrikaners. In 2019 its moderator, Nelis van Rensburg, acknowledged that the church had been complicit in apartheid and had provided its theological basis, and church leaders met victims' support groups and the families of activists killed or persecuted under apartheid. The NGK lost nine per cent of its members between 1981 and 1999, a decline similar to that of the English-speaking churches, although Afrikaners as a group remained strongly committed to Christianity. The decline then accelerated. According to the church's yearbooks, its professing membership fell from 919,790 in 2000 to 691,050 at the start of 2019, a drop of almost a quarter.

The other two sister churches moved more slowly. The NHK made no submission to the Truth Commission. When it dropped its whites-only membership rule in 1997, it kept a description of itself as a volkskerk serving the Afrikaner people, and in 2001 it adopted a confession of guilt without debate. In 2010 its general assembly declared that apartheid could not be theologically justified, withdrew all earlier church approval of it, and removed volkskerk from its church order. A sizeable minority could not accept this. In November 2011, 66 congregations formed a separate confessional grouping, known since 2013 as the Bond van Onafhanklike Hervormde Kerke (League of Independent Hervormde Churches), which regards itself as the true continuation of the Hervormde Kerk and as a volkskerk. By the church's own figures, the NHK had grown to about 170,000 members by 1998, but it lost almost 90,000 professing members over the following two decades. The Gereformeerde Kerk united its black and white seminaries in 1995, the first of the three churches to do so, and in 2006 its regional and general synods became fully multiracial. In 2000 its synod declined to treat the 1991 declaration on apartheid as binding. A public confession of guilt over apartheid came instead from four Potchefstroom theologians, who presented it to the Truth Commission in 1997. In 2015 a statue of Totius was removed from the Potchefstroom campus of North-West University after protests by the student group Reform PUK. By 2025 the Gereformeerde Kerk had about 70,000 members in 382 congregations.

The churches have since gone different ways on questions of church order. The NGK opened the offices of elder and minister to women in 1990, and Gretha Heymans became its first woman minister in Bloemfontein on 20 March 1994. The NHK had opened its ministry to women earlier, in 1975, and admitted Yolanda Dreyer as its first woman minister in 1980. The Gereformeerde Kerk has kept these offices closed to women. Its synod reaffirmed this position in 2009 and later synods upheld it by narrow majorities, but some congregations went on to appoint women as elders, and one was excluded by its classis in 2023. At its General Synod in Potchefstroom in January 2026 the church ruled that every congregation must comply. Congregations with women elders were given a year to reverse the appointments or be treated as having left the denomination. The same synod suspended its memorandum of ecumenical co-operation with the NGK. In July 2026 the church council of George published an open letter refusing to comply with the synod's enforcement decision. The letter did not deal directly with women elders, instead it rejected the claim that non-compliant congregations were guilty of disobedience, arguing that this placed the synod decisions on the level of the Scriptures. The council claimed at least eight other congregations had taken the same position.

Same-sex relationships have proved the most divisive issue. In 2015 the NGK's General Synod allowed congregations to decide for themselves whether to recognise same-sex unions. An extraordinary synod reversed this in November 2016, requiring gay ministers to be celibate and barring ministers from solemnising same-sex unions. In March 2019 the Gauteng High Court in Pretoria set the 2016 decision aside. Calls from congregations to leave the church's synodal structure grew after the 2015 decision, and on 4 May 2023, 56 NGK congregations formed the Koinonia Synod, declaring that they could no longer associate themselves with the General Synod's decisions. The General Synod of 2023 affirmed marriage as the lifelong union of one man and one woman and acknowledged deep division within the church. It left room both for church councils and ministers willing to confirm civil same-sex unions and for those who are not. In 2016 the NHK's general assembly declared that Christians of any sexual orientation are full members of the church, with full access to the sacraments. The Gereformeerde Kerk has held to the traditional view. In 2006 it told Parliament, in what its delegation described as the church's official position, that same-sex marriage should not be legally recognised and that same-sex couples should not adopt children.

== Historiography ==
=== The "Calvinist paradigm" ===
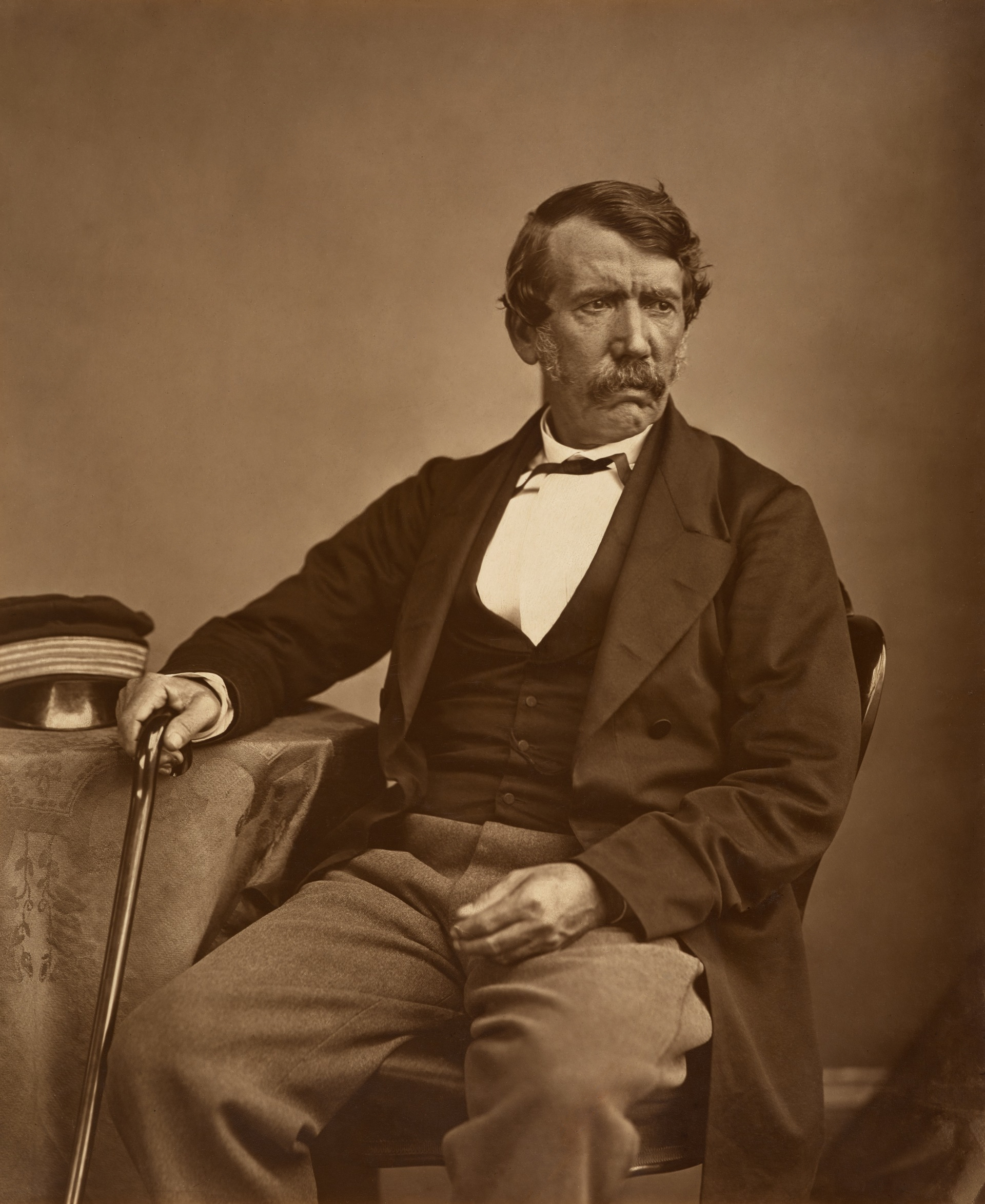
David Livingstone, whose Missionary Travels (1858) spread the image of the Boers as a self-styled chosen people

For much of the 20th century, accounts of Afrikaner history shared a common explanation of where Afrikaner nationalism and racial policy came from. The political scientist André du Toit later named it the "Calvinist paradigm". In this account, the first settlers brought a strict 17th-century Calvinism to the Cape. Cut off on the frontier, it hardened into a "primitive Calvinism" that resurfaced during the Great Trek, and the Voortrekkers came to see themselves as a chosen, covenanted people with a divine mandate over the "heathen" peoples around them. Its supporters usually linked this to the doctrine of predestination, arguing that the election of individuals had been stretched into the election of a whole nation. A literal reading of the Old Testament and folk beliefs such as the curse of Ham were offered as further evidence.

The idea has a history that can be traced. Its earliest clear statement came not from Afrikaners but from the missionary David Livingstone. In an 1849 newspaper letter, and then in his widely read Missionary Travels (1858), he described the Boers as believing themselves God's chosen people. He did so after bitter clashes with Transvaal commandos, and on the strength of remarks by a few individuals. Later British writers, among them John MacKenzie, George McCall Theal and Anthony Trollope, repeated the picture, usually without evidence of their own. Afrikaner nationalists embraced it from the 1880s onwards, because a long Calvinist heritage strengthened their claim to nationhood. By the mid-20th century it had become the standard scholarly account. It was set out in Sheila Patterson's The Last Trek (1957), F. A. van Jaarsveld's work, Moodie's The Rise of Afrikanerdom (1975) and W. A. de Klerk's The Puritans in Africa (1975), and popularised in James Michener's novel The Covenant (1980).

From the late 1970s the paradigm came under sustained attack. In 1979 Giliomee argued that the frontier-Calvinism explanation mistook rationalisation for motivation, and that what mattered was not whether colonists were Calvinist but whether they held power. His co-author Heribert Adam pointed out that English-speaking Natal developed almost identical segregation without any chosen-people beliefs. Hexham argued that the Dutch Reformed Church of the 19th century was evangelical rather than strictly Calvinist, so it could hardly have carried an unbroken tradition from Dort. Du Toit went further. He found that travellers and officials who observed frontier society before the mid-19th century described no chosen-people beliefs at all. They blamed frontier violence on a lack of religion and order, not on any doctrine. The few quotations usually offered as proof turned out, on closer inspection, to come from recent European immigrants or to have been taken out of context. In his view the word "Calvinism" had been used in this literature with almost no doctrinal content. The Cape had also never had the schools, universities and educated clergy that kept a real Calvinist tradition alive in places such as Puritan New England. According to Du Toit, Kruger himself never called the Transvaal burghers a chosen people. Schutte reached similar conclusions for the colonial period. He argued that "primitive Calvinism" mainly reflected 20th-century views, and that the VOC church had baptised and admitted people across racial lines.

Not everyone accepted the full rejection. Gerstner called Du Toit's work serious but argued that it went to the opposite extreme in denying Reformed theology any effect during the Dutch period. He held that the prevailing understanding of covenant and infant baptism encouraged colonists to see Christians and "heathen" as two fixed groups, though he explicitly denied a direct causal link to segregation. He found the language of Israel and Zion common among colonial clergy, but conceded that the sources could not show whether ordinary colonists thought of themselves as a chosen people before the Great Trek. In the end he regarded religion and the slave economy as having grown up side by side, and the question of which shaped the other as insoluble. Giliomee also found evidence that some Voortrekkers, especially among the Doppers, saw themselves as specially chosen, though he stressed that this was never a mainstream doctrine. Others looked to material causes. Worden traced racial division mainly to the labour relations of the slave economy.

Once the paradigm was set aside, the question became which Calvinism, if any, shaped Afrikaner nationalism, and when. Hexham located the source in the Dutch neo-Calvinism that reached the small Gereformeerde Kerk after 1902. In his account the Doppers, who already kept themselves apart from other Christians through strict church discipline, projected this "religious apartheid" onto the nation, and their Potchefstroom intellectuals became the main authors of nationalist ideology. He summed up the irony by saying that the Doppers were Calvinists who became nationalists, while most Afrikaners were nationalists who paid lip service to Calvinism. Du Toit accepted that this stream was distinctive, but considered its role in the rise of apartheid minor and Hexham's emphasis out of proportion. Giliomee agreed that neo-Calvinism never won majority support among nationalists. He explained the zeal for apartheid mainly by Afrikaners' preoccupation with their survival as a people, while giving weight to the NGK's mission theology as one of its main ideological sources. Schutte placed the weight on secular nationalist leaders such as Hertzog and Malan, and on the social and economic upheavals of the period, rather than on theology. Van Wyk pointed out that NGK ministers and missionaries worked out a theology of apartheid before the Potchefstroom theologians did. For de Gruchy, Calvinism did not cause Afrikaner nationalism or racism but was later adapted to legitimate them, and it was this legitimation, not Calvinism as such, that became heretical. In his view the problem in South Africa had been "the absence of a truly Reformed theology".

=== Kuyper and apartheid ===
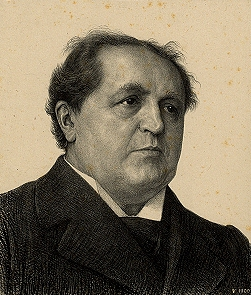
Abraham Kuyper (1837–1920), Dutch theologian, statesman and founder of neo-Calvinism

Kuyper's name comes up constantly in debates about the origins of apartheid, and how much responsibility he bears is still disputed. By the late 1980s his reputation in South African Reformed circles had suffered badly, largely because apartheid theology leaned so heavily on the language of "creation ordinances" associated with his school. Three of his ideas sit at the centre of the debate. The first is sphere sovereignty, set out in his inaugural address at the Free University in 1880, which held that family, church, state, science and other spheres of life each answer directly to God and must not be absorbed by one another. The second is common grace, by which God restrains sin in the world and allows the potential hidden in creation to unfold. The third is the "pluriformity" of the church, the view that the one invisible church may rightly take many visible forms. Kuyper developed it in his struggle against the Dutch national church. In 1886 he led his followers out of the Dutch state church, the Netherlands Reformed Church, in protest at its theological liberalism, a breakaway known as the Doleantie. In 1892 they united with the earlier Seceders of 1834 to form the Reformed Churches in the Netherlands.

The strongest case against Kuyper comes from Piet Naudé. He identifies Kuyper as one of three roots of apartheid theology, alongside the German missiologist Gustav Warneck's idea of a separate national church for each people and a pietist reading of Scripture that discouraged critical study of the Bible. In his reading, Kuyper's account of common grace allowed the peoples of the world to be ranked by their level of development, and opened the door to a racism with theological backing. He also sees Kuyper's link to apartheid's use of Scripture as more direct than Warneck's. Moodie similarly judged that Kuyper's doctrine of creation ordinances came dangerously close to the German theology of the orders of creation. Willie Jonker focuses on the church. He shows that Kuyper developed pluriformity as a weapon against the Dutch national church, for confessional rather than racial reasons, and that he built it on 19th-century organic and evolutionary thinking rather than on Scripture. Jonker concludes that South African theologians nonetheless had some justification for appealing to Kuyper when they argued for separate churches for separate peoples, and that his influence on this was "incalculably great". Kuyper's own writings also contain openly racial passages, including in his 1900 pamphlet on the South African crisis and in his work on common grace.

Others reject the idea that Kuyper fathered apartheid. Kobus Smit points out that Kuyper's lectures on Calvinism praise the mixing of peoples as necessary for human progress, do not treat the volk as a sphere of its own, and present the state as a result of the fall. He adds that Kuyper called the nation a creation ordinance only once in all his writings. In Smit's summary, Kuyper "never propagated apartheid, but upliftment". Kuyper also rejected the idea of a national church altogether, calling a church bound to a single people a heathen or Jewish notion. In 1896 he drew up rules for founding churches in the Dutch East Indies under which people of different races were to share one church unless language or confession divided them. Patrick Baskwell takes a middle position. Sphere sovereignty, he argues, gave apartheid its "form and structure". But the Dutch system of pillarisation that grew out of it was voluntary, while apartheid was imposed by the state, and Kuyper deeply distrusted state power. In Baskwell's phrase, Kuyper was at most apartheid's "grandfather or great-uncle". De Gruchy describes Afrikaner Calvinism as a Calvinism in search of a theological worldview, which found one in Kuyper but used his ideas selectively.

On several points the sources agree. The Afrikaner thinkers who drew on Kuyper went well beyond him, adapting and in places distorting his ideas. Stoker made the volk a sphere of its own with a divine calling, Totius grounded racial separation in creation and called integration sinful, and F. J. M. Potgieter held that the diversity of peoples and churches was ordained to last until the end of time. The two texts on which apartheid theology finally rested, Genesis 11 and Acts 17:26, did not come from Kuyper, and the segregationist reading of the Tower of Babel was already current in Western thought long before him. The NGK's call for a law against mixed marriages has even been criticised as a breach of sphere sovereignty, because it asked the state to legislate in a matter belonging to the family and the church. Kuyper's legacy in South Africa was not one-sided either. Opponents of apartheid such as Allan Boesak and de Gruchy turned Kuyper's own principles against the apartheid form of "Kuyperianism", and appeals to the wider body of Calvin's writings helped undo the ideology that a narrower Calvinism had helped to build.

== See also ==
- Belhar Confession
- Neo-Calvinism
- Afrikaner Broederbond
- Day of the Vow
