= Reformed Churches in South Africa =

Reformed Protestant denomination in Southern Africa

- Gereformeerde Kerke in Suid-Afrika
- Abbreviation: GKSA, RCSA
- Classification: Protestant
- Orientation: Continental Reformed
- Scripture: Protestant Bible
- Theology: Reformed
- Polity: Presbyterian
- Chairman: G. J. Meijer (2026)
- Associations: International Conference of Reformed Churches; World Reformed Fellowship
- Region: South Africa; Namibia; Zimbabwe
- Language: Afrikaans; English; About 13 others
- Headquarters: Administrative Bureau, Potchefstroom
- Origin: 10–11 February 1859; Rustenburg, South African Republic
- Separated from: Nederduitsch Hervormde Kerk van Afrika
- Congregations: 296–371 (2026)
- Members: c. 70,000 (2025)
- Ministers: 225 (2026)
- Seminaries: Theological School Potchefstroom; Gereformeerde Teologiese Akademie (Reformed Theological Academy)
- Official website: gksa.org.za

The Reformed Churches in South Africa (Afrikaans: Gereformeerde Kerke in Suid-Afrika, GKSA; also abbreviated RCSA) is a confessional Reformed denomination in South Africa, with a few congregations in Namibia and Zimbabwe. Its members are popularly known as Doppers. It is the smallest of the three Afrikaans Reformed sister churches, alongside the Dutch Reformed Church (NGK) and the Nederduitsch Hervormde Kerk (NHK), and today reports between about 300 and 370 congregations worshipping in some fifteen languages. The church holds to the Three Forms of Unity, is governed by the Church Order of Dort, and sings only psalms and scriptural hymns in worship. It belongs to the International Conference of Reformed Churches and the World Reformed Fellowship.

The church was founded at Rustenburg in the South African Republic in February 1859, when a group of members, among them Paul Kruger, left the NHK, mainly over the evangelical hymns that the NHK had in effect made compulsory, and called the Dutch minister Dirk Postma as their first pastor. Its theological school, opened at Burgersdorp in 1869, moved to Potchefstroom in 1905 and gave rise to the Potchefstroom University for Christian Higher Education, the main centre of Kuyperian neo-Calvinism in South Africa. Although it counted only about a tenth of Afrikaners, the church had an influence on Afrikaner nationalism well beyond its size. Like the other Afrikaans Reformed churches it supported apartheid, and from the 1960s it organised its members into racially separate synods. It also produced some of apartheid's earliest Afrikaner critics. In 1991 it declared the ideology of apartheid as a sin, and in 2006 it brought its synods back together. Since 2009 it has barred women from serving as elders or ministers, and in 2026 it moved to enforce that decision on congregations that had not complied.

== Name ==
The Afrikaans name Gereformeerde Kerke in Suid-Afrika is translated by the church as "Reformed Churches in South Africa". The word gereformeerd ("Reformed") also appears in the name of the much larger Nederduitse Gereformeerde Kerk, and outside commentators have often attributed the views of the small Gereformeerde Kerk to the larger "Dutch Reformed Church". Within the NGK, "the Gereformeerde" could also mean a strict Reformed strand of piety, and in the 1930s one NGK critic of Dopper influence called the GKSA the "(Narrow) Reformed Church".

The nickname "Dopper" is older than the church. From about the 1760s it was used for a distinct community of conservative frontier farmers in the north-eastern Cape Colony, who were known for their dislike of hymn singing. Kruger himself usually wore the short-cut black jacket associated with them. Where the name comes from is uncertain. One explanation derives it from the Dutch dorper ("town dweller"), after the small border settlements where many Doppers lived. Another links it to dop (a basin), after an old-fashioned haircut cut around a bowl. The Doppers themselves preferred domper, a candle snuffer, because they had "extinguished" the new light of the Enlightenment and kept to the old ways.

Outsiders saw the Doppers in different ways. Kruger's community was considered more pious and socially conservative than any other in the colony. One Free State observer, recalling the year 1858, described them as a "peculiar sect" who saw themselves as a "Divinely favored people" like Israel, and the wife of the NGK minister Andrew Murray wrote in 1857 that they were "very religious, but prejudiced and ignorant". Into the early 20th century, members of the church were often looked down on as backward and poorly educated.

== History ==
=== Background ===
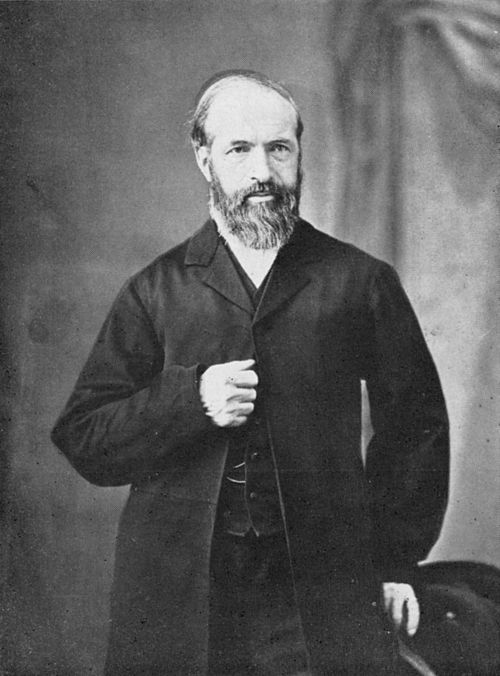
Dirk Postma, the first pastor of the GKSA

For most of the colonial period the Reformed church at the Cape sang from a metrical psalter, first Petrus Datheen's Dutch translation of the Genevan Psalter and, from 1776, a new Dutch rhyming of the psalms. No great change came until 1814, when the colonial church added a collection of Evangelische Gezangen ("evangelical hymns"). Many conservative members saw the hymns as doctrinally impure and associated them with liberal theology. Because the hymns were bound into the back of family Bibles, some saw them as "adding another Gospel" to Scripture. Disputes over the hymns broke out in congregations such as Colesberg from the 1830s, and objectors came under real pressure. At Cradock a precentor was dismissed for singing only the tune when a hymn was given out. At Colesberg the minister demanded written agreement that the hymns accorded with Scripture from anyone seeking baptism, marriage or admission as a confessing member, and he refused to baptise the children of objectors. In the early 1840s a classis issued a pastoral letter accusing the objectors of grave sin, a stance the synod upheld, and many of them stayed away from the Lord's Supper for years. The dissenters also complained that preaching neglected the doctrines of election and the covenant, and they objected to the way the church was governed.

Relatively few Doppers took part in the Great Trek, but by the 1850s there were Dopper communities in the Free State and the Transvaal as well as in the Cape. In the Transvaal the Volksraad recognised the Nederduitsch Hervormde Kerk as the state church in 1853. How far the church conflicts of the 1850s were about doctrine is debated. The political scientist André du Toit has argued that they turned mainly on the relationship between church and state and on questions of church authority.

In the Netherlands, meanwhile, the Secession of 1834 had produced a church that broke away from the Dutch state church over liberal theology, state control and the use of hymns, and that held strictly to the Synod of Dort. In 1857 J. J. Venter, a Free State politician, wrote to the Seceders asking for a minister faithful to Dort. Their synod decided that year to send someone to investigate and chose Dirk Postma. Born at Dokkum in Friesland in 1818, Postma had been apprenticed as a tinsmith before training for the ministry under the Seceder theologian T. F. de Haan.

=== Founding (1859) ===
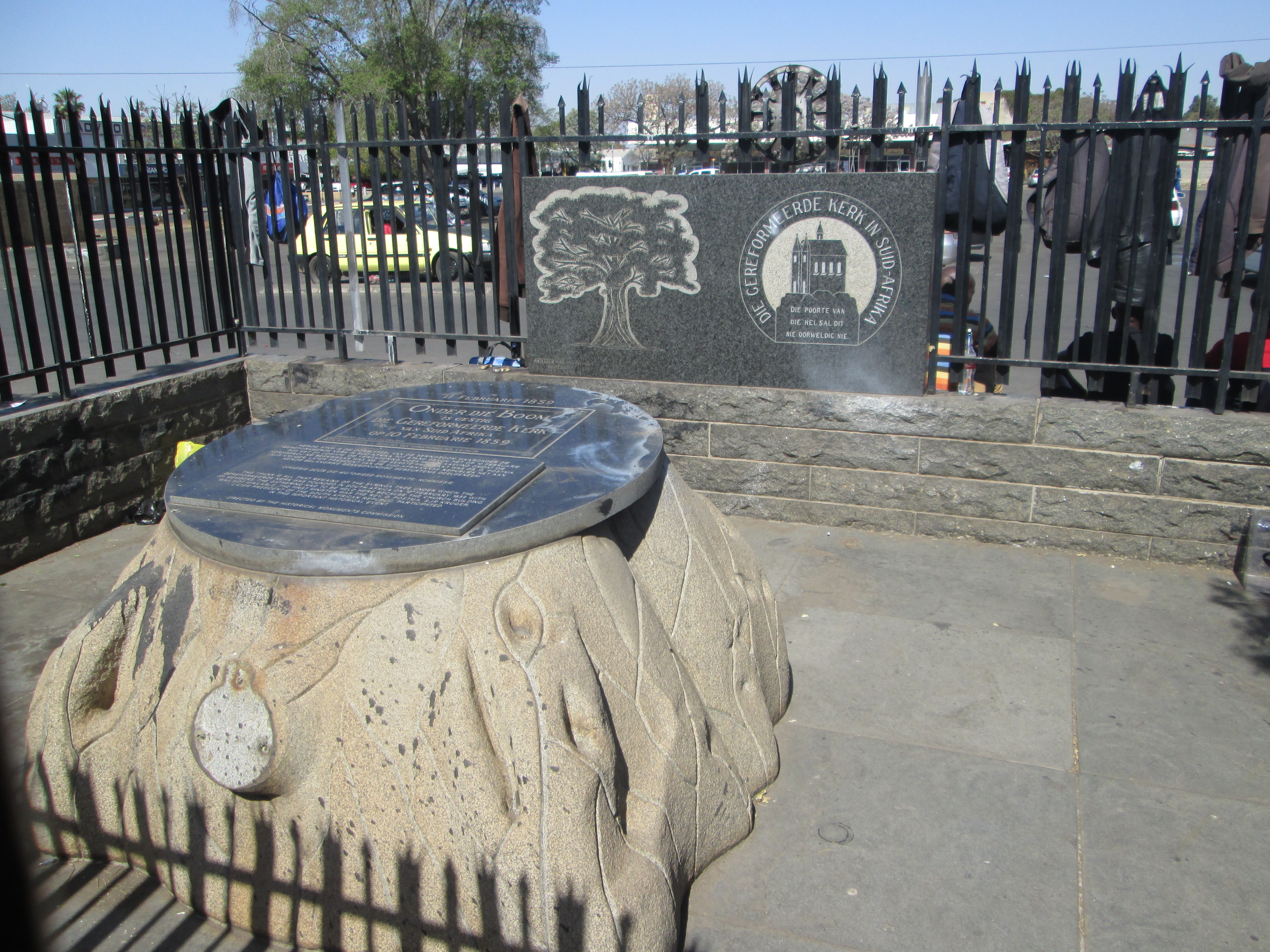
The Syringa Tree Monument in Church Street, Rustenburg, marks the place where the church was founded in 1859.

Postma arrived at the Cape in 1858 and travelled by way of Durban to the Transvaal. At Rustenburg, objectors had sought assurance since 1853 that they would not be forced to sing hymns. In January 1859 the general assembly of the NHK met at Rustenburg. It left the use of hymns to the conscience of each minister and declined to accept Postma's conditions, which in effect made the hymns compulsory. Fifteen men then withdrew from the NHK. On 10 and 11 February 1859, at a meeting held under a syringa tree (seringboom) at Rustenburg, about 310 people enrolled as members of the new church and called Postma as their minister. Paul Kruger was among the founding members and took a leading part in the break with the state church. The site of the meeting is marked by the Syringa Tree Monument, now a heritage site.

The causes of the schism have been debated ever since, with historians from each of the three Afrikaans churches writing their own accounts. GKSA historians present the founding as a return to Reformed doctrine, worship and church order. One NHK historian argued that the dispute was essentially about hymn singing rather than doctrine, that Postma himself was not strongly opposed to hymns, and that the separation was therefore not justified. The sociologist T. Dunbar Moodie concluded that the founders left "largely because" they objected to hymns, though deeper theological concerns may also have weighed with Postma.

=== Early growth (1859–1902) ===
The new church spread quickly. A Free State congregation formed at Torbrek in May 1859, followed by Burgersdorp in January 1860 and Middelburg and Colesberg in the Cape that December. Within a year it had seven congregations and some 2,250 members. Five churches met at Reddersburg in 1862 for the first synod, which adopted the Church Order of Dort. Only one more minister came from the Netherlands, so Postma trained local men himself. The NGK minister Andrew Murray regretted the secession, but admitted to his brother that his own evangelical circle had never reached "the real stiff dopper mind" and hoped the new ministers might. By 1868 the church had 4,362 members in sixteen congregations, and by 1899 it had 10,678 in 43.

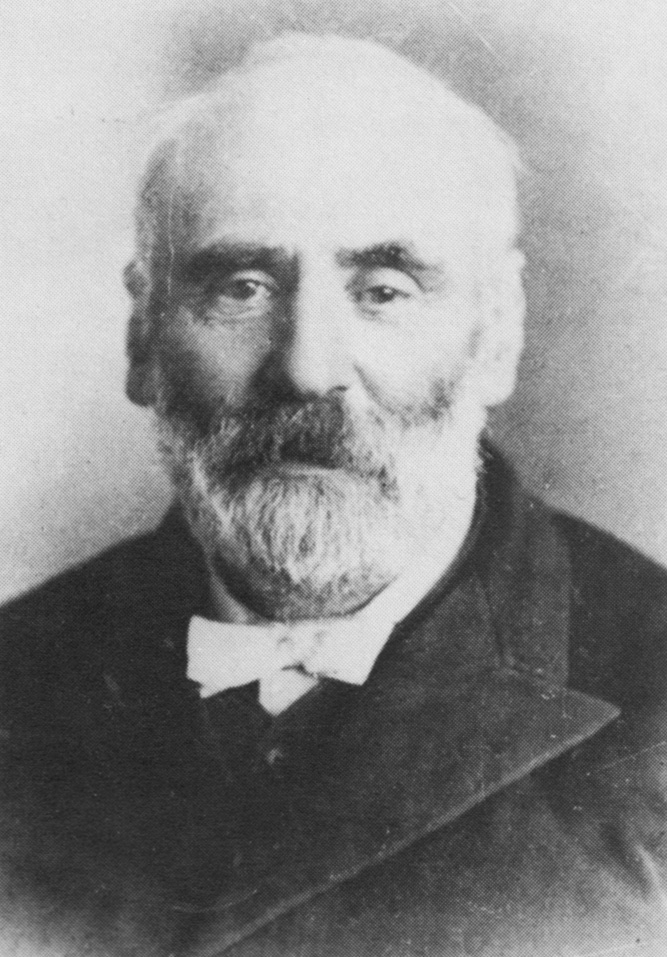
Jan Lion Cachet, the church's first full-time professor of theology

Education became a priority from the start. On 29 November 1869 Postma opened a theological school at Burgersdorp, with a "literary department" that prepared students for the BA degree of the University of the Cape of Good Hope. His colleague there was Jan Lion Cachet, an Amsterdam-born convert from Judaism who had been educated in the household of the poet Isaäc da Costa. Cachet became the church's first full-time professor of theology in 1894, and in 1873 he founded the monthly De Maandbode, renamed Het Kerkblad in 1896. Postma's own Kort Begrip der Kristelike Religie (1888) became the most widely used local summary of doctrine. By 1899 the church ran some 142 schools teaching about 3,000 children. John Murray wrote in 1877 that Postma had "given an impulse to the cause of education among a retrograde people".

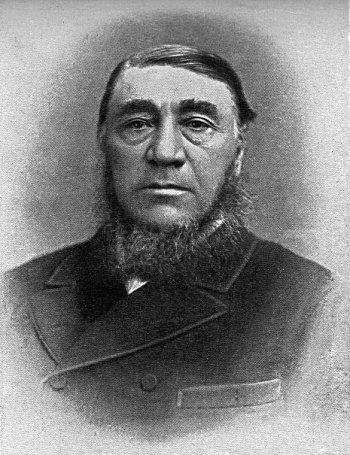
Paul Kruger, a founding member of the church and president of the South African Republic from 1883 to 1902

Kruger remained the church's best-known member. He had had only about three months of schooling, but was deeply religious and, later in life, strongly influenced by Calvinism. When President T. F. Burgers proposed secular state education in the 1870s, Kruger feared "the fall of Christendom". Relations between the three Reformed churches in the South African Republic were cool, and each watched the others with suspicion. GKSA members could be censured for taking communion or having their children baptised in the NGK. Between 1897 and about 1911, several NGK congregations seceded under S. J. du Toit to form the Reformed Churches under the Cross, and by 1914 these had joined the GKSA.

The church's early stance on race was mixed. Its general synods of 1891, 1907 and 1918 discussed interracial marriages between white members and African, Indian and Coloured partners respectively, and judged them "unseemly" and socially disruptive but not sinful in themselves. The church supported mission work from its early years, but most members accepted missions only if converts did not worship together with whites, and its own mission effort in the Transvaal remained small. Disputes over race contributed to splits at Bethulie in 1877 and among the Dorsland trekkers at Humpata in Angola in 1908.

The Second Boer War (1899–1902) fell heavily on the church. Of its roughly 10,700 members, 180 men were killed in battle and 431 women and 1,428 children died in the concentration camps. The church opened orphanages at Bethulie in 1903 and Rustenburg in 1905, and appealed to fellow Calvinists in the Netherlands and the United States for help. Totius, the son of S. J. du Toit, served for about nine months as a military chaplain with the Boer forces.

=== Consolidation (1902–1962) ===
The church came out of the war small and widely seen as backward, but it grew steadily over the following decades. By 1904 it had about 12,000 members in 48 congregations, and by 1950 it had 153 congregations with 41,961 confessing members.

The synod of April 1904 decided to move the theological school to Potchefstroom, where it opened in February 1905. The church sent its most promising students to the Free University of Amsterdam, founded by Kuyper, which future Potchefstroom lecturers came to regard as their "Mecca". Among them were Ferdinand Postma and J. D. du Toit (Totius). Totius became professor of theology at Potchefstroom in 1911, edited Het Kerkblad, and was one of the translators of the first Afrikaans Bible, published in 1933. His metrical psalter of 1936 is still one of the church's two official versions. The church accepted Afrikaans for worship in 1917. By the 1920s Potchefstroom had a recognisable school of Kuyperian scholars, among them the philosopher H. G. Stoker and the educationist J. Chr. Coetzee. Theology lectures drew heavily on Kuyper and Herman Bavinck. The school's literary department grew into Potchefstroom University College, which became a full university in 1951.

Officially the church sought friendly relations with other churches and worked with them on matters such as education and social work, while refusing to compromise on what it saw as principle. Its strictness still brought it into conflict with the NGK. Totius attacked the NGK-backed Christelijk Strevers Vereeniging in 1905 and 1906 as Methodist and "thoroughly Arminian". In 1912 the NGK's Transvaal moderator, H. S. Bosman, accused the GKSA of betraying Calvinism and of a political preoccupation inspired by Kuyper, and the GKSA replied that he had misunderstood Kuyper. In 1928 Totius testified against the Stellenbosch professor Johannes du Plessis in his heresy case. Seven years later, writers from all three Afrikaans Reformed churches contributed to Koers in die Krisis, a collection of Calvinist essays published by the Federation of Calvinist Student Associations.

Church discipline remained strict. In a sample of congregations between 1902 and 1919, only two cases of censure ended in excommunication, and both involved a close association with a person who was not white. Mission work stayed small, partly because the church's limited funds went into projects such as Potchefstroom University College. The church also spread beyond South Africa's borders. In 1952 delegates came to synod from Lusaka and N'Kana in Northern Rhodesia, Enkeldoorn in Southern Rhodesia and Eldoret in Kenya. In 1957 the church's non-Afrikaans-speaking congregations held their first assembly.

The church's standing changed markedly over the 20th century. After the Anglo-Boer War its members were widely regarded as backward, yet its influence soon came to be "out of all proportion to their small numbers". Although it had only about 8 per cent of Afrikaners as members in the 1970s, it was by then regularly counted with the NGK and the NHK as one of the three Afrikaans Reformed sister churches. The three are often described as the "mainstream" Afrikaans churches akin to the mainline churches in America, and they cooperate through the Inter-Church Council.

=== National synods and reunification (1962–2009) ===
In 1961 the synod rejected racial mixing in church life as a principle and a rule. Over the following years the church adopted a model of separate "national" synods, a "church of peoples" in which each ethnic group had its own synod. Alongside the white Synod Potchefstroom it created the Synod Middellande for black congregations, the Synod Soutpansberg for Venda- and Tsonga-speaking members and the Synod Suidland for Coloured members. The four met together in a General Synod, first convened at Potchefstroom in the mid-1960s, in which white delegates were in the minority. The white synod of 1967 declared that "God wil geen eendersheid nie" (God does not want sameness), that each people should preserve its own character and territory, and that more developed peoples had a duty of guardianship towards others. In 1970 it endorsed territorial separation.

Pressure to change came first from the black synods. The Synod Middellande rejected church and political apartheid in 1983, and Middellande, Suidland and Soutpansberg repeatedly asked for the ethnic structures to be abolished. In 1985 the white synod declared that what Scripture says about nations is descriptive rather than prescriptive. It withdrew the 1970 decision, rejected "every form of racial domination and racism", and stated that mixed marriages could not be called sinful. The 1988 synod replaced the 1967 wording without formally revoking it. In 1991 the synod accepted a recommendation of the Reformed Ecumenical Synod and declared the ideology of apartheid a sin and its biblical justification a heresy. By then the joint structure was breaking down. The Soutpansberg synod suspended its participation in 1988, the Suidland synod stopped meeting separately in 1990, and the last general synod under the old arrangement met in 1992.

After 1994 the church moved faster to unify its structures than before. In 1995 it combined the theological training of black and white students at Potchefstroom, the first of the three Afrikaans sister churches to do so. D. Mashau in 2003 and R. Letsosa in 2006 became the first black professors to teach white theological students. In 2003 the synod accepted the principle that churches should be grouped by geography rather than ethnicity. On the past, the 1994 synod received majority and minority reports on the 1991 decision, the 1997 synod declined to consider the church's accountability for apartheid, and the 2000 synod declined to make the 1991 decision binding on all assemblies. In 1997 four GKSA theologians, A. du Plessis, B. J. van der Walt, J. H. van Wyk and P. Venter, presented a personal confession of guilt to the Truth and Reconciliation Commission, although this was not an act of the synod.

In 2006 the national synods were dissolved. Regional synods and the General Synod became fully multiracial, also the first among the three Afrikaans churches to do so, although the Soutpansberg synod and the classis of Tshwane did not join the new arrangement. The first unified General Synod met in 2009.

== Doctrine and worship ==
=== Confession and theology ===
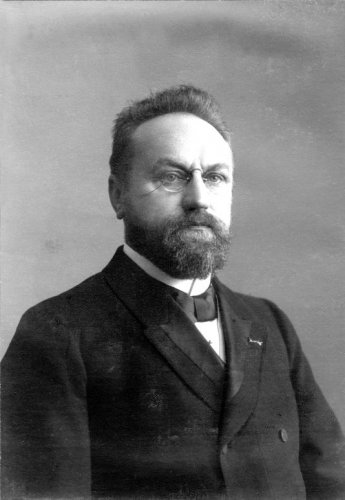
Herman Bavinck, the Dutch theologian whose Reformed Dogmatics shaped the GKSA's theology

The GKSA describes the Bible as the infallible Word of God and takes the historic sola scriptura position as its starting point. Its confessional basis is the Three Forms of Unity, the Belgic Confession, the Heidelberg Catechism and the Canons of Dort, together with the three ecumenical creeds (the Apostles' Creed, the Nicene Creed and the Athanasian Creed). The church presents the confessions not as its own word but as a summary of Scripture. Ministers, professors, elders and deacons must subscribe to and sign the Three Forms as adopted at the Synod of Dort. In line with Reformed covenant theology, children of members are baptised as heirs of God's covenant, and the baptismal form presents baptism as having replaced circumcision.

GKSA theology has been described as strongly confessional, with the kingdom of God as a central theme. Moodie described the church in the 1970s as the most theologically conservative of the three Afrikaans churches, an observation that still reflects the character of the church more than 50 years later. Its theologians have long contrasted their tradition with the Methodist and Pietist strands they saw in the NGK, and in 1980 one of them, J. H. van Wyk, warned that these tendencies would greatly hinder closer relations between the two churches. Kuyper's theology entered the church largely through Totius, but it was mainly Herman Bavinck's dogmatics that shaped it. The church long worked with Kuyper's distinction between the church as institute and the church as organism, and it has kept up a strong interest in education. At Potchefstroom, Stoker developed a programme of Christian scholarship in the same tradition as the Dutch philosopher Herman Dooyeweerd, who was guest of honour at the university's celebrations in 1951.

=== Worship ===
GKSA services are simple in form and last about an hour, with the sermon at the centre and congregational singing from the psalms and Skrifberymings. The synods laid down the order of worship in 1927, 1955 and 1985. The 1985 order consists of the votum, the opening blessing, congregational singing, the creed, the Law, Scripture reading, prayers, the reading and preaching of the Word, the offering and the closing blessing. These rules place particular weight on the sermon. Traditionally ministers wear no robes, and the Lord's Supper has been served with common cups at a table rather than with individual glasses in the pews.

The Lord's Supper is held at least every three months, during a service and under the supervision of the elders. It is open to those who have professed the Reformed faith and lead a godly life, and members of other churches need a testimonial from their own church. In 1997 the synod decided that baptised children who believe in Christ and meet the requirements of 1 Corinthians 11 may be admitted. On Sundays, usually at the second service, ministers preach through the Heidelberg Catechism, aiming to cover it each year. The church stresses that this is preaching, not a lecture in doctrine. The observance of Christmas, Easter, Ascension and Pentecost is left to each local church, with many churches also including the Day of the Vow as an additional observance. The church uses set liturgical forms for baptism, the Lord's Supper, public profession of faith, ordination, marriage, excommunication and readmission, which only the General Synod may change. Children are taught in catechism classes, which since 1873 have been based on Postma's Kort Begrip and the Heidelberg Catechism and aim to lead them to a personal profession of faith.

=== Song ===
Although the GKSA is often described as a psalm-singing church, it has never sung psalms alone. The first synod in 1862 kept the Dutch psalter of 1773 together with the few other Scripture-based songs approved by the Synod of Dort. Totius's Afrikaans psalms were received in 1936 and came into use the following year, and in 1942 the synod released 48 Skrifberymings, versified passages from other parts of the Bible, for congregations that wished to use them. A revised psalm book shared with the NGK and NHK followed in 1977. A new versification, mainly by the poet T. T. Cloete, appeared in 2001, and the 2003 synod had it published together with Totius's version in the Psalmboek, which came into use on 26 October 2003. Each church council may decide which version to sing, and objections to the new psalms were still being lodged at the 2006 synod.

In 2012 the synod amended article 69 of the Church Order. Congregations must still sing the 150 psalms and the versified Ten Commandments, Lord's Prayer, Apostles' Creed and canticles, but other Skrifberymings and "Scripture-faithful songs" approved by the synod are now left to the freedom of each church. Critics within the church have argued that this broke with its tradition of singing only Scripture. The current Psalmboek contains 79 Skrifberymings, eleven more have been approved since, and the synod has also cleared 23 songs from the ecumenical Liedboek van die Kerk for optional use.

=== Church life ===
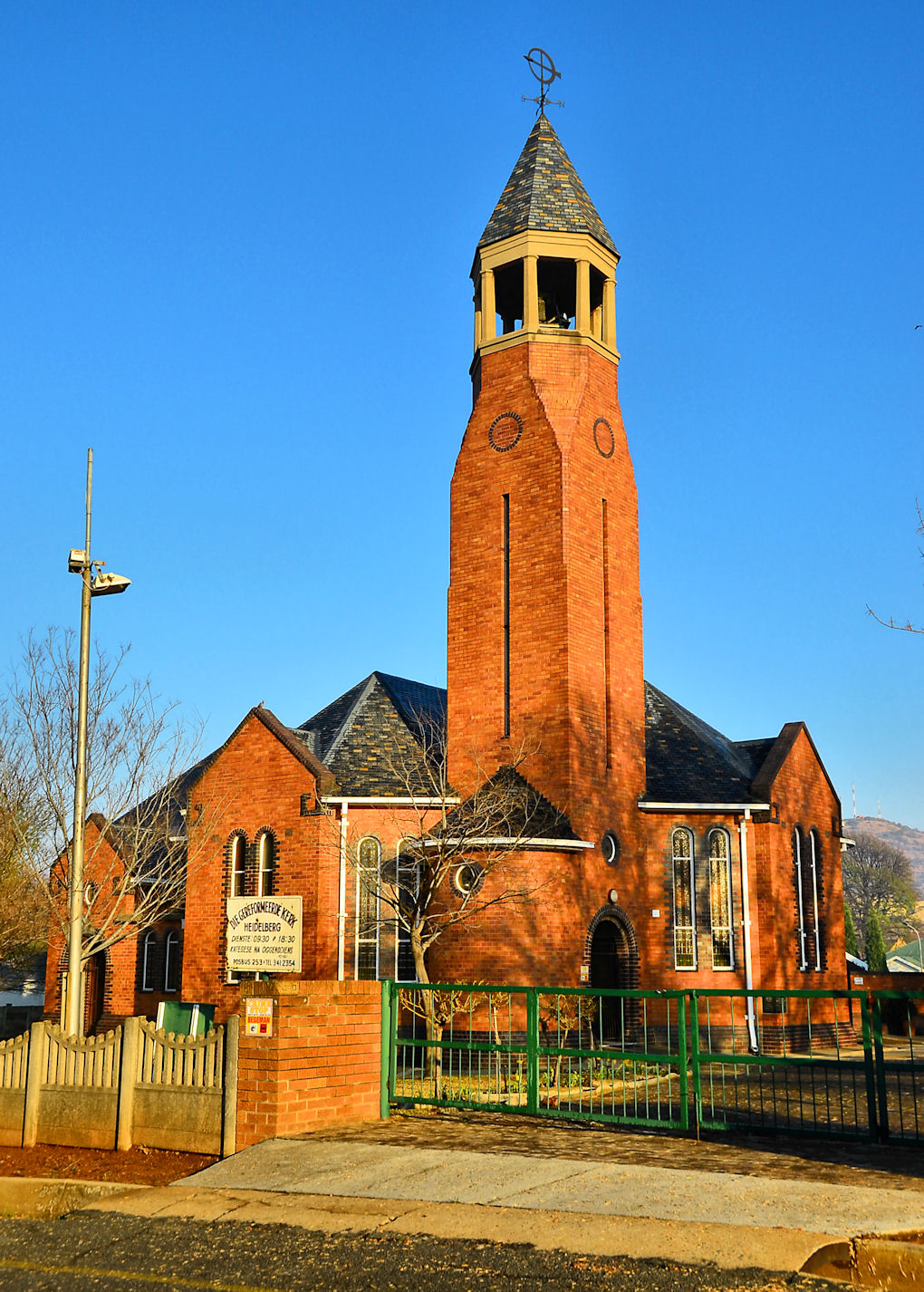
The Gereformeerde Kerk in Heidelberg, Gauteng

Church discipline follows the steps of Matthew 18, from private admonition to suspension from the sacraments and, as a last resort, excommunication. Office-bearers also exercise mutual oversight (censura morum). The church's own summary presents discipline as restorative rather than punitive. In a report accepted by the synod in the early 2000s, the church held that Sunday is not a transferred Sabbath but a feast day given above all to worship rather than rest.

The Doppers were long known for a sober piety. Every form of religious enthusiasm or display was distasteful to them, and they valued plain dress and an ordered family life. A study of church records from 1902 to 1919 found that they objected at various times to dancing, the theatre, the cinema, boxing and mixed bathing, but never to smoking or drinking alcohol, on the principle that nothing God created is evil in itself. Weddings were simple affairs without bridesmaids, best men or organ music. Rather than holding regular prayer meetings as the NGK did, the church called special days of prayer in times of drought, war and epidemic. The Lord's Supper was then held quarterly after elders had visited members in their homes.

On sexuality the church holds to the traditional view that marriage is between one man and one woman. Its synod adopted a decision on sexual ethics in 2003, which it reaffirmed in its discussions with the NGK reported to the 2026 synod. In 2006 its delegation told Parliament, in what it described as the church's official position, that same-sex marriage should not be legally recognised and that same-sex couples should not adopt children.

== Organisation ==
The GKSA is a federation of local churches rather than a single centralised body. Each congregation is regarded as a complete church, and the churches are bound together by the confessions and a common Church Order. The church describes the principle as "no church may rule over another church, and no office-bearer over another". Hexham noted that, despite the church's Presbyterian inheritance, this gives its government a "strongly Congregational tone", a position not uncommon in the continental reformed churches. The federation has between about 300 and 370 congregations, worshipping in about fifteen languages, most of them in South Africa and a few in Namibia and Zimbabwe. Its administrative bureau is in Potchefstroom.

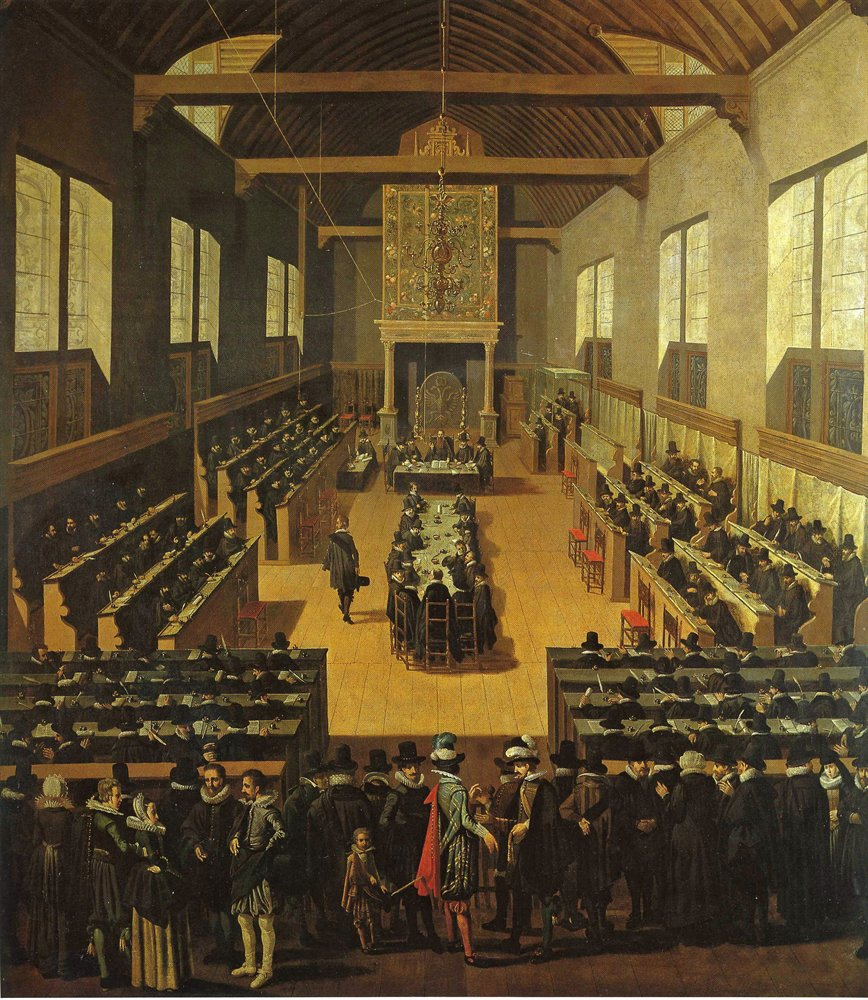
The Synod of Dordrecht, from which the GKSA derives its Church Order

=== Church government ===
The church has three offices: minister of the Word, elder and deacon, with professors of theology counted as ministers. Each local church is governed by its church council of ministers, elders and deacons. Neighbouring churches meet in a classis of about ten to fifteen churches, the classes meet in regional synods, usually once a year, and the General Synod normally meets every three years. There are seven regional synods: Bosveld, Eastern, Free State and KwaZulu-Natal, North West, Pretoria, Randvaal and Southern. Until 1961 these were known as particular synods. The church counts 56 synods between 1862 and 2026. Since the first unified General Synod of 2009, the General Synod has met in 2012, 2015, 2018, 2023 and 2026, with an extraordinary session in 2016.

The Church Order, adopted at the first synod in 1862, is based on the church order drawn up at the Synod of Dort in 1618–1619. Only the General Synod may amend it. Article 30 restricts church assemblies to church matters handled in a church manner. Under Kuyper's influence this was long read narrowly, so that political and social questions were treated as lying outside the church's competence. Under article 31, decisions of the assemblies are settled and binding unless they are shown to conflict with Scripture or the Church Order. A church that objects must appeal through the assemblies rather than simply disregard a decision. Disputes over how far this binds congregations have been central to the conflict over women in church office.

=== Theological education ===
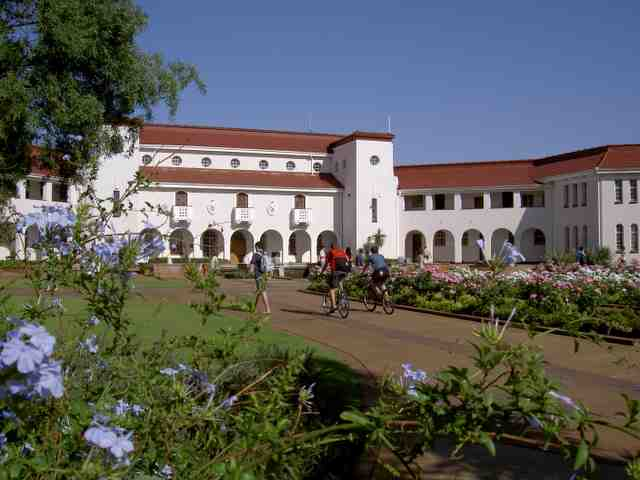
The Potchefstroom University for Christian Higher Education, now part of the North-West University

The church has trained its own ministers since its early years, at first in the homes of Postma and a colleague and from 1869 at the theological school at Burgersdorp. The school moved to Potchefstroom in 1905, and it has remained there since. Its literary department, made separate in 1876, developed into Potchefstroom University College, which became the independent Potchefstroom University for Christian Higher Education in 1951. The university remained close to the church but independent of it. It was the only university college in South Africa that had taught in Dutch and Afrikaans from the beginning. The church's theological school continued alongside it under a series of agreements, with ministers trained in the university's faculty of theology. In 1995 the church's separate schools at Potchefstroom, Hammanskraal and Heidelberg were merged into a single training centre at Potchefstroom.

In 2004 the university merged with the University of North-West to form the North-West University (NWU), and in 2006 the church approved a new agreement with the NWU. In 2019 the university raised concerns about that agreement and later proposed new terms. According to the church, these would have given the university control over the whole theology curriculum and the professors' time, and left the church no say in appointments. On 3 February 2023 the General Synod declined to sign and approved the establishment of the church's own Gereformeerde Teologiese Akademie (GTA), known in English as the Reformed Theological Academy. The NWU had stated that it would end the 2006 agreement if the church did not sign, and that agreement runs until December 2026. The academy, which dates its own founding to 2021, is an independent non-profit company under the supervision of the church's curators. In 2026 the General Synod designated the GTA as the church's training institution and also approved a route for training through Mukhanyo Theological College.

== Women in church office ==
The GKSA first took up the question of women in office in 1973, when it adopted the recommendations of the Reformed Ecumenical Synod. These held that Scripture excludes women from the offices of ruling and teaching elder, but encouraged churches to use women in diaconal service. Study committees reported to the synods of 1982 and 1985. The 1985 report leaned towards opening the offices, especially the diaconate, to women, but the synod found flaws in it and did not rule. In 1988 the synod ended the study and stated that women do not hold the special offices, in recognition of male headship. Objections to that decision were rejected in 1994, 2000 and 2003.

The 2003 synod admitted women as deacons, though the theologian J. M. Vorster notes that it did so without much further argument. In 2006 an objection that the decision had been improperly taken succeeded. The 1988 position therefore stood in principle, although women already serving as deacons could remain in office. In 2009 the synod received a study report with two alternative recommendations, one to open all offices to women and the other to keep the offices of elder and minister closed to them because of the biblical command that women keep silent in the church. It decided by majority that women may not serve as elders or ministers. The same synod accepted its committee's view that the disagreement concerned the interpretation of particular texts, not the authority of Scripture, and that it was not a confessional matter. Women have continued to serve as deacons in some congregations, including several black congregations, some of which also have women elders.

Some congregations nonetheless called women as elders. Objections to the 2009 decision were postponed in 2012, referred onward in 2015, when the synod called the matter an essential issue with the potential to divide the church, and rejected at an extraordinary synod in 2016. Later synods reaffirmed the decision by simple majority rather than by consensus, and many formal objections followed. Before 2024 two classes placed congregations with women elders, Krugersdorp and Klerksdorp, outside the federation, steps that Vorster argued were procedurally unsound.

The General Synod of 5–10 January 2026 in Potchefstroom, attended by 280 delegates from the seven regional synods, required all congregations to conform by majority support. It declared that non-compliance with its decisions on women in office amounts to self-severance from the federation and called the churches concerned to repentance. Those with women elders were given one year, until January 2027, to reverse their decisions and release the women from office. Otherwise their classis would declare that they had separated themselves from the federation, with the regional synod and the General Synod to act if a classis did not. The decision did not change the position on women deacons. The church's spokesperson, Piet Venter, said that such congregations would have to reverse their decisions, leave, or be placed outside the federation, and he expected considerable tension and unrest.

The synod treated the matter as one of obedience to Scripture and to the binding decisions of the church, and Vorster described the GKSA as continuing a more literal reading of the relevant texts than other churches. Critics took a different view. Tanya van Wyk of the University of Pretoria, an NHK minister, said the decision pointed to a larger systemic and social problem. Within the GKSA, the minister Wim Vergeer asked in a newspaper column whether the church had become a "male cult", and the theologian Thinandavha Mashau argued that the decision could lead to schism. In July 2026 the church council of George published an open letter refusing to comply with the synod's enforcement decision. The letter did not deal directly with women elders. Instead it rejected the claim that non-complying congregations were guilty of disobedience, arguing that this placed synod decisions on the level of the Word of God, and it called the self-separation ruling ultra vires. Appealing to article 31 of the Church Order, the council said it would not treat the decision or its deadline as binding while it took the matter to Classis Boland, and that it remained a member of the GKSA "without reservation". Its minister Johannes de Bruyn said at least eight other congregations had responded in a similar way.

== Ecumenical relations ==
The GKSA helped found the Reformed Ecumenical Synod in 1946. It ended its correspondence with the Reformed Churches in the Netherlands in 1976, and in 1988 it suspended its membership of the Reformed Ecumenical Synod, objecting to the Dutch church's view of Scripture. In 1989 the Christian Reformed Church in North America suspended its own ties with the GKSA, which it later restored. Since 2000 the church has distinguished three levels of relationship with other churches: ecumenical contact, ecumenical ties and, closest of all, ecumenical unity, which it seeks with churches that are one with it in doctrine, worship and discipline.

As of 2026 the GKSA lists ecumenical unity with eighteen churches. Among them are the Christian Reformed Churches in the Netherlands, the Orthodox Presbyterian Church, the Presbyterian Church in America, the United Reformed Churches in North America, the Free Church of Scotland, the Free Church of Scotland (Continuing), the Reformed Churches of New Zealand, the Christian Reformed Churches of Australia, the Presbyterian Church of Australia, the Kosin Presbyterian Church, the Presbyterian Church of Brazil, the Reformed Church Botswana and the Sudanese Reformed Churches. It has ecumenical ties with six more churches, among them the International Presbyterian Church and the National Presbyterian Church in Mexico. It is a member of the International Conference of Reformed Churches and the World Reformed Fellowship, and an observer at the World Communion of Reformed Churches, the Association of Evangelicals in Africa and The Evangelical Alliance of South Africa.

The relationship with the URCNA was tested when the Reformed Church Southern Suburbs in Cape Town, which had begun in 2012 as a mission of the English GKSA congregation in Bellville, schismed from the GKSA. In March 2023 one of the URCNA's regional classes provisionally received the congregation, but in June 2024 the URCNA's synod declined to approve the reception. Delegates raised concerns about the distance and the precedent it would set, and some argued that receiving the congregation would be awkward given the URCNA's ecumenical relationship with the GKSA.

The 2026 synod reshaped several of these relationships. It downgraded its unity with the Reformed Church in Japan to ecumenical ties because that church had admitted women to the special offices. It ended unity with the Christian Reformed Church in North America "with sadness", keeping only ecumenical contact, because of that church's long-standing decision to ordain women as ministers and elders, though it noted with gratitude the CRCNA's recent decisions to uphold the traditional view on human sexuality. It likewise reduced its relationship with the Nederlandse Gereformeerde Kerken, formed by a merger that included its former Dutch sister church, the Reformed Churches in the Netherlands (Liberated), to ecumenical contact. Its deputies had concluded that the two churches were no longer one in doctrine, worship and discipline, citing the Dutch church's acceptance of women in office, a looser adherence to the confessions and its decision on same-sex relationships. At the same time the synod offered ecumenical unity to De Gereformeerde Kerken, a new Dutch federation formed in 2024 mainly by former members of the Liberated churches.

In South Africa the GKSA works with the NGK and the NHK in the Inter-Church Council (Tussenkerklike Raad). In 2026 it decided to remain in the council, although its deputies reported that growing differences between the three churches meant that the council's original aim of drawing them closer was no longer being realised. The synod suspended its Memorandum of Cooperation with the NGK, which had allowed ministers to preach in each other's pulpits, until talks established where the two churches stood. The GKSA's deputies cited serious differences with the NGK over hermeneutics, the doctrine of God, the view of Scripture, ecclesiology, sin and the Reformed confession, as well as divisions within the NGK itself, and the synod also mandated talks with the NGK's synod in Namibia and with the Koinonia Synod. The NGK moderator, Jan Lubbe, said he regretted the suspension. The church further approved a memorandum with the Free Reformed Churches of South Africa, a federation founded in the 1950s by Dutch immigrants from the Liberated churches, as a roadmap towards unity. In 2021 the Free Reformed Churches had named three obstacles to unity: the GKSA's memorandum with the NGK, its admission of women as deacons and its acceptance of the 2001 psalm versification. The GKSA's other domestic dialogue partners include the NHK, the Afrikaanse Protestantse Kerk and the Rhenish Church.

== Afrikaner nationalism and apartheid ==
Members of the GKSA played a substantial part in Afrikaner nationalism well beyond their numbers. After the Second Boer War, Dopper ministers and teachers were among the strongest supporters of the Dutch-medium Christian-National schools set up in opposition to Lord Milner's anglicisation policy. Although they made up only about a tenth of Afrikaners, Doppers formed a sizeable part of the following of J. B. M. Hertzog when he founded the National Party in 1914. From the late 1920s Potchefstroom academics, all members of the church, took over the leadership of the Afrikaner Broederbond, and the Potchefstroom professor J. C. van Rooy chaired it for much of the 1930s and 1940s. Hexham nonetheless concluded that the Doppers' direct influence on the party and its legislation "always remained small".

In 1944 Totius gave what the historian Hermann Giliomee calls "the first published theological defense of apartheid", arguing from the story of Babel that what God had separated should not be joined. Giliomee adds that NGK ministers and mission strategists had been "first in the field" with the idea. In 2015 the church asked for Totius's statue to be removed from the Potchefstroom campus because of this speech. The theologian John de Gruchy writes that after 1948 the GKSA, like the NGK and NHK, gave theological support to apartheid, "though with more reservation". Potchefstroom also produced some of apartheid's earliest Afrikaner critics. L. J. du Plessis came to regard Verwoerd's policy as un-Christian, and from 1960 the journal Woord en Daad gave a platform to Gereformeerde writers with serious doubts about separate development. Nobel Peace Prize recipient F. W. de Klerk, who as president began dismantling apartheid in 1990, was a member of the church, although he acted as a politician, not as a representative of the church.

Scholars disagree about how much the GKSA shaped Afrikaner nationalism. Irving Hexham argued that its neo-Calvinist "Christian-National" ideas were a main source of nationalist ideology, while André du Toit judged their role "distinctive but minor". Giliomee accepts that the Doppers' influence was "out of all proportion to their small numbers", but holds that neo-Calvinism "never won majority support" among nationalists.

== Membership ==
Membership of the GKSA
Year	Congregations	Members	Notes
1860	7	2,253	Within a year of founding
1862		1,079	Confessing members
1868	16	4,362	
1899	43	10,678	
1904	48	12,125	
1941		33,487	
1950	153	41,961	Confessing members
1990	300	78,946	Confessing members The congregation count matches that of the white Synod Potchefstroom alone. The three other national synods had about 83 more congregations.
2025	382	c. 70,000	
2026	296–371		The church's English site gives 371 churches and 225 ministers. Its Afrikaans directory lists 296.

In the early 1970s about 8 per cent of Afrikaners belonged to the GKSA, against about 7 per cent in the NHK and the large majority in the NGK. Like the other Afrikaans churches, it has been losing members since the 1990s. A study of 77 congregations found that they had lost 5,911 members between 2005 and 2015, while the church gained many black congregations over the same decade. The church's administrative bureau reported to the 2026 synod that the number of confessing members was falling by about 3 per cent a year and that congregations were ageing. It also noted that some congregations under-report their membership, because the contributions each congregation pays to the federation are calculated per member.

== Notable members ==
H. G. Stoker, prominent GKSA philosopher in the neo-Calvinist stream

- Dirk Postma (1818–1890), the church's first minister and founder of its theological school
- Paul Kruger (1825–1904), founding member and president of the South African Republic
- Jan Lion Cachet (1838–1912), theologian, writer and first full-time professor at the theological school
- Willem Postma (1874–1920), minister and writer, a leading Dopper in the Christian-National education movement
- Totius (J. D. du Toit, 1877–1953), poet, professor of theology and translator of the Afrikaans Bible
- Ferdinand Postma (1879–1950), rector of Potchefstroom University College
- L. J. du Plessis (1897–1968), political scientist at Potchefstroom and an early critic of Verwoerd's apartheid policy
- H. G. Stoker (1899–1993), philosopher at Potchefstroom
- J. C. van Rooy, Potchefstroom academic and chairman of the Afrikaner Broederbond
- Jan de Klerk (1903–1979), cabinet minister and senator
- Frans Rumpff (1912–1992), judge who presided over the acquittal in the Treason Trial and later Chief Justice
- Willem de Klerk (1928–2018), minister, academic and newspaper editor
- F. W. de Klerk (1936–2021), Nobel Peace Prize recipient and State President who negotiated the end of apartheid
- Theuns Eloff (born 1955), minister and later vice-chancellor of North-West University
- Flip Buys (born 1963), Executive Chairman of the Solidarity Movement
- Kallie Kriel (born 1969), CEO of the civil rights group AfriForum
- Dirk Hermann (born 1972), Chief Executive of the Solidarity Movement

== See also ==
- Afrikaner Calvinism
- Christian nationalism in South Africa
- Dirk Postma
- Totius
- Potchefstroom Campus
- Free Reformed Churches of South Africa
