= Lodewicus du Plessis =

South African minister (1897–1968)

Chairman of the Afrikaner Broederbond
- In office 1930–1932
- Preceded by: Potgieter, J.W.
- Succeeded by: Van Rooy, J.C.

Personal details
- Born: Lodewicus Johannes du Plessis; February 10, 1897 Burgersdorp, Cape Colony
- Died: February 19, 1968 (aged 71) Potchefstroom, Transvaal, South Africa
- Spouse: Engela Susanna van der Merwe
- Education: University of Pretoria
- Known for: South African Academic and Alternative Afrikaner Political Philosopher and Calvinist.

Lodewicus Johannes du Plessis (1897–1968) was a South African academic, alternative Afrikaner political philosopher, and Calvinist.

== Roots ==
He was born on 10 February 1897, in Burgersdorp, Cape Colony. He was the son of Jacobus Albertus du Plessis and Laurika Postma. He married Engela Susanna van der Merwe on 12 January 1926. He died on 19 February 1968, in Potchefstroom, Transvaal, South Africa.

== Education ==
Du Plessis matriculated in 1912, from Potchefstroom Gimnasium. He received his BA, BA Hons (Classical languages) and MA (Classical languages) at the University of Pretoria. Later, he also received a master's degree in economics, as well as an LL.B. (law degree).

== Career ==
In 1918, he started as a senior lecturer in Classical languages at The Theological Seminar of the Reformed Church (Afrikaans: Gereformeerde Kerke in Suid-Afrika) in Potchefstroom. After obtaining the economics and law qualifications, he was offered a professorship in economics, political science and ethics at the Potchefstroom University for Christian Higher Education. In later years he focused on law. He was secretary to the commission who translated the Bible in Afrikaans and was an advisor to Totius.

== Calvinism ==
He was an alternative Calvinist, in the sense that he believed that Calvinism is not the only answer. He was open to a combination of Calvinism, Marxism, and other possible beliefs.

== Politics ==
He was actively participating in Afrikaner politics, although he never stood for office. He was chairman of the Afrikaner Broederbond from 1930 to 1932. He was not scared to differ from political leaders such as J.B.M. Hertzog, DF Malan, and J. G. Strijdom. His biggest clash was with H.F. Verwoerd, which caused him to be expelled from the National Party. Then, he also left the Afrikaner Broederbond. He was not in favour of Verwoerd's racial policy and his definition of an Afrikaner.
