= Dirk Postma =

South African minister (GKSA) (1818–1890)

Professor Dirk Postma
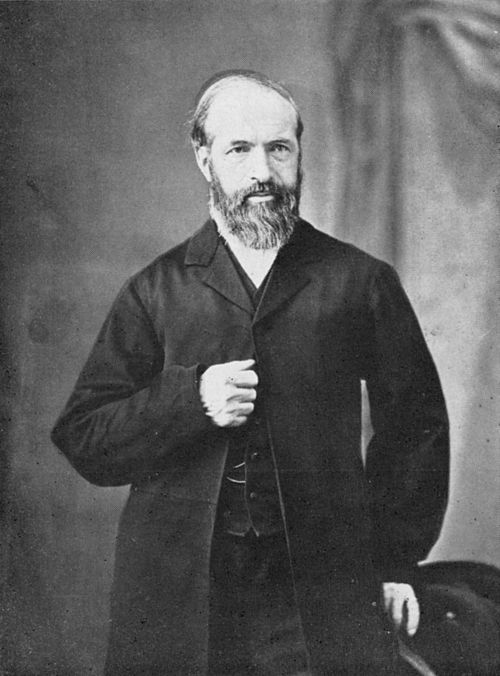

Rector of the Theological School of the RCSA
- In office November 29, 1869 – December 28, 1890
- Succeeded by: Martinus Postma

Personal life
- Born: January 10, 1818 Dokkum, Friesland
- Died: December 28, 1890 (aged 72) Burgersdorp, Cape Colony
- Resting place: Burgersdorp
- Spouse: Marijke Bankes de Ruijter (m. 1840; died 1843); Janna Willemina Alberts Free (m. 1844; died 1849); Ida Sijpkens (m. 1850; died 1857); Susanna Lasea Kruger (m. 1859; died 1869); Johanna Willemina van Biljon (m. 1869)
- Children: 20
- Parents: Pieter Pieters Postma (father); Lolkje Arjens Boekhout (mother)
- Era: Victorian

Religious life
- Religion: Christianity
- Denomination: Reformed; Dutch Reformed
- Church: Christelijke Afgescheidene Gereformeerde Kerk, (1840-1858); Reformed Churches in South Africa, (1859-1890)
- Profession: Dutch Reformed Minister
- Ordination: July 5, 1840

Senior posting
- Teacher: T.F De Haan
- Students: N.J.R. Swart; Stephanus Postma; Martinus Postma; Petrus Postma; Willem Postma (Dr. O'kulis)

Dirk Postma (Dokkum, Friesland, the Netherlands, 10 January 1818 – Burgersdorp, 28 December 1890) was the first minister in the Reformed Church in South Africa and the founder and first professor of the Church’s theological school in Burgersdorp, in the Eastern Cape, the forerunner of the Theological School and University in Potchefstroom.

His biographer, Dr. G.C.P. Van der Vyver, wrote in 1958 in the only comprehensive biography published (as of 2025) on Postma, that he “was a deeply devout, sincerely pious man who recognized 'God's Providence' in all things and therefore continually wrestled in prayer for God’s counsel and guidance. Strongly warmhearted by nature, he walked and communed with the Lord as a Friend and Counselor. And it is precisely this faith and relationship with God that gave a steadfastness to his character which left a deep impression on his contemporaries.”

Postma is the South African patriarch of the remarkable Postma family, which has contributed in many areas and continues to do so today. He was married five times, three times in the Netherlands and twice in South Africa, and outlived all his wives except the last. From these marriages, 20 children were born, of whom five did not reach adulthood. Among the children who gained prominence were, Petrus Postma, a Reformed minister in Pretoria, and chaplain to Paul Kruger; Martinus, the first Reformed minister on the Witwatersrand; Dirk Jr., a Reformed minister, writer and church historian; Stephanus, a Reformed minister and theologian; and Willem, a Reformed minister also known by his pen name Dr. O'kulis.

Postma is one of only three ministers in the Afrikaner churches to have had five sons who also became ministers. The other two, both belonging to the Dutch Reformed Church (NGK), are Andrew Murray and Jan Hendrik Hofmeyr.

== Early life ==
Postma was the youngest child of Pieter Pieters Postma and Lolkje Arjens Boekhout. Although he was baptized as Durk, he abandoned this Frisian spelling in the Netherlands in favor of the Dutch spelling, Dirk. His parents were simple laborers who lived in poor circumstances. He lost his father at the age of five, leaving his mother to care for four children. The eldest, Pieter, was 17, Arjen 13, Tyttje nine, and Durk just five.

Life was hard and simple, so Postma left school at 15 to work as a blikslagersknecht (assistant to a plumber) to support his mother.

Together with his mother, he aligned himself with the church Afscheiding (Secession) of members from the Hervormde Kerk in 1834 in the Netherlands, through which the seceders returned in doctrine, worship, and discipline to the confessions, liturgy, and church governance established by the Synod of Dordrecht of 1618–19. The father of this movement was Hendrik de Cock, whose great-granddaughter Anna Böeseken later became a well-known historian in South Africa. Through Postma’s efforts, De Cock’s son, Helenius de Cock, a friend of Postma, was called to South Africa three times, but each time he declined the call. On 12 May 1838, Postma made a public profession of faith in the Afgescheidene Christelijk-Gereformeerde congregation of Wanswerd, and through this connection with the 1834 Secession, he aligned himself with the Reformed-conservative segment of the Dutch population.

== Ministry in the Netherlands ==
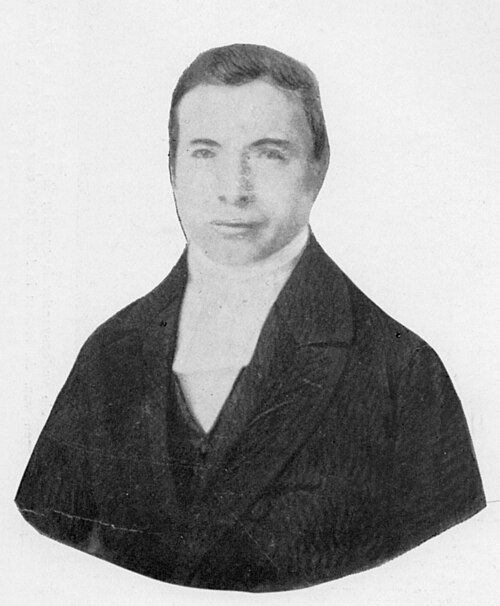
Postma as a young pastor in the Netherlands

He felt a strong calling to become a minister in his church and, due to the absence of a theological seminary during the early years of the denomination, received approximately one year of private theological training under T.F. de Haan, who instilled in him a particular love for the classical languages. Postma was ordained on 5 July 1840, without formal theological education, as minister of the Word in his first congregation, Minnertsga. He subsequently served the congregations of Middelstum-Bedum (1842–1844), Wildervank (1844–1849), and Zwolle (1849–1858).

In the Netherlands, he played a significant role in the establishment and development of church life. As a young man, he distinguished himself as a capable leader and earned the trust of his peers. He was especially active in promoting Christian education, mediating between conflicting factions within the Christelijke Afgescheidene Gereformeerde Kerk (Christian Secession Reformed Church), and advocating for the establishment of a dedicated theological seminary, which was eventually founded in Kampen in 1854.

== In South Africa ==
In 1858, there was a significant shortage of ministers in the state church of the South African Republic, the Nederduitsch Hervormde Kerk, which since 1852 had only one permanent minister, Dirk van der Hoff. In 1857, church elder Van Andel of 's-Hertogenbosch brought this situation to the attention of the synod of the Christelijke Afgescheidene Gereformeerde Kerk in Leiden. In response, the synod commissioned Postma to travel to South Africa to assist the Transvaal church and to explore opportunities for missionary work. His official letter of appointment, however, gave him a broader mandate, instructing him to investigate the religious condition of the related people and fellow believers in the South African Republic, to establish fraternal relations with them, and to act in all things as he deemed most beneficial for the advancement of the Kingdom of God.

Postma departed from the Netherlands on 22 May 1858 and arrived in Simon’s Town on 9 July. After a brief stay in Cape Town, he continued to Durban, as his intended destination was the Transvaal. A report of his arrival was sent to the authorities in the Transvaal. For an unclear reason, the message was forwarded to the church council of Rustenburg, where a group of members who had long opposed the use of evangelical hymns and doctrinal errors in the existing South African churches offered to sponsor Postma and fetch him from Durban. The Transvaal government granted them permission to retain him as their minister, provided their arrangement did not conflict with the relevant articles of the Transvaal constitution.

=== Founding of the Reformed Churches in South Africa ===
On 5 November 1858, at six o'clock in the morning, Postma crossed the Vaal River near Standerton in the company of Flip Snyman from Rustenburg and Douw Kruger, the brother of the future president Paul Kruger, who had fetched him from Natal and accompanied him to the South African Republic. A few days earlier, Kruger had ridden ahead on horseback to inform the people of Postma’s arrival. As soon as the Dutch minister set foot on Transvaal soil, he was asked to preach. At the home of a certain D. Leus, a number of people had gathered, and there Postma held his first service in the country to which his church had delegated him.

Later that same morning, the group continued their journey in the hope of reaching Potchefstroom by Saturday evening, but by that evening they had only reached the farm Buffeldoorns, owned by Flip Schutte. The next day, Sunday, two services were held at this location. On Monday, 8 November, Postma and his companions continued on to Rustenburg, accompanied by Schutte, after learning on Sunday afternoon that both Dirk van der Hoff and president M. W. Pretorius were absent from Potchefstroom. On 10 November, Postma arrived in Rustenburg and took up residence in a room at Van der Hoff’s parsonage.

Upon his arrival in the Transvaal, Postma became acquainted with the so-called Doppers, who already formed a group with a distinct identity in South African ecclesiastical and religious life. Postma offered his assistance to the Transvaal Church, but the general assembly of the Nederduitsch Hervormde Kerk decided on 11 January 1859 to make the use of evangelical hymns compulsory. Postma regarded this as a coercion of his conscience and therefore found it unacceptable. Fifteen individuals, among them the future president Paul Kruger, officially separated from the state church and requested that Postma assist them as minister so they could continue as a free Reformed Church. This led to the founding of the Reformed Church in South Africa at Rustenburg on 11 February 1859. In this secession, as Postma saw it, the Reformed Church had returned from a state of “deeply sunken liberalism” to the true Reformed position.

Postma’s role in the founding of the Reformed Church has been interpreted in various ways in South African church historiography. The Dutch Reformed historian G.B.A. Gerdener wrote in Geskiedenis van die Ned. Geref. Kerke in Natal, Vrystaat en Transvaal (1934) that, after disembarking in Simon’s Town on 9 July 1858, Postma was “warmly received in the Western Province, frequently spoke in Dutch Reformed churches, made use of the hymns, and expressed himself favourably about men such as A. Faure, N.J. Hofmeyr, and F.L. Cachet.” According to Gerdener, Hofmeyr had the impression that Postma’s coming resulted “from a revived zeal among the Secessionists to promote the cause of Gospel proclamation among the heathen as the Church of Christ.” Gerdener concluded that this missionary aim was only a secondary goal in what was primarily an endeavour focused on work “among kindred and fellow believers,” though the secondary goal soon faded away almost entirely.

Dr. S. du Toit, at the time a professor at the Reformed Church’s Theological School at the Potchefstroom University for Christian Higher Education, wrote in Handleiding vir die studie van kerkgeskiedenis (1955) that Postma’s first impressions of the Cape Church were “generally favourable.” According to Du Toit, Postma could detect “no impurity in the preaching” and found the strongest agreement. Du Toit noted that Postma allowed a hymn to be sung only once. “This action was later held strongly against him. He was accused of dishonesty and hypocrisy, being satisfied with the church in Cape Town, even allowing hymns to be sung, and later facilitating a secession from that same church on the very point of hymn-singing.” Du Toit maintained that Postma acted “on first impressions.” In his diary, Postma wrote: “As far as I can see at present, I expect much good from this church.” And further: “If the church here, in the freedom it now enjoys, continues as it has, I cherish the thought that in time they will remove those hymns which are not found to be in a good spirit; for I have made my opinion known to the foremost among them and we are in complete agreement.”

Du Toit explained that Postma’s conduct was consistent with his policy, which he would later clarify in the Transvaal: “If a church uses hymns, and there is peace in the congregation and the hymns are doctrinally sound, then I may not condemn the church for it nor cause trouble about it, as I demonstrated during my journey.” According to Du Toit, Postma did not wish to cause any untimely agitation. In the Transvaal, the question of hymn usage had already been a point of contention for several years. There, Postma refrained entirely from allowing hymns from the beginning.

Dr. B. Spoelstra also wrote in Beknopte kerkgeskiedenis vir katkisasie (1973) that the Christian Reformed Church in the Netherlands had informed the Cape ministers of Postma’s arrival. They were immediately concerned that a church split might arise in the interior, as they were aware of the Doppers’ opposition. They did everything in their power to persuade Postma that the Cape Church was very sound in its Reformed doctrine, apart from the hymns. According to Spoelstra, a comment from a liberal Cape newspaper indicated that Postma was already associated with the Doppers, clearly showing that there was already a divide in church matters even before a Reformed minister had set foot in the country. Nevertheless, malicious individuals have sometimes claimed that Postma transplanted the Dutch Secession into South Africa. Such individuals fail to see the work of the Lord in the hearts of ordinary people, even though they had no minister. Because they read the Word of the Lord and the books of the old Reformed authors, such as Smytegeld, Á Brakel, Mel, and others, the Holy Spirit kept the true faith alive in the hearts of these simple believers.

Some writers viewed him as a deliberate schismatic who was unfaithful to the purpose of his mission, even though he initially discouraged secession. Dr. S. P. Engelbrecht wrote in Geskiedenis van die Nederduitsch Hervormde Kerk van Afrika (third revised and expanded edition, 1953) that Postma did not cause the secession but rather organized it. According to his own testimony, Postma did not conceive, seek, or desire the Reformed Church in South Africa, but even resisted its formation by the advice he gave under the circumstances. As the first minister of the Reformed Church in South Africa, Postma bore great responsibilities, but some people initially slandered and defamed his good name and character. Even some of his ecclesiastical and religious opponents repudiated the accusations.

=== First Transvaal Minister ===
He settled in Rustenburg and, with great dedication, served congregations in the Transvaal, the Orange Free State, and the Cape Colony. Dr. Engelbrecht wrote that Postma and Van der Hoff of the Hervormde Kerk were always courteous and brotherly toward one another, even after the schism, which took place in a fraternal manner without hatred or conflict. He noted that after the Reformed Church had been established in South Africa, the Hervormde and Reformed Churches generally followed the dignified example set by Postma and Van der Hoff and did not quarrel with each other, despite their differences. The disputes, he explained, were between the Dutch Reformed Church on the one hand and the Nederduitsch Hervormde and Reformed Churches on the other.

In the Transvaal, Postma worked toward the disentanglement of the state church, the Nederduitsch Hervormde Kerk, from state privilege and state funding. With regard to his own church, he opposed the state's disregard. The Reformed believers were required by taxation to contribute to the maintenance of the state church from the public treasury. Marriage banns could only be proclaimed in the state church, and all marriage fees were paid into the state church's treasury. Only members of the state church were granted voting rights.

Even before the founding of the Reformed Church's Theological School in Burgersdorp, Postma trained several ministers, including Jan Lion Cachet and N.J.R. Swart, the latter of whom later became state secretary of the South African Republic.

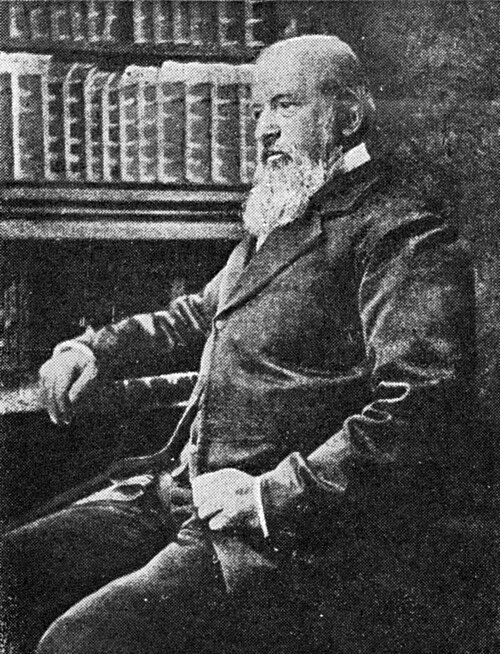
Postma in his study at Burgersdorp in 1880

=== At Burgersdorp ===
In 1866, Postma accepted a call to the congregation of Burgersdorp in the northern part of what is today the Eastern Cape. This congregation had been established on 21 January 1860 in a warehouse of a shop, as no suitable hall could be found for the founding of a congregation due to the opposition the Doppers faced. According to Ons Kerk Album of 1917, the congregation was founded on the farm Roosterkoek in the district of Albert, with Burgersdorp as its centre. It was the first Reformed congregation in the Cape Colony. At the time, pamphlets were also written against the Reformed believers. In the district of Colesberg, the opposition was so fierce that the Doppers established their own town, Philipstown. From its founding until the arrival of Postma, Burgersdorp had remained without a minister due to the shortage of ministers in the Reformed Church.

Postma was called there specifically with the aim of giving attention to the training of ministers. Burgersdorp was considered more suitable for theological training because of the more stable and settled political conditions in the Cape Colony at the time. There was interest from other congregations in the immediate area, and the members of the Burgersdorp congregation and neighbouring congregations were more affluent and established than those in the North, making them better able to contribute financially to the establishment of such a school. In 1860, only a year after the founding of the church, three congregations were established in the northern Cape Colony: Burgersdorp, Colesberg, and Middelburg. These were followed by Philipstown in 1863, Bethulie in 1863 in the southern Free State, and Aliwal North in 1864. By the end of 1875, four more followed: Dordrecht, Barkly East, Steynsburg, and Venterstad.

=== Establishing the RCSA Seminary ===
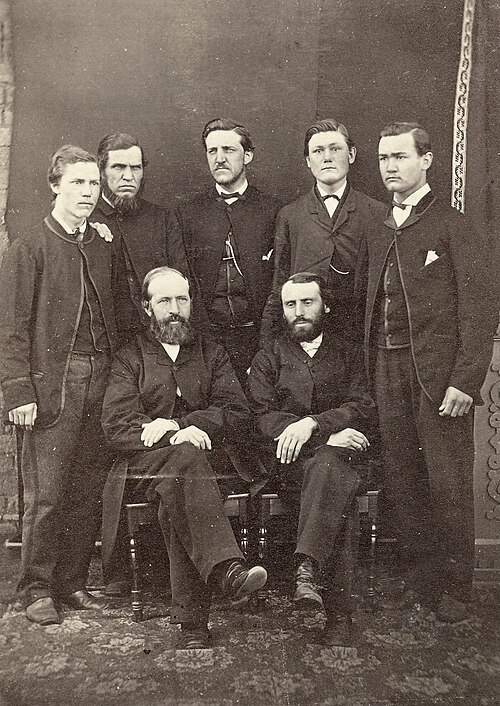
Postma and J.L. Cachet with the first five seminarians, M. Pelser, S.Venter, L.J. du Plessis, M.P.A Cotsee Jr., and W.J. Snyman.

Postma, with the energetic support of the congregation in Burgersdorp, committed himself to the establishment of a seminary. According to S. du Toit, the need for a dedicated institution for the training of ministers had already been emphasised at the first Reformed synod in 1862. At that synod, Postma presented a historical overview, and several church councils expressed their strong desire for a school of their own. The matter was postponed to the next synod, and in the meantime a collection was approved. At the synod of 1863, held in Rustenburg, Postma submitted a written proposal in which he strongly urged that the church make provision for formal ministerial training. The synod once again did not proceed with the establishment of a theological school but decided that ministers should temporarily handle the instruction and that examinations would be conducted before a synod. Postma and Johannes Beyer, minister of Reddersburg from 1862 to 1866, immediately began the work, and by the synod of 1866 in Reddersburg, two candidates were already admitted to the ministry, N. J. R. Swart and S. D. Venter.

Before the synod of 1869, held in Potchefstroom, Postma launched a vigorous campaign in the Cape Province to establish the theological school in Burgersdorp. Over £1,000 was raised in the form of interest-free shares before the synod met. At the synod, the congregation of Burgersdorp proposed that the existing arrangement, set up under the leadership of the church council, simply be expanded through the calling of a second minister for Burgersdorp, on the condition that other congregations contribute to his salary. The synod accepted the proposal, and Postma was appointed as the first lecturer of the newly established theological school. Jan Lion Cachet, who had been elected as the second minister of Burgersdorp, also served as the second lecturer. The school was officially opened on 29 November 1869 in the outbuildings of the parsonage, and the first five students were enrolled: L. J. du Plessis, J. S. L. Venter, M. P. A. Coetsee Jr., M. Pelser, and W. J. Snyman. This was just a decade after the Dutch Reformed Church, which had been active in South Africa for over two centuries, had founded its theological seminary in Stellenbosch.

Postma and Cachet both served as part-time lecturers during the first seven years of the school’s existence, since both were full-time ministers in the Burgersdorp congregation. When the synod decided in 1876 to appoint a full-time professor, Postma was selected. He considered himself unqualified and declined the position, but acted as interim professor and only in 1879 accepted the appointment as full-time professor. Only then did his formal connection to the Burgersdorp congregation come to an end.

G. P. C. van der Vyver wrote in the South African Biographical Dictionary that, although Postma had received little formal schooling or theological education, his high intellectual capacity and diligent self-study over the years enabled him to fulfil his professorial duties with honour. In his teaching he displayed a particular love for the classical languages, a preference he passed on to his descendants. As professor he had to cover the entire field of theological science. He was never able to specialise in any particular area, and his knowledge and understanding of some subjects, such as church polity, could even be considered weak. Throughout his tenure, he also served the school ably as rector. Van der Vyver wrote in My erfenis is vir my mooi, the commemorative book of the Reformed Church’s theological school, that Postma was a passionate advocate for Christian education and the cultivation of Christian scholarship. Hence his dedication to establishing Christian schools, the founding of the theological school in 1869, and the further development of the institution so that it could increasingly serve both church and nation. He consistently advocated for the status of Dutch alongside English and for thorough instruction in national history. Van der Vyver stated that Postma’s words before the 1873 synod reflected his vision for Christian education, when he envisioned an institution with a normal school where teachers could be trained, an institution capable of awarding university degrees for those who wished to continue to doctorates or law studies, and a complete academic path for those aspiring to become ministers. It was indeed Postma, the far-sighted idealist, who looked ahead to the creation of an institution for higher education, what would ultimately become the Potchefstroom University for Christian Higher Education, and who laid its first foundations and began to build upon them.

== Personal life ==
Postma was married five times and had twenty children from these marriages, some of whom died in infancy. His first wife, whom he married on 17 July 1840 at the age of 22, was Marijke Bankes de Ruijter. She died on 13 July 1843. On 23 May 1844, he married Janna Willemina Alberts Free, who died on 28 January 1849. His third marriage also took place in the Netherlands, on 11 February 1850, to Ida Sijpkens, who died on 30 March 1857. Among the children from this marriage were Zwaantje Postma, who married Jan Lion Cachet, as well as Petrus Postma and Martinus Postma.

Postma’s first marriage in South Africa took place on 24 November 1859, in the same year the Reformed Church was founded, to Susanna Lasea Kruger. She died on 3 October 1869. This was the longest of his first four marriages. From this union were born, among others, Dirk Postma Jr. and Stephanus Postma.

His fifth and final marriage, at the age of 51, was on 20 December 1869 to Johanna Willemina van Biljon. She survived him by eleven years and died on 12 July 1901 after a painful illness, often interpreted at the time as cancer. Among the six children from this marriage were Willem Postma, Laurika Postma, and Aletta Postma. Aletta and Laurika were respectively the first and second wives of Professor J. A. du Plessis of Potchefstroom. Another daughter, Maria, married J. D. du Toit, also known as Totius.

=== Personality ===
Van der Vyver wrote in the Biographical Dictionary that Postma’s entire existence revolved around his unwavering faith. As a deeply devout person with a warm and kind-hearted nature, he lived in close communion with God. He strongly emphasised doctrinal purity in both personal and ecclesiastical life, but never separated it from daily living. His humility was well known to his contemporaries, and he treated others with respect and courtesy. Through this, even as a controversial figure in the church politics of his time, he earned the esteem of both friend and foe.

Spoelstra wrote that Postma was adorned with admirable qualities. He was honest, sincere, tactful, and composed. He was a worthy servant of the Lord. His sense of calling and his willingness to sacrifice in service seemed almost limitless.

On the occasion of his fortieth year in ministry, Postma expressed his life philosophy as follows: “Commit your way to the Lord and trust in Him, and He will do it.” He experienced a strong sense of calling and regarded his life’s work as something entrusted to him by the Lord. This awareness of vocation, combined with a steadfast will and exceptional capacity for work, fueled his dedication. Although he lacked extensive formal education, he was gifted with a sharp intellect, sound judgment, and strong organisational skills, which explain how he accomplished so much in his lifetime. He was a man of discipline and order. Even when at the center of ecclesiastical conflict in both the Netherlands and South Africa, he remained tolerant toward others. Some of his fiercest opponents in church affairs testified that he was not quarrelsome, but rather maintained a spirit of goodwill toward others while holding firmly to his convictions. One contemporary, D. P. M. Huet of the Dutch Reformed Church in Natal, once described him as a man deserving of the respect and affection of all godly people, a dignified minister of the Gospel, and someone whose presence in a congregation would be considered a great blessing. He was a man in whose behavior the mind of Christ was evident.

Postma did, however, make mistakes in his life, such as his harsh treatment of N. J. R. Swart after the latter accepted the appointment as state secretary of the South African Republic.

Although his greatest and most enduring contribution was the founding, establishment, and expansion of the Reformed Church in South Africa, he also played a broader role in strengthening the Calvinist worldview in South Africa amid the liberal tide of the nineteenth century.

=== As a teacher ===
Postma was a strong advocate for Christian education. At a time when liberalism swept through South Africa and its educational systems like a flood, he warned against its influence. Having experienced the struggle for Christian education in the Netherlands, he viewed neutral or secular schooling as a poisoning of the child’s mind. For this reason, he dedicated himself to the establishment of free Christian schools, with the voluntary principle as one of their cornerstones. Postma emphasised that it was the responsibility of the parents to educate the child, not the state.

He considered the teaching of national history and the Dutch language to be of the utmost importance. He worked especially hard to have Dutch recognised as a school subject and to secure its equal status with English in public life. When Dutch was officially recognised as a language of debate in the Cape Parliament in 1882, Postma was one of the speakers at a celebratory event held in Burgersdorp.

=== As a writer ===
Multiple short articles by Postma appeared during his lifetime in church and public journals, but only two significant publications are known. Mijne handleiding voor de godgeleerdheid volgens de kerk van Aegidius Francken was published in Cape Town in 1875, as well as another work in the same year in the Mother City titled Geprovoceerde herinneringen en teregtwijzing aan den wel. eerw. zeergel. heer S. Hofmeyr Th. Dr. Three years after his death, in 1893, his son Dirk Postma Jr. published a collection of sermons by his father under the title Leerredenen.

== Descendants ==
Many of Postma’s descendants played a significant role in South Africa’s religious and cultural life. Jan Lion Cachet, J.A. du Plessis, and J.D. du Toit, his sons-in-law, were all professors at the Theological School of the Reformed Churches in South Africa. His eldest son from his third marriage, Petrus Postma, served as chaplain to President Paul Kruger and was successively a minister in Pretoria, Lichtenburg, and Heidelberg, Transvaal. The second son from that marriage, Martinus Postma, was also a professor at Burgersdorp and from 1889 until his death in 1926 served as minister of the Reformed congregations in Middelburg, Johannesburg, Pretoria, and again Johannesburg. Dirk Postma Jr., from 1884 onward, served the Reformed congregations of Fauresmith, Humpata, Fauresmith-Petrusburg, Steynsburg, and Rustenburg. He was also the author of Geschiedenis der Gereformeerde Kerk (1905). Another son from the fourth marriage (to Susanna Kruger), Stephanus Postma, became a professor at Burgersdorp and later served as minister in Middelburg. Two of his daughters, Hendrika (known as Rikie Postma) and the teacher Hilda, became writers of stories and poems, especially for children.

The town of Postmasburg was named after Postma, as well as the Dirk Postma Retirement Home in Burgersdorp and the Dirk Postma Reformed Combined School in Pretoria. A definitive biography, Professor Dirk Postma 1818–1890, was published in 1958 by Dr. G.C.P. van der Vyver, who also authored the entries on Postma in both the Standard Encyclopaedia of Southern Africa and the South African Biographical Dictionary.

== Family ==
Family of Dirk Postma
| Wife | Marriage Date | Death Date | Children (Name and Lifespan) |
|---|---|---|---|
| Marijke Bankes de Ruijter | 17 July 1840 | 13 July 1843 | Grietjie (26 July 1841 – 3 December 1843); Laurika (27 June 1843) |
| Janna Willemina Alberts Free | 23 May 1844 | 28 January 1849 | Pieter (2 March 1846 – 21 November 1850); Geertruida (5 December 1847 – 8 August 1866) |
| Ida Sijpkens | 11 February 1850 | 30 March 1857 | Laurika Postma; Petrus (22 July 1851 – 15 August 1851); Zwaantje Postma (15 June 1852 – 22 July 1875); Petrus Postma (21 January 1854 – 4 October 1919); Martinus Postma (14 July 1855 – 26 July 1926) |
| Susanna Lasea Kruger | 24 November 1859 | 3 October 1869 | Dirk Postma Jr. (1 June 1861 – 7 September 1919); Johanna (28 November 1862 – 19 December 1930); Stephanus Postma (6 January 1865 – 8 February 1904); Adrianus (16 September 1866 – 13 April 1933); Martha (13 April 1868 – 15 December 1945); Helenius (23 September 1869 – 2 November 1870) |
| Johanna Wilhelmina van Biljon | 20 December 1869 | 12 July 1901 | Brechtje (26 March 1871 – 20 March 1937); Helenius (11 May 1872 – 25 May 1874); Willem Postma (15 March 1874 – 13 December 1920); Laurika Postma (17 June 1875 – 4 March 1905); Aletta Postma (9 November 1876 – 6 November 1957); Maria (24 June 1881 – 3 August 1966) |

== Sources ==
- De Kock, W.J., ed. (1968). South African Biographical Dictionary, Volume I (in Afrikaans). Cape Town: Nasionale Boekhandel Beperk.
- Du Toit, S. du Toit (1955). Manual for the Study of Church History (in Afrikaans). Potchefstroom: Pro Rege Press.
- Engelbrecht, S.P. (1953). History of the Nederduitsch Hervormde Church of Africa (in Afrikaans). Cape Town and Pretoria: H.A.U.M.-J.H. de Bussy.
- Gerdener, G.B.A. (1934). Our Church in the Transgariep: History of the Dutch Reformed Church in Natal, Free State and Transvaal (in Afrikaans). Cape Town: Nasionale Pers.
- Maeder, G.A.; Zinn, Christian (1917). Our Church Album (in Dutch). Cape Town: Ons Kerk Album Maatschappij Ltd.
- Nienaber, P.J. (1949). Here Are Our Writers! Biographical Sketches of Afrikaans Authors (in Afrikaans). Johannesburg: Afrikaanse Pers-Boekhandel.
- Potgieter, D.J., ed. (1973). Standard Encyclopaedia of Southern Africa. Cape Town: Nasionale Opvoedkundige Uitgewery Ltd.
- Spoelstra, B. (1973). Concise Church History for Catechism Instruction (in Afrikaans). Potchefstroom: Pro Rege.
- Van der Vyver, G.C.P. (1969). My Heritage Is Precious to Me (in Afrikaans). Potchefstroom: Calvin Jubilee Book Fund.
- Van der Vyver, G.C.P. (1958). Professor Dirk Postma 1818–1890 (in Afrikaans). Potchefstroom: Pro Rege Press.
- Vogel, Willem (2011). Almanac of the Reformed Churches in South Africa for the Year 2012 (in Afrikaans). Potchefstroom: Administrative Bureau.
