= Johannes du Plessis =

South African theologian (1868–1935)

Johannes du Plessis (1868–1935) was a South African theologian and Protestant missionary. Du Plessis is perhaps most remembered for helping lead an interracial coalition to push for reforms to empower black South Africans and lessen government discrimination in the early 1920s, such as by limiting the pass laws. He was ordained by the Dutch Reformed Church of South Africa, although relations between him and the DRC declined in his later life over his liberal and modernist theological views, culminating in an accusation of heresy and his dismissal as professor at the University of Stellenbosch.

Du Plessis helped found the South African Institute of Race Relations, a liberal research organization, in 1929.

== Biography ==
Johannes du Plessis attended seminary in the University of Stellenbosch in South Africa and later the University of Edinburgh in Scotland, graduating with a doctorate in theology. In 1894, du Plessis was ordained a minister in the Dutch Reformed Church (DRC); he would become general secretary for Mission in 1903. He traveled working as a missionary across sub-Saharan Africa as part of his duties. In 1913, he was appointed professor of Christian mission (and later, of New Testament) at the University of Stellenbosch.

Du Plessis urged white South Africans to govern blacks in a "Christian manner." He defended the DRC as a non-racist church, but conceded that it had fallen short of its mission. He helped align both paternalist whites who wanted something short of total white dominion, educated blacks, and international missionaries to attempt to reform the pass laws, establish the right of black workers to strike, and to allow tradesmen to compete against white workers fairly and openly. Like many of the period, du Plessis still accepted some of the tenets of the era, such as disapproving of mixed-race marriages; he believed that blacks should be treated fairly, but not necessarily to the degree of accepting "miscegenation".

This social justice work did not particularly aggravate the DRC of the 1920s. However, du Plessis's work with international Christian missionaries had given him an ecumenical bent, and he did not believe certain passages of the Bible should be taken "literally", particularly creation according to Genesis and the Old Testament. Du Plessis instead favored evolution, a controversial belief at the time. Du Plessis was accused of heresy, and dismissed from his position as professor of theology at Stellenbosch in 1930.

The heresy charges were disputed in the Cape Town Supreme Court and much to the consternation of the church, the court agreed that the biblical chapter of Genesis is not literally true. He thereafter filed for wrongful dismissal and won again. He was reluctantly re-instated as professor at the seminary, but put on permanent administrative leave, to prevent him from teaching and distressing the seminarians with his scientific views.

These heresy charges distracted the minister from his other work, and what would later become apartheid began to set in South Africa's government in the 1930s, which would reverse many of his earlier successes. Johannes Du Plessis died in 1935.

After his death, a life sized statue of Johannes was erected in the town of Stellenbosch and positioned a hundred meters down the road facing the seminary gate. The granite statue oxidized turning it pink and the statue became known as 'Pink Pete'. Over the years, his statue was repeatedly vandalized with paint, but being made of extremely hard rock, it survived intact. The seminary eventually buried the hatchet and his statue was moved to the seminary grounds fifty years later, in an event attended by his daughter.

== Works ==
- A thousand miles in the heart of Africa; a record of a visit to the mission-field of the Boer Church in Central Africa. Oliphant Anderson & Ferrier, Edinburgh 1905
- A history of Christian missions in South Africa. Longmans, Green and Co., London, New York [etc.] 1911
- Thrice through the dark continent. a record of journeyings across Africa during the years 1913-1916. Longmans, Green and Co., London 1917
- Een toer door Afrika. (in Afrikaans) S.A. Association for the Advancement of Science, Kapstadt 1917
- The Life of Andrew Murray of South Africa. Marshall, London 1919
- The Evangelisation of Pagan Africa: A History of Christian Missions to the Pagan Tribes of Central Africa. J. C. Juta, Kapstadt und Johannesburg 1930
- Die Kerksaak tussen Prof. J. du Plessis en die Ned. Geref. Kerk in Suid-Afrika. (in Afrikaans) Kaapstad, 27 February 1930 till 1931.
