= Totius (poet) =

South African poet (1877–1953)

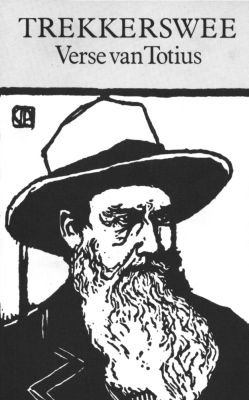
- Front cover of the poem volume Trekkerswee

Chancellor of the Potchefstroom University for Christian Higher Education
- In office 1951–1953
- Preceded by: Office established
- Succeeded by: Johannes Cornelis van Rooy

Personal details
- Born: Jacob Daniel du Toit; 21 February 1877 Paarl, Cape Colony
- Died: 1 July 1953 (aged 76) Pretoria, Transvaal, Union of South Africa
- Spouse: Maria du Toit (m. 1903)
- Children: 6 including, Stephanus du Toit
- Parent: Stephanus Jacobus du Toit (father)
- Relatives: Dirk Postma (father-in-law); Johanna Postma (mother-in-law)
- Education: Vrije Universiteit
- Writing career
- Pen name: Totius
- Language: Afrikaans

Jacob Daniël du Toit (21 February 1877 – 1 July 1953), known by the pseudonym Totius, was a South African Afrikaner poet, minister, theologian, translator and professor.

== Life ==
Jacob Daniël du Toit was born on the 21 February 1877 in Paarl, Cape Colony (present-day, South Africa) to Elizabeth Jacoba Joubert and Stephanus Jacobus du Toit, the leader of the First Afrikaans language movement.

The poet D.J. Opperman compiled brief biographical notes in Afrikaans about Du Toit. Du Toit began his education at the Huguenot Memorial School at Daljosafat in the Cape (1883–1885). He then moved to a German mission school named Morgensonne near Rustenburg from 1888 to 1890 before returning, between 1890 and 1894, to his original school at Daljosafat. Later he attended a theological college at Burgersdorp before becoming a military chaplain with the Boer Commandos during the Second Boer War.

After the war, he studied at the Free University in Amsterdam and received a Doctor of Theology degree. He became an ordained minister of the Reformed Church of South Africa and from 1911 he was a professor at the Theological College of this Reformed Church in Potchefstroom. On the celebration of his sixtieth birthday, Totius was honoured throughout South Africa. On the behalf of the nation, the FAK presented him with a Van Wouw-statuette as a token of gratitude for his work as a poet, Bible translator, cultural leader and academic. He also received a travel grant which enabled him and his wife to visit the Biblical countries and Europe. His impressions of these visits to foreign lands are included in the collection Skemering (1948). (The word Skemering is a pun and difficult to translate. It can be interpreted as "twilight" but also as "faint recollection"). In the same year, he also received honorary doctorates upon him by the University of Stellenbosch and the Gemeentelike Universiteit, Amsterdam.

Du Toit was a deeply religious man and a conservative one in most senses. His small son died of an infection and his young daughter, Wilhelmina, was killed by lightning, falling into his arms dead as she ran towards him. Du Toit recorded this calamity in the poem "O die pyn-gedagte" (literally "Oh the pain-thoughts").

Du Toit was responsible for much of the translation of the Bible into Afrikaans, finishing what his father Stephanus Jacobus du Toit had begun. He also put a huge amount of work into producing poetic versions of the Psalms in Afrikaans. His poetry was in the main lyrical and dealt, inter alia, with faith and with nature, as well as more political themes such as British imperialism and the Afrikaner nation. He left behind many collections of poems, including Trekkerswee (1915; “Trekkers' Grief”), Passieblomme (1934; “Passion Flowers”), "Uit donker Afrika" (1936; "From deep inside Africa") as well as a volume of poetry rhymed Psalms were published.

He was on the committee that founded Potchefstroom Gimnasium in 1907 and chancellor of the Potchefstroom University for Christian Higher Education, from 1951-1953.

== Poetry ==
One of the poems from Skemering was translated by C.J.D Harvey as follows:

"Night at Sea – Near Aden"

Nothing but sea and darkness everywhere
as when the earth was desolate and void
and o'er the world-pool hung night, unalloyed
No star and no horizon visible,
no sight or sign the wandering eye to guide,
I hear only the waves beating the side.
Though she sails always on, she now sails blind,
the prow thrusts forward, cleaving through the night.
Only upon the compass, shafts of light.

Another poem, from Passieblomme, translated by J.W. Marchant:

"The World is not our Dwelling Place"

The world is not our dwelling place
I see this in the sun that flees
and see it in the heron that, mistrustfully,
the same sun sees
on one leg from the reedy dale
and once the final rays are gone
a chill spills from this queachy lea
a frigid thrill runs right through me
I see it then in everything
that dusk throws round me in a ring
the world is not our dwelling place

The world is not our dwelling place
I see it when the moon blood red
rising from its field-dust bed
still (only just) the church-roof pares
from where an owl, abstrusely dumb,
sits and at that crescent stares.
As it grows quiet down the way
I recollect how, late today,
the mourners of the afternoon
emerged where owl now meets the moon
I mark it then in everything
while even tightens in a ring
the world is not our dwelling place

The world is not our dwelling place
I feel it when the winds awake
and oaken branches clash and break
I hear it in the fluttering
of little birds whose wings are thrown
against the branches smashed and blown
and find on coming closer yet
by moonbeam's vacillating light
a nest of fledglings overset
hurled down by tempest, shattered, dead
and feel it then in everything
as nighttime closes in a ring
the world is not our dwelling place

== Honors and recognition ==
Du Toit (under the name Totius) appeared on a South African postage stamp in 1977.

In 1977, a statue of Totius by the sculptor Jo Roos was placed in the Totius Garden of Remembrance, in Potchefstroom. The statue was restored by Roos in 2009, and moved to the Potchefstroom Campus of North-West University. It was removed in 2015 at the request of the Reformed Churches of South Africa (RCSA), after consultation with the Du Toit family, with the intention of instead displaying it on RCSA property.The request came after a group called ReformPUK didn't want the statue on the grounds of the university because they see him as a figure of apartheid.

== Personal life ==
In 1903, Totius married Marie du Toit (née Postma; 1881–1966), the daughter of Dirk Postma, the first minister of the Reformed Churches in South Africa, and Johanna Postma. Together Totius and Marie had 6 children including the Reformed Churches in South Africa Minister and academic Stephanus du Toit.

On 1 July 1953, Totius died in Pretoria, Union of South Africa (present-day, South Africa) aged 76.
