= Reformed Church in South Africa =

Reformed Church(es) in South Africa may refer to:

- Dutch Reformed Church in South Africa
  - Nederduitse Gereformeerde Kerk, Dutch Reformed Church in South Africa - NG Church
  - Nederduitsch Reformed Church in Africa – NH Church
  - Gereformeerde Kerke, Reformed Churches (in South Africa)
- Christian Reformed Church in South Africa
- Free Reformed Churches of South Africa
- Uniting Reformed Church in Southern Africa

== See also ==
- Dutch Reformed Church (disambiguation)
