= Dutch Reformed Church (disambiguation) =

The Dutch Reformed Church (NHK, from Dutch: Nederlandse Hervormde Kerk), was a Christian denomination in the Netherlands before its 2004 merger into the Protestant Church in the Netherlands.

Dutch Reformed Church may also refer to:

== Netherlands ==
- Dutch Reformed Churches (NGK, from Dutch: Nederlandse Gereformeerde Kerken), a denomination formed in 2023 as a merger between the Reformed Churches in the Netherlands (Liberated) and the Netherlands Reformed Churches
- Netherlands Reformed Churches (NGK, from Dutch: Nederlands Gereformeerde Kerken, formed in 1967 and merged into the above in 2023

== South Africa ==
=== Three sister churches ===
- Dutch Reformed Church in South Africa (NGK)
- Dutch Reformed Church in South Africa (NHK)
- Reformed Churches in South Africa (GK)

=== Other South African churches ===
- Uniting Reformed Church in Southern Africa (Verenigende Gereformeerde Kerk in Suid-Afrika), a merger of the Dutch Reformed Church in Africa and the Dutch Reformed Mission Church
- Afrikaans Protestant Church (Afrikaanse Protestantse Kerk), a conservative Reformed church that broke from the Dutch Reformed Church in South Africa (NGK) in 1987

== United States ==
- The Reformed Church in America
- The Christian Reformed Church in North America
- Protestant Reformed Churches in America
- United Reformed Churches in North America

=== Individual churches ===
- Dutch Reformed Church (Harrodsburg, Kentucky), listed on the National Register of Historic Places in Mercer County, Kentucky
- Fairfield Dutch Reformed Church, Fairfield Township, Essex County, New Jersey, listed on the NRHP in New Jersey
- Reformed Dutch Church of Second River, Belleville, New Jersey, listed on the NRHP in New Jersey
- Holmdel Dutch Reformed Church, Holmdel, New Jersey, listed on the NRHP in New Jersey
- Dutch Reformed Church at Romopock, Mahwah, New Jersey, listed on the NRHP in New Jersey
- Dutch Reformed Church (New Brunswick, New Jersey), listed on the National Register of Historic Places in Middlesex County, New Jersey
- Second Reformed Church, New Brunswick, New Jersey
- Dutch Reformed Church in the English Neighborhood, Ridgefield, New Jersey, listed on the NRHP in New Jersey
- Dutch Reformed Church of Gansevoort, Gansevoort, New York, listed on the NRHP in New York
- Leeds Dutch Reformed Church, Leeds, New York, listed on the NRHP in New York
- Flatbush Dutch Reformed Church Complex, New York, New York, listed on the NRHP in New York
- Flatlands Dutch Reformed Church, New York, New York, listed on the NRHP in New York
- Dutch Reformed Church (Newburgh, New York), listed on the National Register of Historic Places in Orange County, New York
- Old Dutch Church of Sleepy Hollow, Sleepy Hollow, New York, listed on the National Register of Historic Places in Westchester County, New York as Dutch Reformed Church
- Dingman's Ferry Dutch Reformed Church, Dingman's Ferry, Pennsylvania, listed on the National Register of Historic Places in Pike County, Pennsylvania
- Old Brick Reformed Church, Marlboro, New Jersey
- South Schraalenburgh Church, Bergenfield, New Jersey, listed on the National Register of Historic Places in Bergen County, New Jersey
- Schraalenburgh North Church, Dumont, New Jersey, listed on the National Register of Historic Places in Bergen County, New Jersey
- New North Reformed Low Dutch Church, Upper Saddle River, New Jersey, listed on the National Register of Historic Places in Bergen County, New Jersey
- Reformed Dutch Church of Blawenburg, Blawenburg, New Jersey, listed on the National Register of Historic Places in Somerset County, New Jersey
- Old Bergen Church, Jersey City, New Jersey, listed on the National Register of Historic Places in Hudson County, New Jersey
- Second Reformed Dutch Church, Newark, New Jersey, listed on the National Register of Historic Places in Essex County, New Jersey
