= Pretoria Reformed Church (NGK) =

Church in Pretoria, South Africa

Coordinates: 25°44′44″S 28°11′6″E

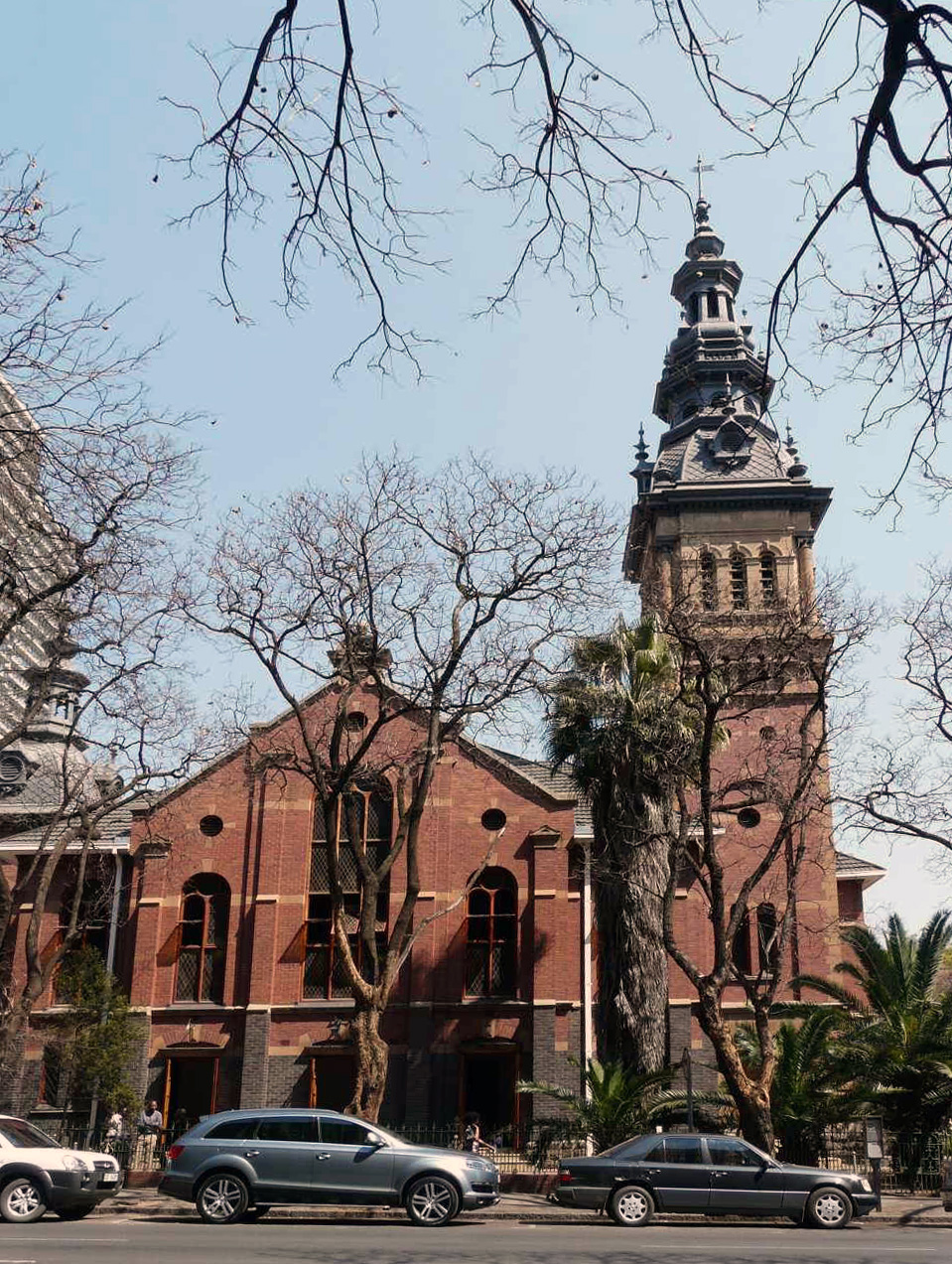
- Pretoria Reformed Church
- Location: Pretoria
- Country: South Africa
- Denomination: Nederduits Gereformeerde Kerk

History
- Founded: 1854

Architecture
- Functional status: Church

The Pretoria Reformed Church is the oldest congregation of the Dutch Reformed Church in Pretoria and approximately the 59th oldest congregation in the church. Before the division of the Transvaal Church into two, three and later four Synods, it was the fifth oldest Transvaal congregation, just 12 years younger than the oldest, Potchefstroom, founded in 1842. Due to drastic demographic changes in the central parts of Pretoria since 1990, the congregation has consisted of six composite parts since 2000, namely the old mother congregation, Bronberg (1942), Burgerspark (1952), Arcadia (1951, to which Meintjeskop was incorporated in 1964) and Harmonie (1957). By 2017, a handful of Afrikaans-speaking NG members remained in this area.

== Foundation ==
The Pretoria congregation dates from the year 1854 or '55, when only 28 dwellings stood on the site where one of the largest cities in South Africa and the administrative capital would later arise. Because the current NG congregation in Pretoria is a continuation of the Pretoria Reformed congregation that existed until 1885 – when the two denominations merged, but a portion of the Reformed Church continued to exist as such – the founding date of this congregation is also that of the Pretoria Reformed congregation, namely the weekend of 8 and 9 September 1855.

The congregation was vacant for almost eight years while Rev. Dirk Van der Hoff, the founder of the Dutch Reformed Church, was the church's only minister in the Transvaal. Because no minister could be obtained from the Cape Colony, the members turned to Holland where Rev. A.J. Begemann accepted the call on certain conditions. After accepting the call, he was ordained as minister of the Transvaal in the Groote Kerk of the Reformed congregation in The Hague on 7 March 1860. After arriving in the Cape on 21 June of that year, he officiated the service in the Groote Kerk on behalf of Rev. S.P. Heyns on Sunday 24 June. On 30 June he left for Natal by ship and from there travelled by oxcart to Potchefstroom where he arrived on 8 December. On Sunday 27 January 1862 Rev. van der Hoff confirmed him as Pretoria's first minister.

== Ministers ==
- A.J. Begemann, 1860–1872 (born 15 June 1831 in Netherlands)
- Hermanus Stephanus Bosman, 1876–1926 (accepted his emeritus position; died 3 April 1933)
- Herman Dirk van Broekhuizen, 1906–1917 (transferred to the Nederduitsch Hervormde Kerk)
- Johannes Stefanus Theron, 1921–1925
- Charles Daniel Murray, 1927–1943 (accepted his emeritus position; died 18 June 1948)
- Jacobus Francois du Toit, 1930–1935
- Dr. Willem de Wet Strauss, 1937–1939, 1961 – 11 April 1976 (accepts his emeritus position)
- Dr. Barend Jacobus (Ben) Marais, 1938–1941 (student teacher; after which the same office in Pretoria East)
- Johannes Reyneke, 1941–1956
- Gerhardus Johannes Davidtsz, 1944–1967
- Jacobus Cornelius Gideon Kotzé, 1944–1950
- Andries Jacobus Pienaar, 1950–1952 (after which until 1959 of the Arcadia)
- Francois Guillaume Marais du Toit, 1951–1962 (and organizing secretary of the CPGV)
- Pieter Willem Marais, 1954–1955
- Nicolaas Franciscus Petrus Burger, 1956–1960
- Pieter Daniël Jacobus de Witt, 1956–1957
- Andries Petrus Treurnicht, 1958–1960
- Alfred Clement Sephton, 1961–1969
- Jan Abraham Durand, 1967–1973
- Jacob Stephanus Dreyer, 25 April 1970 – 27 June 1993 (accepts his emeritus position)
- Johan Henning Jacobus de Witt, 1969–1972
- Bernardus Thomas Richard, 15 March 1974 – 1 January 1980 (at his death, focused on youth work)
- Jacobus Gerhardus van Coller, 1977–1980 (temporarily out of ministry)
- Dr. Johannes van Schalkwyk, 1977–1981
- Dr. Coenraad Frederik Bekker, 1980 – 31 January 1994 (accepts his emeritus position)
- James Nehemia Klynveld, 1982–1988
- Johanens Petrus Wessels, 1980–1985
- Ernst Ludwig Rischmüller, 1984–1992 (police chaplain)
- Frederik Nicolaas Huysamen, 1986–1996 (resignation, recallable; from ministry in same year)
- Dr. André Eugene de la Porte, 1988–?
- Cornelius Johannes Jacobus Müller, 1992–2011 (police chaplain)
- Dr. Abraham Kriel le Roux, 1988–present (passed on with incorporation of Arcadia)
- Dr. Daniël Petrus Veldsman, 1996–2007; 2007 – (confirmed with assignment theological training)
- Marthinus Jacobus Swart, 1984–present (tentmaker, later English ministry; passed on with incorporation of Arcadia)
- Dr. Marinda van Niekerk, 1995–1999 (tentmaker; later PEN action)
- Dr. Petrus Jacobus le Roux, 1997–2010 (transferred from Bronberg; accepted his emeritus position in the Pretoria municipality)
- Petrus Francois Smit, 2003–present (PEN action)
- Andries Schwartz, 2009–present (PEN action)
- Sharaine Steenberg, 2013 – 2016 (PEN action)
- George Jacobus van Wyngaardt, 2013–present (tentmaker)
- Elaine Dippenaar, 2015 – 2017 (PEN action)
- Hendrien van Vliet 2016–present (tentmaker)

== Sources ==
- (in Afrikaans) Engelbrecht, prof. dr. S.P. 1955. Die Nederduitsch Hervormde Gemeente Pretoria 1855–1955. Pretoria: NH kerkraad.
- (in Dutch) Maeder, ds. G.A. en Zinn, Christian. 1917. Ons Kerk Album. Kaapstad: Ons Kerk Album Maatschappij Bpkt.
- (in Afrikaans) Olivier, ds. P.L. (samesteller), Ons gemeentelike feesalbum. Kaapstad en Pretoria: N.G. Kerk-uitgewers, 1952.
- (in Afrikaans) Swart, dr. M.J. (voorsitter redaksiekomitee). 1980. Afrikaanse kultuuralmanak. Aucklandpark: Federasie van Afrikaanse Kultuurvereniginge.
