= Abraham Faure =

Cape Colony clergyman and author

The Reverend Abraham Faure DD
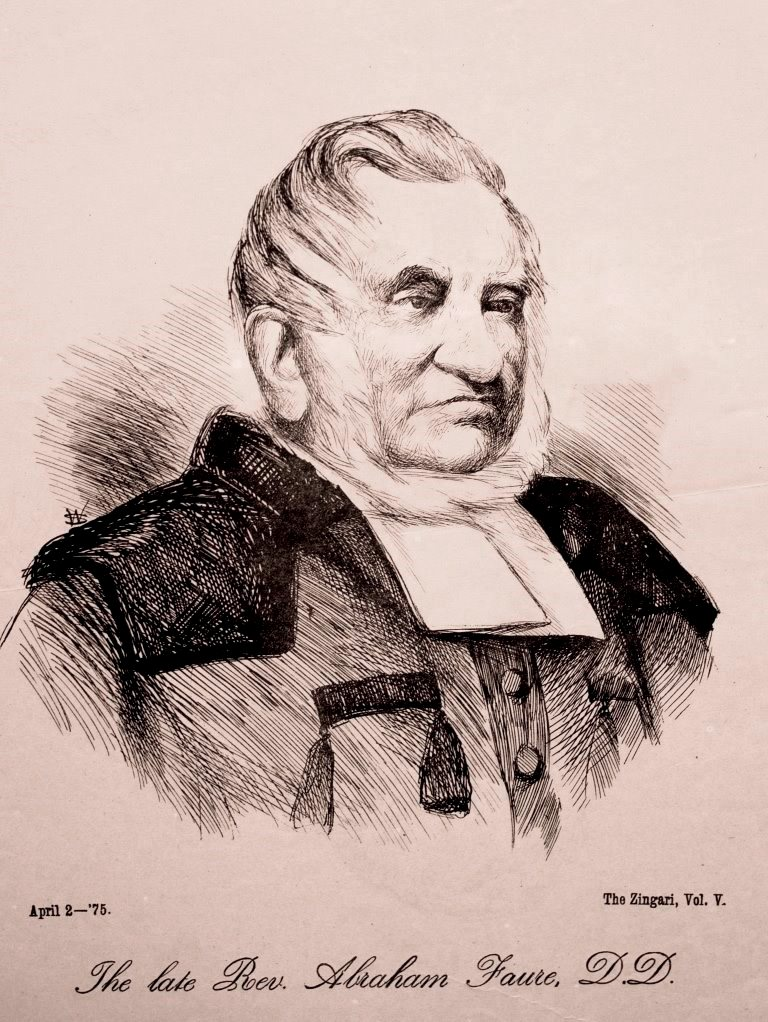
- The Rev. Abraham Faure. 2 April 1875, Zingari Vol V.

Personal life
- Born: 29 August 1795 Stellenbosch
- Died: 28 March 1875 (aged 79) Cape Town
- Spouse: Geertruida Isabella Caldwell (m. 1818)
- Children: 12
- Parents: Jacobus Christiaan Faure (father); Alletta Hendrina Blankenberg (mother)
- Relatives: Philip Eduard Faure (brother)

Religious life
- Religion: Christianity
- Church: Dutch Reformed Church in South Africa

Abraham Faure (29 August 1795 – 28 March 1875) was a clergyman and author from Cape Colony, part of what later became South Africa.

== Church career ==
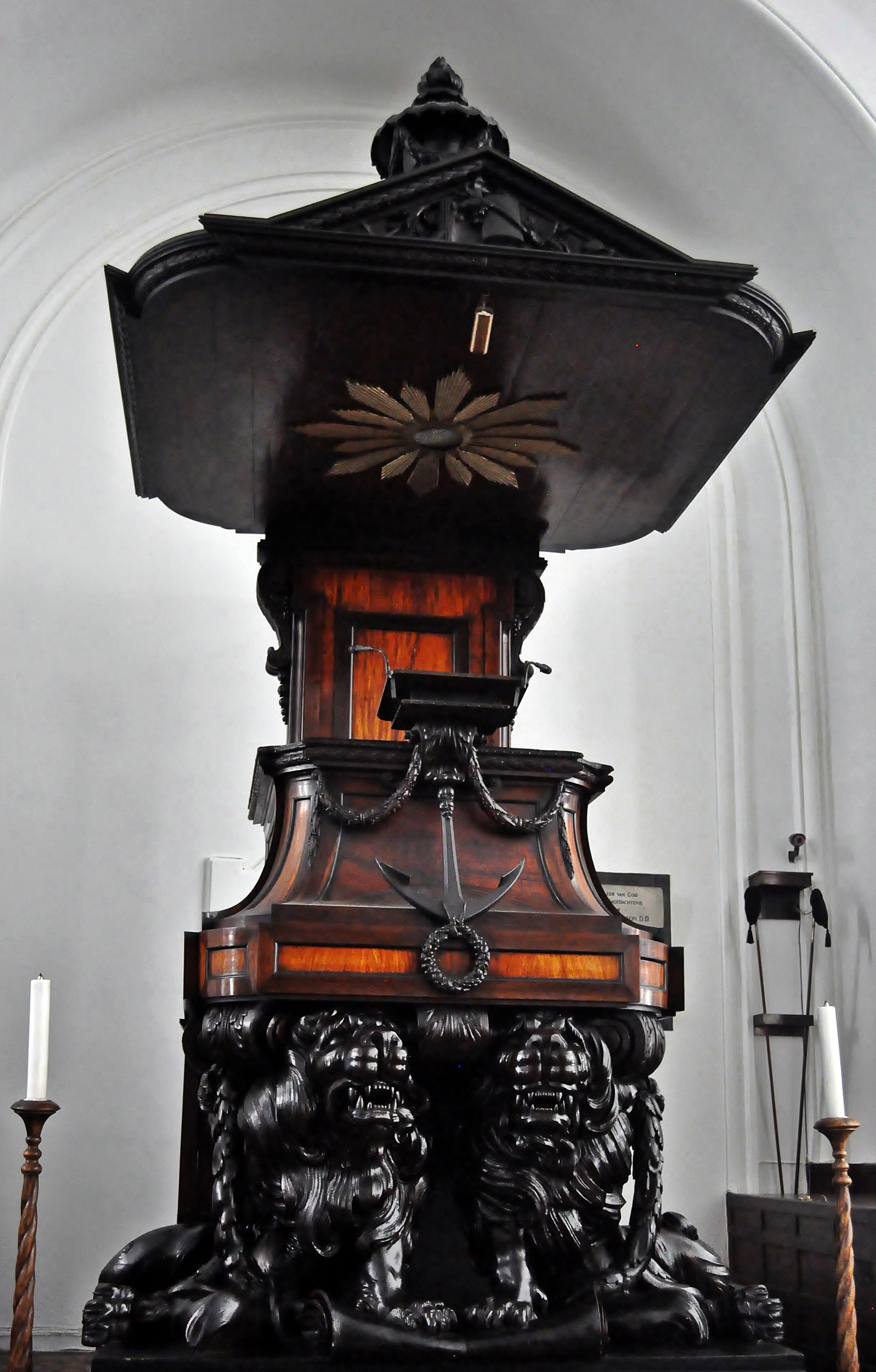
Pulpit of the Groote Kerk.

Born in Stellenbosch, Faure was educated in both England and the Netherlands and, with a strong Calvinist background, in 1818 he was inducted as a dominee (minister) in the Dutch Reformed Church in Graaff-Reinet, Cape Colony. In 1822 he was called to the Groote Kerk in Cape Town ^{(AF)}, where he played a significant role in the first synod there in 1824. He remained a member of the church executive for 43 years. He married Geertruida Isabella Caldwell. His family was heavily involved in the Church and his relative Philip Eduard Faure was also a Doctor of Divinities and a Moderator of the Dutch Reformed Synod.

== Political involvement ==
Politically Faure remained loyal to the British Crown on grounds that the Crown was part of the God-willed social order, expressing disapproval of the Dutch farmers who left the Cape Colony at the time of the Great Trek. His sermon on the occasion of the 200th anniversary of the arrival of Dutch settlers under van Riebeeck reflected social responsibility, this time the responsibility of the Dutch Reformed Church for bringing the gospel to the [former] slaves and the indigenous population.
