= Pretoria Reformed Church =

Pretoria Reformed Church may refer to:

- Pretoria Reformed Church (GKSA), affiliated with the Reformed Churches in South Africa
- Pretoria Reformed Church (NGK), affiliated with the Dutch Reformed Church in South Africa (NGK)
