= Bronberg Reformed Church =

Coordinates: 25.75415°S 28.20966°E

The Bronberg Reformed Church (Afrikaans: NG gemeente Bronberg) was one of the largest congregations in the Dutch Reformed Church in South Africa (NGK), not only in the Pretoria area but nationwide. After the massive demographic changes of the 1990s in central Pretoria, the Bronberg, Arcadia (which had earlier absorbed Meintjieskop, Burgers Park, and Harmonie congregations were all absorbed by the Pretoria Reformed Church (NGK).

== Foundation ==
Until the evening of October 15, 1942, the congregation's area made up the western portions of the then enormous Pretoria East Reformed Church (NGK), which had four pastors and around 90 council members. The congregation started off with large parts of Sunnyside, Muckleneuk, and Arcadia. The congregation took its name from the original name of Muckleneuk Ridge, the Bronberge. Beeld described the etymology as follows:

The Bronberg NGK congregation in Sunnyside celebrating its 50th birthday next year was named by a charter deacon who served as a recorder of deeds at the time. Mr. Carl Basson (78) of Lynnwood, Pretoria had access as such to the office of the Surveyor-General. He visited that office looking for inspiration when it came time to name the congregation, finding an 1875 map showing the ridge from Die Wilgers to near UNISA in Muckleneuk, first labeled the Bronberge. Fountains Valley was then known as De Bronen ("the source"). Several names were considered at the following congregation meeting, including Sunnyside, Ebenaser, and Immanuël, but Mr. Basson reported that the majority was in favor of the last suggestion, his own.

Services were at first held in the renovated Sunnyside Hall, formerly used by the main Pretoria congregation and then by Pretoria East until the latter's current church (the "Ooskerk") was built. The Rev. Hendrik Daniël Alphonso du Toit (later pastor of the Paarl Reformed Church (NGK)) was confirmed on the first ballot on the evening of Monday, November 2, 1942, and he served the congregation until June 1948. The Rev. Herman Kinghorn (later working in the Robertson Reformed Church among others) was co-pastor from May 1947 to June 1950, joined by Dr. Louis Viljoen Rex from August 1948, who would work alone afterwards until 1953.

== Later developments ==
The Arcadia congregation officially seceded at the June 19, 1951 council meeting, several months after the Ring (Sub-Synod) Committee approved of it.

The Bronberg congregation was dominated by transient students and youth. However, they secured a church site for themselves quite early. The building, designed by architect Hendrik Vermooten, was inaugurated on January 22, 1955, and now belongs to the Pretoria congregation.

In 1952, Ons gemeentelik feesalbum wrote:

Bronberg was known for the high level of volunteering among the around a thousand young people in its congregation, especially in the civil service, who lived in temporary housing or apartments for significant periods of time. Contacts with the youth there are very encouraging and inspirational. Their high attendance levels at church and interest in ecclesiastical affairs speaks to their strong attachment to the church and mission. Our evening services are always youth-oriented, and we hold monthly meetings to allow the pastor and church council to keep up with the rapidly changing lives of the younger members. An accurate membership survey will no doubt reveal two thousand or more members of our Church living within the congregation boundaries of Bronberg. Permanent residents and homeowners make up a very small percentage of our membership, but they form the core of the congregation, serving the higher interests of the congregation with great strength, sacrifice, and dedication. Bronberg's strength is its ability to maintain an active congregational life among all the distractions of the city. Great praise is owed to our zealous and dedicated church council members who conduct the difficult task of meeting monthly with all ward members.

A monthly congregation newsletter, Die Bronbergse Bode, was active at the time as well.

== Select pastors ==
- Hendrik Daniël Alphonso du Toit, 1942 - 1948
- Hermanus Charles Kinghorn, 1947 - 1950
- Dr. L.V. Rex, 1948 - 1953
- Rudolph Johannes Raath, 1953 - February 29m 1976 (retired)
- Dirk Johannes Viljoen, 1955 - 1957 (student pastor; afterward student pastor of the new Harmonie spinoff)
- Dr. Hermanus Wilhelm de Jager, 1962 – 1967
- J.R. Schmidt ... 1972
- P.A. van der Merwe ... 1972
- S.J. Joubert ... 1972
- Michiel Daniel Victor Cloete, 1967 – February 28, 1975
- S.J. Joubert ... 1979
- A.J. Barnard ... 1979
- H.F. Heymann ... 1979
- P. Combrink ... 1979
- Dr. Petrus Jacobus le Roux, 1997 - 2010 (retired in the Pretoria congregation)
- Dr. Casparus Johannes Jackson, 1979 - 1995 (retired)
- Abraham Johannes Prinsloo, 1982 - 1988 (retired)
- Dr. Garfield Havemann ... 1985
- Paul Geertsema?

== Sources ==
- (af) Olivier, Rev. P.L. (compiler) (1952). Ons gemeentelike feesalbum. Cape Town/Pretoria: N.G. Kerk-uitgewers.
