= Dutch Reformed Church in South Africa =

Three churches from the Dutch Reformed Church tradition in South Africa are often mentioned together as "three sister churches". They are the Dutch Reformed Church in South Africa (NGK), Dutch Reformed Church in South Africa (NHK), and Reformed Churches in South Africa (GK).

The NGK originated in the 17th century from the Dutch Reformed Church of the Netherlands. It has congregations in South Africa, Namibia, Eswatini, Botswana, Zimbabwe and Zambia. It is the largest and most liberal church within South Africa's Dutch Reformed Church tradition, claiming 1.1 million members and 1,626 ordained ministers in 1,162 congregations.

The NHK developed as an autonomous reformed church in South Africa during the Great Trek in the late 1850s, because the church in the Cape Colony under British rule did not minister to them. It has congregations in South Africa, Namibia, Botswana, Zambia and Zimbabwe.

The GK was formed in 1859 by church members who refused to sing songs from a new hymn book and who were concerned about power being taken away from local church councils. It has congregations in South Africa, Namibia, Botswana, Zimbabwe and Zambia. It claims 397 congregations.

== See also ==
- Dutch Reformed Church (disambiguation)
