= David du Plessis =

South African-born American Pentecostal minister

David Johannes du Plessis (7 February 1905 – 2 February 1987) was a South African-born American charismatic minister. He is considered one of the main founders of the charismatic movement, in which the Pentecostal experience of baptism with the Holy Spirit spread to non-Pentecostal churches worldwide.

== Biography ==
Born to missionary parents, an 11-year-old du Plessis accepted Christ in 1916, and he received the baptism with the Holy Spirit accompanied by speaking in tongues at the age of 13. He was ordained in 1928 by the Apostolic Faith Mission of South Africa (AFM). In 1935, he became the general secretary of the denomination where he advocated closer ties between the AFM and South Africa's three sister churches. He later recalled that in 1936 Smith Wigglesworth, during a preaching tour in South Africa, prophesied over him that God would out pour his Spirit upon the historic churches and that he, Du Plessis, would be greatly involved in this.

He worked with Donald Gee to promote cooperation among Pentecostal groups and was involved in organizing the first Pentecostal World Conference (PWC) in 1947. A year later, he resigned as secretary of the AFM to become organizing secretary for the PWC. He served in this role for nine years until 1959.

Du Plessis and his family moved to the United States in the late 1940s. He taught at Lee College, a Church of God (Cleveland, Tennessee) school, from 1949 to 1951. He received preaching credentials from the Assemblies of God (USA) and moved to Stamford, Connecticut, in 1952 to serve as interim pastor of Stamford Gospel Tabernacle. In 1962, he surrendered his Assemblies of God preaching credentials under pressure from denominational leadership who opposed his ecumenical efforts. He remained a member of an Assemblies of God church in Oakland, California, and in 1980 his credentials were restored.

Originally shunning other movements, he became an active believer in ecumenism, beginning his efforts in the 1950s to share the Pentecostal experience with Christians in the historic denominations, chiefly Roman Catholicism. His main gateway into ecumenism was through his friendship with John McKay, then President of Princeton Seminary, New Jersey. McKay invited Du Plessis to address the International Missionary Council in Willingen, West Germany, in 1952. There he earned the nickname "Mr Pentecost".

He was a member of staff and Pentecostal "observer" at the World Council of Churches in 1954 and 1961, respectively, and was invited to serve as a Pentecostal observer at the Second Vatican Council.

Du Plessis entitled his autobiography The Spirit Bade Me Go, as he believed God had commanded him to take the Pentecostal message to other denominations, and in particular the World Council of Churches. Recounting a meeting with 24 ecumenical leaders in Connecticut, Du Plessis wrote:

"I could remember days when I had wished I could have set my eyes upon such men to denounce their theology and pray the judgment of God upon them for what I considered their heresies and false doctrines. [...] After a few introductory words, I suddenly felt a warm glow come over me. I knew this was the Holy Spirit taking over, but, what was He doing to me? Instead of the old harsh spirit of criticism and condemnation in my heart, I now felt such love and compassion for these ecclesiastical leaders that I would rather have died for them than pass sentence upon them."

== See also ==
- Catholic Charismatic Renewal
