= Afrikaans Protestant Church =

South African denomination

Afrikaanse Protestantse Kerk (APK)
- Official Logo of the Afrikaanse Protestantse Kerk
- Classification: Protestant
- Theology: Reformed, conservative, separatist
- Polity: Presbyterian
- Region: South Africa, Namibia and England
- Origin: 1987; Pretoria, South Africa
- Separated from: Dutch Reformed Church in South Africa (NGK)
- Congregations: 193
- Members: 35,000
- Ministers: 75 plus 55
- Official website: http://apk.co.za/

The Afrikaanse Protestantse Kerk (APK; Afrikaans Protestant Church), also known as AP Kerk, is a South African conservative Reformed Church federation with about 35,000 adherents. The federation consists of 103 congregations, mostly in South Africa, although the APK also includes 7 congregations in Namibia.

== Formation ==
In 1982 the World Alliance of Reformed Churches' General Council declared apartheid to be a sin and its theological justification a heresy, in the process expelling from its membership the Dutch Reformed Church in South Africa (NGK), the major branch of the Dutch Reformed Church (DRC) in South Africa and the traditional mother church of South Africa's Afrikaner population. The shock of this isolation from other branches of the Reformed Churches worldwide led to the adoption in 1986 of the Belhar Confession by some branches of the DRC; the NGK, while stopping short of adopting the Belhar Confession, retracted its 1976 defence of apartheid as a biblical imperative, instead releasing a "more nuanced" document called Church and Society that provided "qualified support for separate development."

However, the document "reflected the new majority consensus within the NGK which rejected the older, Kuyperian theology" and thus outraged the more conservative clergy within the NGK: as a "direct result" the Afrikaanse Protestantse Kerk was founded in Pretoria on Saturday, 27 June 1987 by 3000 dissidents, together with conservative elements from other branches of the DRC in South Africa.

Members of the APK also cited the influence of Arminian and liberal theology in the NGK as a reason to split off. The new church opposed the use of the 1983 Afrikaans Bible translation during worship services, preferring to use older translations. The APK opposed reforms it considered as modernist and sought to preserve traditional Calvinism.

== Growth ==
In 1988 the APK set up a seminary so its pastors could be trained independently, the Afrikaanse Protestantse Akademie, which is based in Pretoria. The seminary became independent in 1999, although still trains APK pastors.

In 1990 Church and Society was revised by the NGK to indicate that "any attempt by a church to try to defend a system of separation, biblically and ethically must be seen as a serious errancy; that is to say, it is in conflict with the Bible." From the APK's point of view that was not acceptable; it continued its support of apartheid. The decision of the NGK widened the schism and led to an increase in conservative NGK congregations that joined the APK.

== Theology ==
The Church holds to the Bible as the infallible Word of God and the singlular final authority in all matters of faith. Like most offshoots of the DRC, the APK focuses its theology around the Three Forms of Unity and is Calvinist in doctrine. It believes the biblical faith to be accurately summarised in the ecumenical confessions (the Apostles' Creed, the Nicene Creed, the Athanasian Creed), the Belgic Confession, the Heidelberg Catechism and the Canons of Dordt.

The church also holds to the traditional, pre-1986 views of the DRC in that it believes that the Bible not only condones, but actively prescribes, racial segregation. Its foundation in 1987 was precisely to uphold the traditional, racist theology of the DRC. It thus does not consider the 1986 Belhar Confession as a creed of the church. This belief is traditionally justified on their interpretation of God's commandment to the Israelites in the Old Testament to separate themselves from the heathen nations.

== Motto ==
The church's official motto is lig in duisternis (meaning light in the darkness) from 1 John 2:9-11

If we say that we are in the light, yet hate others, we are in the darkness to this very hour. If we love others, we live in the light, and so there is nothing in us that will cause someone else to sin. But if we hate others, we are in the darkness; we walk in it and do not know where we are going, because the darkness has made us blind.

and also from John 12:35–36:

So Jesus said to them, "The light is among you for a little while longer. Walk while you have the light, lest darkness overtake you. The one who walks in the darkness does not know where he is going. While you have the light, believe in the light, that you may become sons of light."

== Church Publications ==
- Die Boodskapper
- Basuingeklank
- Redakteursforum
- 7-Voor-7
- Lig in Duisternis Produksies
