= Belhar Confession =

1982 Christian statement of belief

The Belhar Confession (Afrikaans: Belydenis van Belhar) is a Christian statement of belief written in Afrikaans in 1982. It was adopted (after a slight adjustment) as a confession of faith by the Dutch Reformed Mission Church (DRMC) in South Africa in 1986.

== Themes ==
According to the Belhar Confession, unity is both a gift and an obligation for the church. This unity originally referred to non-segregation between Christians of different races, but after the formation of the Uniting Reformed Church in Southern Africa (URCSA) in 1994, the word "unity" came to refer to administrative unity within the managerial structures of the denomination.

Another key theme of the Belhar Confession is the dichotomy of reconciliation and the justice of God. According to the confession, God is the God of the destitute, the poor, and the wronged, and for this reason the church should stand by people in any form of suffering. It claims that individual, racial and social segregation is sin, and that all forms of segregation always lead to enmity and hatred.

== Adoption by the Dutch Reformed Church in South Africa ==
The URCSA has made it a prerequisite for the Dutch Reformed Church in South Africa (NGK) to join the united denomination that all of its members adopt the Belhar Confession. Although the NGK is eager to join the new denomination, it has decided not to compel existing members to submit to the confession. The NGK had offered to compel only new members of the NGK to submit to the confession, and to request existing members to submit to it voluntarily, but this offer was rejected by the URCSA. The URCSA's position was that all members of the NGK should be required to swear that the Belhar Confession is true, or be expelled from the denomination.

The NGK's opinion of the Belhar Confession had varied over the years. Initially, the NGK rejected the confession as being a political document or as a statement of Liberation Theology. Some time later the NGK acknowledged that the document's contents were true, with the proviso that references in the Belhar Confession to "the poor" not be regarded as an implicit reference only to non-whites. At the 2011 meeting of the General Assembly of the NGK, it was decided that processes to make the Belhar Confession part of the confessional base of the NGK should be initiated by its leadership.

== Adoption by non-South African churches ==
The Evangelical Reformed Church in Africa in Namibia (ERCA) adopted the Belhar Confession in 1997 and in so doing became the first non-South African Church which adopted the Belhar Confession. Apart from the URCSA, the Belhar Confession was also adopted by the United Protestant Church in Belgium in 1998.

The Reformed Church in America (RCA) adopted the Belhar Confession as a fourth Standard of Unity (or confession; alongside the Belgic Confession, the Heidelberg Catechism, and the Canons of Dort) at its 2010 meeting of the General Synod, having adopted it provisionally in 2007.

The 2009 Synod of the Christian Reformed Church of North America (CRCNA) proposed to the 2012 Synod that the Belhar Confession be adopted as their fourth confession of faith. Instead, the CRCNA created a new, less-binding category for the Belhar, and adopted it as an "Ecumenical Faith Declaration" During CRCNA's Synod 2017, the church recategorized the Belhar Confession as a "Contemporary Testimony".

The confession was also instrumental in the RCA's efforts to found the Reformed Church in the Dominican Republic.

The Presbyterian Church (USA) has added the Belhar Confession to its Book of Confessions. In 2014, the denomination's 221st General Assembly submitted the proposal to the denomination's 171 presbyteries for ratification. The required 2/3 approval having been received, the final step was a vote at the 222nd General Assembly (2016) meeting June 18–25 in Portland, Oregon. The Belhar Confession was adopted at the 222nd General Assembly on June 22, 2016, by a 540–33 vote in favor of acceptance.

== See also ==
- Accra Confession
