= Blawenburg, New Jersey =

Populated place in Somerset County, New Jersey, US

- Census-designated place
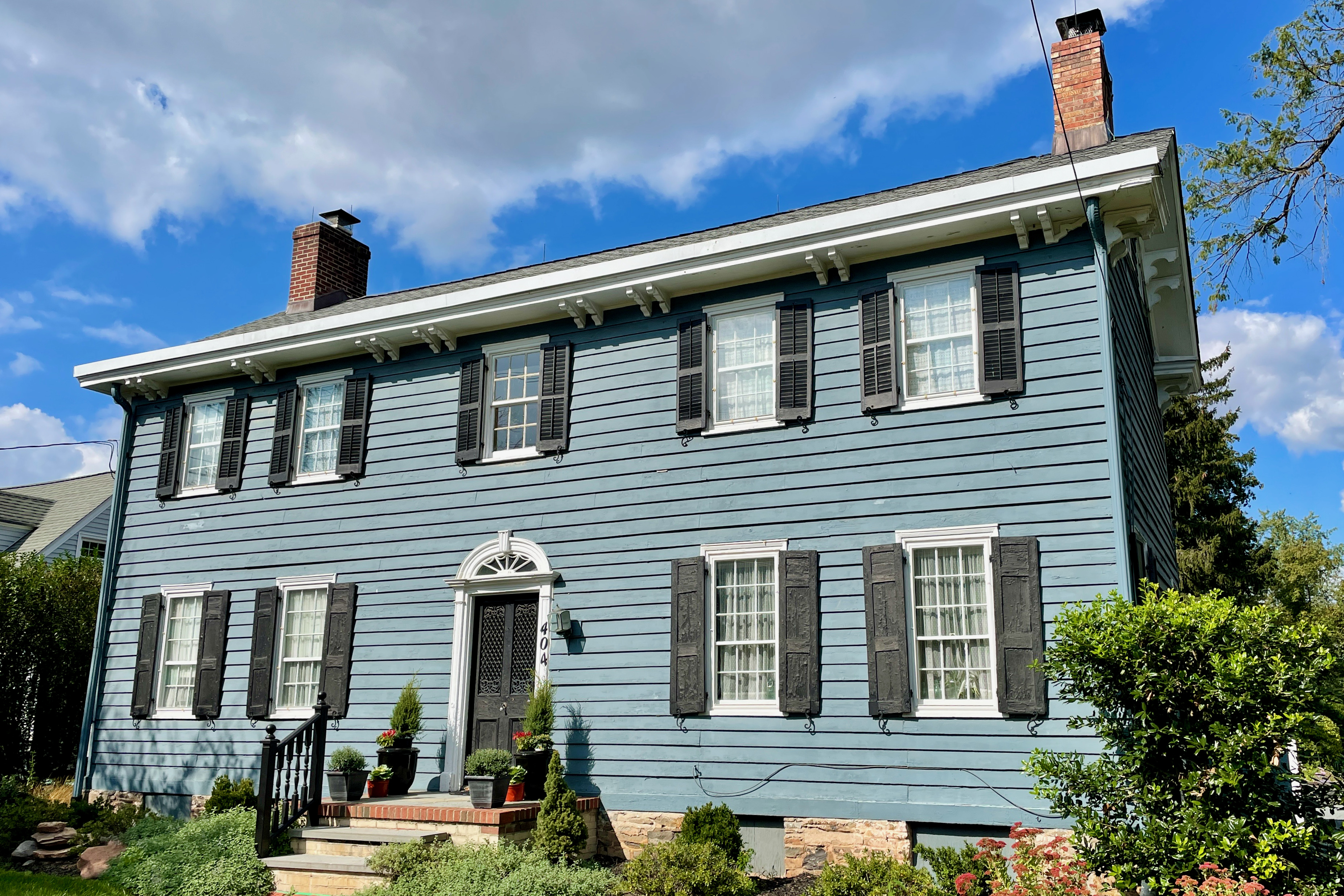
- Blawenburg Tavern

- Location in Somerset County Location in New Jersey Location in the United States
- Coordinates: 40.402646°N 74.698566°W
- Country: United States
- State: New Jersey
- County: Somerset
- Township: Montgomery

Area
  - Total: 0.61 sq mi (1.59 km^{2})
  - Land: 0.61 sq mi (1.58 km^{2})
  - Water: 0.0039 sq mi (0.01 km^{2}) 0.69%
- Elevation: 118 ft (36 m)

Population (2020)
  - Total: 287
  - Density: 472/sq mi (182.2/km^{2})
- Time zone: UTC−05:00 (Eastern (EST))
  - Summer (DST): UTC−04:00 (Eastern (EDT))
- ZIP Code: 08504
- Area codes: 609/640 and 732/848
- FIPS code: 34-06190
- GNIS feature ID: 02583970

Blawenburg is an unincorporated community and census-designated place (CDP) located within Montgomery Township, in Somerset County, in the U.S. state of New Jersey. As of the 2020 census, Blawenburg had a population of 287. It is located at the juncture of two large roads, CR 518 and CR 601.

== History ==
The area that was eventually known as Blawenburg was settled by John Blaw prior to 1742 when he purchased 400 acres (160 ha) of farmland from Abraham Van Horn, a merchant of New York City and a large New Jersey landholder, and 95 acres (38 ha) adjacent to this tract from Nicholas Lake of New Brunswick. John's father was Jan Frederickse Blaw, a refugee from Holland, born in Recife, Pernambuco, Brazil, who settled in New Amsterdam where John Blaw was born. John had a son Michael who ran a mill at the point where the Great Road crosses Beden's Brook, and it is believed that Blaw's Mill was the origin of the name Blawenburg.

The Blawenburg Reformed Church was established here in 1832. The James Van Zandt Mansion was built 1860–1865.

== Geography ==
According to the United States Census Bureau, Blawenburg had a total area of 0.612 square miles (1.586 km^{2}), including 0.608 square miles (1.575 km^{2}) of land and 0.004 square miles (0.011 km^{2}) of water (0.69 percent).

== Demographics ==
Historical population
Census	Pop.	Note	%±
2010	280		—
2020	287		2.5%
Population sources: 2010 2020

Blawenburg first appeared as a census designated place in the 2010 U.S. census.

=== 2020 census ===
Blawenburg CDP, New Jersey – Racial and ethnic composition Note: the US Census treats Hispanic/Latino as an ethnic category. This table excludes Latinos from the racial categories and assigns them to a separate category. Hispanics/Latinos may be of any race.
Race / Ethnicity (NH = Non-Hispanic)	Pop 2010	Pop 2020	% 2010	% 2020
White alone (NH)	207	202	73.93%	70.38%
Black or African American alone (NH)	0	1	0.00%	0.35%
Native American or Alaska Native alone (NH)	0	0	0.00%	0.00%
Asian alone (NH)	54	60	19.29%	20.91%
Native Hawaiian or Pacific Islander alone (NH)	0	0	0.00%	0.00%
Other race alone (NH)	0	2	0.00%	0.70%
Mixed race or Multiracial (NH)	15	4	5.36%	1.39%
Hispanic or Latino (any race)	4	18	1.43%	6.27%
Total	280	287	100.00%	100.00%

=== 2010 census ===
The 2010 United States census counted 280 people, 107 households, and 73 families in the CDP. The population density was 460.4 per square mile (177.8/km^{2}). There were 115 housing units at an average density of 189.1 per square mile (73.0/km^{2}). The racial makeup was 75.36% (211) White, 0.00% (0) Black or African American, 0.00% (0) Native American, 19.29% (54) Asian, 0.00% (0) Pacific Islander, 0.00% (0) from other races, and 5.36% (15) from two or more races. Hispanic or Latino of any race were 1.43% (4) of the population.

Of the 107 households, 31.8% had children under the age of 18; 61.7% were married couples living together; 4.7% had a female householder with no husband present and 31.8% were non-families. Of all households, 27.1% were made up of individuals and 9.3% had someone living alone who was 65 years of age or older. The average household size was 2.62 and the average family size was 3.23.

24.3% of the population were under the age of 18, 5.4% from 18 to 24, 20.4% from 25 to 44, 31.4% from 45 to 64, and 18.6% who were 65 years of age or older. The median age was 45.0 years. For every 100 females, the population had 87.9 males. For every 100 females ages 18 and older there were 87.6 males.

== Historic district ==
- Blawenburg Historic District
- U.S. National Register of Historic Places
- U.S. Historic district
- New Jersey Register of Historic Places
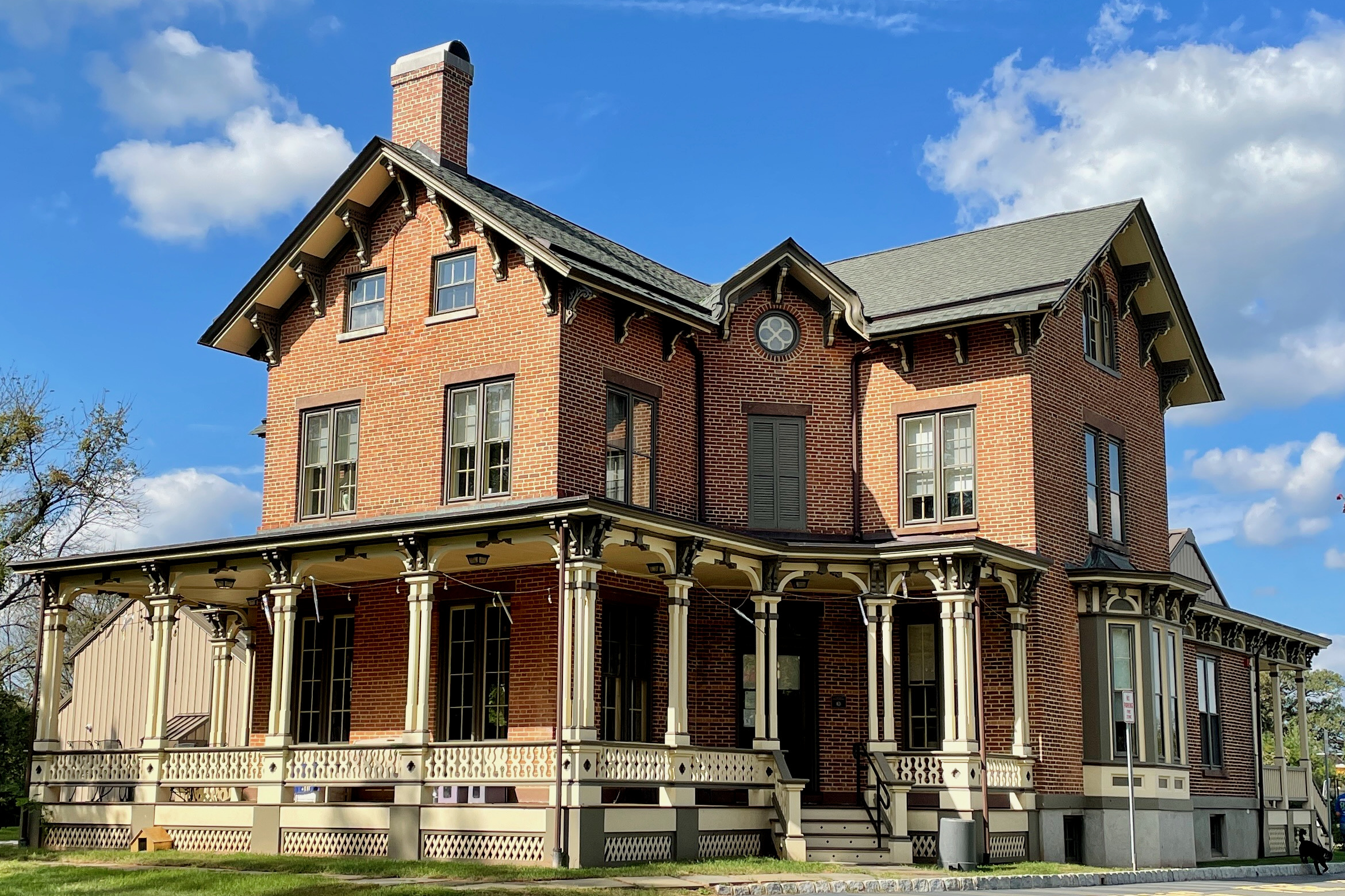
- James Van Zandt Mansion
- Location: Georgetown-Franklin Turnpike/CR 518, Great Road/CR 601, and Mountain View Road
- Area: 336 acres (136 ha)
- Architectural style: Colonial Revival, Mid 19th Century Revival, Late Victorian
- NRHP reference No.: 88000632
- NJRHP No.: 2538

Significant dates
- Added to NRHP: December 7, 1990
- Designated NJRHP: February 8, 1988

The Blawenburg Historic District is a 336-acre (136 ha) historic district encompassing the community along Georgetown-Franklin Turnpike/County Route 518, Great Road/County Route 601, and Mountain View Road. It was added to the National Register of Historic Places on December 7, 1990, for its significance in agriculture, architecture, religion and exploration/settlement. The district includes 46 contributing buildings, two contributing structures and two contributing sites.

The Reformed Dutch Church of Blawenburg was added individually to the NRHP in 1985 and contributes to the district. The Blawenburg Tavern, also known as the William M. Griggs House, was built c. 1815. The village schoolhouse was built in 1853. The William Sherman House, built c. 1856, features Greek Revival and Italianate style. The 1860s James Van Zandt Mansion is a Victorian style Italian Villa.

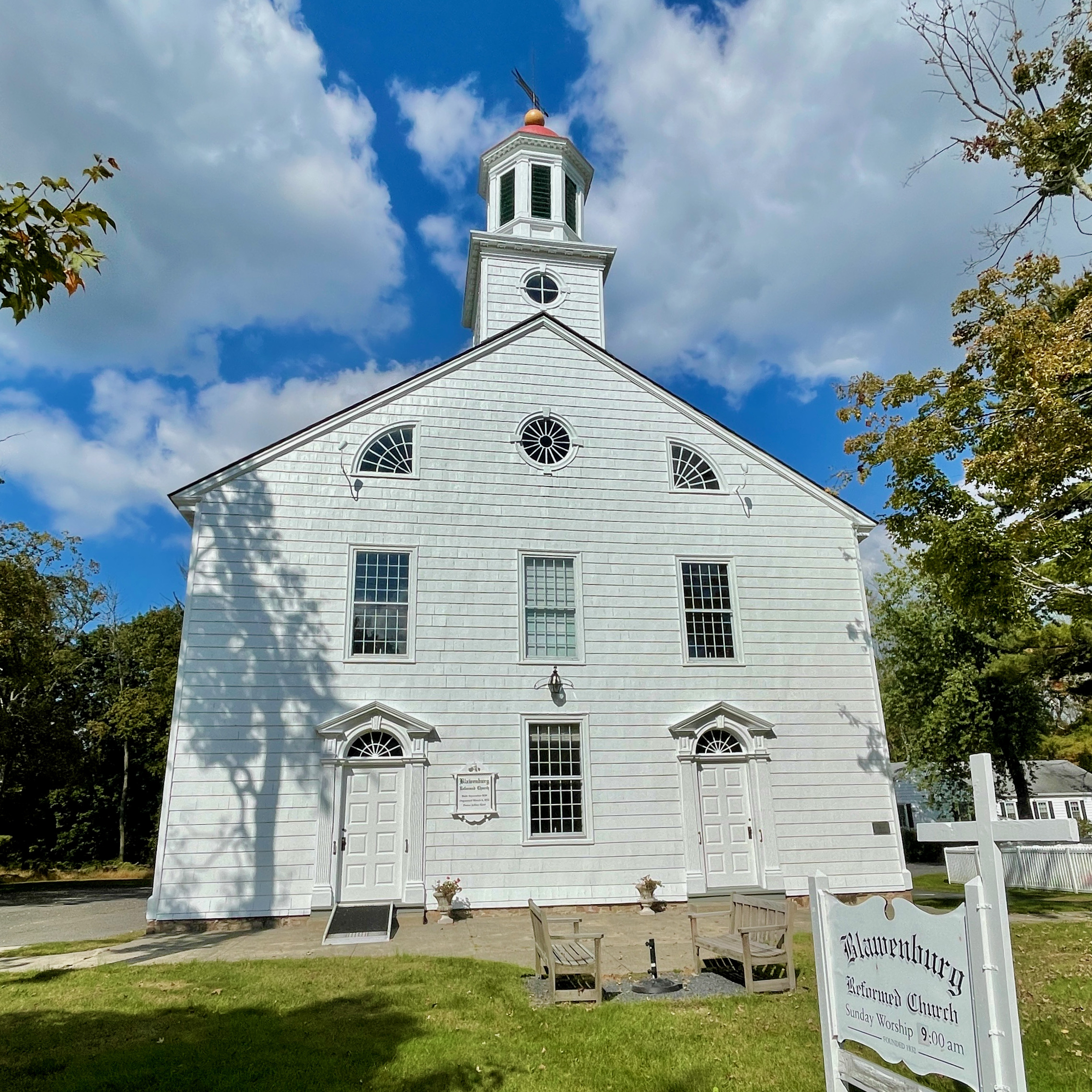
Blawenburg Reformed Church

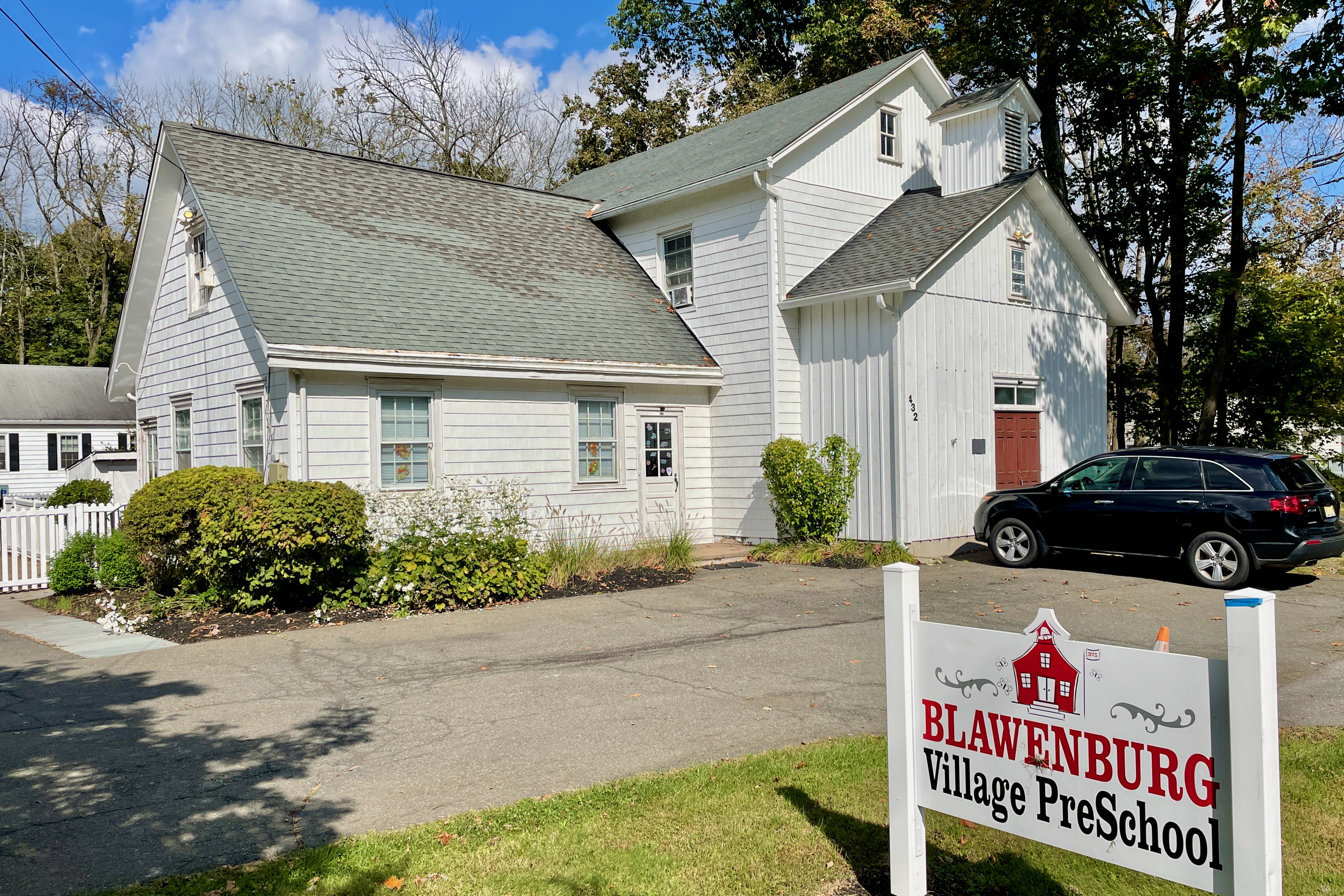
Blawenburg Village Preschool

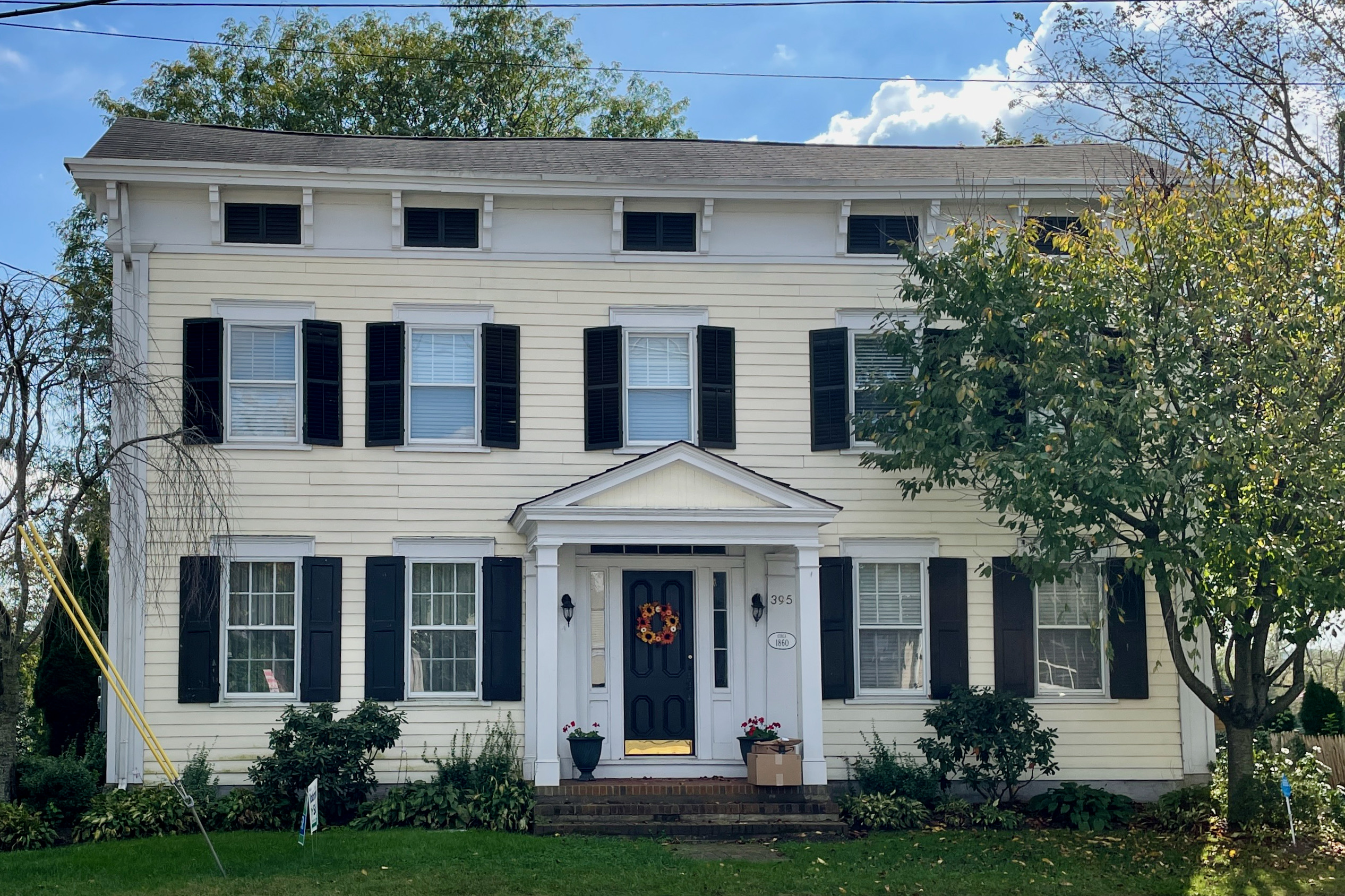
William Sherman House

== See also ==
- National Register of Historic Places listings in Somerset County, New Jersey
