= Dirk Van der Hoff =

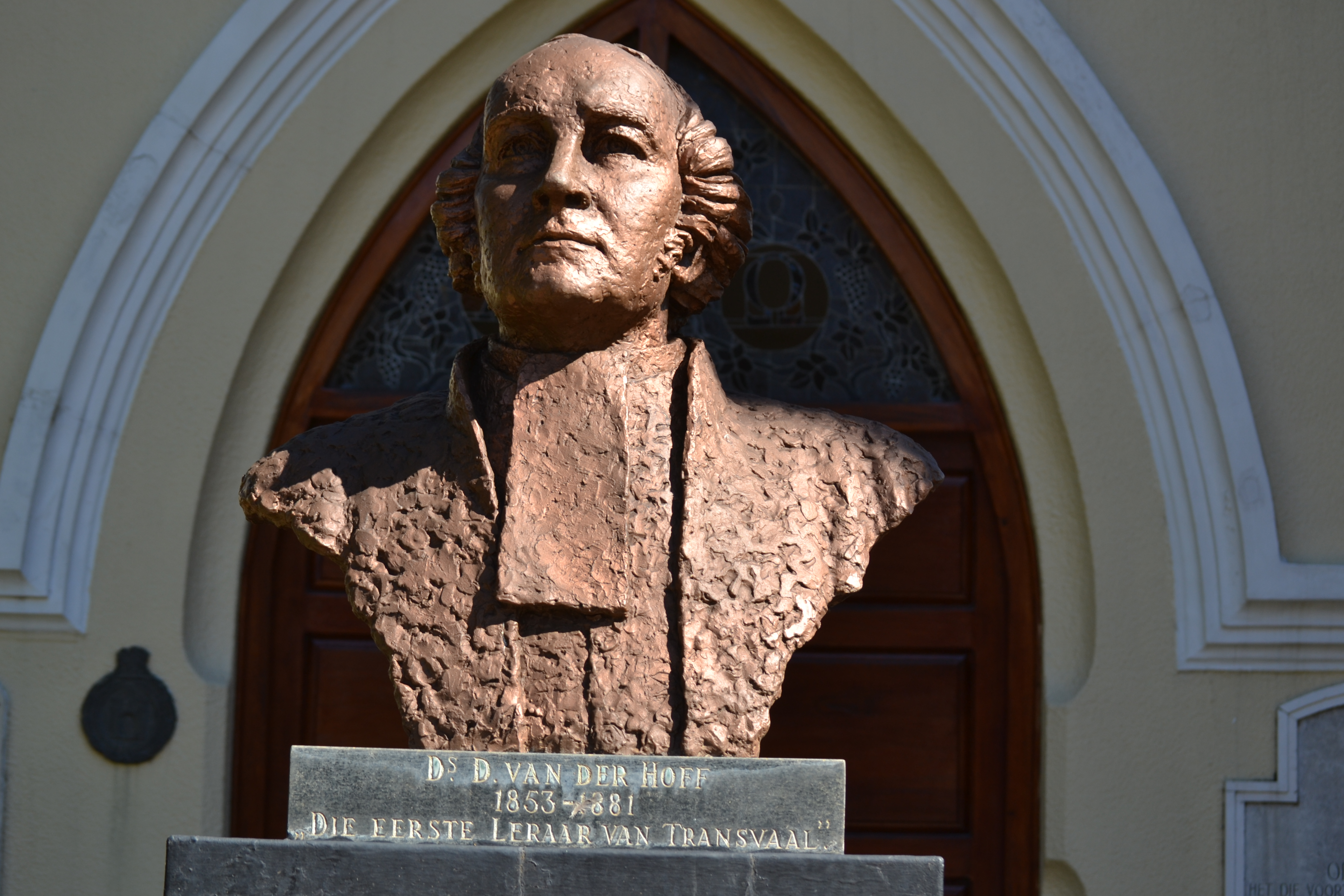
- Van der Hoff's bust at the Reformed Church Complex in Potchefstroom
- Church: Nederduitsch Hervormde Kerk (NHK)

Personal details
- Born: 2 September 1814 Dordrecht, Netherlands
- Died: 9 October 1881 (aged 67) Potchefstroom, South Africa
- Denomination: Dutch Reformed Church
- Spouse: Anna Maria van Otterloo

Dirk Van der Hoff (2 September 1814 in Dordrecht, Netherlands, – 9 October 1881 in Potchefstroom, South Africa) was minister of the Nederduitsch Hervormde Kerk, one of the Dutch Reformed Churches in South Africa.

== Early life ==
The second son of a shopkeeper, he went to the Latin school in Dordrecht and became a theological student at Leiden in 1833. His training was influenced by the newer, supernaturalistic theological trend. In May 1840, he passed the B.D. examination and was admitted to the ministry. He was never offered a post in the Netherlands, which at the time had a glut of young preachers.

On 25 May 1845 he married Anna Maria van Otterloo in Dordrecht, fathered one daughter (in 1878) and two sons.

While Van der Hoff waited for a call he undertook a number of journeys abroad. He considered emigrating to Cape Colony or Natal as a minister. When he met Professor U. G. Lauts, who was looking for clergymen and teachers for the Voortrekkers, he made up his mind. In 1852 Lauts accepted Van der Hoff as a clergyman for five years for the Volksraad of the Afrikaans Hollanders, north of the Vaal River in South Africa.

== Early years in South Africa ==
After Lauts had helped Van der Hoff to find passage money to Cape Town, he and his wife reached their destination in November 1852. He was welcomed by J. J. H. Smuts, editor of De Zuid-Afrikaan, who was his host during the greater part of his stay at the Cape. He was admitted to the church, though he refused to take an oath of allegiance to British authorities. While waiting for passage to the Transvaal, he held services in the Groote Kerk, Cape Town, in Wynberg, and in the Lutheran church.

In April 1853 Van der Hoff, his wife and newborn daughter left for the Transvaal via Natal. In Natal Van der Hoff preached at Pietermaritzburg and Ladysmith and also received an invitation to become the minister of New Germany. In May 1853, he arrived at Potchefstroom. He was thus the first minister of religion in the Transvaal.

The disorganization and division of the Transvaal community without any regular public authority and only primitive communications, complicated his work enormously.

With regards to the relation of the Transvaal church to the authority in Cape Town, Van der Hoff initially advocated this affiliation of the independent Transvaal congregations with the Cape N.G. Kerk. Nevertheless he did identify himself with the struggle for an independent church in the Transvaal Republic. The General Synod recognized Van der H. as legitimately ordained with the whole of the Transvaal as his field.

Due to various arguments over church government, others in the N.G. Kerk disliked for Van der Hoff, resulting in multiple antagonistic meetings with him and the N. H. Kerk. Van der Hoff's activities were rendered still more difficult by a second church schism when a number of members broke away in 1859 and established the Gereformeerde Kerk.

== Later career ==
Van der Hoff visited Potchefstroom and Marico regularly, and established congregations at Suikerbosrand, Onder-Vaalrivier (roughly the present Wolmaransstad, Bloemhof, Makwassie and Christiana), Pretoria, Draakberg (in the vicinity of the present Volksrust and Wakkerstroom), Klerksdorp, Losberg and Rustenburg. This meant that he was almost continually on the move, mostly by ox-waggon, in often inhospitable parts of the Southern Africa. On his journeys he twice fractured an arm and once fractured a leg, and for a time had to hold services while seated.

Van der Hoff's advice was sought on nearly every aspect of the then unregulated society. In 1853 the Volksraad had adopted the 'Van der Hoff rules of procedure' for education, in terms of which the church was to continue to supervise education. After the adoption of the Transvaal constitution (1857) in which education was entrusted to the state, Van der Hoff was chair-man of the Board of Education until 1867.

On the political level he also contributed towards stability. For instance, he tendered his resignation in protest in 1855, when the Volksraad rejected a draft constitution, but withdrew it when the constitutional bill was adopted in principle. With the adoption of the constitution in January 1857, the Vierkleur, designed by Van der Hoff and his brother, was also adopted as the flag of the Transvaal Republic. At Potchefstroom, Rustenburg and Pretoria Van der Hoff organized the religious part of the ceremonies marking the hoisting of the flag. For the occasion he also wrote a "Vlaggelied" which can be considered an early national anthem.

The adoption of the constitution of 1857 meant that the Nederduitsch Hervormde Kerk became the state church. However, Van der Hoff refused to submit to state control. He also brought about order in the Church, although a first church law, drafted by him in 1857, was not accepted by the Volksraad.

When, in 1861, A. J. Begemann became the minister at Pretoria, G. W. Smits went to Rustenburg, and, in 1864, N. J. van Warmelo arrived at Soutpansberg, the scope of Van der Hoff's work was reduced. However, with the Church disputes caused by the Rev. F. Lion Cachet in 1865 and later, he found himself once again in the arena. He was also involved in a public dispute with the Rev. J. L. Jooste, the N.G. Kerk minister at Potchefstroom, from December 1868.

== Late career ==
In 1878 the twenty-fifth anniversary of Van der Hoff's ministry was celebrated in Potchefstroom. The public interest and the address presented by the commission of the General Synod emphasized the affection and regard he received from those who knew him. Under his guidance, the N.H. Kerk had, by 1878, grown into a prosperous Church community of 19,500, served by seven ministers.

The Rev. N. J. van Warmelo conducted his funeral service at Potchefstroom. In October 1920 the church council of the local N.H. Kerk congregation restored his grave and erected a suitable monument upon it.

A bronze bust of Van der H. by Coert Steynberg is in the Van der Hoff building, Pretoria, and another is in the possession of the N.H. Kerk, Potchefstroom. There are portraits in Engelbrecht (1942, infra) and in the N.H. Kerk Archives, Pretoria.

== Bibliography ==
- Chidester, David, et al. (1997). Christianity in South Africa: An Annotated Bibliography. Westport: Greenwood.
- Hattersley, A. F. (1969). An Illustrated Social History of South Africa. Rotterdam: Balkema.
- (1960). Our First Half-Century: 1910-1960; Golden Jubilee of the Union of South Africa. Johannesburg: Da Gama Publications.
- Patterson, Sheila (2004). The Last Trek: A Study of the Boer People and the Afrikaner Nation. London: Routledge.
