= Reformed Dutch Church of Blawenburg =

Historic site in Somerset County, New Jersey

- U.S. National Register of Historic Places
- U.S. Historic district – Contributing property
- New Jersey Register of Historic Places
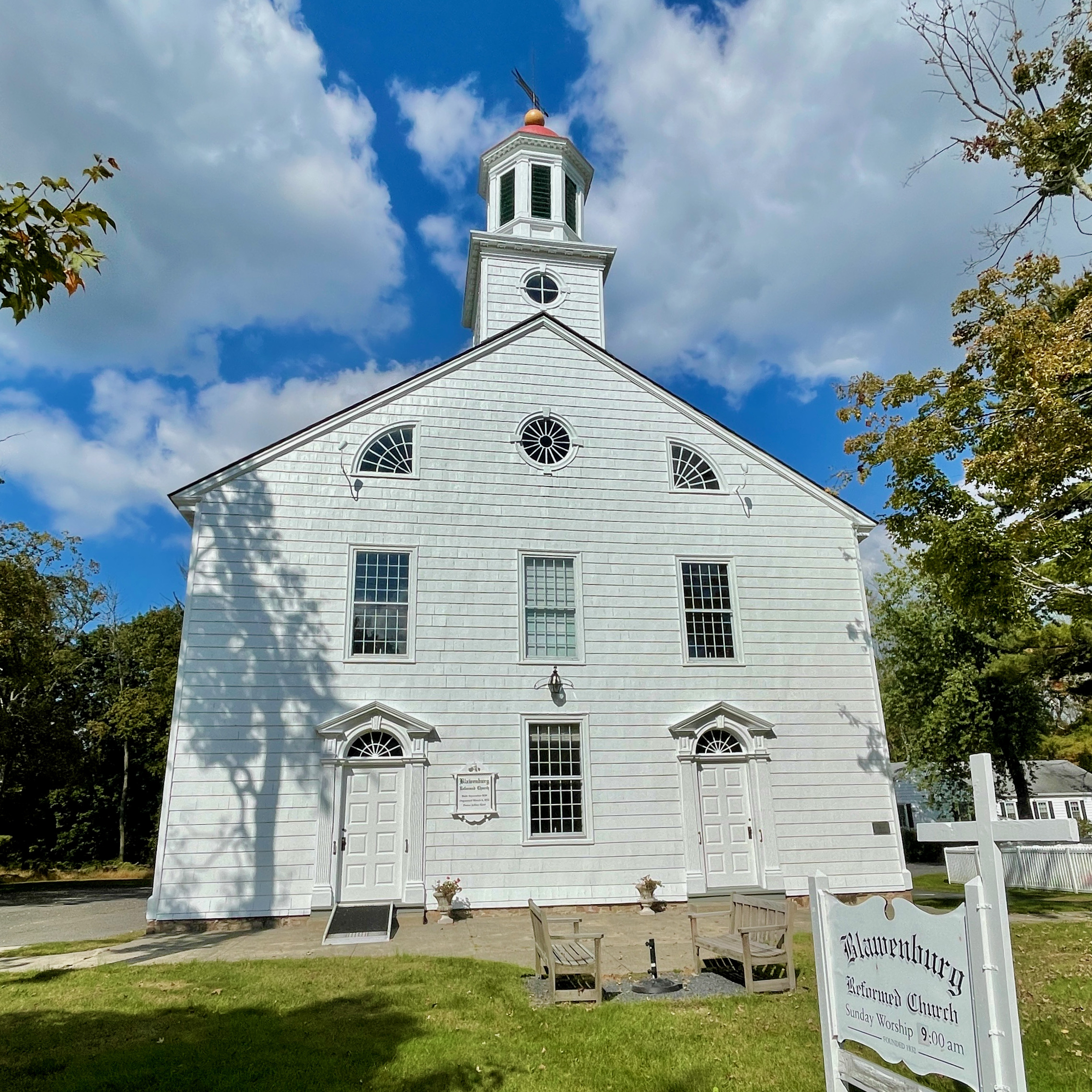
- Blawenburg Reformed Church in 2021

- Location within Somerset County, New Jersey Location within New Jersey Location within the United States
- Location: 424 County Route 518, Blawenburg, New Jersey
- Coordinates: 40°24′30″N 74°41′57″W
- Area: 2 acres (0.81 ha)
- Built: 1831
- Built by: Richard Brown
- Architectural style: Georgian
- Part of: Blawenburg Historic District (ID88000632)
- NRHP reference No.: 85002004
- NJRHP No.: 2537

Significant dates
- Added to NRHP: September 5, 1985
- Designated CP: December 7, 1990
- Designated NJRHP: July 22, 1985

Reformed Dutch Church of Blawenburg, now known as Blawenburg Reformed Church, is a historic church at 424 County Route 518 in the Blawenburg section of Montgomery Township in Somerset County, New Jersey. The Blawenburg Reformed Church Cemetery is located on County Route 601 near CR 518. The church was added to the National Register of Historic Places on July 22, 1985 for its significance in architecture and religion. It was added as a contributing property to the Blawenburg Historic District in 1990.

== History ==
Construction of the church building started in 1830 and was completed in 1831. Richard Brown was the chief carpenter. It was then known as the Second Dutch Reformed Church at Harlingen. It then became the Reformed Dutch Church at Blawenburg on March 4, 1832. A schoolhouse was built in 1853 by the church. It is now the village preschool. The church cemetery is west of the church on land partly donated by John Van Zandt in 1859.

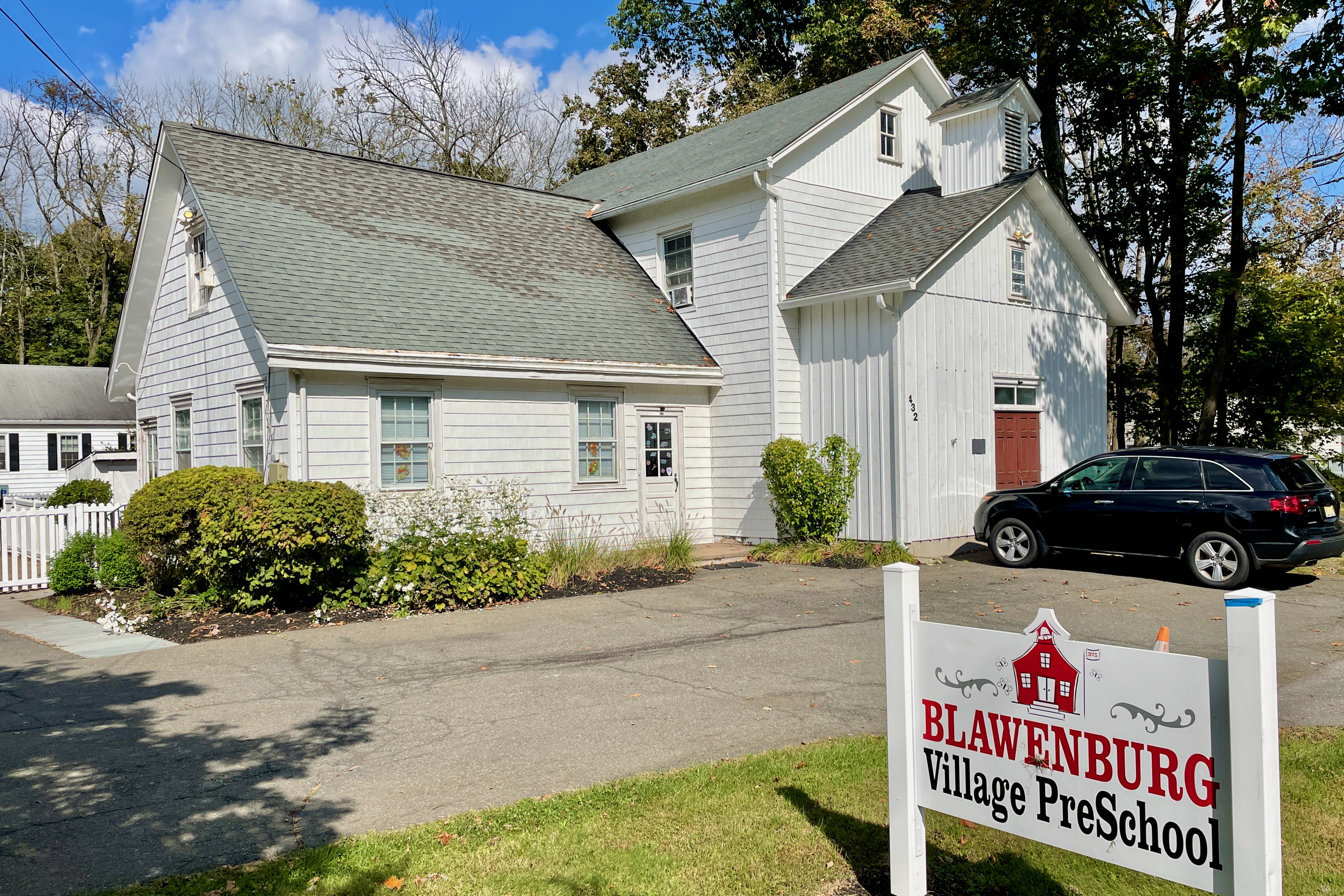
Blawenburg Village Preschool

== Description ==
The church is a two story white building, an example of late Georgian architecture. It has a bell tower with a feather-shaped weathervane on top. The facade features an oculus and two pie-shaped windows. There are two entrance doors.

== Notable burials ==
- David F. Weeks (July 31, 1874 – March 15, 1929), football player, coach, and doctor
- John Allan Wyeth (October 24, 1894 – May 11, 1981), World War I veteran, war poet, and painter

== See also ==
- National Register of Historic Places listings in Somerset County, New Jersey
