= Dutch Reformed Church (Harrodsburg, Kentucky) =

Historic church in Kentucky, United States

- U.S. National Register of Historic Places
- Location within Kentucky Location within the United States
- Nearest city: Harrodsburg, Kentucky
- Coordinates: 37°43′27″N 84°51′48″W
- Area: 3.5 acres (1.4 ha)
- Built: 1800
- NRHP reference No.: 73000819
- Added to NRHP: February 16, 1973

The Dutch Reformed Church in Harrodsburg, Kentucky, also known as Old Mud Meeting House, is a historic Reformed church.

It was built in 1800 and is an oak log building which was the first Low Dutch Reformed Church west of the Alleghenies. It was constructed of vertical logs with mud and straw panels in between. Weatherboard on the exterior and plastering on the interior was added in 1850 and later. It is about 46 by 34 feet (14 m × 10 m) in dimension.

It was added to the National Register in 1973.
