= Flatlands Dutch Reformed Church =

Church in Brooklyn, New York

- U.S. National Register of Historic Places
- New York State Register of Historic Places
- New York City Landmark
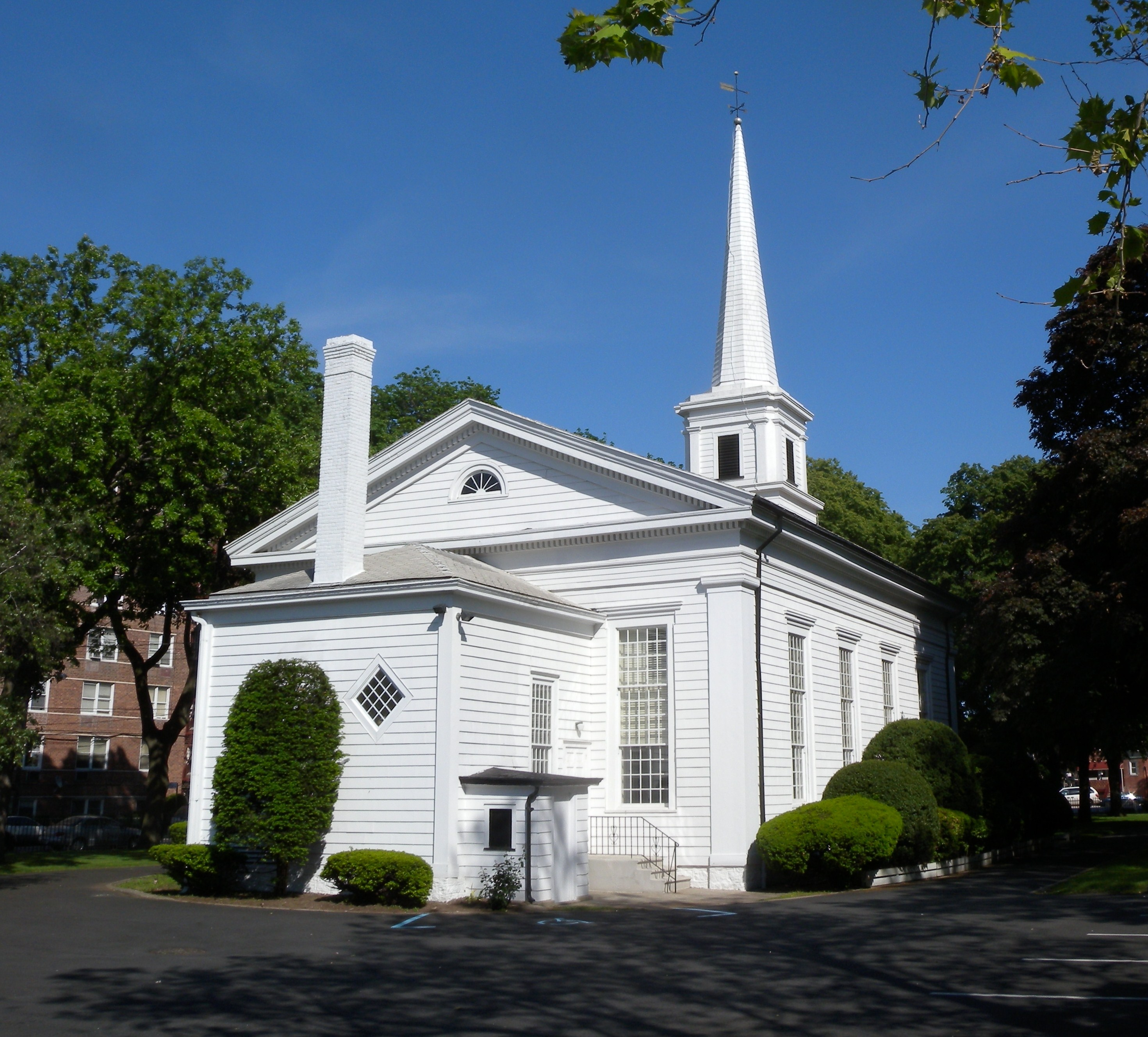

- Location within New York City Location within New York Location within the United States
- Location: Kings Hwy. and E. 40th St., Brooklyn, New York
- Coordinates: 40°37′26″N 73°56′13″W
- Area: 2.5 acres (1.0 ha)
- Built: 1660
- Architect: Eldert, Henry; Et al.
- Architectural style: Greek Revival
- NRHP reference No.: 79001588
- NYSRHP No.: 04701.000156
- NYCL No.: 0177

Significant dates
- Added to NRHP: August 30, 1979
- Designated NYSRHP: June 23, 1980
- Designated NYCL: July 19, 1966

Flatlands Dutch Reformed Church, also known as Flatlands Reformed Church, is a historic Dutch Reformed church at Kings Highway and East 40th Street in the Flatlands neighborhood of Brooklyn, New York City. The complex consists of the church, administration building, and cemetery. The congregation was founded in 1654. The church was built in 1848 in the Greek Revival style. The Greek Revival administration building was constructed in 1904; it was enlarged in the 1920s. The cemetery contains about 1,500 burials dating to 1660.

It was listed on the National Register of Historic Places in 1979.
