= Groote Kerk, Cape Town =

Groote Kerk
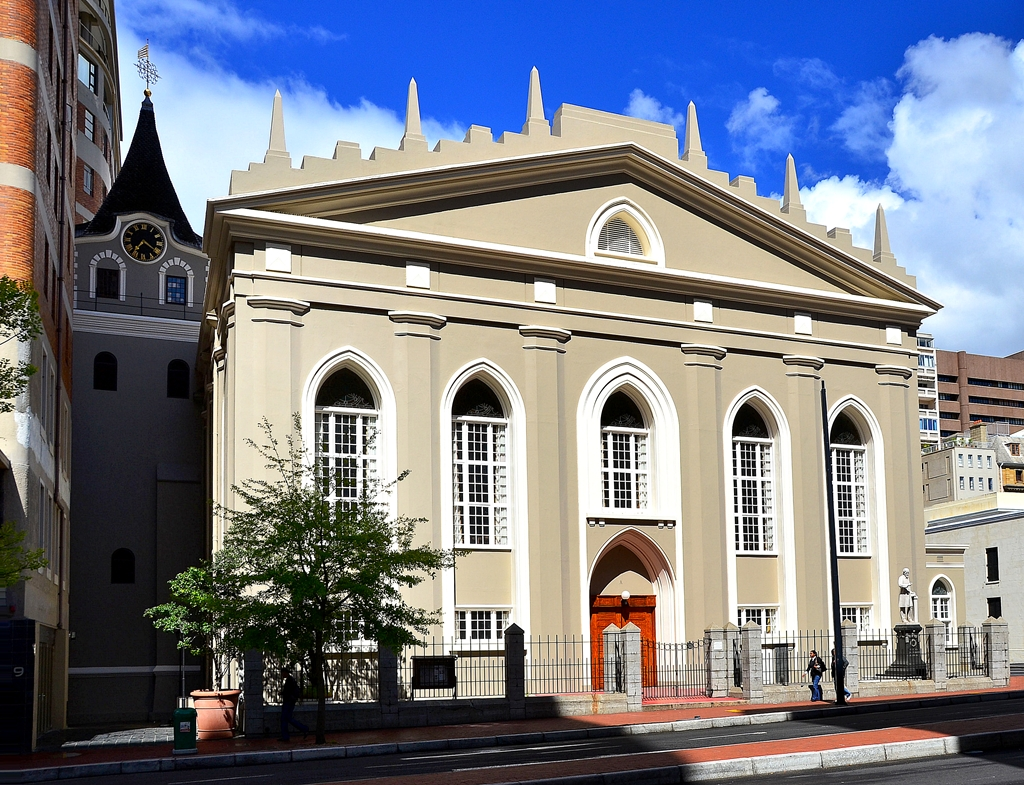
- Groote Kerk
- Groote Kerk
- 33.9248°S 18.4209°E
- Location: Cape Town
- Country: South Africa
- Denomination: Nederduits Gereformeerde Kerk

History
- Founded: 1678

Architecture
- Functional status: Church
- Style: Neoclassical

The Groote Kerk (Afrikaans and Dutch for "Great Church") is a Dutch Reformed church in Cape Town, South Africa. The church is South Africa's oldest place of Christian worship. The first church on this land was built in 1678. Willem Adriaan van der Stel laid the cornerstone for the church. It was replaced by the present building in 1841 built by Herman Schuette and the original tower was retained. The pulpit is the work of Anton Anreith and the carpenter Jacob Graaff, and was inaugurated on 29 November 1789. The Groote Kerk lays claim to housing South Africa's largest church organ, which was installed in 1954.

== Background ==
At first the colonists, landing beginning in 1652 at the Cape of Good Hope, relied on a lay preacher (sieketrooster, Dutch for "comforter of the ill") named Willem Wylant. He regularly preached in the Fort, taught children, and evangelized to natives. The first communion was held on 12 May 1652 by a visiting pastor, the Rev. Johannes Backerus, while the first baptism was held on 24 August 1653. Other sieketroosters who served the community were Pieter van der Stael, Ernestus Back, and Jan Joris Graaf.

== Early pastors ==
The small congregation longed for its own preacher, until the Lord's Seventeen of the Dutch East India Company in Amsterdam decided to send the first full-time pastor to the Cape. He was Joan van Arckel, who landed at Table Bay on 18 August 1665. During his tenure, he used a wooden church that was supplied in December of that same year with a stone gable and floor. In 1672, services began to be held in "De Kat" (Dutch for "The Cat"), a section of the Castle of Good Hope, since the foundations of the first church building would not be laid until 1678. On 6 January 1704 the first stone church opened with a service by the Rev. Petrus Kalden. Construction cost £2,200.

The first Afrikaner (i.e. local-born) pastor of the congregation was the Rev. Petrus van der Spuy (1746-1752). During the tenure of the Rev. Johannes Petrus Serrurier (1760-1802), the 1704 church was slated for expansion. This was completed at a cost of 4,000 and opened in 1781. The current pulpit, made from the best Indian wood at the cost of £708 by the sculptor Anton Anreith, was unveiled in November 1789. Later, the building was damaged, and the current Groote Kerk was opened in 1841.

One of the most famous pastors in the congregation's history was the Rev. Abraham Faure, who served the congregation from 1822 to 1867. He showed particular interest in education, and his efforts were instrumental to founding the first local Sunday school in 1844.

Another famous 19th-century pastor was Dr. William Robertson, who came here from Swellendam.

== Large church, small congregation ==
Some of the neighborhoods got their own ministers and therefore separate congregations: Three Anchor Bay Reformed Church (in Sea Point), Observatory Reformed Church, Woodstock Reformed Church, and Maitland Reformed Church, while the Table Mountain Reformed Church was spun off from the Tamboerskloof Reformed Church (also called the New Church). As Afrikaners have left the area, the daughter congregations have tended to decline in number. Woodstock latter dissolved, and in 2007, Three Anchor Bay, Observatory, Maitland, and Tamboerskloof had only 659 members among all four congregations combined, down to 646 in 2008, compared to 1,816 for them plus Woodstock in 1985.

In 1952, celebrated as the congregation's tricentennial (later, the foundation was more correctly rendered as 1665), there were more than 2,000 members served by three pastors in the mother church. In 1979, there were still 1,971 adult members, but by 1995 that number had shrunk to 1,403, and by 2009 it reached a mere 810. At the end of 2014 it had declined to 585.

== List of ministers ==
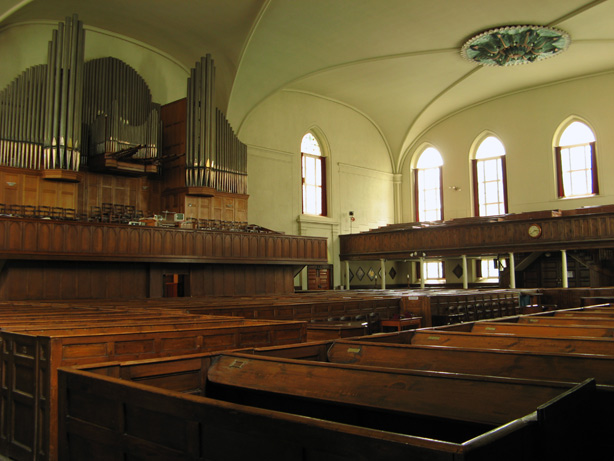
The interior

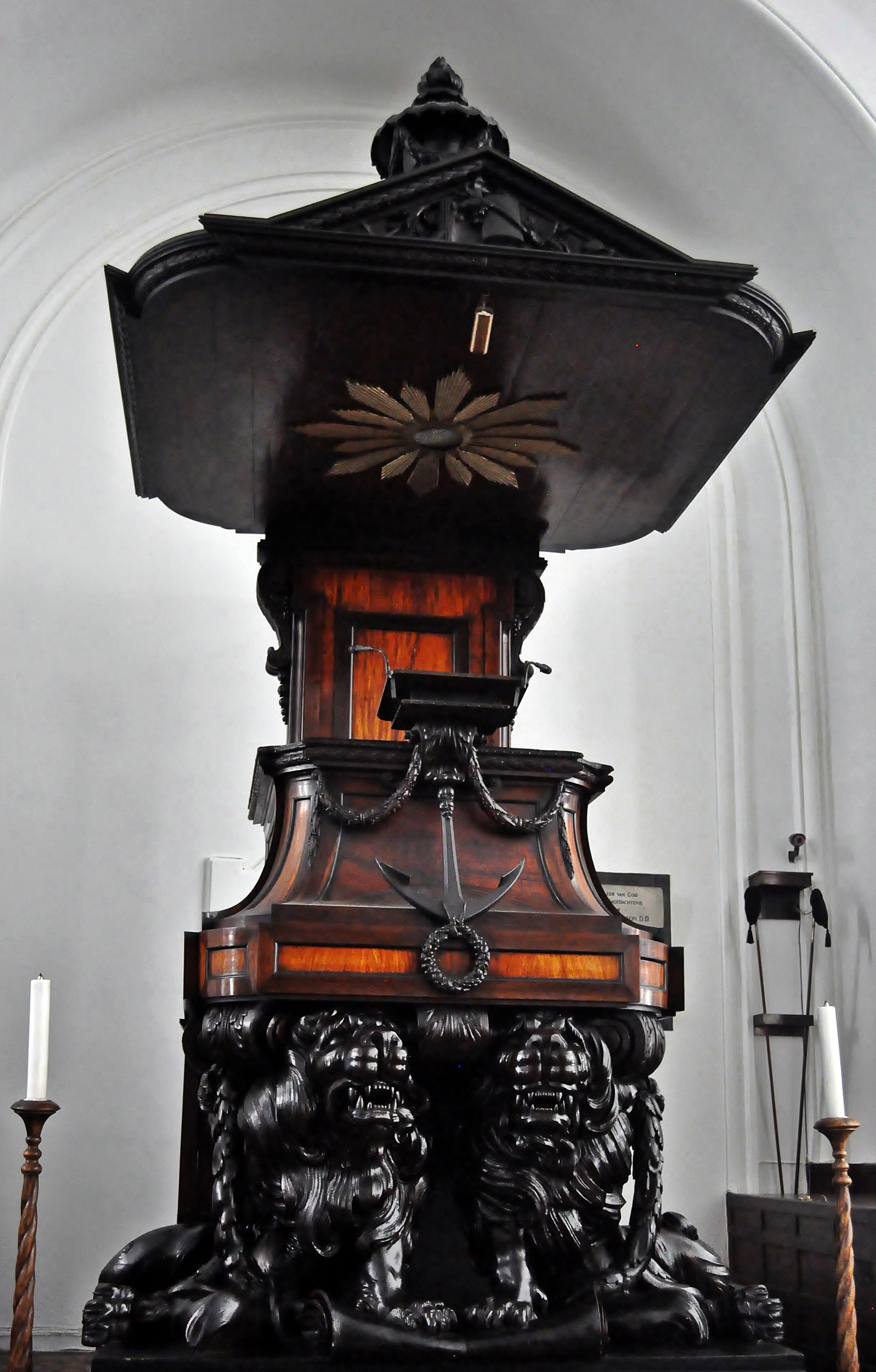
The pulpit

1. Joan van Arckel, 1665 - 12 January 1666 (died in office)
2. Johannes de Vooght, 26 February to 23 November 1666
3. Petrus Wachtendorp, November 1666 - 15 December 1667 (died in office)
4. Adriaan de Vooght, 1667 - 1674
5. Rudolpus Meerlandt, 1674 - 1675
6. Petrus Hulsenaar, 1675 - 1677
7. Johan Frederick Stumphius, May 1678 (not on the official church list)
8. Johannes Overney, 1678 - 1687
9. Johannes van Andel, 1687 - 1689 (returned to Batavia)
10. Leonardus Terwoldt, 1689 - 1695 (returned to Batavia)
11. Hercules van Loon, 1695 - 1697
12. Petrus Kalden, 1697 - 1708 (returned to Holland)
13. Engelbertus Franciscus le Boucq, 1707 - 1708 (not on the official church list)
14. Johannes Godefridus D'Ailly, 1708 - 1726
15. Lambertus Slicher, 1723 - 1725
16. Hendrik Beck, 1726 - 1731
17. Franciscus le Seuer, 1729 - 1746
18. Henricus Cock, 1732 - 1743
19. Ruardus van Cloppenburgh, 1746 - 1748 (returned to Holland, died in 1751)
20. Petrus van der Spuy, 1746 - 1752 (first South-African-born pastor)
21. Henricus Kronenburg, 1752 - 1779 (27 years; retired; died the latter year)
22. Gerhardus Croeser, 1754 - 1755
23. Christiaan Benjamin Voltelen, 1755 - 1758
24. Johannes Frederik Bode, 1758 - 1760
25. Johannes Petrus Serrurier, 1760 - 1802 (47 years; retired; died 3 February 1819)
26. Christiaan Fleck, 1781 - 1822 (41 years)
27. Meent Borcherds, 1785 - 1786
28. Helperus Ritzema van Lier, 1786 - 1793
29. Abraham Kuys, 1794 - 1799
30. Johan Heinrich von Manger, 1802 - 1839 (37 years; retired; died 2 May 1842)
31. Johannes Christoffel Berrange, 1817 - 1827
32. Dr. Abraham Faure, 1822 - 1867 (45 years)
33. Johannes Spijker, 1834 - 1864 (30 years; retired; died 21 May 1865)
34. Stephanus Petrus Heyns, 1839 - 17 September 1873 (36 years; died in office)
35. Dr. Andrew Murray, 1864 - 1871
36. Georg Stegmann jr., 1867 - 1880
37. Dr. William Robertson, 1872 - 1879 (retired; died on 24 November 1879)
38. Gilles van de Wall, 1874 - 1875
39. Anton Daniël Lückhoff, 1875 - 1886 (New Church, later Tamboerskloof)
40. Dr. Johannes Jacobus Kotzé, 1880 - 1899
41. Abraham Isaac Steytler, 1881 - 1915 (34 years; retired; died 17 December 1922)
42. Christoffel Frederic Jacobus Muller, 1887 - 1890 (New Church, later Tamboerskloof)
43. Adriaan Moorrees, 1892 - 1895
44. Charles Morgan (South Africa), 1893 - 1896 (Robben Island)
45. Francis Xavier Roome, 1895 - 1937 (Sea Point, 42 years)
46. Zacharia Johannes de Beer, 1895 - 1923 (Woodstock, until foundation of separate congregation, 28 years)
47. Louis Hugo, 1897 - 1907 (Robben Island)
48. Dr. Johannes Petrus van Heerden, 1899 - 1935 (36 years)
49. Dr. Johannes du Plessis, 1899 - 1903 (Sea Point)
50. Dr. Barend Johannes Haarhoff, 1905 - 1912 (Maitland, until foundation of separate congregation)
51. Gerrit Johannes du Plessis, 1906 - 1912 (Observatory, until foundation of separate congregation)
52. Johannes Stephanus Hauman, 1908 - 1918 (retired; died 24 July 1925; Robben Island)
53. Daniel Gerhardus Malan, 1918 - 1921
54. Pieter Basson Ackermann, 1918 - 1922 (Robben Island)
55. Daniel Stephanus Burger Joubert, 1921 - 1925
56. Willem Ferdinand Louw, 1922 - 1929 (Robben Island; retired; died 16 August 1933)
57. Dr. Abraham van der Merwe, 1926 - 1966 (40 years)
58. Jacobus Delarey Conradie, 1936 - 1967 (31 years)
59. Pieter du Toit, 1938 - 1943
60. Theunis Christoffel Botha Stofberg, 1940 – 1944 (student pastor)
61. Johannes Gerhardus Janse van Vuuren, 1945 - 1954, 7 December 1963 - 9 April 1986 (32 years)
62. Willem Adolf Landman, 1958 - 29 January 1979 (director of the Information Bureau; 21 years)
63. Petrus Andries van Zyl, 1958 - 1960 (traveling missionary)
64. Johannes Mattheus Delport, 1960 - 1963
65. Jacobus van der Westhuizen, 1968 - 1997 (29 years)
66. Erasmus Adriaan van Niekerk, 1972 - 1975
67. Abraham Johannes Prins, 1975 - 1981
68. Petrus Johannes Botes, 26 April 1981 - 2009 (28 years)
69. Gideon de Wit, 2003 - 2015
70. Johan Taute van Rooyen, 2011 - 2018
71. Riaan de Villiers, 2014–present
72. Michiel Strauss, 2019–present

== Bibliography ==
- Maeder, Rev. G.A. and Zinn, Christian. 1917. Ons Kerk Album. Cape Town: Ons Kerk Album Maatschappij Bpkt.
- Olivier, rev. P.L. (compiler). 1952. Ons gemeentelike feesalbum. Cape Town/Pretoria: N.G. Kerk-uitgewers.
