= Uniting Reformed Church in Southern Africa =

Reformed Christian denomination in South Africa

- Classification: Protestant
- Theology: Reformed
- Polity: Presbyterian
- Associations: World Communion of Reformed Churches
- Region: South Africa, Namibia and Lesotho
- Origin: 1994; 32 years ago South Africa
- Branched from: Dutch Reformed Church
- Congregations: 683
- Members: 1,230 000

The Uniting Reformed Church in Southern Africa (Afrikaans: Verenigende Gereformeerde Kerk in Suid-Afrika) is a Reformed Christian Church in South Africa, Namibia and Lesotho. It is affiliated with the World Communion of Reformed Churches.

== History ==
In 1652, the Dutch formed a halfway station at the Cape, which was approximately halfway between the Netherlands and the Dutch East Indies, and introduced slavery by whites.

Various foreign mission organisations started working in South Africa, which led to the formation of a number of denominations amongst those people who otherwise would have been excluded from the main churches, largely over issues of race.

This process motivated the Nederduits Gereformeerde Kerk (NGK) in South Africa to start its own independent mission work.

In 1857, the NGK synod decided to have separate services for coloured (mixed race) members.

A separate church, the Dutch Reformed Mission Church (DRMC) was formed in 1881.

For blacks, the Dutch Reformed Church in Africa (DRCA) was formed in 1963.

In 1974, the synod of the DRCA decided in favour of church unity. In 1978 the DRMC decided likewise.

In 1986, the Belhar Confession – with its strong emphasis on unity, reconciliation and justice – was formulated and adopted by the DRMC.

In 1994, the DRMC and the DRCA united to form the Uniting Reformed Church in Southern Africa (URCSA).

=== Road to unification ===
The formal unification of the Dutch Reformed Church in Africa (DRCA) and the Dutch Reformed Mission Church (DRMC) in 1994 to form the Uniting Reformed Church in Southern Africa (URCSA) followed a lengthy and complex process toward church unity.

The Dutch formed a halfway station at the Cape in 1652, where like all contemporary African and European cultures they practiced slavery. They started a school for slaves, with the purpose of transferring the Dutch language and culture. To encourage slaves to learn the Dutch language and prayers, they were rewarded with tobacco and brandy.

The Dutch East India Company, as a matter of policy, had all their slaves baptised. The Dutch Reformed Church (DRC) of the time had no organised mission activity, with the result that the baptism of slaves were left to the wilfulness of their masters. Baptised slaves also did not necessarily become members of the church.

In 1737 Georg Schmidt from the Moravian Church came to Cape Town to work amongst the Khoikhoi of the Overberg. Pressurised by the Cape church, he was forced to leave for Germany again after seven years. In the course of time various mission organisations from overseas started working in South Africa, which led to the formation of a number of denominations amongst those people who else would have been excluded from the church.

This process motivated the DRC to start its own independent mission work. This new development started at the church's first synod of 1824, when it decided to allow missionaries within its own ranks. This was clearly a move to get control over the way in which mission work would be done in years to follow. "The Afrikaner abhorred the liberal views of equality, freedom and the social integration of many missionaries (from the foreign mission societies)". Although at its 1829 synod the DRC formally rejected discrimination on the basis of skin colour, it did not mean that in practice people of colour were not discriminated against, particularly at worship services and holy communion.

The DRC synod's decision of 1857 about separate services for coloured members "because of the weakness of some", has become notorious. The next logical step was the formation of a separate church. In 1881 representatives of five mission congregations assembled in Wellington near Cape Town for the first meeting of the DRMC. The DRC reserved the right to veto all decisions by this newly formed church. Also all its buildings had to be transferred on the DRC's name. The DRC decided to divide its mission work into a "home" and "foreign" mission. The first covered the Cape region, the second all the other provinces of South Africa, including Namibia. In each province separate churches for blacks and coloureds were formed. The Free State had its own mission church already in 1910.

In the Cape a separate "Dutch Reformed Bantu Church" was formed in 1951. All the coloured congregations eventually joined the DRMC, and the black congregations the DRCA. In 1974 the synod of the DRCA decided in favour of church unity. In 1978 the DRMC decided likewise. It took another 16 years for that ideal to be fulfilled. In the process, the Belhar Confession with its emphasis on unity, reconciliation and justice was formulated and adopted in 1986. This is still very much the motivating power by which the URCSA today lives.

== Statistics ==
In 2025, the Church had 758 congregations and 496,744 members.

== Structure ==
A Uniting Reformed Church in Soweto, Johannesburg in 2026

The Church consists of hundreds of congregations, these congregations belong to the regional presbytery and several presbyteries form a Synod. The Uniting Reformed Church in Southern Africa consist of seven regional synods, namely Namibia, Northern synod, Southern synod (The whole Gauteng except Tshwane and parts of North & Mpumalanga), Phororo (Northern Cape), Cape, Kwazulu-Natal, Free State and Lesotho. Each region has its own moderamen, and every congregation is represented at these synods. Congregations are grouped together in presbyteries. At the general synod level congregations are only represented through their presbyteries. The general synod determines the Church's policy, and the regional synods see to it that these policies are reflected in their various activities.

== Beliefs ==
=== Marriage ===
A 2018 resolution allows blessings of same-sex marriage.

== Achterbergh Declaration ==
From 6 to 8 November 2006, 127 representatives of the Reformed Church in Africa, The Uniting Reformed Church in Southern Africa and Nederduits Gereformeerde Kerk met at Achterbergh near Krugersdorp to discuss the reunification of the family of DRC churches and how this can be realized.

The Dutch Reformed Churches Union Act Repeal Act 46 of 2008 lists one of its objectives as to 'remove obstacles in the unification process of the Verenigde Gereformeerde Kerk, Reformed Church of Africa and the Dutch Reformed Churches without legislative intervention.'

== Doctrine ==
=== Creeds ===
- Apostle Creed
- Nicene Creed
- Athanasian Creed

=== Confessions ===
- Heidelberg Catechism
- Belgic Confession
- Belhar Confession
- Canons of Dort
