= Dutch Reformed Church in South Africa (NHK) =

Protestant Christian denomination in South Africa

Dutch Reformed Church in Africa
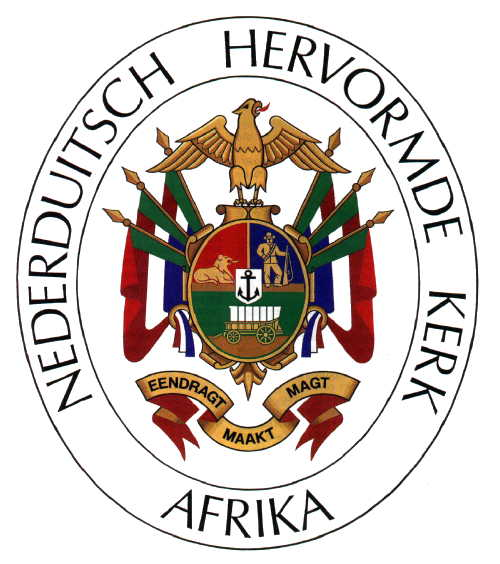
- Classification: Protestant
- Orientation: Continental Reformed
- Scripture: Protestant Bible
- Theology: Reformed
- Polity: Presbyterian
- Branched from: Dutch Reformed Church
- Separations: Reformed Churches in South Africa (1859)
- Congregations: c. 300
- Members: 130,000

The Dutch Reformed Church in Africa (Dutch: Nederduitsch Hervormde Kerk van Afrika, abbreviated NHKA) is a Reformed Christian denomination based in South Africa. It also has congregations in Namibia, Botswana, Zambia and Zimbabwe. Along with the Dutch Reformed Church in South Africa (NGK) and the Reformed Churches in South Africa, the NHKA is one of the three Dutch Reformed sister churches of South Africa. The NHKA retains the old nomenclature Nederduitsch, the word originally referring to the Dutch language. The word refers to the Low Saxon language today. The Dutch language remained the official language of the church until 1933, when the church started functioning almost exclusively in Afrikaans.

== History ==
=== Origins in the Cape Colony ===
The Dutch Reformed Church was introduced to South Africa by the Dutch East India Company's settlement at Cape Town in 1652. The first formal congregation was established in 1665 under the jurisdiction of the classis (presbytery) of Amsterdam. Despite the permanent takeover of the Cape Colony by the United Kingdom in 1806, the church remained semi-established, with congregations supported from government funds. In 1824 an autonomous synod was established at the Cape, removing the church from control from the Netherlands. This autonomous synod would become the NGK. The unwillingness of Dutch ministers to serve in a British-controlled colony meant that Scottish Presbyterian ministers with British sympathies were introduced to the church.

=== The Great Trek (1835–1846) ===
In the 1830s, Boers left the Cape Colony and established republics in the interior of South Africa in what came to be known as the Great Trek. The Voortrekkers in this movement decided to split off from the Nederduits Gereformeerde Kerk in the Cape Colony. The Dutch minister Erasmus Smit, who was sent by the Nederlandsch Zendeling Genootschap from the Netherlands, became the first NHKA minister on 21 May 1837. Congregations were founded in the colonies of Natal, the Free State (province) and the Transvaal Colony. In 1841 the American missionary Daniel Lindley took over the leadership from Smit, who had at that time become very unpopular amongst the Voortrekkers. A Dutch minister, Dirk Van der Hoff, took over the leadership of the church in the Transvaal in 1853. The founding of the oldest South African university (Stellenbosch University) and the establishment of the Theological Seminary of the Dutch Reformed Church in 1859 allowed for ministers to be trained locally. While a merger on 7 December 1885 between the NHKA and the NGK seemed successful initially, an increasing number of church members opposed the merging of the two churches and returned to the former NHKA. Reverend M.J. Goddefroy played a central role in the re-establishment of the church.

=== Second Boer War and World War II ===
The Second Boer War, which broke out in 1899, deeply affected the NHKA. Many of the church's ministers or members either died during the conflict or were sent to faraway British colonies as prisoners of war. Scorched earth tactics implemented by the British in response to the refusal of a number of Boer commandos to surrender led to the destruction of several NHKA churches along with the archival materials stored within. After the war ended in 1902, the church was formally reestablished and Dutch ministers were once again sent to South Africa. This was a period of immense growth and by 1956 the number of NKHA churches had increased from 20 to 183 congregations. The church also did not remain immune to the wars raging in the rest of the world. World War II affected many members. Most notably, professor Adrianus van Selms who served in the NHKA at University of Pretoria became a prisoner of war in Japan where he wrote numerous theological treatises.

=== Apartheid ===
Owing to its Afrikaner nationalist identity, the church has had a long and complicated history when it comes to apartheid. The church defined itself as a "volkskerk" and evangelism was aimed primarily at the "Afrikanervolk". The NHKA was initially an active member of the international ecumenical community, but a break from the ecumenical movement came during the Cottesloe Consultation in 1960, which led to the NHKA's "Fifty Years of Isolation". In 1982 the World Alliance of Reformed Churches (WARC) congress in Ottawa opened in a dramatic manner when South African delegates under the leadership of Dr. Allan Boesak refused to take communion with the NHKA delegation. The NHKA-sanctioned racial discrimination featured prominently during the meeting and the NHKA was suspended from the WARC. Support for the apartheid regime from the NHKA was not uncritically accepted by all, and many dissenters such as professors Adrianus van Selms, Cas Labuschagne, Berend Gemser and Albert Geyser left the church, with some like Geyser being accused of heresy. Other theologians and church leaders who remained within the NHKA and opposed apartheid were stigmatized and harassed with a slew of disciplinary actions. After the end of apartheid, the church increasingly re-evaluated its stance concerning apartheid and its theological grounding thereof. In 2001, the congress of the church accepted a confession in which it was stated that the church takes note of the crimes that were committed under apartheid, even by church members and that the church confesses its guilt before God and fellow human beings. The 67th General Church Assembly (AKV) decided in 2004 to re-apply for membership to the Reformed Ecumenical Council and the World Alliance of Reformed Churches. The 68th AKV refused to take any binding decisions about re-applying. In 2010, with the eye on the 69th AKV, five ministers of the NHKA (professors Johan Buitendag, Ernest van Eck, Jimmy Loader, Andries van Aarde and Yolanda Dreyer) made a public statement condemning the theological justification of apartheid. During the 69th AKV, a majority of the church's ministers and elders voted that the NHKA's support of apartheid was in contradiction to the Gospel. The term "volkskerk" was also removed from the ordinances of the church. The decision led to a backlash from the NHKA's politically right-leaning minority and 13 congregations declared themselves independent from the NHKA and members of the "Geloofsbond van Hervormde Gemeentes".

=== Recent history ===
==== Women in the church ====
Women have been serving in charity work in the NHKA since 1940 under the Nederduitsch Hervormde Sustersvereniging (NHSV).

Female ministers have been serving in the NHKA since 1979, making it one of the first churches to allow for women to serve as ministers. The first female minister in the NHKA was Professor Yolanda Dreyer. Dr. Elsabé Kloppers was the first female minister to obtain a doctorate in theology.

==== Homosexuality ====
After many years of debate about homosexuality in the church, the 68th General Church Assembly stated that homosexual persons are welcomed, will be comforted and supported in the NHKA. The assembly also stated it will do everything in its power to root out homophobia, gay-hate and any other derogatory behaviour against homosexual persons. Homosexual ministers are welcomed if they remain celibate.

== Doctrine and polity ==
The NHKA falls within the Reformed branch of Protestant Christianity. The NHKA confesses three ecumenical creeds, namely the Nicene, the Apostolic and the Athanasian. The church uses the Three Forms of Unity as its doctrinal standards. The church is part of the World Communion of Reformed Churches.

The NHKA adheres to internal regulations (Church Order), and the General Church Assembly (AKV) allows for amendments every three years under church vote.

== Church publications ==
Die Hervormer

Die Almanak

Konteks

Blitspos

Social Media

== Statistics ==
It has 130,000 members and about 300 congregations, 38 regional synods that meet annually and a General Assembly that meets every third year. Sermons are primarily given in Afrikaans.

It has a presbytery in Namibia and congregations in Botswana, Zambia and Zimbabwe.

The church is a member of the World Communion of Reformed Churches.
