= Dutch Reformed Church in South Africa (NGK) =

Christian denomination in South Africa

Dutch Reformed Church
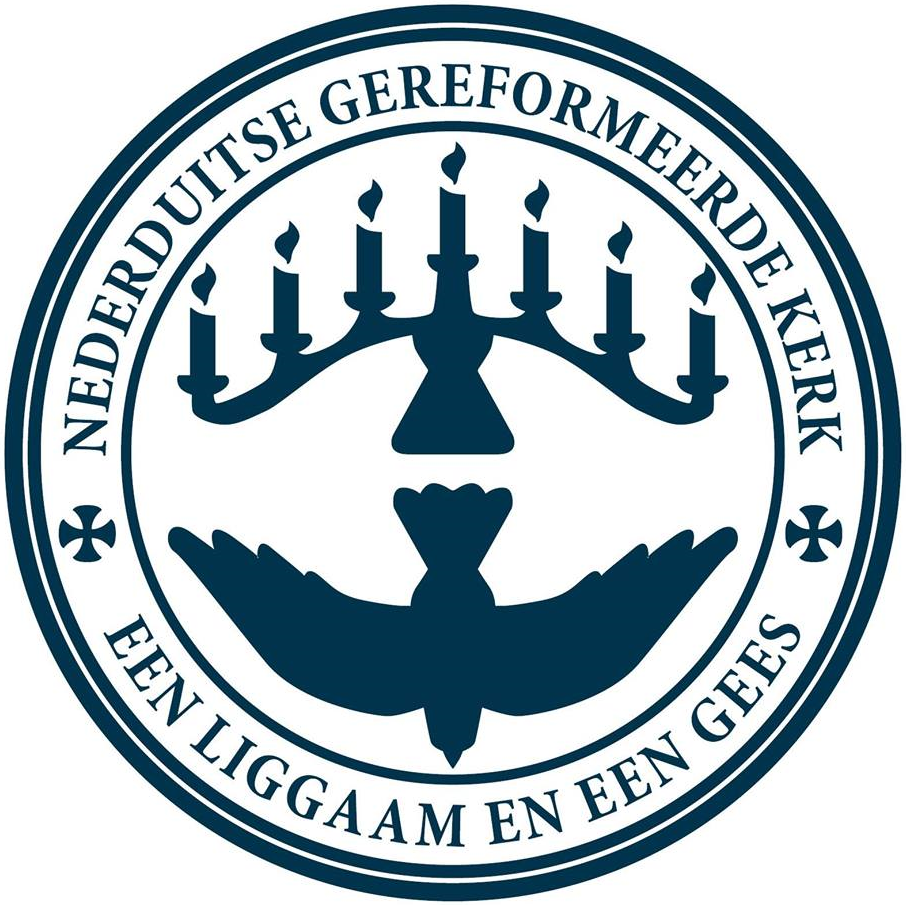
- Abbreviation: NGK
- Classification: Protestant
- Orientation: Continental Reformed
- Scripture: Protestant Bible
- Theology: Reformed
- Polity: Presbyterian
- Region: South Africa, Namibia, Eswatini, parts of Botswana, Zimbabwe and Zambia
- Branched from: Dutch Reformed Church of the Netherlands
- Separations: Afrikaans Protestant Church (1987)
- Congregations: 1,158
- Members: 1,074,765
- Ministers: 1,602
- Official website: www.ngkerk.org.za

The Dutch Reformed Church (Afrikaans: Nederduitse Gereformeerde Kerk, abbreviated NGK) is a Reformed Christian denomination in South Africa. It also has a presence in neighbouring countries, such as Namibia, Eswatini, and parts of Botswana, Zimbabwe and Zambia. In 2013 it claimed 1.1 million members and 1,602 ordained ministers in 1,158 congregations.

The Nederduits in the denomination's Afrikaans name refers to the old nomenclature for the Dutch language, formerly written as Nederduitsch in Dutch. This is not to be confused with the literal translation, Low German, which is a dialect group found in the Netherlands and Germany, and only somewhat related to Dutch. It is therefore correctly referred to as the "Dutch Reformed Church" in South Africa.

Originating in the 17th century from the Dutch Reformed Church of the Netherlands, the NGK is the largest denomination within South Africa's Dutch Reformed tradition. Along with the Dutch Reformed Church in South Africa (NHK) and the Reformed Churches in South Africa, it is considered one of the three sister churches of South Africa.

== History ==
=== Origins in the Cape Colony ===
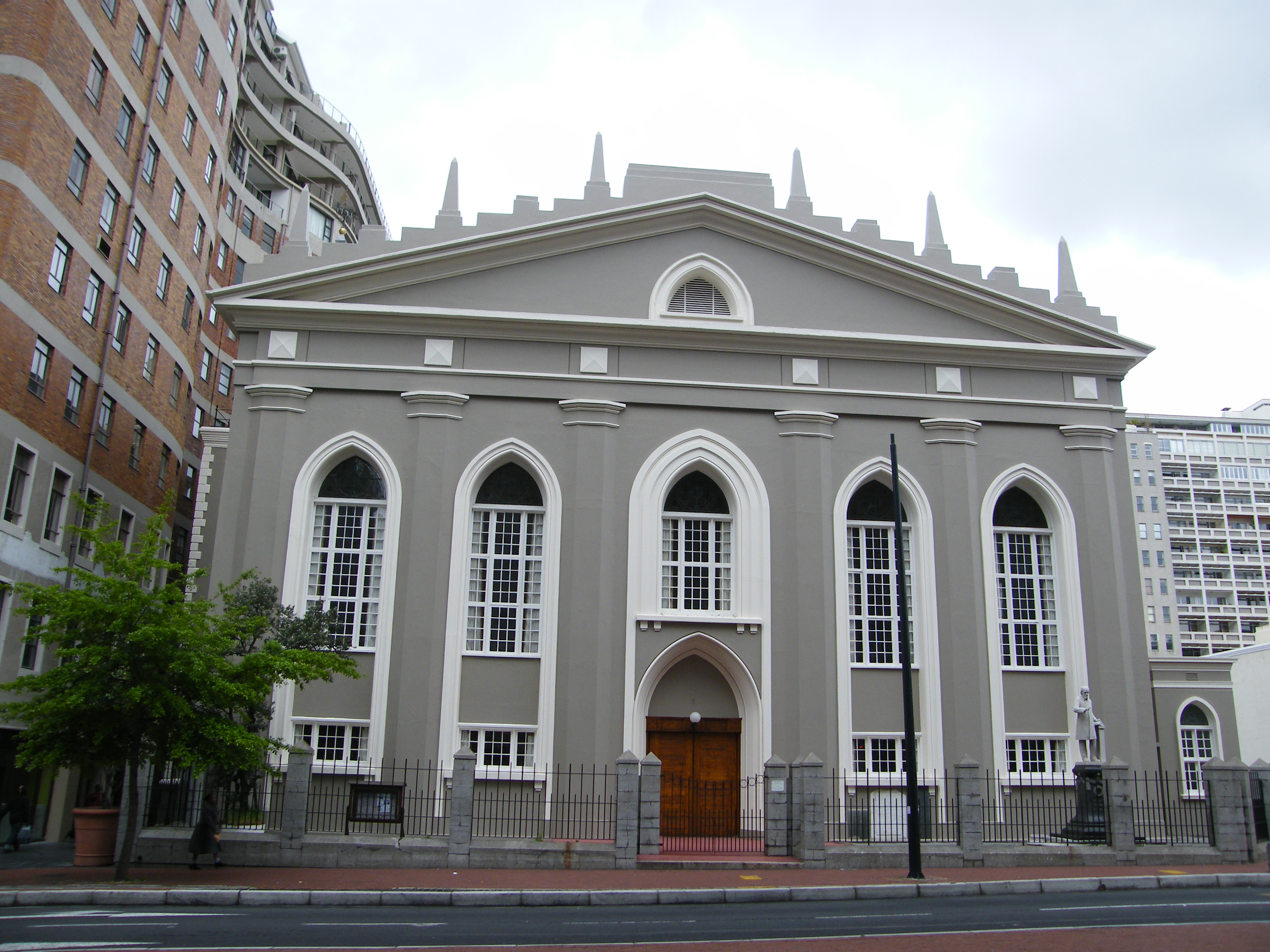
The Groote Kerk in Cape Town is the church building of the oldest existing congregation in southern Africa

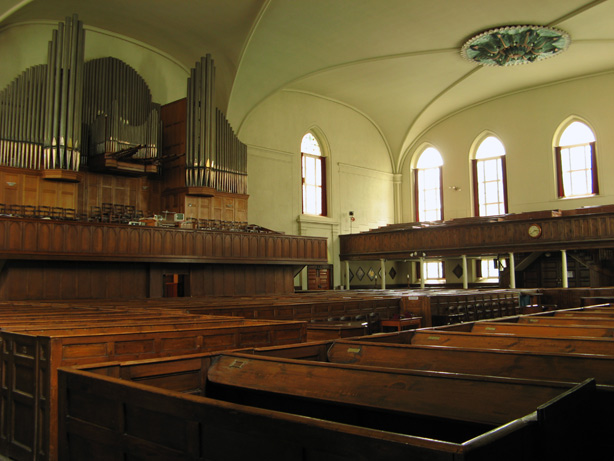
The interior of the Groote Kerk

When the Dutch East India Company sent Jan van Riebeeck to start a Dutch settlement at the Cape of Good Hope in 1652, most of the company's employees were members of the Dutch Reformed Church. At first there were no ordained ministers from the Netherlands but only a sick comforter. In 1665, Johan van Arckel arrived in the Cape Colony and became its first minister. A consistory was formed but was still subject to the control of the classis (presbytery) of Amsterdam.

In 1688, 200 Huguenot refugees arrived at the Cape. Though at first allowed to hold services in French, they were eventually assimilated into the Dutch-speaking population and became members of the Dutch Reformed Church, which had a monopoly in territory controlled by the company. An exception was eventually allowed for a Lutheran church in Cape Town (many of the company's employees were German).

During the Napoleonic Wars, the British occupied the Cape Colony in 1795 to prevent the French from doing so. The French had occupied the Netherlands, and so the link between the church in the colony and the Amsterdam classis was broken. The first British occupation was temporary, but in 1806 a long-term occupation was undertaken. For the next century, the colony would be under British control. Ministers from the Netherlands were not as willing to serve in what they now considered a foreign country, and the British authorities were not keen to have them. Presbyterian ministers from Scotland were encouraged to serve the needs of the Dutch Reformed Church in the Cape. The church was semi-established, and the government helped with stipends of ministers.

=== Divisions (1853–1859) ===
The colony had expanded a long way beyond the Cape Peninsula in the preceding two centuries, both to the north and the east, and on the eastern frontier the Dutch farmers came into contact with Xhosa-speaking cattle herders. There were conflicts over grazing and water and cattle rustling across the frontier. The frontier farmers did not like the way the government in Cape Town handled the situation, and the ending of slavery in 1834 was another bone of contention.

Afrikaner Calvinism was developing a different worldview to that of the British rulers, and many farmers left the Cape Colony in the Great Trek during the 1830s and 1840s. The Dutch Reformed ministers generally tried to discourage them and, as the Dutch Reformed Church was the established church of the colony, did not initially provide pastoral ministry for the emigrant farmers, who eventually formed several independent republics in present-day South Africa. Several of the republics in the land beyond the Vaal ("Transvaal") eventually merged to form the South African Republic in 1852.

Because the NGK was seen by the trekkers as being an agent of the Cape government, they did not trust its ministers and emissaries, seeing them as part of the British Empire's attempts to annex the Boer Republics. A minister from the Netherlands, Dirk Van der Hoff, went to the Transvaal in 1853 and became the first minister of the newly established Dutch Reformed Church (NHK), which became the state church of the South African Republic in 1860.

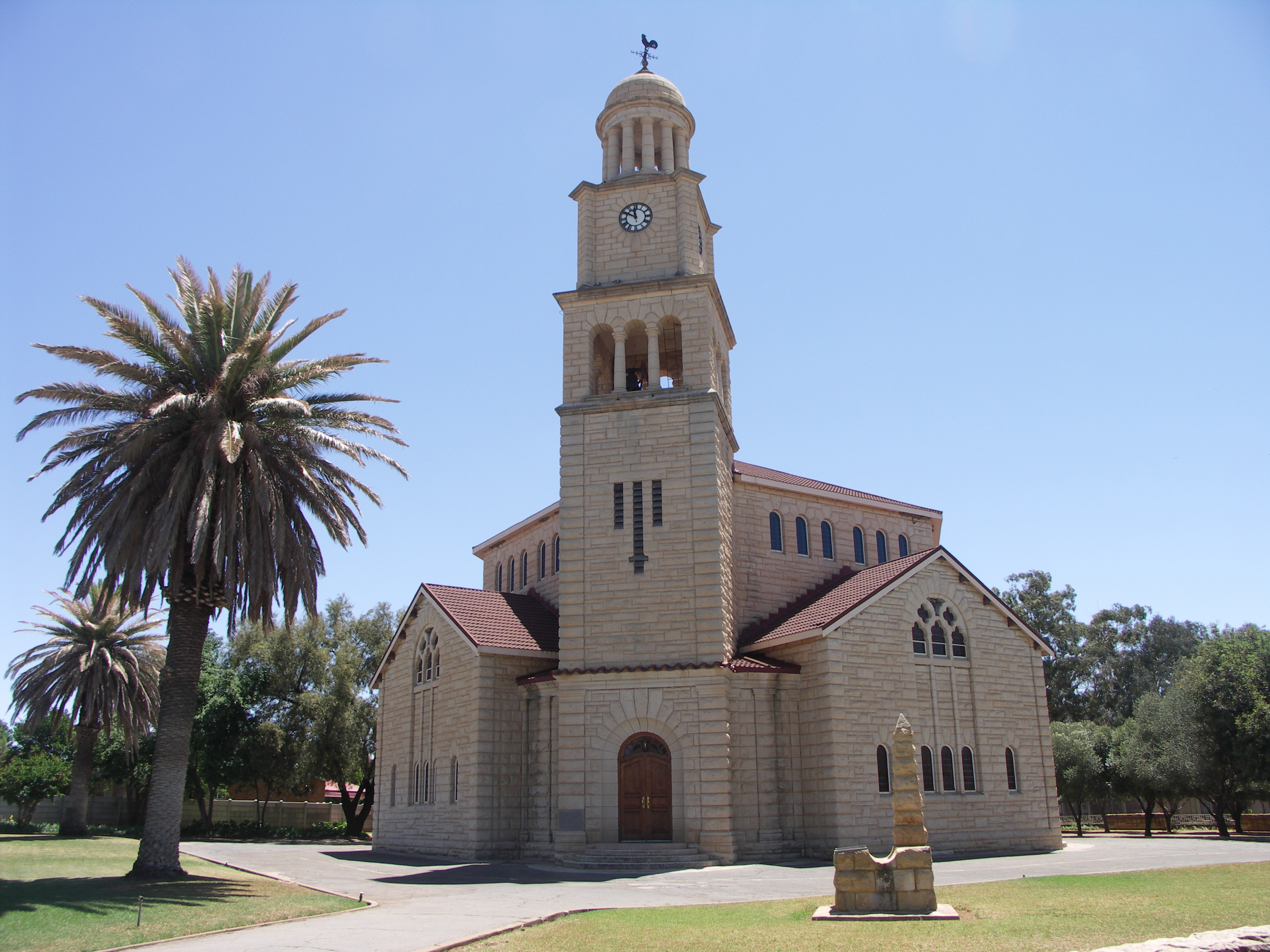
Nederduitse Gereformeerde Kerk, Wolmaransstad.

There were also religious divisions among the trekkers themselves. The more conservative ones (known as Doppers) were opposed to singing hymns that had not been determined to be scripturally sound in church. There was controversy in the Netherlands over hymn singing as well resulting in a group breaking away from the Dutch Reformed Church to form the Christian Reformed Churches. A minister from this group, Dirk Postma, traveled to the South African Republic and was accepted as a minister of the NHK. After learning that he and his congregation could be required to sing these untested hymns, however, he and the Doppers broke away from the state church to form the Reformed Churches in South Africa (GK) in 1859. There were thus now three Dutch Reformed churches in what would become South Africa—the NGK (the Cape Synod), the NHK (the state church of the South African Republic), and the GK (led by Postma).

=== Expansion (1860s–1902) ===
Meanwhile, in the NGK there was more controversy over theological liberalism and conservatism. An evangelical revival led by Andrew Murray tipped the balance away from theological liberalism. One result of the revival was that many young men felt called to the ministry, and a seminary was opened at Stellenbosch. The NGK was thus no longer dependent on getting its clergy from overseas, and as most of the recruits to the ministry had emerged from the revival this was the dominant element. One of its features was a kind of Reformed "Lent", between Ascension Day and Pentecost, a custom that eventually spread beyond the confines of the NGK.

The revival also led to an interest in mission work which led to the establishment of the Dutch Reformed Mission Church for Coloureds and the Dutch Reformed Church in Africa for Black people. These were entirely segregated from the white churches, but eventually united to form the Uniting Reformed Church in Southern Africa. The NGK expanded from the Cape Colony, but in Natal and the two inland republics it set up separate synods that were at first loosely federated but later developed a closer relationship.

Following the end of the Second Boer War in 1902, the NGK played an important role in reconstruction efforts and preventing Afrikaners from becoming anglicised. As the church ministers became increasingly involved in attempts to uplift the Afrikaner people, they also became politicised, and many became spokesmen for Afrikaner nationalism.

=== Recent history ===
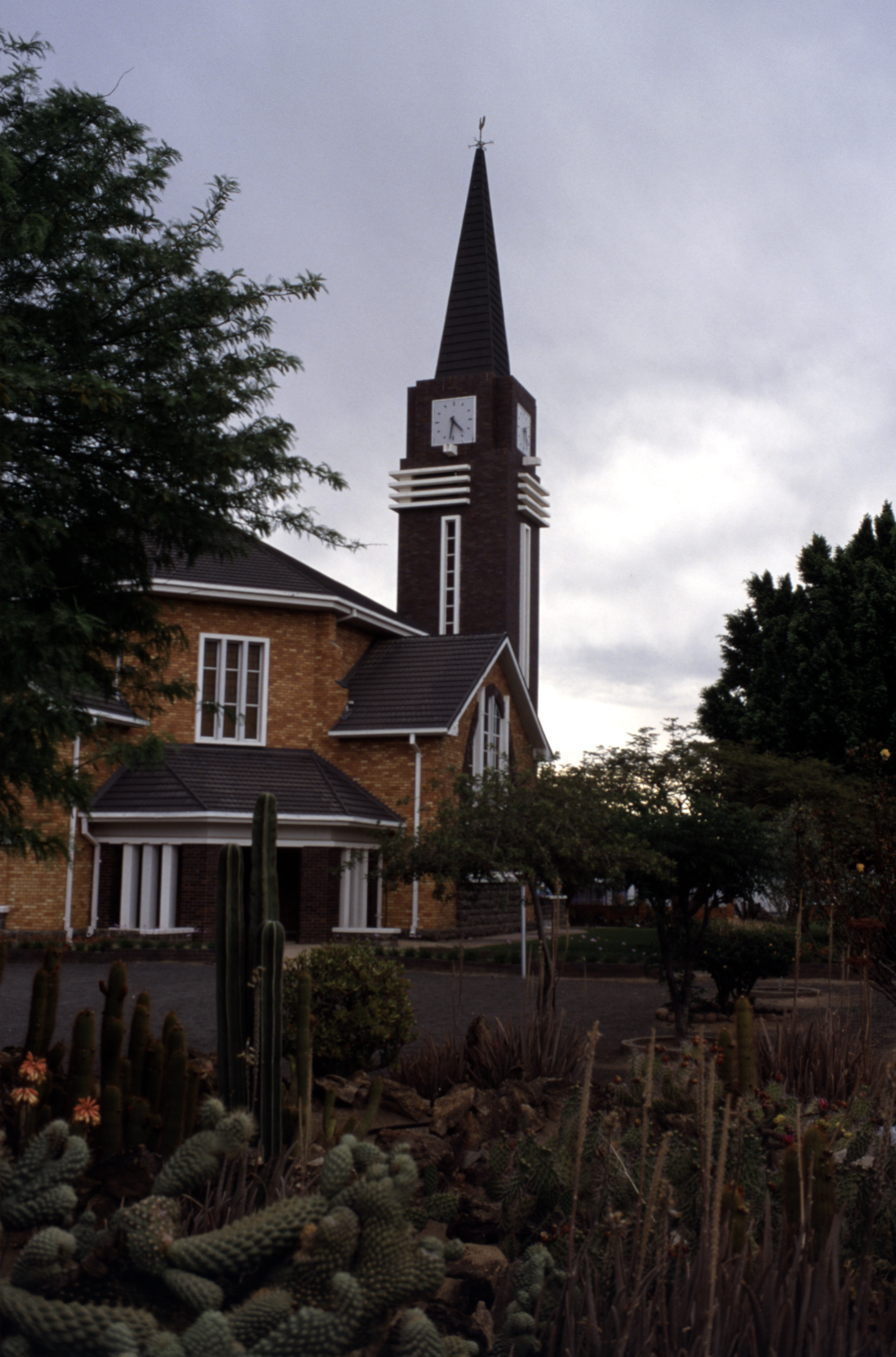
Church of the Dutch Reformed Church in Keetmanshoop, Namibia

The Church initially supported apartheid and as a result in 1982 was expelled from the World Alliance of Reformed Churches which declared apartheid to be a sin. In 1986 during the General Synod the church changed its stance on apartheid and opened its doors to people of all races (the Andrew Murray ministry within the Dutch Reformed Church, since its inception, had its doors open to people of different cultural backgrounds and ethnicities). After various processes the Church has been accepted back into the World Alliance of Reformed Churches.

In recent years, there have been efforts at reuniting the various branches of South Africa's Dutch Reformed tradition. From 6 to 8 November 2006, 127 representatives of the GK, the Uniting Reformed Church and the Dutch Reformed Church met at Achterbergh near Krugersdorp to discuss the reunification and how this can be realised. The Dutch Reformed Churches Union Act Repeal Act, 2008 of the Parliament of South Africa has one of its objectives as to "remove obstacles in the unification process of the Verenigende Gereformeerde Kerk, Reformed Church of Africa and the Dutch Reformed Churches without legislative intervention".

== Doctrine and polity ==
Theologically, the Dutch Reformed Church is in the Reformed branch of Protestantism. It holds the Bible as authoritative Word of God by which all doctrine is judged. It has three doctrinal standards: the Belgic Confession, the Heidelberg Catechism, and the Canons of Dordt.

The NGK has a presbyterian polity with power divided between synods, presbyteries, and church councils. Church councils govern local congregations. Local churches are organised geographically into 146 presbyteries ("rings") which are further organized into synods. Every four years, the 10 synods come together and meet as the General Synod. The office of the General Synod is in Pretoria, Gauteng Province.

There are ten synods, whose borders roughly resemble those of the provinces of South Africa plus Namibia. They are:

- Western and Southern Cape Synod (Western Cape province and the southern and western parts of the Northern Cape province),
- Eastern Cape Synod (Eastern Cape province)
- Northern Cape Synod (northern part of the Northern Cape province, the western part of North West province, and the southern part of Botswana)
- Natal Synod (KwaZulu-Natal province)
- Free State Synod (Free State province)
- Western Transvaal Synod (eastern part of the North West province and the southern part of the Gauteng province)
- Northern Synod (most of the Limpopo province, eastern part of Botswana, parts of Zimbabwe, and the eastern part of the Caprivi Strip of Namibia)
- Highveld Synod (south-eastern part of Gauteng province and south-western part of Mpumalanga province)
- Eastern Synod (most of the Mpumalanga province, the south-eastern part of Limpopo province, and Eswatini)
- Namibia Synod (all of Namibia except for the eastern Caprivi Strip)

== Beliefs ==
Individual church councils may decide for themselves how specific current issues that are not dealt with in the six officially accepted confessions of faith are dealt with within the congregation. This can lead to widely differing approaches on issues such as marriage, gambling, sexuality, sins in general, social issues, etc. between congregations. Both the General Synod and the regional synods may pronounce an official statement on certain issues, which local church councils broadly follow. There can be marked differences between the synods with regard to social issues.

When an issue has a wide range of opinions, the synods and the General Synod releases "discussion documents" which are intended to move the opinion of congregations in some direction.

=== LGBTQ inclusion ===
Traditionally, and certainly prior to the end of Apartheid, the NG Church held the view that homosexuality is a mental health issue or a sinful state of being. No distinction was made between homosexuality and homosexual activity, as both were regarded as either a psychological illness or a deliberate decision to sin.

The 1982 General Synod declared that homosexual sex is sinful and that homosexuals may not participate in the Lord's Supper or become elders, deacons or pastors, regardless of whether they have sex. The 1986 General Synod confirmed that homosexual sex and homosexual relationships are sinful, but declared that homosexuals may use the Lord's Supper and may become elders, deacons or pastors, if they are otherwise eligible. The 1986 decision confirmed the existence of homosexuality as a sexual orientation, but labelled it a deviant form of sexuality.

By 1990, the mood was changing, and the 1990 General Synod appointed a committee to investigate the validity of the 1986 decision. The 1994 and 1998 General Synods did not deal with the issue. By the 2002 General Synod, the synod indicated that it was doubtful about the 1986 decision. The 1986 decision was formally withdrawn in 2004, although in practice the 2004 decision (which replaced the 1986 decision entirely) was the same as the 1986 decision.

The church's previous stance on homosexuality was published in 2004, and confirmed by the 2007 and 2013 General Synods.

=== Marriage ===
In October 2015, the General Synod voted in favour to allow church councils to decide about blessing of same-sex unions, while confirming the belief that marriage is only possible between one man and one woman.

The 2015 decision caused a backlash of appeals and objections. In November 2015, the decision was suspended, initially to be discussed again at the 2017 General Synod.However, on 7 September 2016, the suspension was lifted. However, in November 2016, an extraordinary synod reversed much of the 2015 decision officially.

In June 2017, progressive members of the clergy and laity have taken the denomination to court to restore the decision from 2015 and reject the reversal.Although the decision was reversed, local congregations, as aforementioned, are able to make their own decisions. The church's reversal still "makes allowance for ministers and parishes to make their own decision around this. It is stated that no decision may be forced on any parish".

In March 2019, the secular Gauteng High Court, in Pretoria ruled to reverse the 2016 decision and decided that ministers should bless same-sex unions and that gay and lesbian ministers could marry and be ordained.This decision was reached, in part, on the basis that, while religious organizations have the religious freedom to define marriage, the 2016 decision was not made in accordance with the church's own proper process. The General Secretary Gustav Claasse told the press that, despite the court decision the church will hold to its 2016 official stance against same-sex marriage.

In October 2019, the General Synod adopted a resolution confirming the possibility for church councils to choose on the blessings of same-sex unions.

=== Abortion ===
Prior to 1994, the church's view on abortion was broadly aligned with South African legislation, namely that induced abortion was only acceptable if there was immediate danger to the mother's life, or if the conception was due to rape that had been reported to the police.

The 1982 General Synod declared that abortion is indefensible on both Biblical and scientific grounds, and that abortion is always "the termination of a life". The church believes that life begins at conception, and that using contraceptives that cause a fertilised ovum to be expelled is therefore also sinful.

At the 1986 General Synod, a proposal was considered to draw up a list of exceptional cases in which abortion might be allowable. After consultation with experts, including medical experts, the synod decided to base their stance on abortion solely on the Bible and not on medical evidence or on a list of exceptions.

By 1994, with the election of a new government and the adoption of a new constitution in South Africa, it became apparent that abortion on demand may be legalised, and the church was forced to re-examine and restate its stance. Abortion on demand became legal in South Africa in 1997.

The church's current decision on abortion was taken at the 1994 General Synod. The church regards all types of abortion as sinful, including involuntary abortion. However, in cases where abortion is "unavoidable", it is sufficient that the mother protest against the abortion, confess her guilt, and feel genuine remorse. Assisting in an abortion is also sinful.

An official publication from 1999, "Geloofsverklaring", which deals with various current issues, stated however that while abortion on demand is morally indefensible, abortion should not be denied in cases where it is the "lesser of two evils".
