= Lichtenburg (House of Assembly of South Africa constituency) =

- Former constituency for the South African House of Assembly
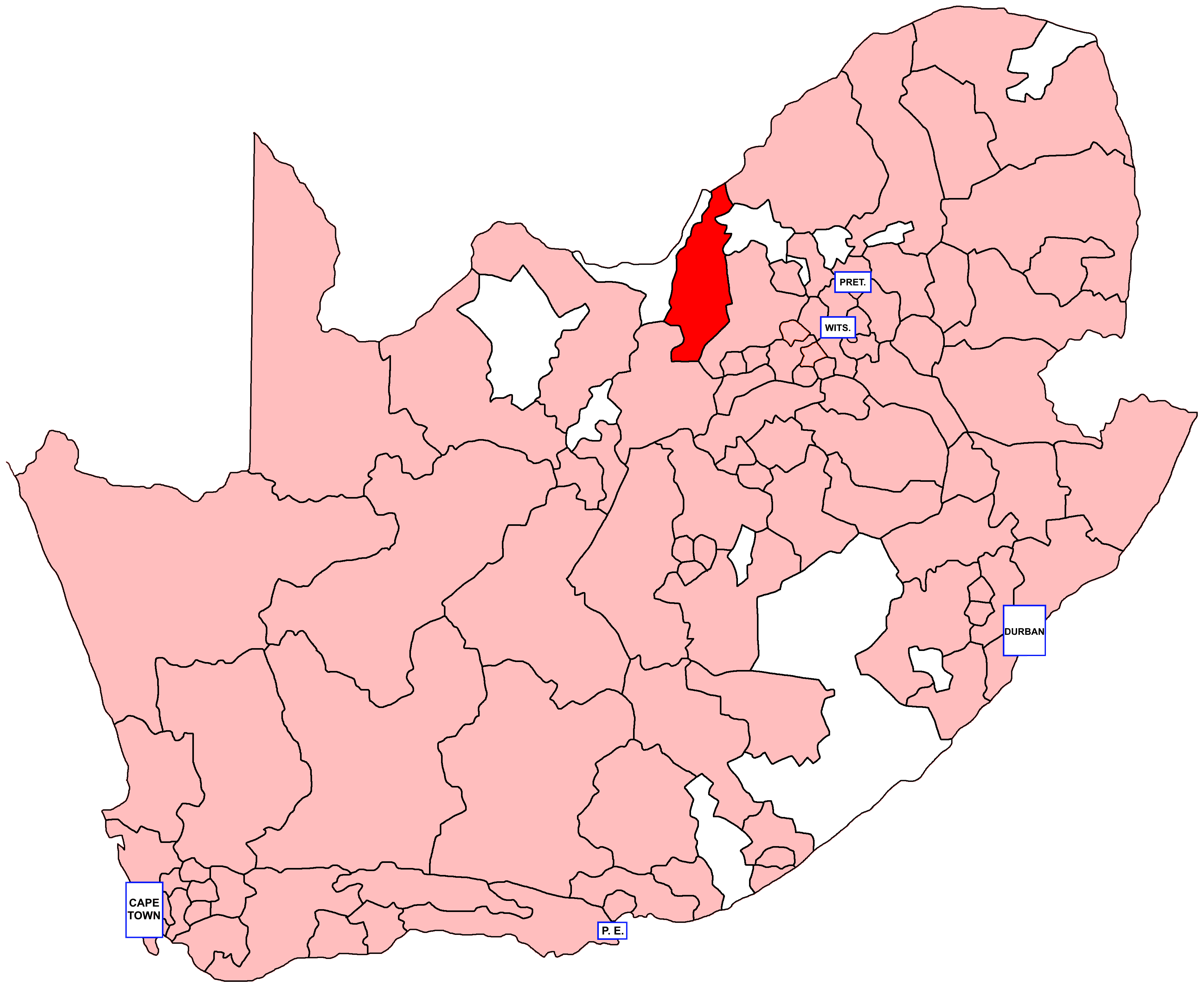
- Location of Lichtenburg within South Africa (1981)
- Province: Transvaal
- Electorate: 16,004 (1989)

Former constituency
- Created: 1910
- Abolished: 1994
- Number of members: 1
- Last MHA: Ferdi Hartzenberg (CP)
- Replaced by: North West

Lichtenburg was a constituency in the Transvaal Province of South Africa, which existed from 1910 to 1994. Named after the town of Lichtenburg, it covered a rural area in the western Transvaal. Throughout its existence it elected one member to the House of Assembly and one to the Transvaal Provincial Council.

== Franchise notes ==
When the Union of South Africa was formed in 1910, the electoral qualifications in use in each pre-existing colony were kept in place. In the Transvaal Colony, and its predecessor the South African Republic, the vote was restricted to white men, and as such, elections in the Transvaal Province were held on a whites-only franchise from the beginning. The franchise was also restricted by property and education qualifications until the 1933 general election, following the passage of the Women's Enfranchisement Act, 1930 and the Franchise Laws Amendment Act, 1931. From then on, the franchise was given to all white citizens aged 21 or over. Non-whites remained disenfranchised until the end of apartheid and the introduction of universal suffrage in 1994.

== History ==
Like most of the rural Transvaal, Lichtenburg had a largely Afrikaans-speaking electorate. It was an early safe seat for the National Party in the Transvaal, helped by the fact that its Nationalist MP was Tielman Roos, a senior cabinet minister in J. B. M. Hertzog's Nationalist-Labour Pact government. Following Roos' departure from the seat, it was held by a succession of Nationalist, then United Party, then Nationalist MPs, culminating in 1970 with the election of Ferdi Hartzenberg, who would represent the seat for the remainder of its existence. Hartzenberg started his career on the right end of the National Party, and later joined Andries Treurnicht in breaking away from the NP to form the new Conservative Party. After Treurnicht's death in 1993, Hartzenberg took over as leader of the party, and thus as Leader of the Opposition in the whites-only House of Assembly. He maintained this position until the non-racial 1994 general election, which he and the Conservative Party boycotted, thus ending his parliamentary career.

== Members ==
| Election | Member | Party |
|---|---|---|
| 1910 | H. C. W. Vermaas | Het Volk |
| 1915 | Tielman Roos | National |
| 1920 | Tielman Roos | National |
| 1921 | Tielman Roos | National |
| 1924 | Tielman Roos | National |
| 1929 | A. J. Swanepoel | National |
| 1933 | A. J. Swanepoel | National |
| 1934 | A. J. Swanepoel | United |
| 1938 | A. J. Swanepoel | United |
| 1939 by | A. P. Swart | United |
| 1943 | A. I. Ludick | HNP |
| 1948 | A. I. Ludick | HNP |
| 1953 | M. C. van Niekerk | National |
| 1958 | M. C. van Niekerk | National |
| 1961 | M. C. van Niekerk | National |
| 1966 | M. C. van Niekerk | National |
| 1970 | Ferdi Hartzenberg | National |
| 1974 | Ferdi Hartzenberg | National |
| 1977 | Ferdi Hartzenberg | National |
| 1981 | Ferdi Hartzenberg | National |
| 1982 | Ferdi Hartzenberg | Conservative |
| 1987 | Ferdi Hartzenberg | Conservative |
| 1989 | Ferdi Hartzenberg | Conservative |
| 1994 | Constituency abolished | |

== Detailed results ==
=== Elections in the 1910s ===
General election 1910: Lichtenburg
| Party | Candidate | Votes | % | ±% |
|---|---|---|---|---|
| Het Volk | H. C. W. Vermaas | Unopposed | | |
| Het Volk win (new seat) | | | | |

General election 1915: Lichtenburg
| Party | Candidate | Votes | % | ±% |
|---|---|---|---|---|
| National | Tielman Roos | 1,449 | 60.7 | New |
| South African | E. H. Matthews | 939 | 39.3 | N/A |
| Majority | | 510 | 21.4 | N/A |
| Turnout | | 2,388 | 77.2 | N/A |
| National gain from South African | | Swing | N/A | |

=== Elections in the 1920s ===
General election 1920: Lichtenburg
| Party | Candidate | Votes | % | ±% |
|---|---|---|---|---|
| National | Tielman Roos | 1,458 | 68.2 | +7.5 |
| South African | J. G. Cilliers | 679 | 31.8 | −7.5 |
| Majority | | 779 | 36.4 | +15.0 |
| Turnout | | 2,137 | 72.6 | −4.6 |
| National hold | | Swing | +7.5 | |

General election 1921: Lichtenburg
| Party | Candidate | Votes | % | ±% |
|---|---|---|---|---|
| National | Tielman Roos | 1,516 | 72.1 | +3.9 |
| South African | B. C. Creyling | 587 | 27.9 | −3.9 |
| Majority | | 929 | 44.2 | +7.8 |
| Turnout | | 2,103 | 65.5 | −7.1 |
| National hold | | Swing | +3.9 | |

General election 1924: Lichtenburg
| Party | Candidate | Votes | % | ±% |
|---|---|---|---|---|
| National | Tielman Roos | 1,302 | 66.0 | −6.1 |
| South African | A. P. Visser | 651 | 33.0 | +5.1 |
| Rejected ballots | | 20 | 0.9 | N/A |
| Majority | | 651 | 33.0 | −11.2 |
| Turnout | | 1,973 | 81.3 | +15.8 |
| National hold | | Swing | -5.6 | |

General election 1929: Lichtenburg
| Party | Candidate | Votes | % | ±% |
|---|---|---|---|---|
| National | A. J. Swanepoel | 1,421 | 66.2 | +0.2 |
| South African | C. M. L. Taljaard | 678 | 31.6 | −1.4 |
| Independent | M. C. P. Brink | 32 | 1.5 | New |
| Rejected ballots | | 16 | 0.7 | -0.2 |
| Majority | | 743 | 34.6 | +1.6 |
| Turnout | | 2,147 | 62.1 | −19.2 |
| National hold | | Swing | +0.8 | |

=== Elections in the 1930s ===
General election 1933: Lichtenburg
| Party | Candidate | Votes | % | ±% |
|---|---|---|---|---|
| National | A. J. Swanepoel | 2,431 | 62.7 | −3.5 |
| Roos | C. J. Grové | 1,341 | 35.9 | New |
| Rejected ballots | | 53 | 1.4 | +0.7 |
| Majority | | 1,000 | 26.8 | N/A |
| Turnout | | 3,735 | 62.5 | +0.4 |
| National hold | | Swing | N/A | |

General election 1938: Lichtenburg
| Party | Candidate | Votes | % | ±% |
|---|---|---|---|---|
| United | A. J. Swanepoel | 2,466 | 58.3 | −4.4 |
| Purified National | F. J. Truter | 1,715 | 40.5 | New |
| Rejected ballots | | 48 | 1.2 | -0.2 |
| Majority | | 751 | 17.8 | N/A |
| Turnout | | 4,229 | 83.3 | +20.8 |
| United hold | | Swing | N/A | |

Lichtenburg by-election, 4 April 1939
| Party | Candidate | Votes | % | ±% |
|---|---|---|---|---|
| United | A. P. Swart | 2,344 | 53.2 | −5.1 |
| Purified National | C. R. Swart | 2,011 | 45.7 | +5.2 |
| Rejected ballots | | 49 | 1.1 | -0.1 |
| Majority | | 333 | 7.6 | −10.2 |
| Turnout | | 4,404 | 84.6 | +1.3 |
| United hold | | Swing | -5.1 | |
