= Tom de Beer =

South African company director and chairman

Chairman of the Afrikaner Broederbond
- In office 1993–1994
- Preceded by: de Lange, J.P.
- Succeeded by: Organization changed

Chairman of the Afrikanerbond
- In office 1994–2000
- Preceded by: Organization started
- Succeeded by: Venter, F.

Personal details
- Born: Thomas Louw de Beer; 18 May 1935 South Africa
- Died: 9 October 2022 (aged 87) South Africa
- Spouse: Emmerentia Aletta Lombard
- Known for: Director of companies, Afrikaner Broederbond and the Afrikanerbond

Thomas Louw de Beer (18 May 1935 - 9 October 2022) was a company director in South Africa and the last chairman of the South African secret organization called the Afrikaner Broederbond. After the secrecy was dropped a new organization were founded called the Afrikanerbond. He was the first chairman of the new organization. The Afrikanerbond is today open for any gender and race.

== Roots ==
De Beer was born on 18 May 1935, to Roelof Adriaan de Beer and Wilhelmina Hendrika Burger. In 1966 he married Emmerentia Aletta Lombard. He obtained a Bcomm degree. He further is a qualified Chartered Accountant, CA (SA), registered at the South African Institute of Chartered Accountants.

== Work life ==
He started to work in 1954 as an accountant in Boshof, Orange Free State before he joined Federale Mynbou in 1965. In 1978, he was awarded the position of Chief Financial officer at Gencor Limited. In 1986 he became chairman of Genbel South Africa Limited, an investment company.

During his career he was directors of:

- Kumba Resources Limited – listed on the JSE in 2001
- Iscor Limited – which was subsequently taken over by ArcelorMittal Ltd.
- Trans Natal Coal Corporation – an investment company in the Coal Operations category
- Sappi – South African listed company in the wood and paper industry
- MES – de Beer was chairman of this non-profit company which aimed to better the prospects of homeless people in urban areas.

== Afrikaner Broederbond ==
He became a member in 1963, and was chairman from 1993 to 1994.

== Afrikanerbond ==
He was chairman from 1994–2000. De Beer was responsible for changing the organization to a non-secret, non-sexist and non-racial organization. He believes that the new organization can play a facilitation role. He felt that Apartheid right wing political parties members (which were not welcome in the old Afrikaner Broederbond) needed to come to terms with reality. De Beer however felt that the Afrikaans language and Christianity, together with cultural norms would remain part of the new organization.

== Recognition ==
He received the Ellen Kuzwayo Council Award from the University of Johannesburg.
