= Danie du Plessis =

Head of the South African Railways
- In office 1952–1961
- Preceded by: Heckroodt, W.H.L.
- Succeeded by: Hugo, J.P.

Personal details
- Born: Daniël Hendrik Celliers du Plessis; 12 March 1898 Colesberg, Cape Colony, South Africa
- Died: 13 July 1981 (aged 83) Johannesburg, Transvaal, South Africa
- Spouse: Susanna Seugnette du Toit
- Children: 4
- Education: St John's College, Johannesburg
- Known for: Head of South African Railways and co-founder of the Afrikaner Broederbond

Daniël Hendrik Celliers du Plessis (12 March 1898 – 13 July 1981) was the Head of the South African Railways and co-founder of the Afrikaner Broederbond.

== Roots and education ==
Du Plessis was born on 12 March 1898 in Colesberg, Cape Colony. He was the son of Izak David du Plessis and Hester Cornelia Cecilia Lessing. Du Plessis and his family moved from Colesberg, to Parys, Orange Free State and then to Germiston, Transvaal. He studied Languages and Dutch literacy through St. John College in Johannesburg. He married Susanna Seugnette du Toit in 1928. Out of the marriage 4 children were born. He died in Johannesburg, Transvaal, South Africa on 13 July 1981.

== Career ==
He worked as an office clerk for a short while at an attorneys firm. In middle 1915 he started a career at the South African Railways. He worked himself up through the ranks and in 1952 he became the Head of the South African Railways, taking over from W.H.L. Heckroodt. He remained in that position until his retirement in 1961. Johannes Hugo succeeded him. Highlights of his career included :

- 1946 – leader of a mission to South and North America to investigate the modernisation of the railways administration.
- 1947 – Member of the Royal Commission to report on the status of Railways in Australia.
- 1961 – After his retirement he was chairman of the government Commission on the status of third party insurance.

== Broederbond ==
In middle 1918, du Plessis, together with his school friend H.J. Klopper and two others founded the Afrikaner Broederbond. It took place in his house. The other two were H.W. van der Merwe and J.F. Naude. The organisation was founded to look after Afrikaner White interest. It focussed on poverty and was a male only organisation. H.J. Klopper was the first chairman. The organisation in later years became the Afrikanerbond, and is today a non-sexist, non-racial and non-secretive.
