= Gordonia (House of Assembly of South Africa constituency) =

South African constituency, 1924–1994

- Former constituency for the South African House of Assembly
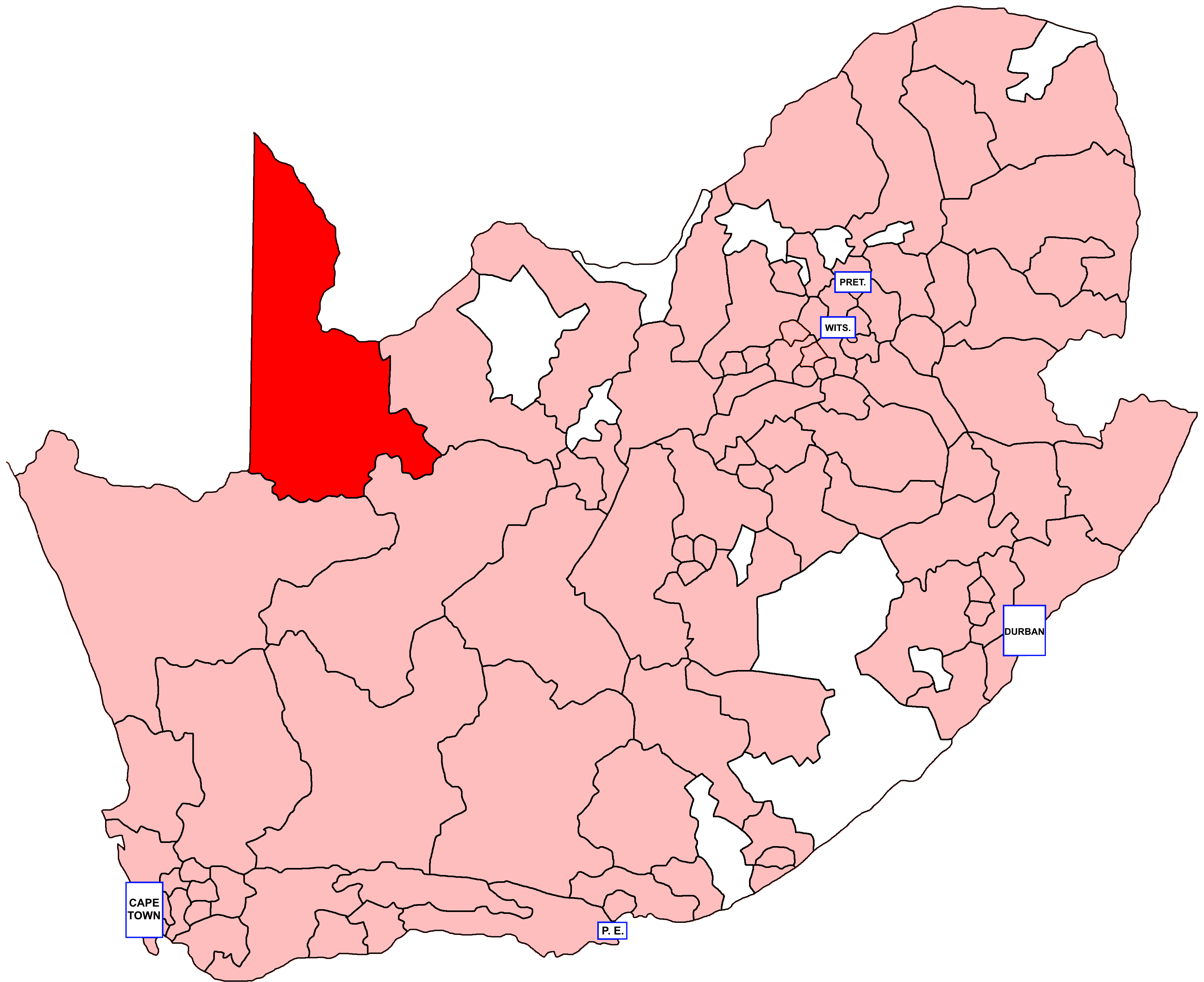
- Location of Gordonia within South Africa (1981)
- Province: Cape of Good Hope
- Electorate: 10,477 (1989)

Former constituency
- Created: 1924
- Abolished: 1994
- Number of members: 1
- Last MHA: Japie van Wyk (NP)
- Created from: Prieska
- Replaced by: Northern Cape

Gordonia was a constituency in the Cape Province of South Africa, which existed from 1924 to 1994. It covered a large rural area along the Orange River, centred on the town of Upington. Throughout its existence it elected one member to the House of Assembly and one to the Cape Provincial Council.

== Franchise notes ==
When the Union of South Africa was formed in 1910, the electoral qualifications in use in each pre-existing colony were kept in place. The Cape Colony had implemented a “colour-blind” franchise known as the Cape Qualified Franchise, which included all adult literate men owning more than £75 worth of property (controversially raised from £25 in 1892), and this initially remained in effect after the colony became the Cape Province. As of 1908, 22,784 out of 152,221 electors in the Cape Colony were “Native or Coloured”. Eligibility to serve in Parliament and the Provincial Council, however, was restricted to whites from 1910 onward.

The first challenge to the Cape Qualified Franchise came with the Women's Enfranchisement Act, 1930 and the Franchise Laws Amendment Act, 1931, which extended the vote to women and removed property qualifications for the white population only – non-white voters remained subject to the earlier restrictions. In 1936, the Representation of Natives Act removed all black voters from the common electoral roll and introduced three “Native Representative Members”, white MPs elected by the black voters of the province and meant to represent their interests in particular. A similar provision was made for Coloured voters with the Separate Representation of Voters Act, 1951, and although this law was challenged by the courts, it went into effect in time for the 1958 general election, which was thus held with all-white voter rolls for the first time in South African history. The all-white franchise would continue until the end of apartheid and the introduction of universal suffrage in 1994.

== History ==
Like many constituencies in the rural Cape, the electorate of Gordonia was largely Afrikaans-speaking and conservative, and the seat was held throughout its existence by the National Party. On its creation in 1924, it largely replaced the abolished seat of Prieska, and Prieska MP J. H. Conradie became Gordonia's first MP. Shortly after the 1929 election, Conradie was appointed Administrator of the Cape Province, and his predecessor in that post, Adriaan Fourie, won the resulting by-election unopposed. Fourie served in cabinet under J. B. M. Hertzog, and followed him into the United Party in 1934, but this did not sit well with Gordonia's electorate, who replaced him in 1938 with a Purified National Party candidate – the younger J. H. Conradie, who would become Speaker of the House of Assembly while serving as MP for Gordonia.

Gordonia remained a safe Nationalist seat until the end of apartheid. Its last two MPs, Schalk van der Merwe and Japie van Wyk, both served as cabinet ministers, the former under John Vorster and P. W. Botha and the latter in the final stage of F. W. de Klerk’s government. In 1989, van Wyk faced a strong challenge from the far-right Conservative Party, but as in most of the Cape Province, this wasn’t enough to defeat him.

== Members ==
Election	Member	Party
1924	J. H. Conradie	National
1929	J. H. Conradie	National
1929 by	A. P. J. Fourie	National
1933	A. P. J. Fourie	National
1934	A. P. J. Fourie	United
1938	J. H. Conradie	GNP
1943	J. H. Conradie	HNP
1948	J. H. Conradie	HNP
1953	J. H. Conradie	National
1958	J. H. Conradie	National
1961	G. P. Kotzé	National
1966	Schalk van der Merwe	National
1970	Schalk van der Merwe	National
1974	Schalk van der Merwe	National
1977	Schalk van der Merwe	National
1981	Japie van Wyk	National
1987	Japie van Wyk	National
1989	Japie van Wyk	National
1994	constituency abolished	

== Detailed results ==
=== Elections in the 1920s ===
General election 1924: Gordonia
Party	Candidate	Votes	%	±%
National	J. H. Conradie	1,607	55.7	New
South African	J. P. Coetzee	1,260	43.6	New
Rejected ballots		19	0.7	N/A
Majority		347	12.1	N/A
Turnout		2,886	84.8	N/A
National win (new seat)				

General election 1929: Gordonia
Party	Candidate	Votes	%	±%
National	J. H. Conradie	1,537	56.2	+0.5
South African	P. J. van der Westhuizen	1,152	42.1	−1.5
Rejected ballots		45	1.7	+1.0
Majority		385	14.1	+2.0
Turnout		2,734	82.2	−2.6
National hold		Swing	+1.0	

Gordonia by-election, 1 October 1929
Party	Candidate	Votes	%	±%
National	A. P. J. Fourie	Unopposed		
National hold				

=== Elections in the 1930s ===
General election 1933: Gordonia
Party	Candidate	Votes	%	±%
National	A. P. J. Fourie	Unopposed		
National hold				

General election 1938: Gordonia
Party	Candidate	Votes	%	±%
Purified National	J. H. Conradie	3,143	55.5	New
United	A. P. J. Fourie	2,404	42.4	N/A
Independent	N. van der Westhuizen	76	1.3	New
Rejected ballots		48	0.8	N/A
Majority		739	13.0	N/A
Turnout		5,666	88.8	N/A
Purified National gain from United		Swing	N/A	
