= Potchefstroom (House of Assembly of South Africa constituency) =

- Former constituency for the South African House of Assembly
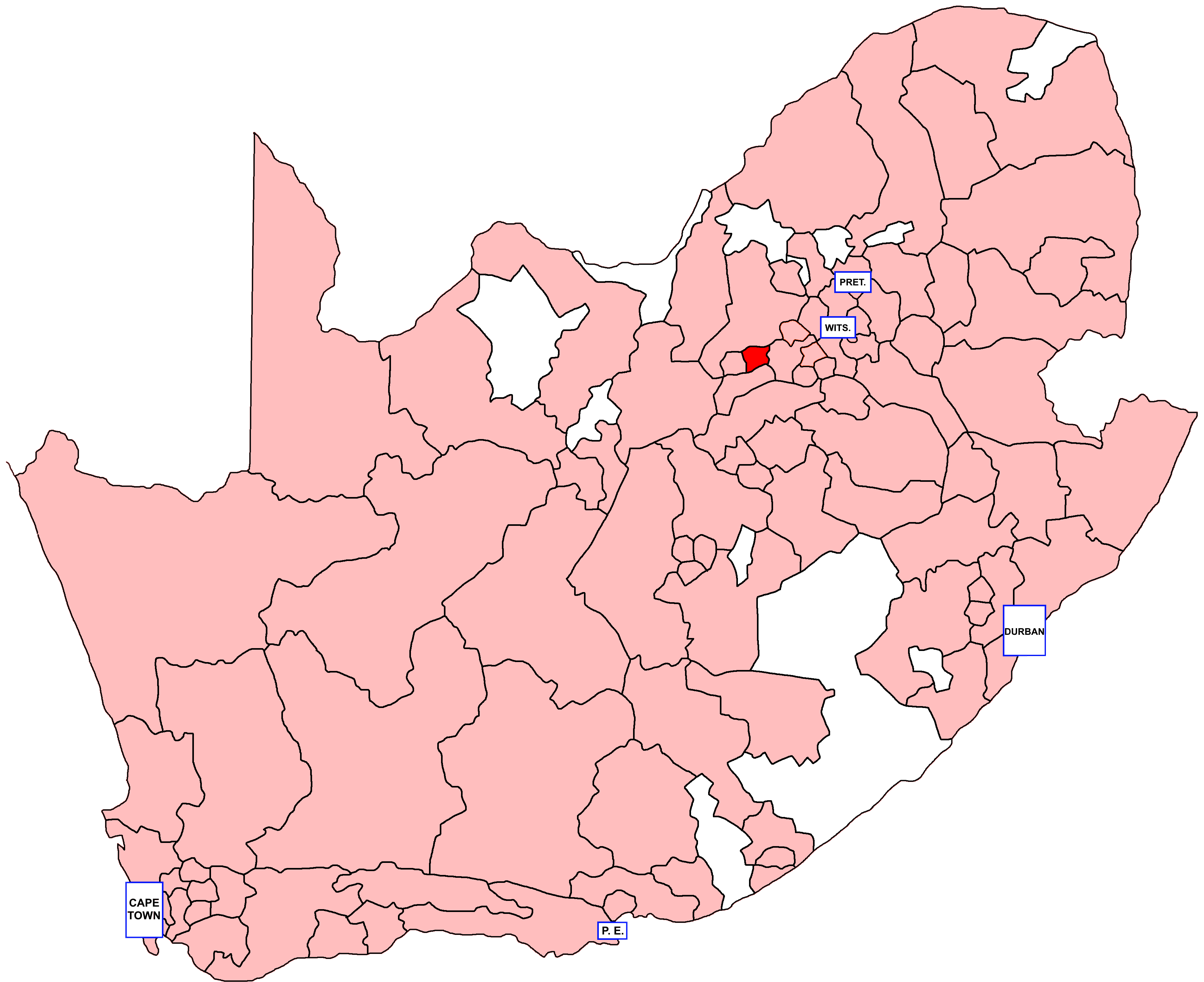
- Location of Potchefstroom within South Africa (1981)
- Province: Transvaal
- Electorate: 23,083 (1992 by)

Former constituency
- Created: 1910
- Abolished: 1994
- Number of members: 1
- Last MHA: A. S. Beyers (CP)
- Replaced by: North West

Potchefstroom was a constituency in the Transvaal Province of South Africa, which existed from 1910 to 1994. It covered a part of the western Transvaal centred on the town of Potchefstroom. Throughout its existence it elected one member to the House of Assembly and one to the Transvaal Provincial Council.

== Franchise notes ==
When the Union of South Africa was formed in 1910, the electoral qualifications in use in each pre-existing colony were kept in place. In the Transvaal Colony, and its predecessor the South African Republic, the vote was restricted to white men, and as such, elections in the Transvaal Province were held on a whites-only franchise from the beginning. The franchise was also restricted by property and education qualifications until the 1933 general election, following the passage of the Women's Enfranchisement Act, 1930 and the Franchise Laws Amendment Act, 1931. From then on, the franchise was given to all white citizens aged 21 or over. Non-whites remained disenfranchised until the end of apartheid and the introduction of universal suffrage in 1994.

== History ==
Like most of the rural Transvaal, Potchefstroom had a largely Afrikaans-speaking electorate. In its early days, it was a marginal seat, seeing tight contests between the National and South African parties, before going through a brief period of United Party dominance in the 1930s and 40s. In 1948, it was captured by Johan Heinrich Steyn of the Afrikaner Party, who soon joined the governing National Party - from then on, it became a safe seat for the NP. Its longest-serving MP, Louis le Grange, was first elected in 1966, and served as a cabinet minister under John Vorster and P. W. Botha before being made Speaker of the House of Assembly in 1987. He died in office in 1991, and the resulting by-election was won by the Conservative Party - coming shortly before the referendum on ending apartheid, this was seen as a major setback for the governing party.

== Members ==
Election	Member	Party
1910	J. A. Neser	Het Volk
1915	G. W. Holl	South African
1915 by	N. J. de Wet	South African
1920	N. J. de Wet	South African
1921	J. G. Obermeyer	National
1924	M. L. Fick	National
1929	M. L. Fick	National
1933	M. L. Fick	National
1934	M. L. Fick	United
1938	Hubert van der Merwe	United
1943	Hubert van der Merwe	United
1948	J. H. Steyn	Afrikaner
1953	J. H. Steyn	National
1958	J. H. Steyn	National
1961	J. H. Steyn	National
1966	Louis le Grange	National
1970	Louis le Grange	National
1974	Louis le Grange	National
1977	Louis le Grange	National
1981	Louis le Grange	National
1987	Louis le Grange	National
1989	Louis le Grange	National
1992 by	A. S. Beyers	Conservative
1994	Constituency abolished	

== Detailed results ==
=== Elections in the 1910s ===
General election 1910: Potchefstroom
Party	Candidate	Votes	%	±%
Het Volk	J. A. Neser	1,260	73.3	New
Unionist	R. J. E. Orpen	458	26.7	New
Majority		802	46.6	N/A
Het Volk win (new seat)				

General election 1915: Potchefstroom
Party	Candidate	Votes	%	±%
South African	G. W. Holl	1,043	56.8	−16.5
National	W. J. de Klerk	794	43.2	New
Majority		249	13.6	N/A
Turnout		1,837	82.5	N/A
South African hold		Swing	N/A	

Potchefstroom by-election, 1 November 1915
Party	Candidate	Votes	%	±%
South African	N. J. de Wet	1,060	59.7	+2.9
National	C. L. Olen	716	40.3	−2.9
Majority		344	19.4	+5.8
Turnout		1,776	79.7	−2.8
South African hold		Swing	+2.9	

=== Elections in the 1920s ===
General election 1920: Potchefstroom
Party	Candidate	Votes	%	±%
South African	N. J. de Wet	1,127	51.2	−5.6
National	J. G. Obermeyer	1,074	48.8	+5.6
Majority		53	2.4	−11.2
Turnout		2,201	69.8	−12.7
South African hold		Swing	-5.6	

General election 1921: Potchefstroom
Party	Candidate	Votes	%	±%
National	J. G. Obermeyer	1,319	51.0	+2.2
South African	N. J. de Wet	1,269	49.0	−2.2
Majority		50	2.0	N/A
Turnout		2,588	73.6	+3.8
National gain from South African		Swing	+2.2	

General election 1924: Potchefstroom
Party	Candidate	Votes	%	±%
National	M. L. Fick	1,275	52.6	+1.6
South African	H. van der Merwe	1,146	47.2	−1.8
Rejected ballots		5	0.2	N/A
Majority		129	5.4	+3.4
Turnout		2,426	88.4	+14.8
National hold		Swing	+1.7	

General election 1929: Potchefstroom
Party	Candidate	Votes	%	±%
National	M. L. Fick	1,385	52.8	+0.2
South African	B. D. Pienaar	1,228	46.8	−0.4
Rejected ballots		12	0.4	+0.2
Majority		157	6.0	+0.6
Turnout		2,625	87.1	−1.3
National hold		Swing	+0.3	

=== Elections in the 1930s ===
General election 1933: Potchefstroom
Party	Candidate	Votes	%	±%
National	M. L. Fick	2,741	53.5	+0.7
Independent	G. Fleischack	2,333	45.6	New
Rejected ballots		47	0.9	+0.5
Majority		408	8.0	N/A
Turnout		5,121	75.5	−11.6
National hold		Swing	N/A	

General election 1938: Potchefstroom
Party	Candidate	Votes	%	±%
United	Hubert van der Merwe	3,217	61.0	+7.5
Purified National	W. J. de Klerk	2,032	38.5	New
Rejected ballots		23	0.5	-0.4
Majority		1,185	22.5	N/A
Turnout		5,272	84.7	+9.2
United hold		Swing	N/A	
