= Pieter Johannes Meyer =

Piet Meyer

Director- General of the South African Broadcasting Corporation (SABC)
- In office 1959–1980
- Preceded by: Roos, G.D.
- Succeeded by: de Villiers, S.

Chairman of the Afrikaner Broederbond
- In office 1960–1972
- Preceded by: Thom, H.B.
- Succeeded by: Treurnicht, A.P.

Chancellor of the Randse Afrikaanse Universiteit
- In office 1978–1983
- Preceded by: Diederichs, N.J.
- Succeeded by: Viljoen, G. vN.

Personal details
- Born: Pieter Johannes Meyer; 22 January 1909 Ladybrand, Orange River Colony, South Africa
- Died: 1984
- Spouse: Isabella Jacobs
- Education: University of the Free State, University of South Africa

Pieter Johannes Meyer (22 January 1909 - 1984), a South African, was an influential Afrikaner in the South African Broadcasting Corporation and chairman of the Afrikaner Broederbond.

== Roots ==
Meyer was born on 22 January 1909 in Ladybrand, Orange Free state, South Africa. Son of Izak Andries Meyer and Judith Jacoba van Huyssteen. He married Isabella Jacobs. He died in 1984.

== Education ==
He obtained a BA degree, a Higher Educational diploma, a MA(Psychology) and a M.Ed. from 1929 to 1934 at the University of the Free State in Bloemfontein. He studied at the Vrije universiteit in Amsterdam and completed his PhD at the University of South Africa in 1937.

== Career ==
In 1943 he open a publishing business, called L en S Boek & Kunsentrum. There after Meyer worked as a public relations officer at The Rembrandt Group. In 1959 he was appointed as director-general of the SABC, in which he remained until 1980. He was chairman of the Afrikaner Broederbond (AB) from 1960-1972. This was a secret white Afrikaner male organization. Meyer held a leading position in the Ossewabrandwag.

== Randse Afrikaanse University ==
As early as 1955, a committee was founded by Afrikaans cultural organizations to establish an Afrikaans university in Johannesburg. Meyer was chairman of the committee and Hennie Roux secretary. Meyer was in the management-leadership-team of the FAK. They hand over a report to the government and it was accepted and the university started in 1966. He was also the Chancellor of the University from 1978-1983. They honoured him with an honorary doctorate.

== SABC ==
When Meyer started in 1959 the Corporation only broadcasting 350 hours per week. At his retirement from the corporation it broadcast 1050 hours per week and had radio stations most indigenous languages. He has overseen the introduction of Television broadcasting in South Africa in 1976. In 1961 he visited 18 cities world-wide and interviewed experts on radio and television.

== The interest of the Afrikaner ==
Meyer had the interest of the Afrikaner at heart. He worked with Dr Albert Hertzog in the 1930s (as member of the National Party) to make sure that the Afrikaner mineworkers find a place in the trade unions. He was a key figure in establishing the Randse Afrikaanse Universiteit in 1966. Through his position in the Afrikaner Broederbond he was able to influence both the SABC and the Randse Afrikaanse Universiteit. In 1948 the South African Government declared Communism illegal. Churches formed an Anti-Communist Committee to protect Afrikaners against communism. Meyer was the second chairman of this committee replacing Diederichs, N.J. He was also a writer of books on history of the Afrikaner.

== Recognition ==
He received apart from the one given by Randse Afrikaanse Universiteit honorary doctorates from the University of the Free State and University of Pretoria. A bronze bust of him was erected in the foyer of the SABC’s head office building in Auckland Park Johannesburg, but it was later removed.
