= Conradie =

Conradie is a surname. Notable people with the surname include:

- Bolla Conradie (born 1978), South African rugby union footballer
- J. H. Conradie (1897–1966), South African politician, advocate and judge
- Louis Conradie (born 1996), South African rugby union player
- Pieter Conradie (born 1994), South African sprinter
- Wian Conradie (born 1994), Namibian rugby union player

The Conradies website: https://dieconradies.com
