= Henning Klopper =

South African politician (1895–1985)

Henning Johannes Klopper

Chairman of the Afrikaner Broederbond
- In office 1918–1924
- Preceded by: Office established
- Succeeded by: Nicol, W.

Speaker of the Parliament of South Africa
- In office 1961–1974
- Preceded by: Conradie, J.H.
- Succeeded by: Schlebusch, A.L.

Personal details
- Born: January 17, 1895 Heilbron, Orange Free State
- Died: November 20, 1985 (aged 90) Parys, Orange Free State, South Africa
- Spouse: Maria Alberta Cecilia Naude
- Children: 5
- Known for: Promoting Afrikaans and fighting White Afrikaner poverty

Henning Johannes Klopper (January 17, 1895 – November 20, 1985) was a South African politician who served as Speaker of the National Assembly, and the first chairman of the Afrikaner Broederbond. He was known for promoting Afrikaans and fighting White Afrikaner poverty in South Africa.

== Roots ==
Klopper was born on 17 January 1895 in Heilbron, Orange Free State. He was the son of Hendrik Belthasar Louis Klopper and Christina Catharina Johanna van Aswegen. After his schooling in Parys, at age 16 he joined the South African Railways and Harbours. He married Maria Alberta Cecilia Naudé. He died on 20 November 1985.

== Afrikaner Broederbond ==
On 5 June 1918, Klopper and three others namely: Jozua Francois Naudé, father of Beyers Naudé, (born 20 March 1873), Daniel Hendrik Celliers du Plessis, (born 12 Mar 1898) and Hendrik Willem van der Merwe, (born 1891) formed an organization called the Afrikaner Broederbond (translated it means "Afrikaner Brotherhood"). They were concerned about white Afrikaner poverty. This organization's aims were to protect the white Afrikaner interests and return it to its rightful place in South Africa. He was the first chairman. When the Conservative party was formed in 1983, Klopper joined them and was then forced to leave the organization.

== Afrikaanse Taal- en Kultuurvereniging ==
The Afrikaanse Taal- en Kultuurvereniging, ATKV, "Afrikaans Language and Cultural Union" is an organization created out of White Afrikaner workers from the South African Railways and Harbours. It was founded on 19 August 1930 in Cape Town. It was founded to stop the erosion of White Afrikaner culture, language and religion. Klopper was chairman of this organization. It helped with the relief that could be given to White Afrikaner poverty.

== Leader of the symbolic 1938 Ossewa trek ==
Kloppers, as chairman of the ATKV was a chief organiser of the 1938 Ossewa trek, a centenary remembrance of The Great Trek. The Great Trek was a migration of Afrikaners in ox-wagons from the Cape Province to the northern hinterland to escape British rule.

== Speaker of parliament of South Africa ==
He became a member of parliament in 1943 by winning the election in Vredefort, as member of the National Party. He became speaker of parliament in 1961. He stayed speaker until 1974. He served under two prime ministers, namely Hendrik Verwoerd and John Vorster.
