= Afrikaner Broederbond =

1918–1994 Afrikaner Calvinist male organisation in South Africa

The Afrikaner Broederbond (AB) or simply the Broederbond was an exclusively Afrikaner Calvinist and male secret society in South Africa dedicated to the advancement of the Afrikaner people. It was founded by H. J. Klopper, H.W. van der Merwe, D. H. C. du Plessis and the Rev. Jozua Naudé in 1918 as Jong Zuid Afrika (Dutch: Young South Africa) until 1920, when it was renamed the Broederbond. Its influence within South African political and social life came to a climax with the 1948-1994 rule of the white supremacist National Party and its policy of apartheid, which was largely developed and implemented by Broederbond members. Between 1948 and 1994, many prominent figures of Afrikaner political, cultural, and religious life, including every leader of the South African government, were members of the Afrikaner Broederbond.

== Origins ==
Described later as an "inner sanctum", "an immense informal network of influence", and by Jan Smuts as a "dangerous, cunning, political fascist organization", in 1920 Jong Zuid Afrika, now restyled as the Afrikaner Broederbond, was a group of 37 white men of Afrikaner ethnicity, Afrikaans language, and Calvinist faith, who shared cultural, semi-religious, and deeply political objectives based on traditions and experiences dating back to the arrival of Dutch white settlers, French Huguenots, and German settlers at the Cape in the 17th and 18th centuries, and including the dramatic events of the Great Trek in the 1830s and 1840s. Ivor Wilkins and Hans Strydom recount how, on the occasion of its 50th anniversary, a leading broeder (brother or member) said:

for understandable reasons it was difficult to explain [our] aims…[I]n the beginning people were allowed in…who thought it was just another cultural society.

— Wilkins & Strydom, 1980, p.45

The precise intentions of the founders are not clear. Some considered that the group was intended to counter the dominance of the British Empire and the English language, whilst others considered that the purpose was to redeem the Afrikaners after their defeat in the Second Anglo-Boer War. Another view is that it sought to protect culture, build an economy and seize control of the government. The remarks of the organisation's chairman in 1944 offer a slightly different, and possibly more accurate interpretation in the context of the post-Boer War and post-World War I era, when Afrikaners were suffering through a maelstrom of social and political changes: The Afrikaner Broederbond was born out of the deep conviction that the Afrikaners had been planted in the country by the Hand of God, destined to survive as a separate people with its own calling.

The traditional, deeply pious Calvinism of the Afrikaners, a pastoral people with a difficult history in South Africa since the mid-17th century, supplied an element of Christian predestination that led to a determination to wrest the country from the English-speaking population of British descent and place its future in the hands of the Afrikaans-speaking Afrikaners. To the old thirst for sovereignty that had prompted the Great Trek into the interior from 1838 on, would be added a new thirst for total independence and nationalism. These two threads merged to form a "Christian National" civil religion that would dominate South African life from 1948 to 1994.

The emergence of the Broederbond took place amidst the backdrop of a rise in Afrikaner nationalism as a result of the Second Boer War (1899–1902), which saw the British annex the South African Republic and the Orange Free State. During the conflict, the British deployed scorched earth tactics against the Boers, destroying Boer farms and interning captured Boer non-combatants in concentration camps, where roughly 27,000 Boers died. The war was brought to end by the Treaty of Vereeniging, which though generous in its terms was seen by the Boers as deeply humiliating. The anglicisation policies of British administrator Lord Milner was also a major source of resentment amongst the Afrikaners. These developments led to an increase in nationalistic sentiments amongst Afrikaners, leading to the formation of the Broederbond and the National Party.

The National Party had been established in 1914 by Afrikaner nationalists. They first came to power in 1924. Ten years later, its leader J. B. M. Hertzog and Jan Smuts of the South African Party merged their parties to form the United Party. This angered a contingent of hardline nationalists under D. F. Malan, who broke away to form the Purified National Party. By the time World War II broke out, resentment towards the British had not subsided. Malan's party opposed South Africa's entry into the war on the side of the British; some of its members wanted to support Nazi Germany. Jan Smuts had commanded British Army forces in the East African theater of the First World War and was amenable to backing the Allies a second time. This was the spark Afrikaner nationalism needed. Hertzog, who was in favour of neutrality, resigned from the United Party when a narrow majority in his cabinet backed Smuts. He started the Afrikaner Party which would amalgamate later with D.F. Malan's "Purified National Party" to become the force that would take over South African politics for the next 46 years, until majority rule and Nelson Mandela's election in 1994.

In 1945, Smuts denounced the Broederbond as a fascist organization and ordered South African civil servants and state schoolteachers to either forfeit their Broederbond membership immediately or resign from their jobs.

== The Broederbond and apartheid ==
Every prime minister and state president in South Africa from 1948 to the end of apartheid in 1994 was a member of the Afrikaner Broederbond.

Once the Herenigde Nasionale Party was in power...English-speaking bureaucrats, soldiers, and state employees were sidelined by reliable Afrikaners, with key posts going to Broederbond members (with their ideological commitment to separatism). The electoral system itself was manipulated to reduce the impact of immigrant English speakers and eliminate that of Coloureds.

The Herenigde Nationale Party was the product of the reunion of the Purified National Party and the United Party in 1940.

The Afrikaner Broederbond continued to act in secret, infiltrating and gaining control of the few organisations, such as the South African Agricultural Union (SAAU), which had political power and were opposed to a further escalation of apartheid policies.

Members of political parties right of the National Party were not welcome and 200 members were expelled by 1972.

In 1983 when the Conservative Party was founded with Andries Treurnicht as a leader, all members who belonged to the newly formed party were no longer welcome. Treurnicht, C.W.H. Boshoff and H.J. Klopper, previous chairmen, left the organization. Other members like H. J. van den Bergh and P.W. Botha also eventually left.

By 1985 the Afrikaner Broederbond had realised that the policy of Apartheid was unsustainable. Although the African National Congress was banned, the Broederbond decided to start initial discussions with them. On 8 June 1986 chairman Pieter de Lange met Thabo Mbeki in New York for a five-hour meeting held at a conference organised by the Ford Foundation. The meeting was just between De Lange and Mbeki, but at the conference other ANC members Mac Maharaj, Seretse Choabi, Charles Villa-Vicencio, and Peggy Dulany were present.

== Leaders ==
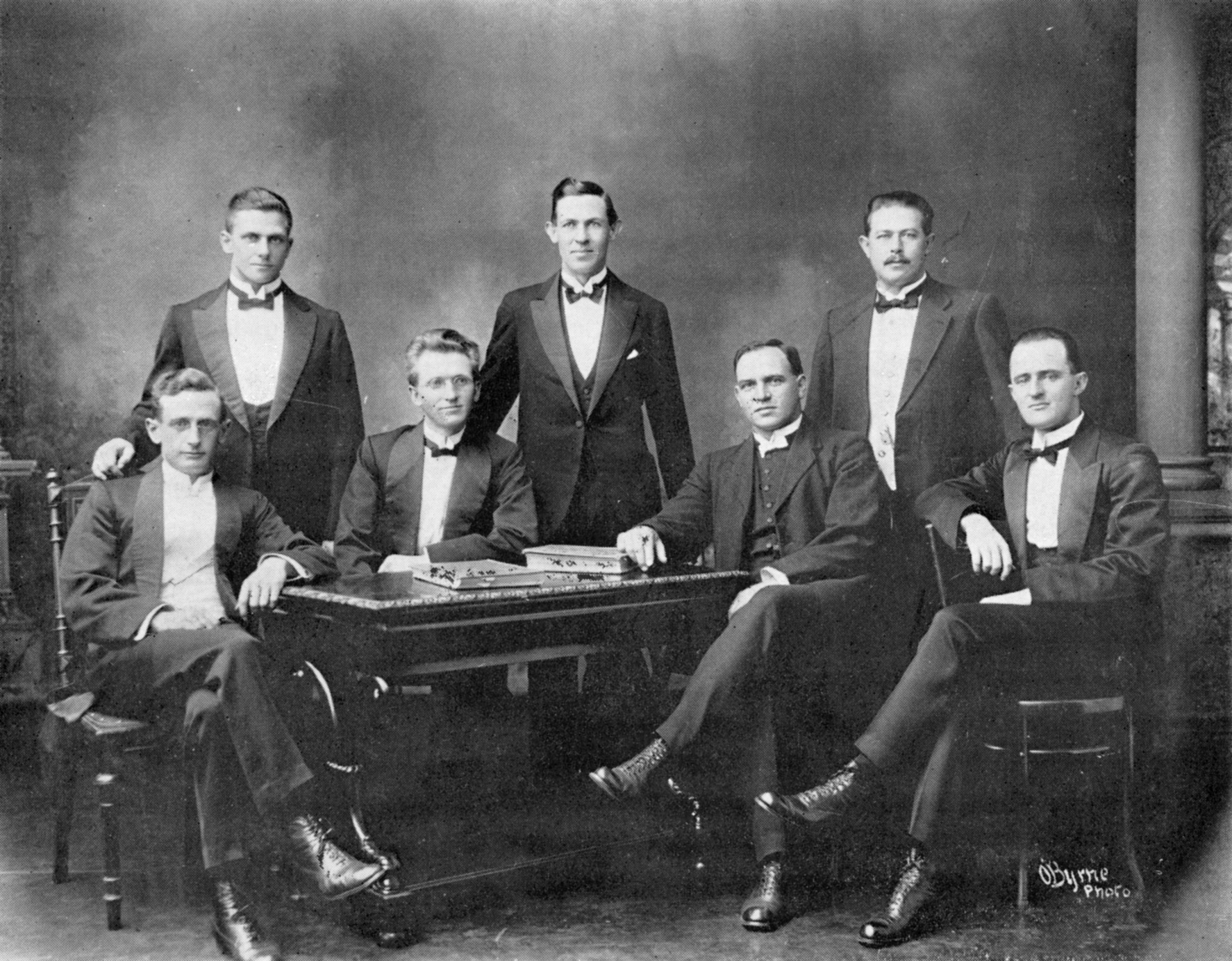
Afrikaner Broederbond leadership in 1918

The chairmen of the Broederbond were:

Name	From	To	
Henning Klopper	1918	1924	Left the organization
William Nicol	1924	1925	
Johan Hendrik Greijbe	1925	1928	
J. W. Potgieter	1928	1930	
Lodewicus du Plessis	1930	1932	Left the organization
Johannes Cornelis van Rooy	1932	1938	
Nicolaas Diederichs	1938	1942	
Johannes Cornelis van Rooy	1942	1952	
H. B. Thom	1952	1960	
Pieter Johannes Meyer	1960	1972	
Andries Treurnicht	1972	1974	Left the organization
Gerrit Viljoen	1974	1980	
Carel Boshoff	1980	1983	Left the organization
Pieter de Lange	1983	1993	
Tom de Beer	1993	1994	

== Exposed ==
Although the press had maintained a steady trickle of unsourced exposés of the inner workings and membership of the Broederbond since the 1960s, the first comprehensive exposé of the organisation was a book written by Ivor Wilkins and Hans Strydom, The Super-Afrikaners. Inside the Afrikaner Broederbond, first published in 1978. The most notable and discussed section of the book was the last section which consisted of a near-comprehensive list of 7,500 Broederbond members. The Broederbond was portrayed as Die Stigting Adriaan Delport (The Adriaan Delport Foundation) in the 1968 South African feature film Die Kandidaat (The Candidate), directed by Jans Rautenbach and produced by Emil Nofal.

== Companies with Broederbond credentials ==
- ABSA, formed by an amalgamation of United, Allied, Trust and Volkskas banks, the latter of which was established by the Broederbond in 1934 and whose chairman was also the Broederbond chairman at the time.
- ADS, formerly Altech Defence Systems.
- Remgro, formerly Rembrandt Ltd., former holding company of Volkskas.

== Notable members ==
- Theunis Roux Botha, Former and last Rector of the Randse Afrikaanse Universiteit.
- D. F. Malan (1874–1959), former Prime Minister (1948–1954).
- H. F. Verwoerd (1901–1966), former Prime Minister.
- J. G. Strijdom (1893–1958), former Prime Minister (1954–1958).
- B. J. Vorster (1915–1983), former Prime Minister (1966–1978) and State President (1978–1979).
- J. S. Gericke, Vice-Chancellor Stellenbosch University.
- Pik Botha, former Minister of Foreign Affairs.
- H. B. Thom, historian and former Rector of Stellenbosch University.
- G.L.P. Moerdijk, Afrikaans architect best known for designing the Voortrekker Monument in Pretoria.
- Tienie Groenewald, retired Defence Force general.
- Barend Johannes van der Walt, former ambassador to Canada.
- Pieter Johannes Potgieter Stofberg, former politician, billionaire businessman and famous doctor.
- P. W. Botha, former Minister of Defence and Prime Minister. He left the Broederbond.
- Anton Rupert, billionaire entrepreneur and businessman; a member in the 1940s, but eventually dismissed it as an "absurdity" and left the organization.
- Marthinus van Schalkwyk, a former member of the youth wing of the Broederbond, the last leader of the National Party and former minister of tourism in the ANC government of Jacob Zuma.
- Tom de Beer, recruited 30 years ago, now chairman of new Afrikanerbond.
- Nico Smith, Dutch Reformed Church missionary who, as a former insider, wrote retrospectively about the Afrikaner Broederbond in a book.
- F. W. De Klerk, former South African State President and leader of the National Party.
- "Lang" Hendrik van den Bergh, the South African head of state security apparatus during the Apartheid regime, and close friend of former South African Prime Minister B. J. Vorster. He left the Bond.

== See also ==
- Anglo-Saxon Clubs of America
- Knights of the White Camelia
- Propaganda Due
