= 1992 South African apartheid referendum =

"Yes" vote by white South Africans to abolish apartheid

- 17 March 1992
- Do you support continuation of the reform process which the State President began on 2 February 1990 and which is aimed at a new Constitution through negotiation? Ondersteun u die voortsetting van die hervormingsproses wat die Staatspresident op 2 Februarie 1990 begin het en wat op ‘n nuwe grondwet deur onderhandeling gemik is?

Results
| Choice | Votes | % |
|---|---|---|
| Yes | 1,924,186 | 68.73% |
| No | 875,619 | 31.27% |
| Valid votes | 2,799,805 | 99.82% |
| Invalid or blank votes | 5,142 | 0.18% |
| Total votes | 2,804,947 | 100.00% |
| Registered voters/turnout | 3,296,800 | 85.08% |
- Results by region

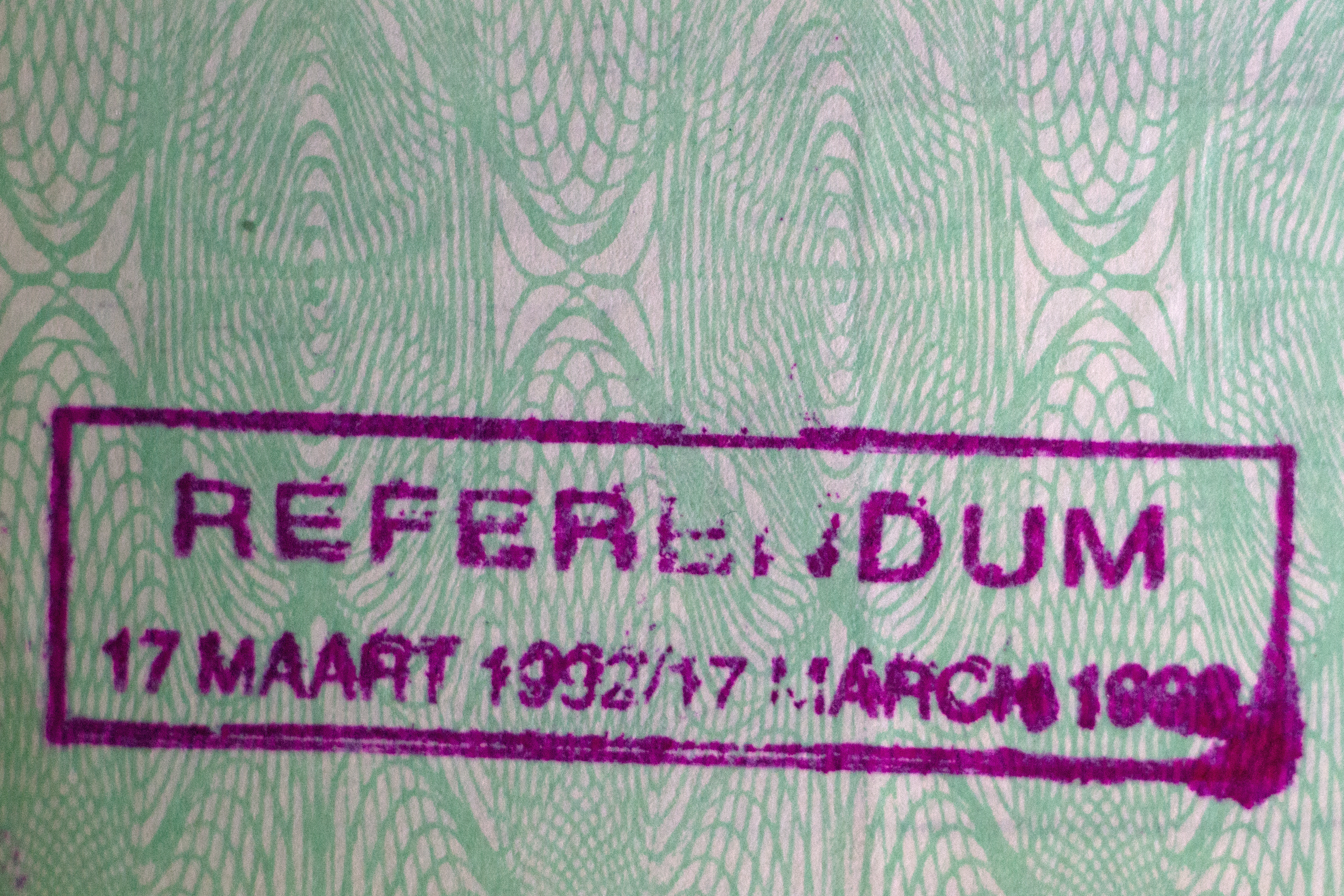
Stamp in identity document of a white South African recording their participation in the 1992 apartheid referendum

External videos
- SABC news report about polling day, YouTube video

A referendum on ending apartheid was held in South Africa on 17 March 1992. The referendum was limited to white South African voters, who were asked whether or not they supported the negotiated reforms begun by State President F. W. de Klerk two years earlier, in which he proposed to end the apartheid system that had been implemented since 1948. The result of the election was a landslide victory for the "yes" side, which ultimately resulted in apartheid being lifted. This was the last occasion in which only the white electorate took part. Universal suffrage was introduced two years later for the country's first non-racial elections.

== Background ==
On 2 February 1990, in his opening address to parliament, State President F. W. de Klerk announced that the ban on certain political parties such as the African National Congress and the South African Communist Party would be lifted and that Nelson Mandela would be released after 27 years in prison. De Klerk announced that capital punishment would be suspended and that the state of emergency would be lifted. The State President said in his speech to parliament that "the time to negotiate has arrived".

Nelson Mandela was released on 11 February 1990 from Victor Verster Prison in Paarl near Cape Town. On 21 March 1990 South West Africa became independent as Namibia. In May the government began talks with the ANC. In June the state of emergency was lifted and the ANC had agreed to a ceasefire. In 1991 the Acts which restricted land ownership, specified separate living areas and classified people by race were abolished.

=== Before the referendum ===
Prior to the referendum, the governing National Party had lost three by-elections after announcing negotiations to end apartheid two years earlier, and its position was opposed by the Conservative Party which was against the negotiations and boycotted the Convention for a Democratic South Africa (CODESA). On 24 January 1992 President de Klerk opened parliament and suggested that a referendum would be held, in which the vote of each race group would be counted separately. When the National Party was defeated in the Potchefstroom by-election on 19 February, after calling it a test vote, its credibility was placed in doubt.

In the meantime, negotiations between the government and the African National Congress were making slow progress. Violence was increasing in the South African townships, different right wing groups were becoming more prominent, and there was growing dissatisfaction within the white community. Conditions and the mood in the black townships was worsening as well. The government was thus under domestic and international pressure to make progress in the negotiations.

While the Conservative Party claimed that the government did not have the mandate to negotiate with the ANC after its defeat in Potchefstroom, State President F. W. de Klerk announced 20 February, that a national referendum for the white electorate would be held to test the government's—and his own—support: if the referendum's outcome had been negative, de Klerk would have resigned and general elections held. When de Klerk initially announced the referendum, many were critical of the fact that only whites had the right to vote in the referendum.

== Referendum areas ==
For the purposes of the referendum South Africa was divided into fifteen areas consisting of groups of House of Assembly electoral divisions.

| Province | Area | Electoral Divisions | | | |
|---|---|---|---|---|---|
| Province | Area | Electoral Divisions | Cape Province | Beaufort West (Note: Beaufort West, Ceres, Graaff-Reinet and Prieska) | 4 |
| Cape Town (Note: Bellville, Caledon, Cape Town Gardens, Claremont, Constantia, De Kuilen, Durbanville, False Bay, Green Point, Groote Schuur, Helderberg, Maitland, Malmesbury, Namaqualand, Paarl, Parow, Piketberg, Pinelands, Sea Point, Simon's Town, Stellenbosch, Tygervallei, Vasco, Walvis Bay, Wellington, Worcester and Wynberg) | 27 | | Cape Province | | |
| East London (Note: Albany, Aliwal, Cradock, East London City, East London North, King William's Town and Queenstown) | 7 | | Cape Province | | |
| George (Note: George, Mossel Bay, Oudtshoorn and Swellendam) | 4 | | Cape Province | | |
| Kimberley (Note: De Aar, Gordonia, Kimberley North, Kimberley South, Kuruman and Vryburg) | 6 | | Cape Province | | |
| Port Elizabeth (Note: Algoa, Humansdorp, Newton Park, Port Elizabeth Central, Port Elizabeth North, Sundays River, Uitenhage and Walmer) | 8 | | Cape Province | | |
| Natal | Durban (Note: Amanzimtoti, Berea, Durban Central, Durban North, Durban Point, Greytown, Pinetown, Port Natal, South Coast, Umbilo, Umfolozi, Umhlanga, Umhlatuzana and Umlazi) | 14 | | | |
| Natal | Pietermaritzburg (Note: Klip River, Mooi River, Newcastle, Pietermaritzburg North, Pietermaritzburg South and Vryheid) | 6 | | | |
| Orange Free State | Bloemfontein (Note: Bloemfontein East, Bloemfontein North, Bloemfontein West, Fauresmith, Ladybrand, Smithfield and Winburg) | 7 | | | |
| Orange Free State | Kroonstad (Note: Bethlehem, Heilbron, Kroonstad, Parys, Sasolburg, Virginia and Welkom) | 7 | | | |
| Transvaal | Germiston (Note: Benoni, Boksburg, Brakpan, Brentwood, Edenvale, Geduld, Germiston, Germiston District, Kempton Park, Modderfontein, Nigel, Primrose and Springs) | 13 | | | |
| Transvaal | Johannesburg (Note: Alberton, Bezuidenhout, Bryanston, Hillbrow, Houghton, Jeppe, Johannesburg North, Johannesburg West, Langlaagte, Meyerton, North Rand, Overvaal, Parktown, Randburg, Rosettenville, Sandton, Turffontein, Vanderbijlpark, Vereeniging, Westdene and Yeoville) | 21 | | | |
| Transvaal | Pietersburg (Note: Lydenburg, Pietersburg, Potgietersrus, Soutpansberg and Waterberg) | 5 | | | |
| Transvaal | Pretoria (Note: Barberton, Bethal, Brits, Delmas, Ermelo, Gezina, Hercules, Innesdal, Koedoespoort, Middelburg, Nelspruit, Pretoria Central, Pretoria East, Pretoria West, Rissik, Roodeplaat, Rustenburg, Standerton, Sunnyside, Verwoerdburg, Waterkloof, Witbank and Wonderboom) | 23 | | | |
| Transvaal | Roodepoort (Note: Carletonville, Florida, Helderkruin, Klerksdorp, Krugersdorp, Lichtenburg, Losberg, Maraisburg, Potchefstroom, Randfontein, Roodepoort, Schweizer-Reneke, Stilfontein and Ventersdorp) | 14 | | | |

== Campaign ==
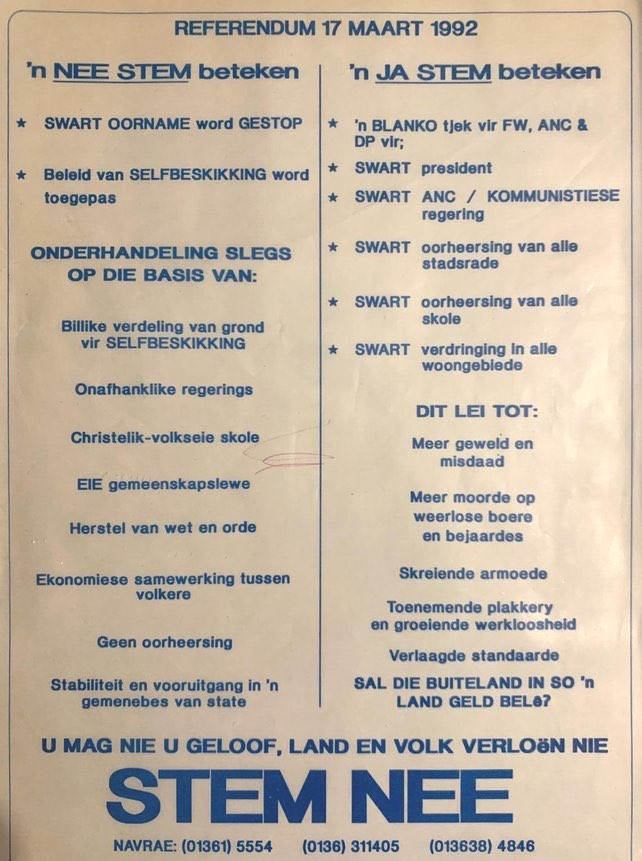
Vote 'No" poster from the referendum

| For a 'Yes' vote | For a 'No' vote |
|---|---|
| National Party; Democratic Party | Conservative Party; Herstigte Nasionale Party |

The National Party and Democratic Party campaigned for a "Yes" vote, while the conservative right wing led by the Conservative Party campaigned for a "No" vote. Much of de Klerk's efforts in 1992 were directed toward appeasing and weakening his right-wing opponents, the conservative defenders of apartheid who had broken away from the National Party during the 1980s. De Klerk attempted to show white South Africans that the government was not giving up power to the ANC, but negotiating on the basis of "power sharing". It warned the white voters that a "No" vote would mean continuation of international sanctions, the danger of civil war and worsening chaos in South Africa.

De Klerk told the press that he would interpret a majority "Yes" vote as a mandate to enter into binding agreements with the ANC and other black leaders, without further approval from white voters. He stated that a second referendum to approve the terms of the constitutional settlement would not be necessary unless they differed "substantially" from the government's promises. These promises included a bill of rights, separation of powers between the branches of government, an independent judiciary, and a Parliament consisting of two houses.

The National Party "Yes" vote campaign was of a kind that had never before been seen in South Africa. The National Party held large political gatherings through the country and published advertisements in many national newspapers and bought commercial time in television. It produced massive election "Yes" posters with the message "Yes! Ja! SA" and a poster showing a picture of an AWB member with a gun and with the text "You can stop this man! Vote YES". The Democratic Party had more traditional posters with the message "Ja vir vrede (Yes for peace)".

The "No" campaign, led by Andries Treurnicht warned of "black majority rule" and "ANC communist rule". The Conservative Party also advocated white self-determination and argued that white South Africans had the right to rule themselves. During the campaign, the "No" side also started to advocate an independent homeland, or Volkstaat, for the white minority.

The "Yes" campaign had a significant advantage, as it was backed by the government, the opposition Democratic Party, the media, the international community and the vast majority of commercial and business organisations. According to the Center for Strategic and International Studies:

In the referendum campaign the National Party had all the advantages. Television and (in many parts of the country) radio are government controlled. The business community raised money, and most newspapers helped by giving discount rates to the "yes" advertisements… The Conservative Party, with no comparable funds and no access to discounts, was effectively locked out of the mass media, relying on posters to get its message across.

== Results ==
Do you support continuation of the reform process which the State President began on 2 February 1990 and which is aimed at a new Constitution through negotiation?

| Choice | Votes | % |
|---|---|---|
| For | 1,924,186 | 68.73 |
| Against | 875,610 | 31.27 |
| Total | 2,799,796 | 100.00 |
| Valid votes | 2,799,796 | 99.82 |
| Invalid/blank votes | 5,142 | 0.18 |
| Total votes | 2,804,938 | 100.00 |
| Registered voters/turnout | 3,296,800 | 85.08 |

=== By region ===
In Cape Town and Durban 85% voted "yes" and in Pretoria over 57% voted "yes". Only Pietersburg in the Northern Transvaal, a rural right-wing stronghold, voted "no" with 57%. Even in Kroonstad, a conservative stronghold where five out of the seven parliamentary seats were held by "no" campaigners, the "yes" side won with 52%.

| Province | Area | For | | Against | | Total valid votes |
| Province | Area | Votes | % | Votes | % | Total valid votes |
|---|---|---|---|---|---|---|
| Cape Province | Beaufort West | 18,941 | 61.62 | 11,798 | 38.38 | 30,739 |
| Cape Province | Cape Town | 355,527 | 84.88 | 63,325 | 15.12 | 418,852 |
| Cape Province | East London | 66,675 | 78.28 | 18,498 | 21.72 | 85,173 |
| Cape Province | George | 40,075 | 65.39 | 21,211 | 34.61 | 61,286 |
| Cape Province | Kimberley | 33,504 | 54.48 | 27,993 | 45.52 | 61,497 |
| Cape Province | Port Elizabeth | 87,216 | 74.46 | 29,909 | 25.54 | 117,125 |
| Natal | Durban | 204,371 | 85.03 | 35,975 | 14.97 | 240,346 |
| Natal | Pietermaritzburg | 66,500 | 75.98 | 21,023 | 24.02 | 87,523 |
| Orange Free State | Bloemfontein | 58,066 | 58.60 | 41,017 | 41.40 | 99,083 |
| Orange Free State | Kroonstad | 54,531 | 51.54 | 51,279 | 48.46 | 105,810 |
| Transvaal | Germiston | 164,025 | 65.38 | 86,844 | 34.62 | 250,869 |
| Transvaal | Johannesburg | 324,686 | 78.30 | 89,957 | 21.70 | 414,643 |
| Transvaal | Pietersburg | 37,612 | 43.02 | 49,820 | 56.98 | 87,432 |
| Transvaal | Pretoria | 287,720 | 57.37 | 213,825 | 42.63 | 501,545 |
| Transvaal | Roodepoort | 124,737 | 52.44 | 113,145 | 47.56 | 237,882 |

== Aftermath ==
The day after the referendum President de Klerk said "Today we have closed the book on apartheid" as he celebrated his 56th birthday. Nelson Mandela said that he was "very happy indeed". The Cape Times news bill was dominated by the large text "IT'S YES".

The alliance between the Conservative Party (CP) and the Afrikaner Weerstandsbeweging may have harmed the CP and in some cases even scared away voters to the "Yes" side. Some conservative and militant defenders of apartheid boycotted the referendum, although turnout was at record levels, reaching above 96% in some areas.

De Klerk and his government could now claim that the whites were in favour of universal suffrage and that they had a clear mandate to negotiate with the African National Congress. The ANC had initially disapproved the referendum, mainly because whites were the only ones allowed to vote. But since a "No" vote would not only risk the negotiations but also increase the political chaos in the country, and since it had no reason to advocate that whites oppose the negotiations, the ANC advocated a "Yes" vote.

Right-wing groups criticised the referendum and accused the government of electoral fraud. They had lost where they had previously been the strongest, in the Afrikaner heartland and in the big cities. However, no evidence has ever been put forward regarding electoral irregularities. Treurnicht claimed that media propaganda, foreign intervention, threats by businesspeople against employees, and electoral fraud had resulted in a "Yes" vote.

As it was, in percentage terms the referendum outcome closely followed the results of the 1989 House of Assembly election, with the "Yes" and "No" sides polling results very similar to the combined regional shares respectively obtained by NP + DP and CP + HNP two and a half years earlier:

| Province | Area | NP + DP (Yes) | | CP + HNP (No) | |
| Province | Area | Votes | % | Votes | % |
|---|---|---|---|---|---|
| Cape Province | Beaufort West | 18,184 | 62.21 | 11,045 | 37.79 |
| Cape Province | Cape Town | 274,680 | 91.10 | 26,822 | 8.90 |
| Cape Province | East London | 60,070 | 86.93 | 9,029 | 13.07 |
| Cape Province | George | 30,838 | 65.82 | 16,013 | 34.18 |
| Cape Province | Kimberley | 29,429 | 55.69 | 23,412 | 44.31 |
| Cape Province | Port Elizabeth | 67,453 | 75.94 | 21,368 | 24.06 |
| Natal | Durban | 152,303 | 89.91 | 16,848 | 9.95 |
| Natal | Pietermaritzburg | 57,817 | 78.10 | 16,211 | 21.90 |
| Orange Free State | Bloemfontein | 47,323 | 56.69 | 36,158 | 43.31 |
| Orange Free State | Kroonstad | 50,067 | 50.47 | 49,143 | 49.53 |
| Transvaal | Germiston | 129,291 | 63.36 | 74,309 | 36.42 |
| Transvaal | Johannesburg | 207,191 | 75.22 | 68,092 | 24.72 |
| Transvaal | Pietersburg | 32,338 | 42.88 | 43,073 | 57.12 |
| Transvaal | Pretoria | 209,134 | 53.94 | 178,535 | 46.05 |
| Transvaal | Roodepoort | 109,549 | 52.25 | 100,128 | 47.75 |

On 27 April 1994 South Africa held its first non-racial elections, which resulted in a huge victory for the African National Congress and made Nelson Mandela the first black President of South Africa.

== See also ==
- Convention for a Democratic South Africa
- 1979 Rhodesian constitutional referendum

== Bibliography ==
- Nelson Mandela, Long Walk to Freedom: The Autobiography of Nelson Mandela; Little Brown & Co; ISBN 0-316-54818-9 (paperback, 1995)
