= Louis le Grange =

Cabinet Minister of South Africa
- In office 1978–1986
- President: Marais Viljoen
- Prime Minister: John Vorster; P. W. Botha

Speaker of the House of Assembly of South Africa
- In office 1987–1991
- President: F.W. de Klerk
- Preceded by: Johan Greeff
- Succeeded by: Gene Louw

Personal details
- Born: 16 August 1928 Ladybrand, Orange Free State,^{[a]} South Africa
- Died: 25 October 1991 (aged 63) Potchefstroom, Orange Free State,^{[b]} South Africa
- Citizenship: South African citizenship
- Party: National Party
- Spouse: Jessie Ortlepp-Marais (m. 1952)
- Education: Potchefstroom University for Christian Higher Education
- a. Now the Free State; b. Now North West

Louis le Grange (16 August 1928 – 25 October 1991) was a lawyer, a South African politician and a member of the National Party.

== Early life ==
Le Grange was born to Elizabeth Raats and Johannes Jacobus Le Grange in Ladybrand in the Orange Free State of South Africa. He attended primary school in Fochville and Potchefstroom and matriculated Potchefstroom Hoer Volkskool in 1946. After matriculating, he joined the Department of Interior and Justice in 1947 as clerk while studying for a Bachelor of Arts from the University of South Africa, obtaining it in 1953. He left to become an attorney in partnership, obtaining his Attorneys' Admission Diploma in 1955 and an LL.B. in 1956. He received a BA Honours in Political Science in 1964 from the University of Potchefstroom.

== Political career ==
He came from a politically active family, his mother a secretary of the National Party's Kimberley branch in 1915, while his father had stood as an independent in Losberg in 1938. He was a member of the National Party, Member of Parliament for the constituency of Potchefstroom (1966-1991), Deputy Minister of Information (1975-1978), Interior (1975-1978), Immigration (1978), and Public Works (1978), in governments of John Vorster.

He then served as Minister of Tourism and Public Works (1978-1979), Prisons (1979-1980), Police (1979-1982) and Law and Order (1982-1986) in the cabinets of P.W. Botha, before he became the 13th Speaker of the House of Assembly of South Africa (1987-1991).

== Marriage ==
He married Jessie Ortlepp-Marais in May 1952, and had two sons and two daughters.

== Death ==
He died of a heart attack in Potchefstroom, aged 63.
