= Rand Afrikaans University =

South African university (1967–2004)

Coordinates: 26°11′05″S 27°59′51″E

- Randse Afrikaanse Universiteit
- Motto: Diens Deur Kennis
- Motto in English: Service through knowledge
- Type: Public university
- Active: 24 February 1968–2004
- Location: Johannesburg, Gauteng, South Africa
- Language: Afrikaans, English
- Colours: Green and Grey
- Nickname: RAU

The Rand Afrikaans University (RAU) (Afrikaans: Randse Afrikaanse Universiteit) was a prominent South African institution of higher education and research that served the greater Johannesburg area and surroundings from 1967 to 2004. It has since merged with the Technikon Witwatersrand and two campuses of Vista University to form the University of Johannesburg.

== History ==
=== Origins ===
In the two decades after the Second Boer War, the flow of impoverished Afrikaners from the countryside to the Witwatersrand grew without a significant increase in the number of Afrikaans speakers, as is evident from the fact that the congregations of Afrikaans churches in Johannesburg showed almost no growth. That an entire generation of Afrikaners on the Rand was lost and Anglicised during this time was due, among other things, to the lack of Afrikaans educational institutions.

The picture only began to change from the 1920s and especially during the Great Depression when the first Afrikaans high schools on the Rand opened – Hoërskool Voortrekker in Boksburg in January 1920, Hoërskool Helpmekaar in Braamfontein and Hoërskool Monument in Krugersdorp in 1921. Shortly after the Second World War, there were only six Afrikaans-medium high schools on the Witwatersrand, compared to 26 English-medium high schools.

The growth of Afrikaans-medium high schools gradually began to reflect the population growth of Afrikaans first language speakers. The number of Afrikaners on the Rand grew by 167 percent between 1936 and 1960, compared to 60 percent in South Africa as a whole.

Compared to English-speaking South Africans, however, the intellectual potential of this large population concentration was underutilised, for social and economic reasons. In South Africa as a whole, the percentage of English speakers who matriculated or obtained an academic degree was twice as large as the percentage of Afrikaans speakers. On the Rand, the Afrikaners were even further behind on this metric, as many Afrikaans learners left high school before matriculating, while many matriculants could not afford to pursue tertiary academic education at a university.

=== Establishment ===
It became clear to Afrikaner leaders in the 1950s that higher education institutions had to be established within easier reach of Afrikaans speakers in the Rand, to enable both part-time study, for students who were already in employment, and full-time study for students who were still living in their parents' homes. The long campaign for an Afrikaans education college or university was conducted in three phases. The first campaign between 1956 and 1961 reached its peak with the establishment of the Goudstadse Onderwyskollege in February 1961. During the second phase between 1961 and 1965, negotiations were held with the University of South Africa (Unisa). The final campaign in 1965 and 1966 was aimed at obtaining its own, independent Afrikaans-medium university.

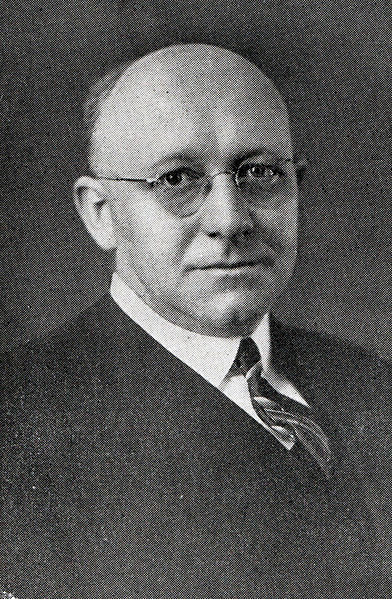
Nico Diederichs, first Chancellor.

While local communities outside Johannesburg also insisted on the establishment of an Afrikaans university, the policy of the then-white government was to expand existing white institutions of tertiary education to meet the growing needs rather than to establish new universities. It was not until the announcement on 13 February 1963 of the establishment of a new, bilingual university in Port Elizabeth that this policy was changed, especially in light of the findings of a commission of inquiry appointed by the Minister of Education. On 5 November 1963, 468 delegates unanimously decided at a congress to establish an Afrikaans university.

It was also proposed to negotiate with Unisa to move its seat from Pretoria to Johannesburg to exercise a dual function there – that of a residential Afrikaans university and that of an external university. The government's reluctance to proceed with the establishment of entirely new universities could thus be circumvented.

On 4 August 1965, the then Minister of Education, Jan de Klerk, announced that the Cabinet had decided that Unisa's seat would remain in Pretoria and had given its consent to the proposed establishment of an independent Afrikaans-medium university for the Witwatersrand, with its seat in Johannesburg. In 1966, the Cabinet decided on a campus site in Auckland Park.

The first students registered on 3 February 1968, and on 24 February of that year the Rand Afrikaans University was officially opened with just over 700 registered students, and the inauguration of its first Chancellor (the then Minister of Finance and later third State President of South Africa), Nico Diederichs, and Vice Chancellor, Gerrit Viljoen.

== Campus ==
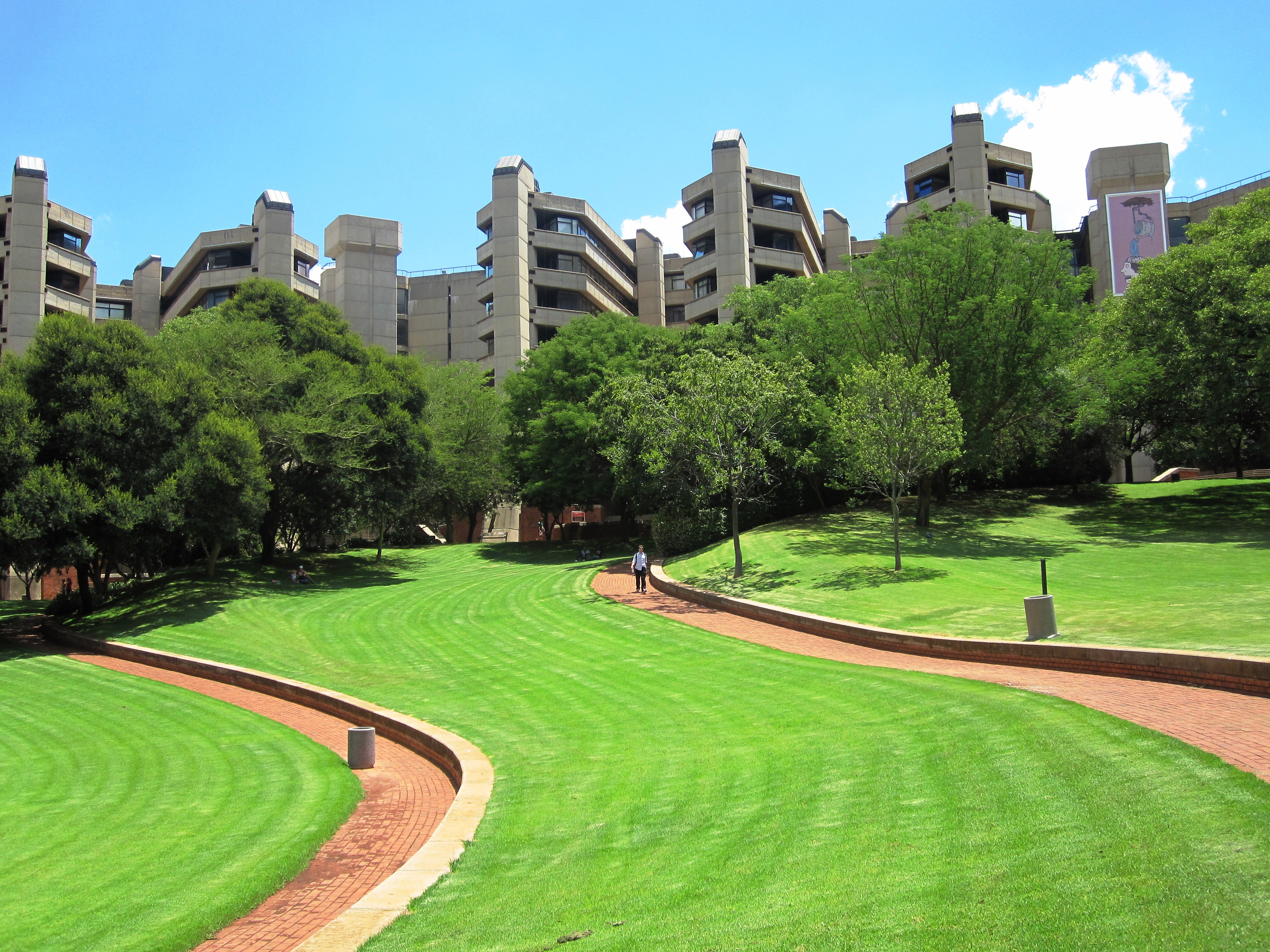
Rand Afrikaans University campus buildings.

Initially, the campus was temporarily located in Braamfontein, but the new campus and newly constructed brutalist buildings in Auckland Park were officially opened on 24 May 1975. The land for the campus is a former golf course acquired from the Country Club Johannesburg.

== Faculties ==
The faculties of RAU were as follows:

- Faculty of Commerce and Economics
- Faculty of Law
- Faculty of Science
- Faculty of Engineering
- Faculty of Arts
- Faculty of Health Sciences
- Faculty of Education and Nursing

== Leaders ==
Rector of the university

Surname	Name	From	To
Viljoen	G. vN.	1966	1979
de Lange	J. P.	1979	1987
Crouse	C. F.	1987	1995
van der Walt	J. C.	1995	2001
Botha	T. R.	2002	2005

Chancellor of the university

Surname	Name	From	To
Diederichs	N. J.	1966	1978
Meyer	P. J.	1978	1983
Viljoen	G. vN.	1983	2000

== Merger ==
On 1 January 2005, Rand Afrikaans University, Technikon Witwatersrand and the Soweto and East Rand campuses of the Vista University ceased to exist as such, when they merged to become the University of Johannesburg, as part of a broader reorganisation of South African universities. The outgoing and final vice chancellor of the university was Roux Botha.
