= H. B. Thom =

Afrikaner professor and former Rector of the Stellenbosch University

Hendrik Bernardus Thom

Rector of the Stellenbosch University
- In office 1954–1969
- Preceded by: Wilcocks, R.W.
- Succeeded by: de Villiers, J.N.

Chairman of the Afrikaner Broederbond
- In office 1952–1960
- Preceded by: van Rooy, J.C.
- Succeeded by: Meyer, P.J.

Chancellor of the Stellenbosch University
- In office 1983–1983
- Preceded by: Vorster, B.J.
- Succeeded by: Botha, P.W.

Personal details
- Born: 13 December 1905 Jamestown, Cape Province, South Africa
- Died: 4 November 1983 (aged 77) Stellenbosch
- Spouse: Maria du Toit
- Children: none
- Education: Stellenbosch University, Friedrich Wilhelms Universität, Sorbonne

Hendrik Bernardus Thom (13 December 1905 – 4 November 1983) was an Afrikaner professor and former Rector of the Stellenbosch University.

== Life and career ==
Thom was born in Jamestown, Cape Colony, and grew up in Burgersdorp, South Africa. Because he was the 5th grandchild of his grandfather and namesake with the first names Hendrik Bernardus, his parents decided to call him by the nickname Quintus ("Five") to distinguish him from his cousins; he was known as Quintie Thom throughout his life. He matriculated at Burgersdorp High School and studied at Stellenbosch University (BA History and Dutch, cum laude, 1926 and MA History, cum laude, 1928). He continued his studies in history in Germany at the Friedrich Wilhelms Universität in Berlin (1928–1929), at the Sorbonne in Paris (1930) and in Amsterdam, researching his doctoral thesis, which he completed on his return to Stellenbosch. The title of his doctoral thesis (PhD, 1930) was: Die geskiedenis van die skaapboerdery in Suid-Afrika (The history of sheep farming in South Africa).

During the next year he was appointed as lecturer of history at the Stellenbosch University, and promoted to senior lecturer in 1935. In 1937 he was appointed as professor of history at the same institution. From 1954 H.B. Thom was Rector of the Stellenbosch University until his retirement in 1969. In 1983 he was voted Chancellor, but he died at the end of the same year having served as Chancellor of the university for only nine months. The HB Thom theatre at the university was named in his honour. In 2018, this theatre was renamed to the Adam Small Theatre Complex in the spirit of recognition, redress and reconciliation.

H.B. Thom enjoyed tennis, fishing and photography and married Maria du Toit in 1934; the marriage was childless.

He played a major role in the cultural life of the Afrikaner people, and wrote a number of important historical books.

He served on the Archives Commission (Argiefkommissie) and acted as chairman from 1950 to 1955. He was a member of the Historical Monuments Commission (Historiese Monumentekommissie, later Raad vir Nasionale Gedenkwaardighede), 1948–1954; Van Riebeeck-Vereniging; Simon van der Stel Foundation; Stellenbosch Museum and chairman of its Board of Trustees, 1962–1968.

He received honorary memberships of the following organisations:

- Nederlandse Koninklijke Akademie voor Wetenschappen 1952
- Maatschappij der Nederlandse Letterkunde te Leiden
- Linschoten Vereniging
- The Hakluyt Society
- Suid-Afrikaanse Akademie vir Wetenskap en Kuns 1981
- Suid-Afrikaanse Historiese Vereniging

For 18 years he was chairman of the FAK (Federasie van Afrikaanse Kultuurvereniginge) and he was a sought after speaker. The FAK was a front for the secret organisation the Afrikaner Broederbond of which Thom was a member and a chairperson from 1952 to 1960 (Wilkins & Strydom, 1978: A28; Google)

He served as Administrator of the Woordeboek van die Afrikaanse Taal (WAT).

== Awards and honours ==
SA Academy for Arts and Science Award for History 1952
Honorary medal extraordinaire for the promotion of Afrikaans literature and culture 1959
Honorary medal extraordinaire for services rendered on behalf of university education 1969
D.F. Malan Medal 1975
Academy for Arts and Science Award ( vir volksdiens) 1980
Doctor honoris causa of Stellenbosch and Orange Free State universities

== Books written ==
- Die Boodskap van 'n Honderd Jaar (Feesrede), 1947
- Die Lewe van Gerrit Maritz, 1947 (Second edition 1965)
- Die Geloftekerk en ander Studies oor die Groot Trek, 1949
- Jannie Marais, 1950
- Daghregister van Jan Antonisz van Riebeeck, 1952 (translated by HB and Maria Thom)
- Die Nuwe Beeld van ons Weermag, (editor), 1963
- Die Uitdaging van die Toekoms, (editor), 1965
- Stellenbosch, 1866–1966 (co-author), 1966
- D.F. Malan, 1980 (incomplete)

Contributed to: Geskiedenis van Suid-Afrika (editors: Van der Walt, Wiid en Geyer), Suid-Afrikaanse Bibliografiese Woordeboek and Argief-jaarboek.
Member of the editorial staff of Nederlandse tydskrif Bijdragen voor de Geschiedenis der Nederlanden.
