= Pieter de Lange =

Chairman of the Afrikaner Broederbond
- In office 1984–1994
- Preceded by: Boshoff, C.W.H.
- Succeeded by: de Beer, T.L.

Rector of the Randse Afrikaanse Universiteit
- In office 1979–1987
- Preceded by: Viljoen, G.vN.
- Succeeded by: Crouse, C.F.

Personal details
- Born: Jan Pieter de Lange; 27 February 1926 Fort Beaufort, Cape Province, South Africa
- Died: 9 April 2019 (aged 93) Pretoria, South Africa
- Spouse: Christine
- Education: University of Pretoria, Randse Afrikaanse Universiteit and University of South Africa
- Known for: Education and negotiator

Jan Pieter de Lange (27 February 1926 – 9 April 2019) was a South African educationalist, chairman of the Afrikaner Broederbond, and a negotiator.

== Roots and education ==
De Lange was born to Lucas and Helena de Lange (nee Kruger) in Fort Beaufort.. He attended Aberdeen High School in Aberdeen and Gill College in Somerset East. In 1953 he married Christine Marais.

He obtained bachelor's degrees in law and education from the University of Pretoria, and a master's degree and a doctorate in education from the Randse Afrikaanse Universiteit.

== A career in education ==
He served as vice-rector at Goudstad College of Education (1967-1968) and rector of the Potchefstroom College of Education (1969). In 1979 he became rector of the Randse Afrikaanse Universiteit, a position he held until 1987. After his academic career, he became chairman of the HSRC Board from 1988 to 1995.

In August 1980, the government requested the HSRC to conduct an investigation into all levels of education. The main conclusion from the 1981 De Lange report was that all education should be equal, irrespective of race, and a single ministry should handle it.

== Involvement in the Afrikaner Broederbond ==
He served as Chairman of the Afrikaner Broederbond from 1984 -1994. By 1985 the Broederbond was in agreement that the Apartheid system in South Africa was no longer sustainable. De Lange issued a discussion document to all members in which he stated that a negotiated settlement with a full democracy was the only solution.

On 8 June 1986, De Lange met with the banned African National Congress' Thabo Mbeki in New York, which opened the door for future interactions including the Dakar Conference. As leader of the Broederbond, he played a role in the negotiated settlement reached in South Africa in 1994.

He passed away in Pretoria on 9 April 2019.

== Publication ==
The De Lange report into the education system in South Africa was published in 1981.
