= Gerrit Viljoen =

South African politician (1926–2009)

Rector of the Randse Afrikaanse Universiteit
- In office 1967–1979
- Preceded by: Office established
- Succeeded by: de Lange, J.P.

Administrator-General of South West Africa
- In office 1979–1980
- Preceded by: Marthinus T. Steyn
- Succeeded by: Danie Hough

Minister of Education
- In office 1980–1989
- Preceded by: Ferdie Hartzenberg
- Succeeded by: Gene Louw

Minister of Constitutional Development
- In office 1989–1992
- Preceded by: J. C. Heunis
- Succeeded by: Roelf Meyer

Chairman of the Afrikaner Broederbond
- In office 1974–1980
- Preceded by: Andries Treurnicht
- Succeeded by: Carel Boshoff

Personal details
- Born: Gerrit van Niekerk Viljoen; 11 September 1926 Cape Town, South Africa
- Died: 29 March 2009 (aged 82) Stilbaai, South Africa
- Party: National Party
- Spouse: Maria Magdalena van der Merwe
- Children: 7
- Education: Afrikaanse Hoër Seunskool
- Alma mater: University of Pretoria, University of Cambridge, Leiden University
- Known for: Education

Gerrit Van Niekerk Viljoen (11 September 1926 – 29 March 2009) was a South African government minister and member of the National Party.

He was chair of the Broederbond from 1974 to 1980, Administrator-General of South West Africa from 1979 to 1980, Minister of Education in South Africa from 1980 to 1989, and Minister of Constitutional Development from 1989 to 1992.

== Early life ==
He was born in Cape Town in 1926, the son of Helena and Hendrik Geldenhuys Viljoen, the editor of Huisgenoot magazine. He attended Afrikaanse Hoër Seunskool (Afrikaans High School for Boys, also known as Affies), a popular and renowned public school located in Pretoria. He continued his studies at the University of Pretoria. Here he was elected to the Student Representative Council and in 1948 was a founder of the Union of Afrikaans students.

He studied classical literature and philosophy at the University of Cambridge, then at the University of Leiden, where he passed his PhD summa cum laude. On returning to South Africa, he worked at the University of Pretoria and in 1967 was named vice-chancellor of the Rand Afrikaans University.

== Political career ==
In 1974, he succeeded Andries Treurnicht as chair of the Broederbond, an influential organisation of Afrikaners, of which almost all South African government ministers of the time were members.

In 1979, he was appointed Administrator-General of South West Africa, and in 1980 joined the government of P. W. Botha as Minister of Education.

In the 1989 South African general election, he was elected to the House of Assembly of South Africa in Vanderbijlpark constituency. In 1989, he became Minister of Constitutional Development in the government of F. W. de Klerk. As a senior ideologue and spokesman of the National Party, he investigated several constitutional models for a "new South Africa", and took part in the first official negotiations with the African National Congress in May 1990 after the release of political prisoners including Nelson Mandela. During the CODESA negotiations he championed the idea of "group rights", differentiating them from "individual rights", and saw them as a way to entrench the rights of South African groups, including the white minority. He retired from politics and government in 1992 for reasons of health.

Gerrit Viljoen was the father of seven children.
