= Jozua Naudé (pastor) =

South African pastor

Personal details
- Born: Jozua Francois Naudé; 20 March 1873 Middelburg, Cape Province, South Africa
- Died: 28 August 1948 (aged 75) Johannesburg, Transvaal, South Africa
- Spouse: Adriana Johanna Zondagh van Huyssteen
- Children: 8
- Education: Stellenbosch University
- Known for: South African pastor, school founder and Afrikaner Broederbond

Jozua Francois Naudé (20 March 1873 – 28 August 1948) was a South African pastor, school founder and co-founder of the Afrikaner Broederbond.

== Roots ==
Naudé was born on 20 March 1873 in Middelburg Cape Province South Africa. His parents were Jozua Francois Naudé and Louisa van den Berg. He married Adriana Johanna Zondagh van Huyssteen. They had 8 children. He died on 28 August 1948 in Johannesburg, Transvaal, South Africa.

== Education ==
Naudé studied education at Stellenbosch University. After the Anglo Boer War he completed his studies in Theology at Stellenbosch University.

== Career ==
He was a pastor at Aliwal North, Roodepoort, Piet Retief and Graaf-Reinet. While pastor he was member of the Council of Churches. He was involved in the Transvaal Synod. He was Secretary of the Transvaal Synod.

== Specific events ==
He was responsible for the founding of the high school called Graaff-Reinet Volkskool. He was the founder of the first Afrikaans primary school in Transvaal on 23 July 1918. The school was called Roodepoort-Noord Skool. On 22 September 1956 the name was changed to Jozua Naudé Primary school.

== Afrikaner Broederbond ==
On 5 June 1918, Naudé and three others namely: Henning Johannes Klopper, Daniel Hendrik Celliers du Plessis, (born 12 Mar 1898) and Hendrik Willem van der Merwe, (born 1891) founded an organization named the Afrikaner Broederbond. (translated it means "Afrikaner Brotherhood") These men were concerned about the poverty of white Afrikaners.

== Children ==
- Hymne Naudé – South African author of novels. She married P. D. F. Weiss.
- Beyers Naudé – While in the Anglo Boer War, Naudé met C. F. Beyers with whom he established a friendship. Later he named his son after him. While originally also a member of the Afrikaner Broederbond, Beyers Naudé later left the organization and became an anti-apartheid activist.
