= Ferdi Hartzenberg =

South African politician (1936–2021)

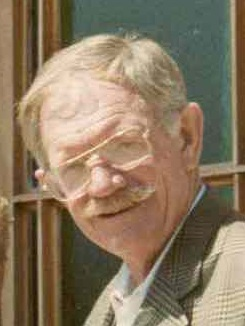

Leader of the Opposition
- In office 1993–1994
- President: F. W. de Klerk
- Preceded by: Andries Treurnicht
- Succeeded by: Constand Viljoen

Minister of Education and Training
- In office 1979–1982
- President: P. W. Botha
- Preceded by: Johannes Petrus van der Spuy
- Succeeded by: Gerrit Viljoen

Deputy Minister of Development
- In office 1978–1979
- President: P. W. Botha

Personal details
- Born: 8 January 1936 Lichtenburg, South Africa
- Died: 12 March 2021 (aged 85) Lichtenburg, South Africa
- Party: Freedom Front Plus (2003–2021)
- Other political affiliations: National Party (1959–1982); Conservative Party (1982–2003)
- Education: University of Pretoria

Ferdinand Hartzenberg (8 January 1936 – 12 March 2021) was a South African politician and the second and last leader of the Conservative Party in South Africa between 1993 and its merger with the Freedom Front in 2004. He obtained a DSc (Agriculture) from the University of Pretoria.

Originally a maize farmer from Lichtenburg in the former Transvaal, Hartzenberg was Minister of Education from 1979 to 1982 in the government of PW Botha. He was then one of the more conservative members of the ruling National Party (NP). Together with Andries Treurnicht and other NP members dissatisfied with increasing liberalism in the ruling NP, he left the NP in 1982 to found the right-wing Conservative Party (CP). Hartzenberg became deputy leader.

Hartzenberg became leader of the CP after Treurnicht's death in April 1993. This made him leader of the official opposition in the white chamber of the South African Parliament, a position he held until the first non-racial elections in April 1994.

The Conservative Party refused to take part in the general election of 1994 and thus lost any parliamentary representation. Without any national representation, the CP became marginalised, with the white right wing represented in parliament by Constand Viljoen of the Freedom Front. At the end of 2003, the CP merged with the larger Freedom Front and the Afrikaner Eenheidsbeweging to form a new party known as the Freedom Front Plus (FF+) which obtained 4 seats in the general election of 2004. Hartzenberg retired from politics following the merger.

Political offices
Preceded by	Minister of Education; 1979–1982	Succeeded by Gerrit Viljoen
