= Andries Treurnicht =

South African politician (1921–1993)

Andries Treurnicht MP
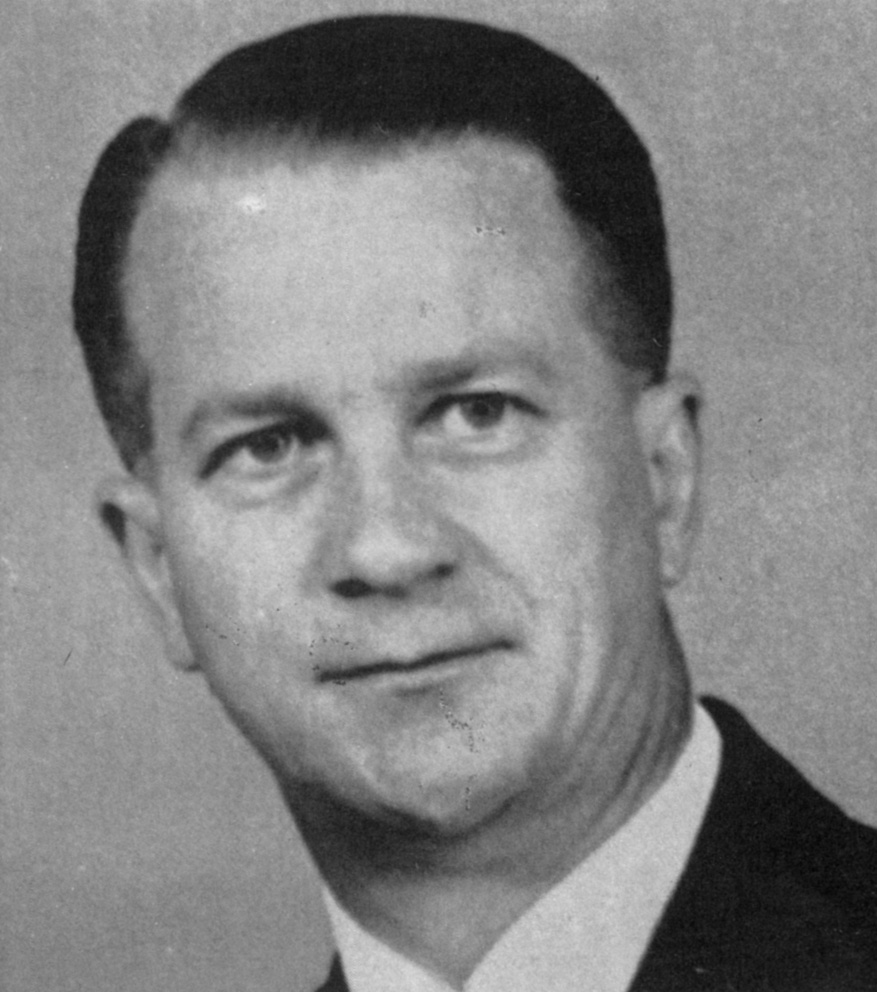
- Treurnicht in 1950

Leader of the Conservative Party
- In office 1982–1993
- Preceded by: Position established
- Succeeded by: Ferdi Hartzenberg

Leader of the Opposition
- In office 1987–1993
- Preceded by: Colin Eglin
- Succeeded by: Ferdi Hartzenberg

Minister of Public Works, Statistics and Tourism
- In office 1979–1980

Leader of National Party in Transvaal
- In office 1978–1982

Deputy Minister of Plural Relations and Development
- In office 1978–1979

Deputy Minister of Education and Training
- In office 1978–1979

South African Member of Parliament
- In office 1971–1993
- Constituency: Waterberg

Chairman of the Afrikaner Broederbond
- In office 1972–1974
- Preceded by: Meyer, P.J.
- Succeeded by: Viljoen. G.

Personal details
- Born: 19 February 1921 Piketberg, Cape Province, South Africa
- Died: 22 April 1993 (aged 72) Cape Town, Cape Province, South Africa
- Party: Conservative
- Other political affiliations: National (1971–1982)
- Spouse: Engela Deyer
- Children: 4 daughters

Andries Petrus Treurnicht (19 February 1921 – 22 April 1993) was a South African politician, Minister of Education during the Soweto Riots and for a short time leader of the National Party in Transvaal. In 1982 he founded and led the Conservative Party of South Africa whose successes among the white electorate made him Leader of the Opposition in 1987, a position he retained until his death. In South Africa's English-language press he was known as "Dr. No" for his unwavering stance on reforming the racial code of apartheid.

== Early life ==
Treurnicht was born in Piketberg, Cape Province, and began his working life as a journalist, being editor of Die Kerkbode and Hoofstad. He was a keen sportsman, excelling on the rugby field, playing provincial rugby against the All Blacks in 1949. After obtaining his MA in Theology at the University of Stellenbosch, he completed a Doctorate in Political Philosophy at the University of Cape Town. He subsequently entered the Dutch Reformed Church (NG Kerk), serving various congregations as minister for fourteen years. He was elected Deputy Chairman of the Cape Synod and later of the General Synod. He combined Afrikaner nationalism with neo-Calvinism and strongly supported the continuation of apartheid.

== Parliamentary career ==
=== National Party 1970-1982 ===
Entering politics in 1970, as a member of the National Party, in 1971 Treurnicht was elected to the House of Assembly as MP for Waterberg. Appointed as Deputy Minister of Education in 1976, his instruction to implement the policy that black students should be taught half in English, half in Afrikaans triggered the Soweto Riots. In 1978, he was chosen, over the heads of 12 ministers, as Leader of the National Party in the Transvaal, and, in 1979, he became Minister of State for Administration and of Statistics. Leading up to the 1981 South African general election, he vowed to maintain the Group Areas Act and claimed that he and his challenger Jaap Marais shared the same policy ideas.

In February 1982 he fought an unsuccessful challenge against Prime Minister P.W. Botha. Treurnicht was supported by former Prime Minister John Vorster, however, Botha was able to secure 172 votes versus 36 on a motion of support in his leadership and his route of power-sharing with other racial groups. As a result, Treurnicht lost his membership in the NP's executive committee. Botha gave Treurnicht and the other dissenters a two-day deadline to reverse their position on the confidence motion, or face expulsion from the party. Treurnicht subsequently decided to resign from the party and his positions.

Treurnicht was chairman of the Afrikaner Broederbond (AB) from 1972 to 1974. He had to leave the AB in 1983, as the newly formed Conservative Party members were not welcome in it.

=== Conservative Party 1982-1993 ===
On 20 March 1982, he and 22 other MPs quit the National Party to form the Conservative Party to oppose P.W. Botha and the National Party's limited reforms to apartheid. The CP's English language programme booklets from 1987 to 1989 stated that the party was established "to continue the policy of self-determination after the [NP] government had exchanged self-determination" (something the CP described as an "infallible policy"), for power-sharing.

In 1987, the Conservative Party became the official opposition in the House of Assembly, winning 550,000 votes, displacing the liberal Progressive Federal Party. Donald Simpson, writing in the South African newspaper, The Star, went as far as to predict that the National Party would lose the next election and that the Conservative Party would become the new government of South Africa.

In June 1989, accompanied by Clive Derby-Lewis, Carl Werth, and several other Conservative Party officials, Treurnicht made an official visit to London and some other European capitals. The far-right Western Goals Institute organized his London visit, and the Conservative Monday Club held a dinner in his honour, at which at least one British Conservative Party MP, Tim Janman, was present.

Already nicknamed "Doctor No", in 1992, he led the opposition campaign during the referendum called by F. W. de Klerk to gain white approval for negotiations to end apartheid. This campaign marked the peak of Conservative support in South Africa, gaining just under one million votes, but the "No" vote was defeated 2 to 1 by white voters.

Treurnicht was the author of no fewer than sixteen books, many in the cultural field.

He died on 22 April 1993, in Cape Town, during a heart operation. His death came shortly after the Conservative Party suffered a major blow with the arrest of senior member Clive Derby-Lewis for his role in the assassination of Chris Hani. His former deputy minister, Ferdinand Hartzenberg, became the last leader of the Conservative Party.

== Personal life ==
Treurnicht married Engela Dreyer on 18 January 1949, and they had four daughters.
