= Gencor =

South African mining company

Gencor Ltd. was a South African based mining company. It was formed in 1980 after the merger of the General Mining and Finance Corporation and the Union Corporation. Parts of the company are now owned by Gold Fields, South32 and BHP.

== History ==
Gencor has its origins as the General Mining and Finance Corporation (GMFC) formed in Johannesburg in December 1895. It would control the Witwatersrand mining business of George and Leopold Albu. It controlled mines such as Meyer and Charlton, Van Ryn Gold Mines Estate, New Steyn Estate Gold Mine and West Rand Consolidated Mines. After Sir George Werner Albu's death in 1963, a majority interest was purchased by Federale Mynbou Beperk (FEDMYN). This purchase created the first Afrikaner owned mining corporation.

In 1968, General Mining launched in a venture, Trek Investments, a South African petrol marketing company.

In 1974, General Mining acquired a stake of 29.9% in the Union Corporation after a take-over attempt of the latter by Goldfields of South Africa. Anglo American assisted General Mining in it purchase to forestall Gold Fields of South Africa expansion of its gold mining holdings. By 1976, the Union Corporation was a subsidiary of General Mining. In 1980, the merger of the two took place with the merged business called General Mining and Union Corporation and eventually renamed as Gencor in 1989.

Engen was formed by Gencor in July 1989 when it purchased Mobil's South African's interests for $150 million when the latter divested from the country. The assets included a refinery in Durban and 1,150 petrol stations. The new company would also manage Trek, 20% of Soekor and Mossgas.

In May 1993, it was announced that Gencor had approached Royal Dutch Shell to purchase the latter's metals and mining business with alumina refining in Brazil, Australia and Suriname and smelting in Brazil. Other assets included gold, nickel and zinc mines in six countries and exploration rights and copper reserves. The wholesale assets included a global metal marketing and trading business. The price for the assets was said to be around $1 billion. There was also talk of Gencor unbundling its non-mining assets.

In July 1994, Gencor acquired the mining division of Billiton excluding the downstream metal division. The purchase was agreed at $1.219 billion with a possible adjustment down to $1.144 billion after the businesses working capital was examined at the end of June. Some of Gencor's existing assets would be held with Billiton's assets and the international group would be called Billiton International with an overseas share listing in Amsterdam or London. Shell funded the acquisition too with $300 convertible bonds issued by Billiton International with no interest paid until 1997, while Gencor paid $335 million in cash, with Swiss banks loaning $430 million plus another $170 million in cash.

In June 1995, Lonrho announced it would be merging a 73% stake their platinum business with Impala Platinum which Gencor held a 46.5% stake with the new business to be called New Platinum, giving the company control of 38% of the worlds platinum production. Lonrho shareholders agreed to the deal in December while Tiny Rowland, a shareholder, objected. By April 1996, the European Commissioner for Competition blocked the deal fearing that the price of platinum would be fixed, if the merger went ahead and by August the same year, Lonrho ended its plan to merge.

Billiton would be demerged from Gencor in 1997, with the former taking Gencor's non-precious metals business consisting of aluminium, ferro-alloys and base metals. Gencor would keep the gold and platinum mining business. The mining assets transfer would be paid for by the exchange of shares to Gencor shareholders. Gencor would also transfer to Billiton, its 55% interest in nickel mining company formed after the merger of the Gencor's and QNI's nickel mines.

In October 1997, Gencor merged its gold assets with Gold Fields and the new company was called Goldco becoming the world's largest gold producer. Brian Gilbertson became its first chairman and the transfer was paid for by the exchange of shares in new company. Gencor amalgamated with Gold Fields of South Africa to become Gold Fields Limited in 1998. In 2001, Billiton would merge with BHP to become BHP Billiton and later just BHP.
