= Leader of the Opposition (South Africa) =

Politician who leads the official opposition in South Africa

Leader of the Opposition of the Republic of South Africa
- 10 other official names: Leier van die Opposisie (Afrikaans); umRholi weHlangano ePhikisako (Southern Ndebele); INkokeli yeQela eliPhikisayo (Xhosa); UMholi weQembu Eliphikisayo (Zulu); Umholi Welicembu Leliphikisako (Swazi); Moetapele wa Lekgotlakgolo la Kganetšo (Northern Sotho); Moetapele wa Mokga wa Kganyetso (Sotho); Moeteledi wa Kganetso (Tswana); Murhangeri wa Vukaneti (Tsonga); Murangaphanḓa wa Ḽihoro Ḽihanedzi (Venda)
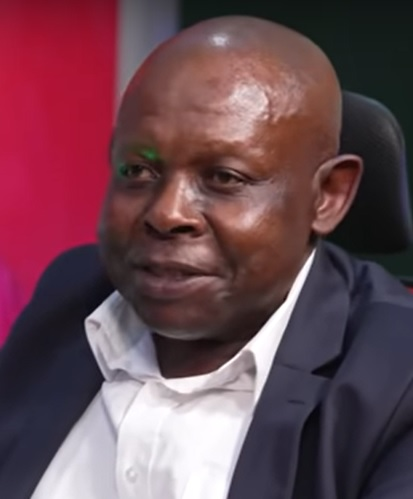
- Incumbent; John Hlophe since 25 June 2024; 2 years ago
- Style: The Honourable
- Type: Head of the parliamentary opposition
- Member of: The National Assembly
- Seat: Office of the Leader of the Official Opposition, Parliament of South Africa
- Term length: Indefinite; Insofar as the leader's party is the largest party in the National Assembly that is not in government
- Constituting instrument: Constitution of South Africa
- Inaugural holder: Leander Starr Jameson
- Formation: 15 September 1910; 115 years ago
- Salary: R 792,595 annually (2024)

The leader of the opposition in South Africa is the leader of the largest political party in the National Assembly that is not in government. The House of Assembly was the most important House from 1910 to 1994 and the National Assembly from 1994. The leader of the opposition acts as the public face of the opposition, leading the Official Opposition Shadow Cabinet and the challenge to the government on the floor of Parliament. They thus act as a chief critic of the government and ultimately attempt to portray the opposition as a feasible alternate government.

The position of opposition leader in the National Assembly is currently held by John Hlophe of the uMkhonto weSizwe (MK), who was appointed on 25 June 2024.

In the list below, when the office is said to be vacant, there was no opposition party with more than ten seats and no clear leader of the opposition has been identified. This was the case between the formation of the Hertzog–Smuts coalition in 1933 and the breakaway of the Purified National Party (GNP) in 1934. It was also the case during the Government of National Unity between 1994 and 1996, when the National Party (NP) withdrew.

In the case of the Democratic Alliance (DA), the leader of the opposition may have been the Parliamentary leader only, during a vacancy in the party leadership and the first part of their own tenure, before being confirmed as party leader by a party congress. Athol Trollip and Lindiwe Mazibuko (and Mmusi Maimane for a short period) have been Parliamentary leaders only, whilst the incumbent Federal Leader of the Democratic Alliance, Helen Zille, was not a member of Parliament.

Following the national election in May 2024, the African National Congress (ANC) lost its outright majority for the first time in South Africa’s democratic history. The DA entered the government, the ANC-led Government of National Unity, for the first time. The new MK party, the third biggest political party in the parliament after the ANC and the DA, became the official opposition.

== Legal definition ==
Section 56 of the South Africa Act 1909, was amended by Section 1 (b) of the South Africa Act Amendment Act 1946. A salary was provided for the leader of the opposition and the office was given an official definition.

"For the purposes of this section the expression 'Leader of the Opposition' shall mean that member of the House of Assembly who is for the time being the Leader in that House of the party in opposition to the Government having the greatest numerical strength in that House and if there is any doubt as to which is or was at any material time the party in opposition to the Government having the greatest numerical strength in that House of Assembly, or as to who is or was at any material time the Leader in the House of such a party, the question shall be decided for the purposes of this section by the Speaker of the House of Assembly, and his decision, certified in writing under his hand, shall be final and conclusive".

The current Constitution of South Africa makes provision for recognition of the leader of the opposition in Section 57(2):

"The rules and orders of the National Assembly must provide for … the recognition of the leader of the largest opposition party in the Assembly as the Leader of the Opposition."

Rule 21 of the rules of the National Assembly provides in similar words that:

"The leader of the largest opposition party in the Assembly must be recognised as the Leader of the Opposition."

== List of leaders of the opposition in South Africa (1910–present) ==
| No. | Portrait | Leader (Birth–Death) | Political party | Term of office |
|---|---|---|---|---|
| 1 | | Leander Starr Jameson (1853–1917) | Unionist Party | 1910–1912 |
| 2 | | Thomas Smartt (1858–1929) | Unionist Party | 1912–1920 |
| 3 | | J. B. M. Hertzog (1866–1942) | National Party | 1920–1924 |
| 4 | | Jan Smuts (1870–1950) | South African Party | 1924–1933 |
| vacant (Note: During this interval, Walter Madeley of the Labour Party served as de facto leader of the opposition, being leader of the largest party outside government coalition.) | | | | 1933–1934 |
| | | Walter Madeley (1873–1947) | Labour Party | 1933–1934 |
| 5 | | D. F. Malan (1874–1959) | Purified National Party | 1934–1940 |
| (3) | | J. B. M. Hertzog (1866–1942) | Reunited National Party | 1940 |
| (5) | | D. F. Malan (1874–1959) | Reunited National Party | 1940–1948 |
| (4) | | Jan Smuts (1870–1950) | United Party | 1948–1950 |
| 6 | | J. G. N. Strauss (1900–1990) | United Party | 1950–1956 |
| 7 | | Sir De Villiers Graaff (1913–1999) | United Party | 1956–1977 |
| 8 | | Radclyffe Cadman (1924–2011) | New Republic Party | 1977 |
| 9 | | Colin Eglin (1925–2013) | Progressive Federal Party | 1977–1979 |
| 10 | | Frederik van Zyl Slabbert (1940–2010) | Progressive Federal Party | 1979–1986 |
| (9) | | Colin Eglin (1925–2013) | Progressive Federal Party | 1986–1987 |
| 11 | | Andries Treurnicht (1921–1993) | Conservative Party | 1987–1993 |
| 12 | | Ferdi Hartzenberg (1936–2021) | Conservative Party | 1993–1994 |
| vacant (Note: During this interval, Constand Viljoen of the Freedom Front Plus served as de facto leader of the opposition, being leader of the largest party outside government coalition.) | | | | 1994–1996 |
| | | Constand Viljoen (1933–2020) | Freedom Front Plus | 1994–1996 |
| 13 | | F. W. de Klerk (1936–2021) | National Party | 1996–1997 |
| 14 | | Marthinus van Schalkwyk (born 1959) | New National Party | 1997–1999 |
| 15 | | Tony Leon (born 1956) | Democratic Party (until 2000) | 1999–2007 |
| | | Tony Leon (born 1956) | Democratic Alliance (from 2000) | 1999–2007 |
| 16 | | Sandra Botha (born 1945) | Democratic Alliance | 2007–2009 |
| 17 | | Athol Trollip (born 1964) | Democratic Alliance | 2009–2011 |
| 18 | | Lindiwe Mazibuko (born 1980) | Democratic Alliance | 2011–2014 |
| 19 | | Mmusi Maimane (born 1980) | Democratic Alliance | 2014–2019 |
| — | | Annelie Lotriet (born 1960); Acting | Democratic Alliance | 2019 |
| 20 | | John Steenhuisen (born 1976) | Democratic Alliance | 2019–2024 |
| 21 | | John Hlophe (born 1959) | uMkhonto we Sizwe | 2024–present |
