= Afrikanerbond =

Organization in South Africa

- Formation: 1994
- Type: Community organization
- Headquarters: Die Eike
- Location(s): Northcliff, Johannesburg, South Africa
- Members: est. 12,000
- Official language: Afrikaans
- Chairman: Wiese, A.T
- Key people: Bosman, J.P.G. Chief Secretary
- Website: http://www.afrikanerbond.co.za

The Afrikanerbond (Afrikaner League), established in 1994, is the successor to the Afrikaner Broederbond, formerly a South African secret society. Unlike its predecessor, membership is open to anyone over the age of 18 years who identifies with the Afrikaner community. Applicants are required to go through a selection process before membership is granted. The existence of the organisation is no longer cloaked in secrecy; it now has its own website.

The Afrikanerbond acts in the interest of Afrikaners who are committed to South Africa and want to positively contribute to the creation of a successful South Africa, which provides opportunities for all South Africans. The Afrikanerbond is therefore involved in:

- the protection and promotion of fundamental rights,
- protection of constitutional democracy
- the promotion of responsible citizenship and patriotism.

The chairmen of the Afrikanerbond were:

Name	From	To
de Beer, T.L.	1994	2000
Venter, F.	2000	2004
van Garderen, D.S..	2004	2007
Theron, P.F.	2007	2010
Vorster, P.J,	2010	2014
Schoeman, J.G.	2014	2020
Wiese, A.T.	2020	

== See also ==
- Afrikaner Nationalism
- Afrikaner Calvinism
- Secret society
