= Federale Mynbou =

South African mining holding company

- Trade name: FedMyn
- Native name: Federale Mynbou Beperk
- Type: Public
- Industry: Mining holding company
- Founded: 1953
- Headquarters: South Africa

Federale Mynbou (FedMyn) was a South African mining holding company created in 1953 as a means for Afrikaner business capital to obtain some control of the country's mining industry, dominated at the time by English South African mining companies. Initially a mining company, it became a holding company of the General Mining and Finance Corporation and the Union Corporation that eventually became Gencor. Federale Mynbou itself was partially own at that time by Sanlam and the Rembrandt Group.

== Background ==
Federale Volksbeleggings (FVB) and Bonus Investment Corporation (Bonuskor) formed Federale Mynbou (FedMyn) on the 6 June 1953 with R120,000 in capital with the two financers owning equal shares in the new company. William Coetzer was the first chairman and managing director. Federale Mynbou purchased two small coal mines called Klippoortjie and Koornfontein that were previously owned by FVB. Needing capital to expand, on 1 June 1958, Sanlam joined the existing shareholders FVB and Bonuskor, acquiring an equal third share in Federale Mynbou. On 29 July 1959, Federale Mynbou listed on the Johannesburg Stock Exchange.

Its break into gold mining happened in November 1958 when it joined Anglo American Corporation, General Mining Corporation and the Anglo-Transvaal Consolidated Investment Company in investing in the Zandpan Gold Mining Company outside Klerksdorp. During 1962, Mynbou expanded into asbestos mining acquiring two companies.

Trans-Natal Coal Company Corporation was a share holding company formed in 1963 from the Natal Navigation Collieries, Transvaal Navigation Collieries, Klipoortje and Koornfonetin Collieries and Federale Mynbou's coal interests with the existing shares of the latter exchanged for those in the new company. It would become the second biggest coal mining company in South Africa. The company's coal sector growth was helped by being awarded four of five contracts to supply coal to new Eskom power stations.

Anglo American blocked Mynbou's attempted takeover of Johannesburg Consolidated Investments (JCI) in 1962, which would have given it an interest in diamond, platinum, and copper industries. This block of an attempt by an Afrikaner mining company to break into the English owned mining interests in the country resulted in the government forming a commission of inquiry into Anglo American in 1964. A new jointly own company was formed by Federale Mynbou and Anglo American in 1964 called Main Street Investments. It saw Federale Mybou contribute its shareholding of Trans-Natal Coal Company Corporation that it had formed a year earlier. Anglo American in turn would contribute it a shareholding of the General Mining and Finance Corporation to the new company.

In August 1963, a diamond exploration concession was obtained in South West Africa. It was granted to the consortium of Federale Mynbou, Bonuskor, Federale Volksbellegings, Santam, Sanlam, Spes Bona Mynboumaatskappy and Duinveld Bellegings.

An announcement was made in June 1965 with Anglo American and Federale Mynbou creating a new joint venture, of equal share, in their Main Street Investments (1965) company. The new £5 million company would invest in steel and heavy industry. At the same time, Main Street Investments would be renamed Hollardstraatese Bellegings. Anglo American sold a 1% share in the Main Street to Federale Mynbou giving it a 51% shareholding in the company and making General Mining and Finance Corporation (Genmin) a subsidiary of Mynbou.

By 1975, Mynbou became the second largest mining house in South Africa with the takeover of the Union Corporation by Genmin. Between August 1974 to January 1975, it beat off several competitors offers to take over Union Corporation, one by Barlow Rand in June 1974, then three offers by Gold Fields of South Africa (GFSA) while its own offer in conjunction with Anglo American Corporation was rejected. Anglo offered to assist in a second offer, but only if it obtained Union Corporations platinum interests and shares in Sappi. This assistance was rejected and with a foreign loan of US$85m from Deutsche Länderbank, acquired by privately purchasing foreign owned shares of the Union Corporation through intermediaries, a further 10% of the latter and control with a 51% shareholding. In 1978, Sanlam acquired a controlling interest in Mynbou. In 1980, the merger of the two mining companies took place with the merged business renamed as the General Mining and Union Corporation and then eventually as Gencor in 1989. The Federale Mynbou's name changed to the Gencor Holding Company in 1989.
