= J. H. Conradie =

South African politician, advocate, and judge

Johannes Hendrik Conradie

Speaker of Parliament of South Africa
- In office 1950–1961
- Preceded by: Tom Naudé
- Succeeded by: Henning Klopper

Personal details
- Born: March 13, 1897 Robertson, Cape Colony
- Died: August 12, 1966 (aged 69) Robertson, Cape Province, South Africa
- Education: University of Cape Town, University of Cambridge and Trinity College
- Known for: Politician, Advocate, Judge and Speaker of Parliament of South Africa.

Johannes Hendrik Conradie (13 March 1897 – 12 August 1966) was a South African politician, advocate, and judge who was a Speaker of Parliament of South Africa.

== Studies ==
He studied at the University of Cape Town, Trinity College, Cambridge. He graduated with a Master of Arts at UCT and a Bachelor of Arts and a Bachelor of Laws at Cambridge.

== Career ==
Conradie was a Queen's Counsel and started his career as an advocate in Cape Town, South Africa. He became a member of parliament for Gordonia from 26 May 1938 to 31 December 1960. In 1951 he became Speaker of the House of Assembly and stayed in that position for 10 years from 19 January 1951 to 30 December 1960.

He then became Judge President of the Supreme Court of South Africa's South West Africa Division in Windhoek as from 1 January 1961. David Gideon Conradie, a cousin of J.H. Conradie, succeeded him in death when he died in Pretoria, Gauteng, South Africa on 30 September 1967.

== Personal life ==
Johannes Conradie was born 13 March 1897 as the son of a wine farmer, also named Johannes Hendrik Conradie from Robertson and farmed on the side all his life. His mother was Maria Wilhelmina van Eeden. He never got married, but adopted a son. When he died 12 August 1966 his adoptive son inherited the farm Robertson. He was a keen tennis player and was a club member at Kelvin Grove.
