= Conservative Party (South Africa) =

1982–2004 political party in South Africa

Conservative Party Konserwatiewe Party (Afrikaans)
- Leader: Andries Treurnicht; 1982–1993; Ferdi Hartzenberg; 1993–2004
- Founded: 20 March 1982
- Dissolved: September 2004
- Split from: National Party
- Merged into: Freedom Front
- Headquarters: Cape Town
- Ideology: Social conservatism National conservatism Afrikaner nationalism Apartheid; White supremacy
- Political position: Far-right

The Conservative Party (Afrikaans: Konserwatiewe Party) was a far-right South African political party that sought to preserve many aspects of apartheid in the system's final decade, and formed the official opposition in the white-only House of Assembly in the last seven years of minority rule. It declined quickly after apartheid ended, before being merged with the Freedom Front in 2004.

== Foundation and early support ==
The party was formed on 20 March 1982 by 23 MPs from the ruling National Party who opposed Prime Minister PW Botha's reforms to apartheid and power sharing proposals, that resulted in the Tricameral Parliament, which they saw as a threat to white minority rule, and the racial segregation known as Separate Development. It was led by Andries Treurnicht, a former Dutch Reformed Church minister popularly known as 'Doctor No'. The CP's English-language programme booklets from 1987 to 1989 stated that the party was established "to continue the policy of self-determination after the [NP] government had exchanged self-determination" (something the CP described as an "infallible policy"), for power-sharing. It drew support from white South Africans, mostly Afrikaners in the rural heartlands of South Africa. All members of the new party that belonged to the Afrikaner Broederbond had to leave that organization as they were not welcome anymore.

== Official opposition ==
It became the official opposition in the whites-only House of Assembly of South Africa in the elections of 6 May 1987, when it surpassed the liberal Progressive Federal Party, winning 550,000 votes. Donald Simpson, writing in the South African newspaper, The Star, went as far as to predict that the National Party would lose the next election and that the Conservative Party would become the new government of South Africa.

In the local elections of 1987 the Conservative Party won 60 municipalities out of 110 in the Transvaal, and 1 out of 4 in the Orange Free State. The Conservative Party received 45% of the Afrikaner votes and 7.5% of the English-speaking votes. It won 50% of the Afrikaner vote in the Transvaal and Orange Free State provinces in the 1989 general elections. It won 40% of the White popular vote in the Transvaal, and 45% in the Orange Free State provinces in the 1989 elections.

In the late 1980s, the party established links with the British far-right anti-communist pressure group, the Western Goals Institute.

== Opposition to negotiations to end apartheid ==
In the general election of 1989, the last before non-racial elections, the party strengthened its vote to 31.52% of the white electorate and 41 seats in the House of Assembly.

The Conservative Party led the "no" campaign during the 1992 referendum, when white South Africans were asked to determine whether or not they supported the negotiated reforms started by the government. Apart from Treurnicht, the official Leader of the Opposition, and Clive Derby-Lewis, the Shadow Finance Minister, the no side was supported by former President P W Botha, who denounced de Klerk's reforms as irresponsible and perilous to the stability of the country. The result was a defeat for the "no" side, when 68% of white voters voted "yes".

Clive Derby-Lewis was found guilty in 1993 (under the emergency legislation enacted by the House of Assembly) of involvement in the assassination of South African Communist Party leader Chris Hani. In 1997, party leader Ferdi Hartzenberg testified before the Truth and Reconciliation Commission that the assassination had been carried out on the party's behalf.

== Election results ==
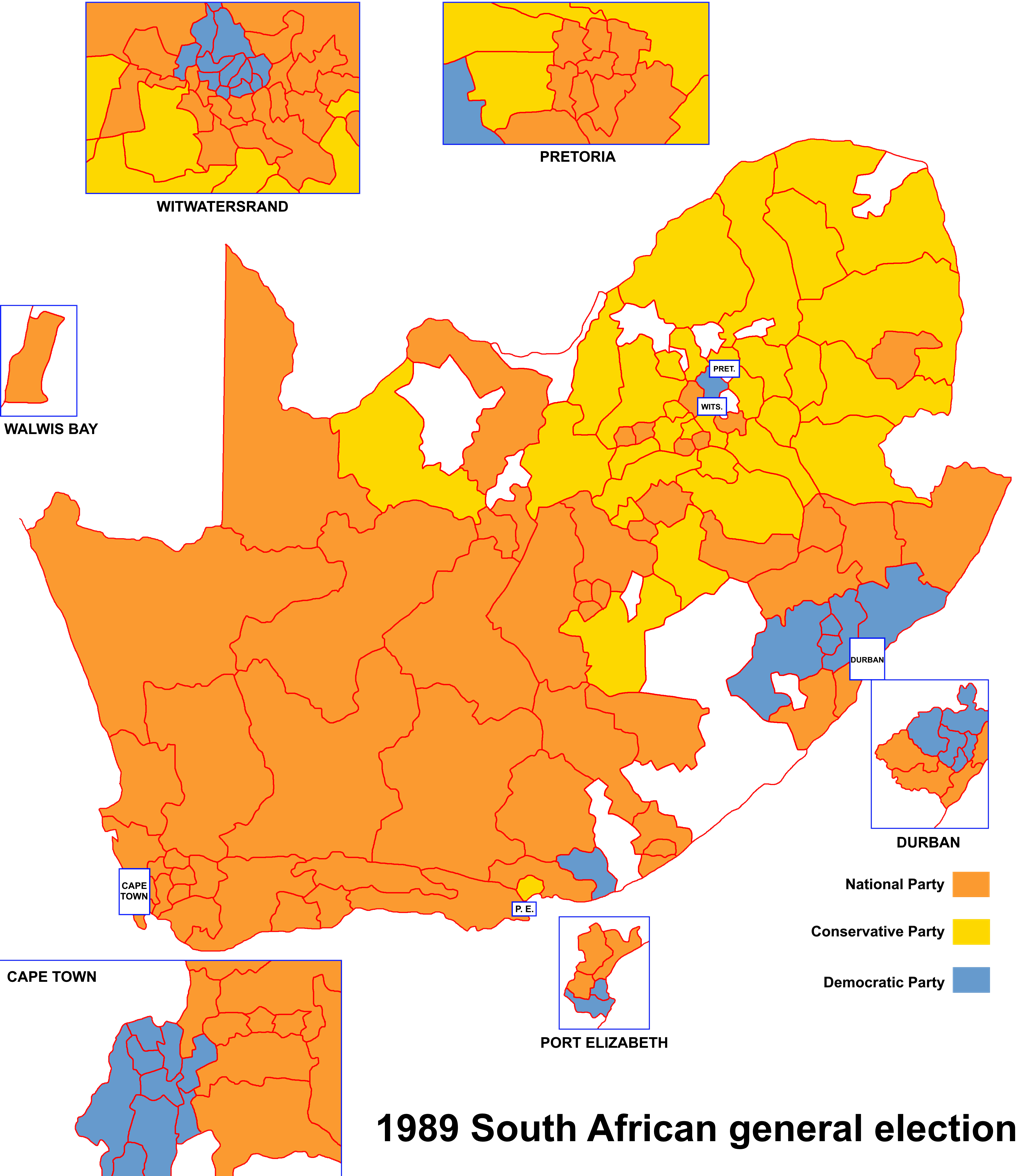
Results by constituency in 1989 election. Conservative Party was in yellow.

House of Assembly
Election year	# of total votes	% of overall vote	# of seats won	Rank
1987	574 502 ▲	26.6% ▲	22 ▲	2/5 ▲
1989	680,131 ▲	31.5% ▲	39 ▲	2/4 ▲

== Post apartheid decline and dissolution ==
Its support rapidly declined after majority rule in 1994. The decision not to participate in the first non-racial parliamentary elections in 1994 resulted in much of its support base defecting to the newly formed Freedom Front, another party of similar views which had been joined by one of its MPs Pieter Mulder. In the 1995–96 South African municipal elections, the CP won 57 seats (out of 11 368) and a mere fraction of the votes compared to the FF and the NP.

In 2002, the Conservative Party became more active again after a largely dormant period. The party gained two seats at local level in the North West province when councillors representing a regional party joined the CP, and in the 2003 floor crossing period a Freedom Front MPL defected to the CP, giving the party one seat in the Gauteng Provincial Legislature. This was followed by several more defections from FF members at regional or branch level. Party leader Hartzenberg explained that the CP had re-considered its stance not to contest elections. However, it soon became apparent that increasing its participation within the modern South African political system meant that it would merge with the larger Freedom Front, now led by Mulder, to form the Freedom Front Plus. Besides Mulder, two other former Conservative Party MPs, Corné Mulder and Pieter Groenewald, also serve as Freedom Front Plus MPs.

The merger was consolidated when its remaining two municipal councillors joined the FF+ during the September 2004 floor crossing period, thus bringing a formal end to the Conservative Party.

=== Legacy ===
A new political party was founded by former members of the Conservative Party on 16 April 2016, with similar beliefs, policies and logo, namely the National Conservative Party of South Africa.

== See also ==
- White backlash
- Rhodesian Action Party similar party in Rhodesia (1977-1979)
