= Potchefstroom Gimnasium =

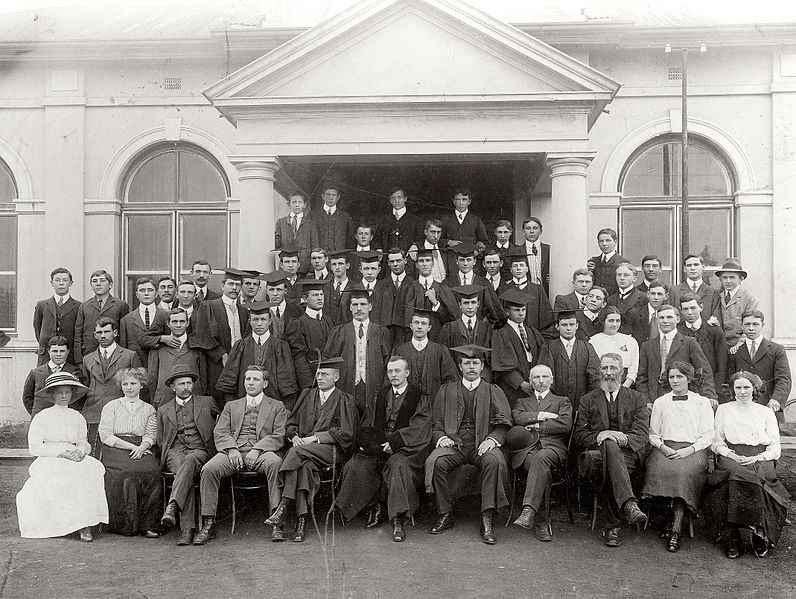
- Pupils and staff of the preparatory school (later Potchefstroom Gimnasium) in front of the school

Location
- Potchefstroom, North West; South Africa; 26°41′11″S 28°05′51″E

Information
- Type: Public & Boarding
- Motto: Fac et Spera (Latin: "Work and hope")
- Religious affiliation: Christianity
- Founded: 1907; 119 years ago
- School district: District 9
- Principal: F.W. Van der Merwe
- Staff: 100 full-time
- Grades: 8–12
- Gender: Boys & Girls
- Age: 13 to 18
- Schedule: 07:30 – 14:00
- Campus: Urban Campus
- Campus type: Suburban
- Colours: Blue; White
- Nickname: Gimmies
- Rival: Hoër Volkskool Potchefstroom
- Accreditation: North West Department of Education
- Newspaper: SASIMA
- Website: www.gimmies.co.za

Potchefstroom Gimnasium, colloquially known as Potch Gim, is a public Afrikaans medium co-educational high School in Potchefstroom, North West, South Africa.

== History ==
The “Voorbereidende Skool” (English: preparatory school) was founded in 1907 as a Dutch language school by the Theological Centre of the Reformed Church of South Africa. The founders committee existed of Kamp, J., Duvenage, A.P.C, Lion Cachet, J., Postma, F. and du Toit, J.D. The school's first hostel was built in 1907, and classes were initially held in the Theological Centre's Library.

On 13 November 1914, the school was renamed the Potchefstroom Gimnasium and became a government school the following year. In 1916 the school began teaching in Afrikaans.

In May 1947, the school was relocated to its own building.

== Present ==
The school has two hostels Brandwag for boys and Cachet for girls.

=== Motto and crest ===
The school's mottos is “Fac et Spera” (Latin: Work and Hope), a quotation from the Statenvertaling. The motto is “Fac et Spera”, which is Latin for “Work and Hope”. The school's crest consists of an anchor, symbolising hope, and a pick and shovel, symbolising work.

=== Performance ===
In 2017 and 2018, the school had the best academic performance in the North West province.

In 2018, the school was the North West provincial winner for athletics.

=== International connection ===
Since 2005 the school has a long-term agreement with Växjö Fria Gimnasium, an upper secondary school in Växjö, Sweden. Each year, eight students are selected who together with students from the Swedish school form a working group focusing on development work in schools in South Africa's townships. They organize different fundraising projects and help in practical construction and repair of Schools.

== Notable former pupils ==
- Tjaart Marais (born 1961)- Rugby Fly-half for Western Transvaal and scored 703 Currie Cup points in his career.
- Henriette Grové (1922–2009)– Writer
- Greta Jones (1965–1992)- Singer
- Theuns Eloff (born 1955) – Ex- vice Chancellor of the Potchefstroom University for Christian Higher Education and executive director of the FW de Klerk Foundation.
- Theo Jansen van Rensburg (born 1967)- springbok rugby player (full-back)
- Jan Brand van Rooyen de Wet (born 1950) –Singer
- Ockert Potgieter (1965–2021) – South African Missionary in Ukraine. and movie director
- TB Truter (born 1997) - Chief editor at "Stywe Lyne" a fishing and tackle magazine

== Notable former teachers ==
- Johannes Christiaan Coetzee – taught at the school from 1917–1920

== Headmasters ==
- J.A.A. Coetsee (1907–1938)
- W.deK. Kruger (1938–1965)
- A.J. Combrink (1965–1974)
- A.B.J. Kruger (1974–1979)
- L.A. Dreyer (1979–1982)
- A.N. Grobler (1982–1985)
- C.A. Janson(1986–1999)
- J. Breed (2000–2008)
- R.A. Oosthuizen (2009–2021).
- F.W. Van der Merwe (2022–2025)
- M. Van der Merwe (2026-present)
