= Tjaart =

Tjaart is a given name. Notable people with the name include:

- Tjaart du Plessis (born 1967), South African wrestler
- Tjaart Marais, South African rugby player
- Tjaart van der Walt (born 1974), South African golfer
- Tjaart van der Walt (academic) (1934–2019), South African academic
