= Ntate Daniel Kgwadi =

South African academic administrator (1967–2023)

Rector of the North-West University Mahikeng Campus
- In office 2004–2014
- Preceded by: Office established
- Succeeded by: Maselesele, M.

Vice-Chancellor of the North-West University
- In office 2014–2021
- Preceded by: Eloff, T.

Personal details
- Born: 1967 Kraaipan, Western Transvaal, South Africa
- Died: 30 April 2023 (aged 55–56)
- Spouse: Mable
- Education: Ball State University, Potchefstroom University for Christian Higher Education, University of the North and University of Bophuthatswana

Ntate Daniel Kgwadi (1967 – 30 April 2023) was a South African academic administrator who served as the vice-chancellor of Vaal University of Technology and as the vice-chancellor and previous rector of the North-West University in South Africa.

== Early life ==
Kgwadi was born in Kraaipan, Western Transvaal, South Africa. He matriculated at Kebalepile High School, Mafikeng. He obtained degrees: a BSc from the University of Bophuthatswana, an MSc in Physics from Ball State University, an MPhil from University of the North in South Africa, and a PhD in Physics Education from Potchefstroom University for Christian Higher Education in South Africa. He married Mable Kgwadi.

== Career ==
Kgwadi taught at Phatsima High School. In 2004, with the start of North-West University, Kgwadi was appointed rector at the Mafikeng campus of the university. He occupied this position until 2014.

=== Vice–chancellor ===
In 2014, the then vice-chancellor Theuns Eloff resigned after a video surfaced showing first year students doing a Hitler salute, although an investigation showed no racial intent. Eloff resigned as a sign of goodwill. Kgwadi was appointed Vice-Chancellor of the university with effect on 1 April 2014. Kgwadi was the first black, non-Afrikaans speaking vice-chancellor. He was based at the head office in Potchefstroom.

When Kgwadi assumed the vice-chancellor's office, Afrikaans was the language spoken by more than 50% of the students. Interpreter programmes (in class) were organized by the university. Students had the option to write exams in English or Afrikaans. Kgwadi's plan was to have no dominant language.

On the 7 November 2021, he submitted a letter of resignation to the North-West University stating that he will be leaving the institution to continue his career in the Vaal University of Technology. Prof. Kgwadi still served as the Vice-Chancellor of North-West University until 31 January 2022, as required by the employment contract.

== Personal life and death ==
In April 2018, Kgwadi had a heart attack, but survived and continued to serve.

Kgwadi died on 30 April 2023.

== Awards ==
A Honoris Causa PhD was awarded to him by the Hanseo University in Seosan, South Korea in 2010.
