= Hoër Volkskool Potchefstroom =

Location
- 41 Kruis St, Potchefstroom, 2531; Potchefstroom, North West; South Africa; 26.7253°S 27.0812°E

Information
- Type: Public High School
- Motto: Sapientia Vis Vera (Latin: Wisdom is true power)
- Established: 1922
- Founder: Mr. J.D. Grundlingh, Mrs. Nellie Chessworth, Mr. P.M. van der Lingen
- Principal: Mr. P.W Van Aswegen
- Grades: 8–12
- Gender: Co-Ed
- Enrollment: 965 (2017)
- Colours: Red , Gold , Black ,
- Mascot: Freddy
- Nickname: Volkies
- Rival: Potchefstroom Gimnasium
- Website: volkiespotch.co.za

Hoër Volkskool Potchefstroom, colloquially known as Potch Volkies, is a public high school located in Potchefstroom, North West, South Africa.

== Early history ==
The emergence of Christian National Education was closely linked with the rise of Afrikaner nationhood and resultant nationalism following the Second Anglo-Boer War (1898/9 to 1902) and a number of "Volkskool" schools were established. These schools were often funded by Afrikaners from own funds and by the protestant Reformist churches, despite the devastation of Boer resources during the Anglo-Boer War. These nascent establishments had to contend with the British government's parsimony and reluctance to allocate funding for Afrikaner education. This was due, in no small measure, to Lord Milner's antipathy to the Boer plight and his policy of anglicisation. Kitchener and Milner were at odds over the treatment of the Boers after the war. Kitchener was more lenient: he wanted to promote reconciliation between the white peoples of South Africa, while Milner wanted to exclude the Boers from future political power. Milner insisted that the Dutch language would no longer be treated on equal terms with English in government, the courts and in education. He wanted completely Anglicized colonies. In 1875, a group of Afrikaans-speakers from the Cape formed the Genootskap vir Regte Afrikaanders ("Society for Real Afrikaners"), and published a number of books in Afrikaans including grammars, dictionaries, religious materials and histories.

Until the early 20th century, Afrikaans was considered a Dutch dialect, alongside Standard Dutch, which it eventually replaced as an official language. Before the Boer wars, "and indeed for some time afterwards, Afrikaans was regarded as inappropriate for educated discourse. Rather, Afrikaans was described derogatorily as 'a kitchen language' or 'a bastard jargon,' suitable for communication mainly between the Boers and their servants." The fledgling Afrikaans language gradually displaced Dutch as the Afrikaner mother tongue and the need for schools offering tuition in the language was a foregone conclusion. Milner's attempt to forcibly anglicise the Boers had failed. The Boers had responded by establishing their own schools. Afrikaans language schools based their pedagogy on Christian National Education. Afrikaans was recognised by the South African government as a distinct language, rather than simply a slang version of Dutch in 1925. Officially, Potchefstroom Volkskool thus predates the recognition of Afrikaans although the school offered Afrikaans medium education from inception. Potchefstroom Gimnasium, however, offered Afrikaans mother tongue instruction from 1915/6

It is in this context that the establishment of Potchefstroom Volkskool, like Heidelberg Volkskool and other Volkskool schools, should be seen. On 19 April 1922 the Afrikaanse Medium Hoërskool opened inside a small church in Potchefstroom. Originally with only 38 standard six (now grade 8) students and three teachers: Mr J.D. Grundlingh and Mrs. Nellie Chessworth, the school's first acting principal was Mr. P.M. van der Lingen. It was on 11 October 1922 that Mr. J.C. Pauw became the school's first permanent principal. Mr. A.J.P. "Koos" Burger became its first permanent teacher a few months later. In early 1923, the school moved to a refurbished iron building, now with nearly 140 students ranging from standard seven to eight (now grades 9 and 10). The school's governing body decided to change the school's name to Hoër Volkskool Potchefstroom on 30 October 1923. The school was built on grounds previously used as the Potchefstroom Agricultural Showground.

The cornerstone of the permanent school building, still in use to the present day, was laid on the 10th of June 1927 and it was put into use on 23 February the following year. Amongst the speakers at the official opening was then Administrator of the Transvaal, Jan H. Hofmeyr. In 1934 Mr Pauw was appointed as the Inspector of Education in the Transvaal, and Mr. C.H. Steyn took over as principal.

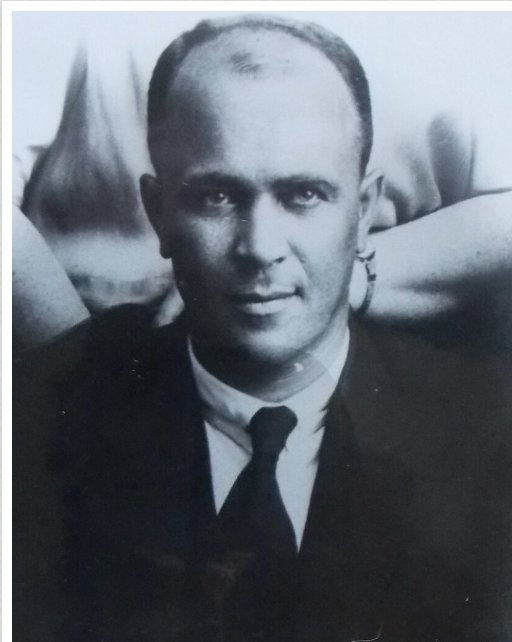
Mr Jack Pauw

== Head Masters ==
- Mr van der Lingen (acting)
- Mr Jack Pauw
- Mr C H Steyn
- Mr A J du Preez van Wyk
- Mr N G Hudson
- Mr J F Lombard
- Dr F B Muller
- Mr A van Rooijen
- Mr C J Britz
- Mr AJ van Rensburg
- Mr J T Swart
- Mr T Nicholenas
- Mr PW van Aswegen

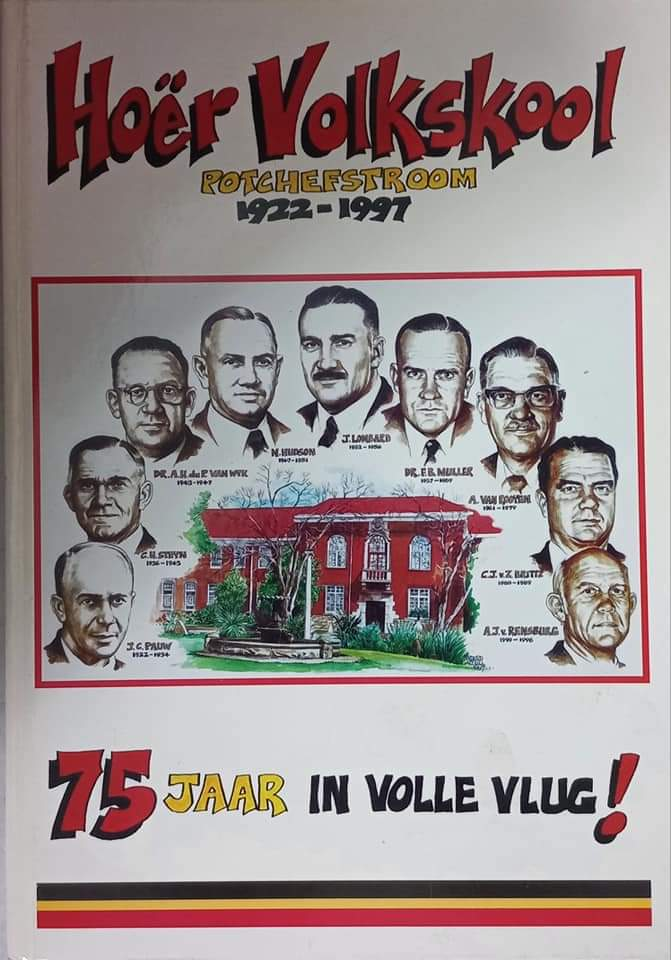

== Colours and motto ==
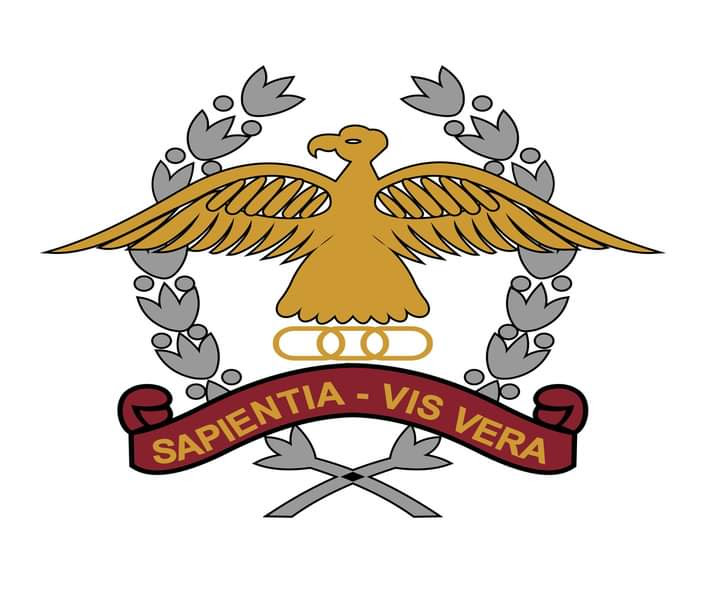
School Coat of Arms

The eagle on the badge symbolises victory. The three links in the chain symbolise unity, loyalty and good spirit. Koos Burger designed the badge. The school's colours were decided on in 1925 and consisted of black (inspired by Mr. Pauw's beloved jacket), gold (representing Potchefstroom's rich gold reserves) and wine red (burgundy) to form a harmony between them. The school's motto, Sapientia Vis Vera, means "Wisdom is true power" and was introduced along with the current badge in 1926. It was suggested by co-founder, Mr. Van der Lingen. In modern times, during the period of mr Swart's principalship, red was introduced as a school colour though the original burgundy still features in the school pinstripe tie.

The original common school blazer was a black pinstripe jacket with the school emblem on the breast pocket. The pinstripes were gold and burgundy. The current broad pinstripe blazer is worn by members of the first team in various sports. The original honours blazer was plain black with an embroidered emblem and the award embroidered above the emblem. Neither scrolls nor cords were worn, which is the current custom. The uniform can be seen in the photo of the 1983 Rugby Director's Cup winning team below:

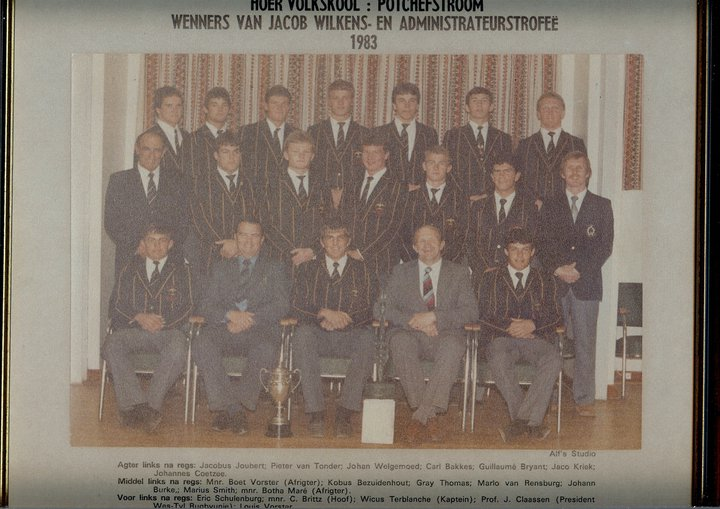

The school traditionally had a dress code for cultural events. This consisted of black trousers with white shirt for boys or long black skirts and white blouse for girls with the school blazer and tie. This was worn when representing the school at cultural events or when attending such events.

== Sport ==
=== Cricket ===
Volkies has high quality cricket facilities, including indoor and outdoor nets and three cricket fields.

It engages in annual friendly matches against top cricketing schools including Jeppe High School for Boys, Afrikaanse Hoër Seunskool and Hoërskool Menlopark, as well as competing in the annual North West Super League competition. It enters a First XI and Second XI as well as an U/15A and U/15B team into these competitions. The first XI has won the Super League several times, including three times in succession since 2017, whereas the U/15A team has taken the title six consecutive times since 2014. As of 22 October 2019, the first XI is ranked 48th in the national rankings. The school's First XI was ranked at no 12 nationally in 2021 on 23 November 2021. As at 6 February 2023, the First XI is ranked 36 nationally, ending 2023 at no 26.

The school had achieved the "double" ( Administrator's Cup for rugby and cricket in the same year) thrice – in 1939,1961 and 1976. In 1983, the school won the Director's Trophy for rugby and reached the final in cricket, losing a tightly contested game against Hoërskool Randburg.

Ludwig Schuld was selected for the Cricket South Africa (CSA) squads that participated in the annual Cubs Week played in Stellenbosch from 4 to 8 January 2023 as well as the South African Under 19 cricket team in 2023.

Various members of the 2022 First XI were ranked in the Gauteng Lions Schools Cricket Season 2022/2023:

- D Liebenberg #70
- L Mey #73
- J Visser #79
- C Smit #90
- J Moolman #131
- K Pienaar #144
- D vd Merwe #150
- L Schuld #177

Ludwig Schuld was reselected for the South African Schools side in 2023, following the U.19 Khaya Majola-krieketweek in Makhanda. He scored 3 centuries over the course of his successive Khaya Majola-krieketweeks, emulating AB de Villiers, Pieter Malan and. Andrea Agathangelou.

=== Rugby ===
In the early years of the establishment of the Western Transvaal Rugby Football Union (currently the Leopards) in 1958, Potch Volkies formed the nucleus of the Western Transvaal provincial schools team. Notable coaches were Nic du Plessis (Springbok lock), Johan Claassen (Springbok lock), Jack Pauw, Victor Hesse, A.W. Muller, Nico Hudson, Peet van der Walt (coach of the teams that achieved the triple between 1949–1951), Willem Kruger, Andrew Bird (Junior Springbok), Spiere van Rensburg and as mentioned below, Boet Vorster.

Jack Pauw, who represented Western Transvaal at flyhalf against the 1924 Lions and participated in the Springbok trials in 1912, was the first rugby coach at the school which embraced the game from the start. The boys' boarding house is named after Mr Pauw. Between 1964 and 2004, the school sent 188 players to Craven Week, six of whom were selected for the SA Schools team.

The first Cup win was in 1939 when the 1st XV won the Administrator's Cup. Volkies has won the Administrator's/Director's/Beeld Trophy in 1939 (vs Hoërskool Monument), 1949 (Hoër Volkskool Heidelberg), 1950 ( Hoër Volkskool Heidelberg), 1951 (Helpmekaar Hoërskool), 1961 (shared with Hoërskool Rustenburg), 1976 (Hoërskool Nelspruit) and 1983 (Hoërskool Erasmus). The school also contested the final of the Cup in 1945 (vs Heidelberg Volkskool), 1965 (Hoërskool Ben Viljoen), 1969 (Hoërskool Die Fakkel) and 1970 (Afrikaanse Hoër Seunskool).

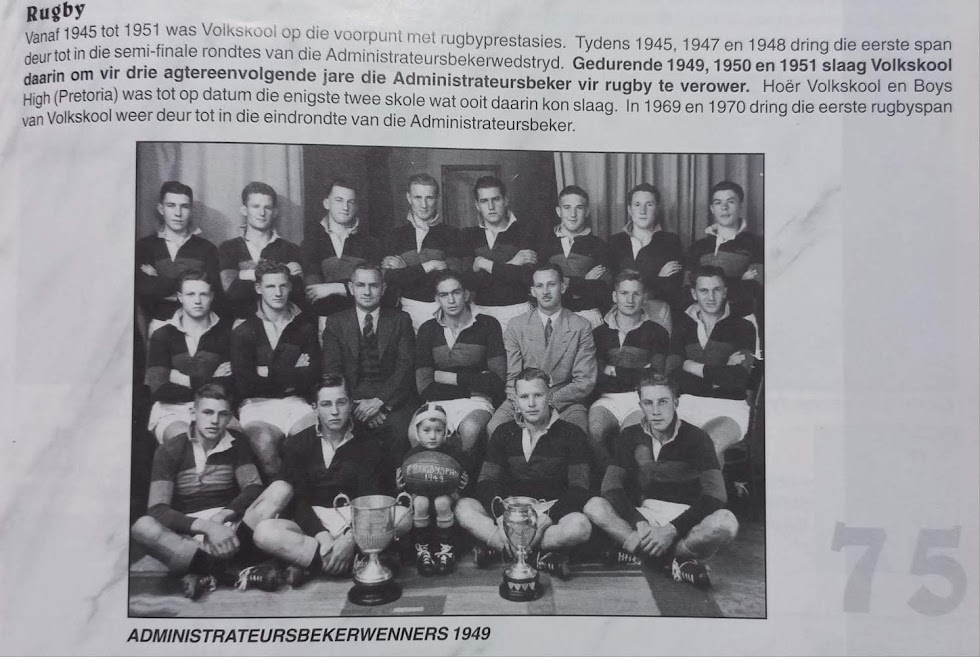

There have been four Old Boy Springboks – Nic Bierman, Daan du Plessis, Niek Bezuidenhout and Jorrie Muller. Jorrie Muller attended the school playing at scrumhalf in the 1996 First XV which won the Super 10 schools tournament, but actually matriculated from Monument Hoërskool and was selected for the 1999 South African Schools side and the victorious 2002 Junior Springbok side.

The following pupils were selected to represent the South African Schools rugby team:

- Francois Botha -1980
- Fanie Barnard (Kierie) – 1981
- Stephan van Coller – 1981
- Andries Engelbrecht – 1981
- Gray Thomas – 1984
- Jorrie Muller – 1999

== Notable alumni ==
- Roelof Frederik "Pik" Botha, DMS (27 April 1932 – 12 October 2018) was a South African politician who served as the country's minister of Foreign Affairs and acting President on occasion. He succeeded Mr Hilgard Muller as Minister of Foreign Affairs and served as the ambassador to the United States.Botha began his career in the South African foreign service in 1953, serving in Sweden and West Germany. From 1963 to 1966, he served on the team representing South Africa at the International Court of Justice in The Hague in the matter of Ethiopia and Liberia v. South Africa, over the South African occupation of South-West Africa (now Namibia).
- Hilgard Muller, DMS (4 May 1914 – 10 July 1985) was a South African politician of the National Party, Mayor of Pretoria in 1953–1955, elected an MP in 1958, appointed Minister of Foreign Affairs after the resignation of Eric Louw in 1964.
- Louis le Grange (16 August 1928 – 25 October 1991) was a lawyer, a South African politician, matriculated Potchefstroom Hoër Volkskool in 1946. He was a member of the National Party, Member of Parliament for the constituency of Potchefstroom (1966–1991), Deputy Minister of Information (1975–1978), Interior (1975–1978), Immigration (1978), and Public Works (1978), in the government of John Vorster. He then served as Minister of Tourism and Public Works (1978–1979), Prisons (1979–1980), Police (1979–1982) and Law and Order (1982–1986) in the cabinet of P.W. Botha, before he became the 13th Speaker of the House of Assembly of South Africa (1987–1991).
- Nic Bierman Lieutenant-General Jacobus Nicolas Bierman SSA SM CBE (1910–1977) was a South African military commander. He played for the Springboks in 1931.He served as Army Chief of Staff from 1958 to 1959.
- Ferdi Hartzenberg (Ferdinand), 8 January 1936 – 12 March 2021, South African politician and eminent Bonsmara cattle farmer. He obtained the following degrees: BSc (Agriculture), MSc (Agriculture), DSc (Agriculture) at Pretoria University.He was Minister of Education & Training, a post he held until March 1982 when he resigned to join Andries Treurnicht's breakaway Conservative Party.
- Willem Hartzenberg, Judge of the High Court of South Africa who presided over several high-profile cases during his career, including the trial of Wouter Basson. He retired in 2009 as the longest-serving judge in the country.
- Ben H. Wilkins, Deputy Minister of Co-operation and Development
- af:C.K. Oberholzer Professor Dr Carel Krugel Oberholzer born 17 December 1904 Potchefstroom, eminent philosopher and academic at the Normaalkollege in Pretoria as well as the University of South Africa, noted for his seminal contribution to the philosophy of Existentialism, Phenomenology and the philosophy of Anthropology in South Africa. He was awarded the Stalsprys vir Filosofie van die SA Akademie in 1967.
- Professor Dr Johannes Hendrik Koekemoer, theologian, born 27 August 1935 at Losberg, whose career as a minister of the Nederduitsch Hervormde Kerk started in 1960. In 1989 he became a full member and in 1992 Dean of the Faculty of Theology (Section A), University of Pretoria. He played a major role in the restructuring and amalgamation of the Faculty of Theology. This second part of his career ended on 31 December 1999 when he retired.
- Jacobus "Jackie" Pretorius (22 November 1934 in Potchefstroom – 30 March 2009 in Johannesburg) was a racing driver from South Africa. He participated in four Formula One World Championship Grands Prix, debuting on 1 January 1965
- Frederik (Frik) Johannes Els, born on 31 October 1955 in Wolmaransstad – 2020, represented Western Transvaal in athletics and rugby, and South Africa in Korfball.
- Daan du Plessis Daniël Coenraad du Plessis(born 9 August 1948 in Potchefstroom) is a former Springbok rugby player, representing the national side at prop. He is also an eminent orthopaedic surgeon, specialising in sports injuries and replacement surgery, particularly knee surgery.
- Louis Vorster (2 November 1966 – 17 April 2012) was a South African-Namibian cricketer. Played at flyhalf in the 1983 Director's Trophy rugby union winning team against Hoërskool Erasmus. He was selected for the SA Schools Cricket Tour of England in 1983. Played first-class cricket, representing Transvaal, Western Transvaal, Northern Transvaal and at county level for Worcestershire in England.
- Eugène Ney Terre'Blanche, (31 January 1941 – 3 April 2010) was an Afrikaner nationalist, former police officer and political figure who founded and led the Afrikaner Weerstandsbeweging (AWB). Terre'Blanche attended Laerskool Ventersdorp and Hoër Volkskool in Potchefstroom, matriculating in 1962. While in school, he gave early expression to his political leanings by founding the cultural organisation Jong Afrikanerharte (Young Afrikaner Hearts)
- James Hubert Kingston(born 30 November 1965, Ottosdal, South Africa), a South African professional golfer on the Asian and European Golf tours. In 2007 he finished top of the Order of Merit on the Sunshine Tour. Former World Top 100 golfer.
- Martin Johannes Knoetze, born 18 June 1963, Mafikeng, South African rugby player, representing Western Transvaal, Northern Transvaal, Transvaal and the Eastern Province at Full back, Centre, Wing and Flyhalf. Voted one of the five South African Young Players of the Year for 1986, along with Keith Andrews, Hendrik Kruger, Tiaan Strauss and Frans Wessels. Selected for a World XV. He coached rugby in San Diego, US.
- Jaco Engels, Namibian international rugby player Jaco Barny Engels (born 17 December 1980, in Oranjemund), a Namibian international rugby union player whose usual position is prop. As youngster while at primary school, Laerskool M.L. Fick, he was awarded Springbok / National Colours in Trampolining.
- Arno Jacobs (born 13 March 1977 in Potchefstroom) is a South African former first-class cricketer previously playing for the Warriors and current umpire. He also represented South Africa A and Scotland in cricket.
- Stefan Jacobs, born. 11 March 1966, Virginia, Orange Free State, first-class cricketer, representing Transvaal.
- Amanda Mynhardt, born 9 January 1986, former South African Protea netball international and captain
- Elsunet du Plessis, born 3 June 1987 at Heidelberg, Gauteng, known as "Kiekie", former South Africa netball Protea international and coach. She currently serves as the head coach of the North West Flames and the North-West University (NWU) Eagles.https://news.nwu.ac.za/protea-star-appointed-nwu-coach
- Ine-Marí Venter, South Africa u/19 and Protea netball international, born 21 April 1995 is a South African netball player in the Suncorp Super Netball league, playing for the Queensland Firebirds.
- Willie Esterhuizen, actor, writer and director
- Glenda Kemp, exotic dancer, activist and teacher
- Niek Bezuidenhout, Nicolaas Stephanus Erasmus 'Niek' Bezuidenhout (born 4 August 1950), a former South African rugby union player. During 1974, he played in three tests against the British Lions and two tests during South Africa's tour of France. Bezuidenhout played a further two tests against France and his final test was in 1977 against the World XV. Bezuidenhout played nine test matches and four tour matches for the Springboks.
- François Pieters (born 6 November 1988), represented South Korea in cricket at the 2018 and 2024 ICC T20 World Cup qualifiers.
- Jan Lewis (Berty) Visser played rugby for Slovakia during the 2025–26 Rugby Europe International Championships.
