= Ockert Potgieter =

South African missionary (1965–2021)

Personal details
- Born: Ockert Potgieter; 11 December 1965
- Died: 11 October 2021 (aged 55) Mossel Bay, South Africa
- Cause of death: COVID-19
- Spouse: Michelle Cilliers
- Children: 5
- Education: Potchefstroom Gymnasium, Potchefstroom University for Christian Higher Education
- Known for: Missionary work, Film Director

Ockert Potgieter (Ukrainian: Окерт Потгітер; 11 December 1965 – 11 October 2021) was a South African missionary in Ukraine and a film director.

== Education ==
Potgieter completed his school years at Potchefstroom Gimnasium. He studied further in Law at the Potchefstroom University for Christian Higher Education and after finishing his undergraduate studies he did a PhD in Law. He was awarded the honor of being the best Law student in South Africa. He received the Lawyer’s student award in 1989 from the Loyalty Fund. He finished a diploma in Social Law at Rijkuniversisteit Ghent, Belgium in conjunction with Stellenbosch University.

== Missionary work ==
After Potgieter guided a student group through Ukraine, he and his wife decided to establish a church in Reni, Ukraine. Reni is a town in the Odesa Oblast Province. It is a southwest Ukrainian town close to the Romanian border next to the Danube River. He and his wife Michelle established a church called the “Light of the World” (Світло світу) in 1990. They have been running community uplifting programmes since then. They focussed on the part of Reni that is poor and has unmaintained infrastructure. In the area they worked, most houses did not have electricity, or a toilet in the house. Most houses' toilets were outside. Proper water access was limited, and electricity was only available 6 hours a day. Potgieter started a campaign called “I Love Reni”. It is a project that maintains and repairs infrastructure, cleans the city, provided water, upgrades roads and does paint work. Voluntary social workers from the UK are helping once a year. For these projects he partnered up with Jubilee Church Maidstone, UK and the Mayor of Reni, Igor Plegov. A kindergarten school was established as well as a programme to enrich children's lives by exposing them to different countries and culture. The Potgieters have been attacked in the past by armed men but survived it and continued to do missionary work there.

== Film director ==
Potgieter was the director and writer of the movie “Enough” (Russian: Хватит - новый русский фильм) a Russian film released in 2013. It is a film made by New Day Films. The slogan is: In every life, there comes a time to let go”. The film is a story of hate, war and betrayal, with love the only way to overcome it. It was set in Russia in 1917. Two children escaped the war and had to survive on their own. Years later, one of the survivors retraced his steps to find peace. It was filmed in Ukraine.

== Death ==
Potgieter died from COVID-19 pneumonia during the COVID-19 pandemic in South Africa, at age 55.
