= Colesberg =

Town in Northern Cape, South Africa

Colesberg Koolsberg in Afrikaans orthography
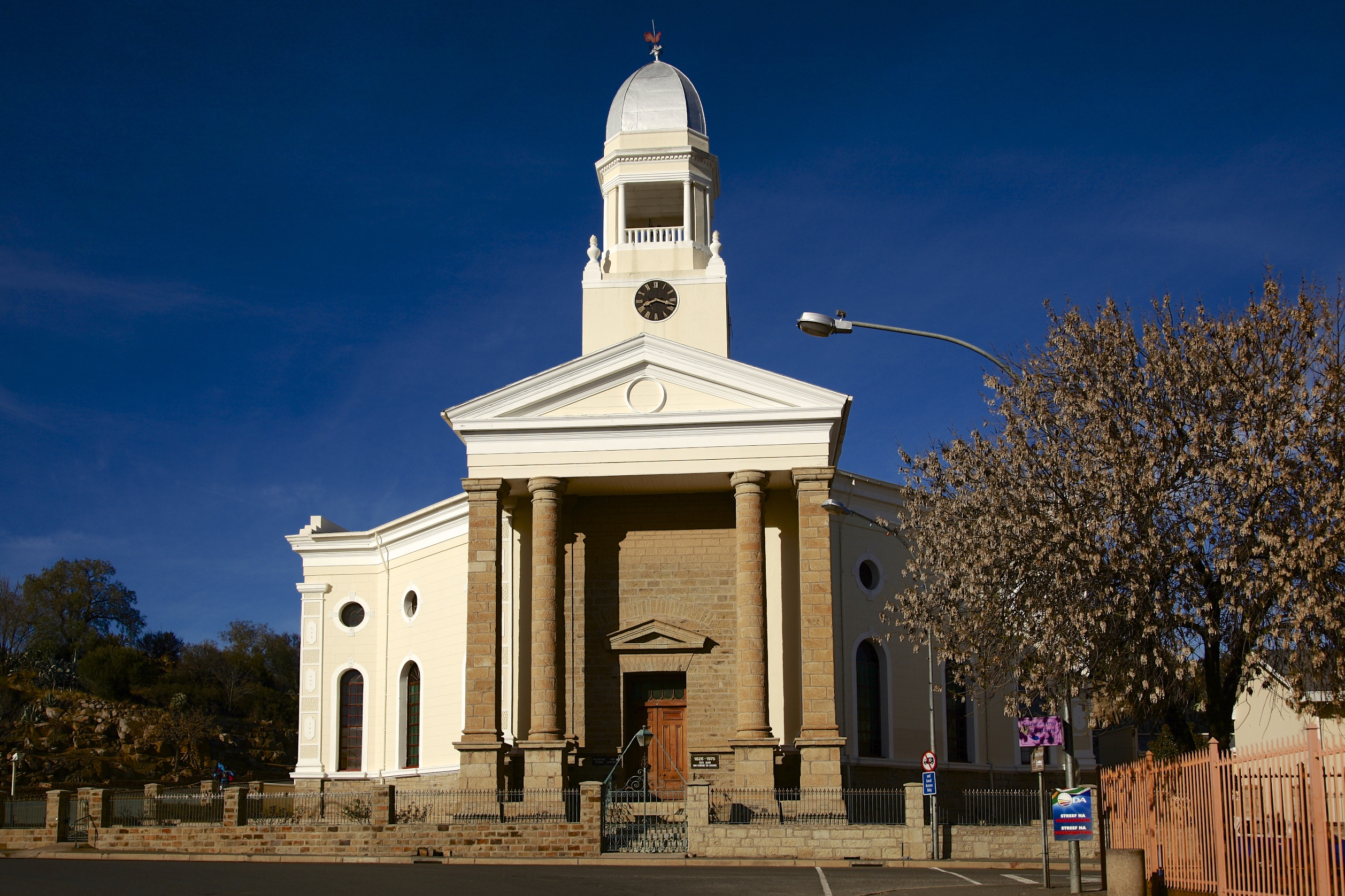
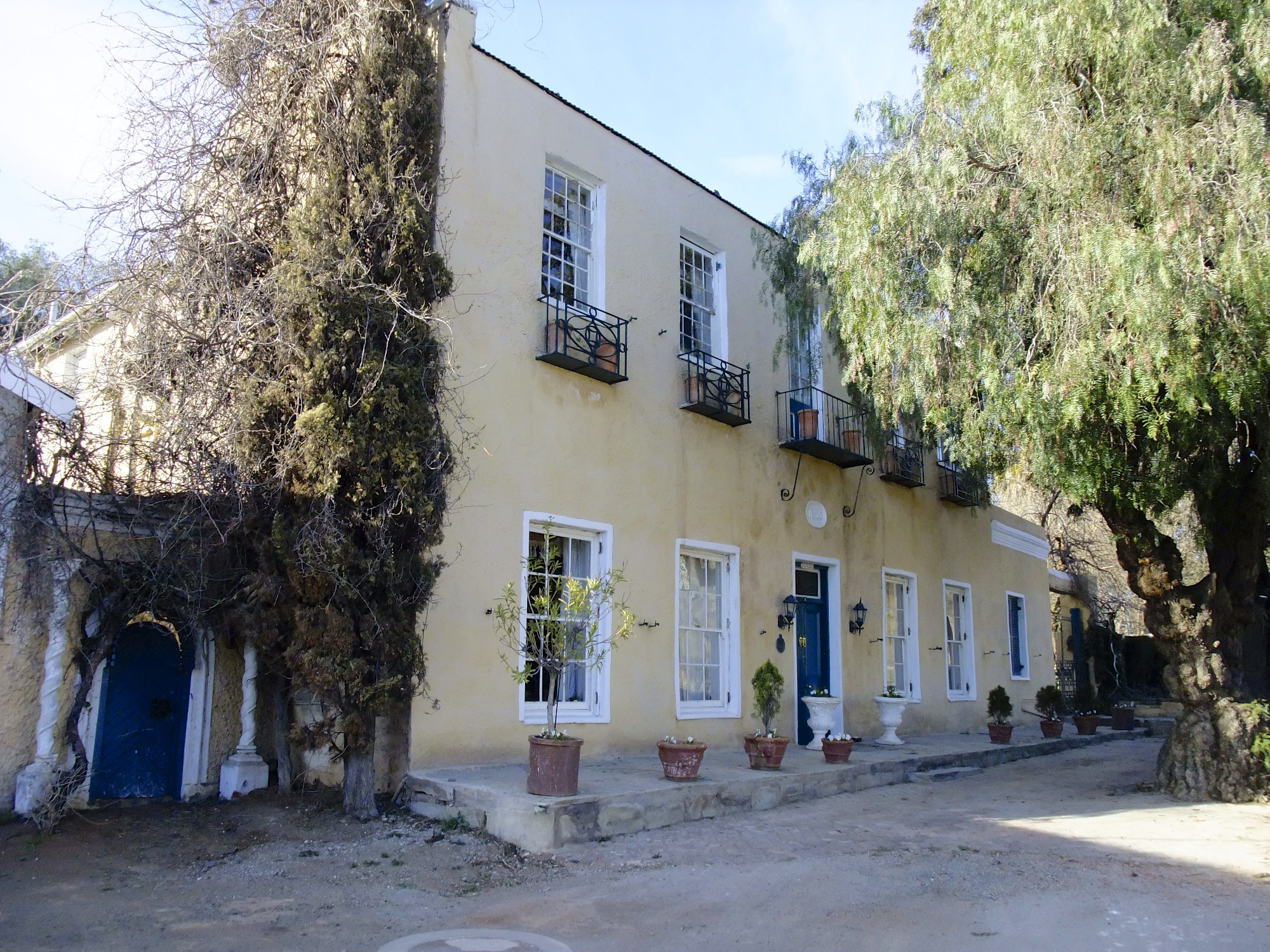
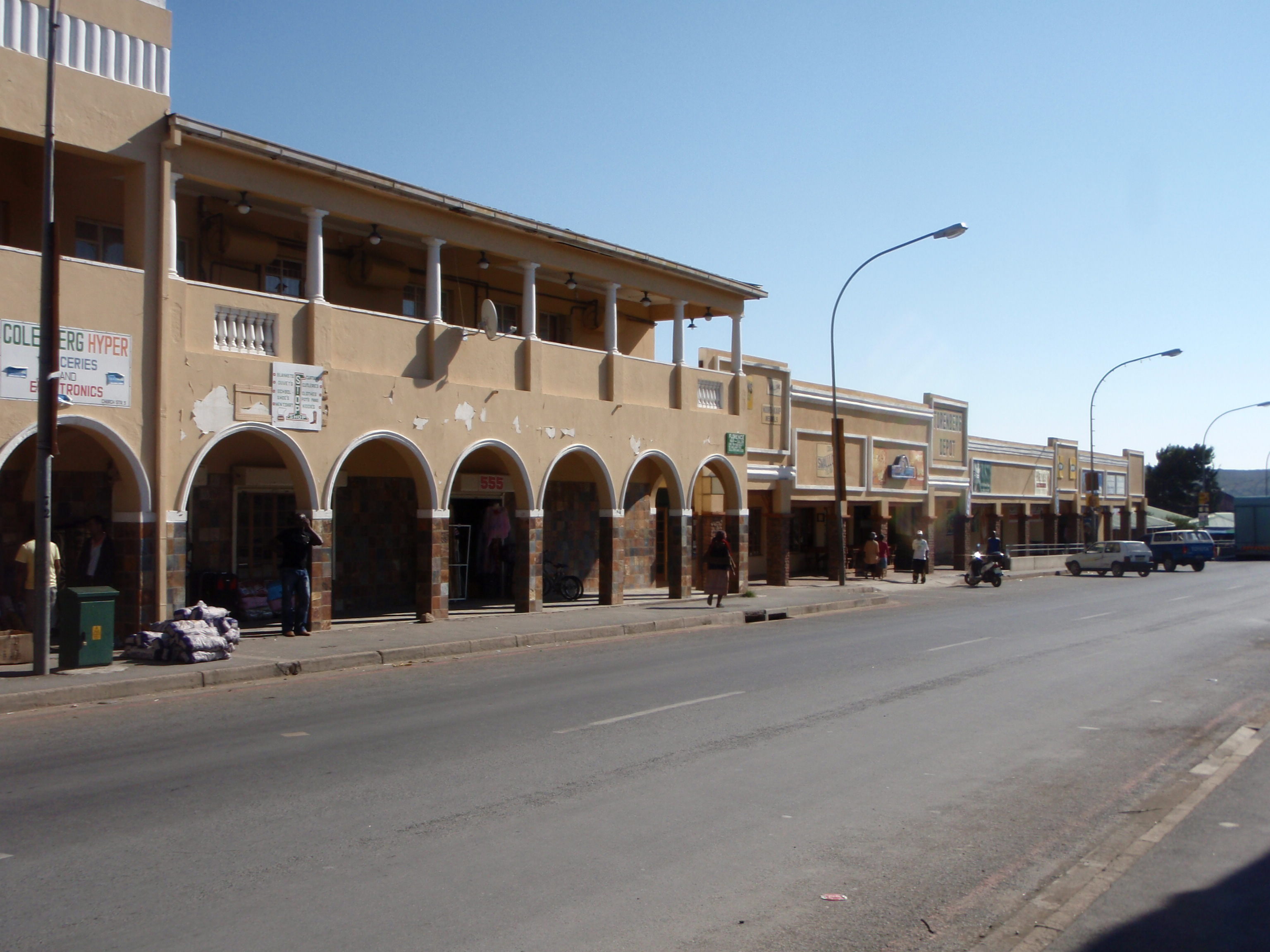
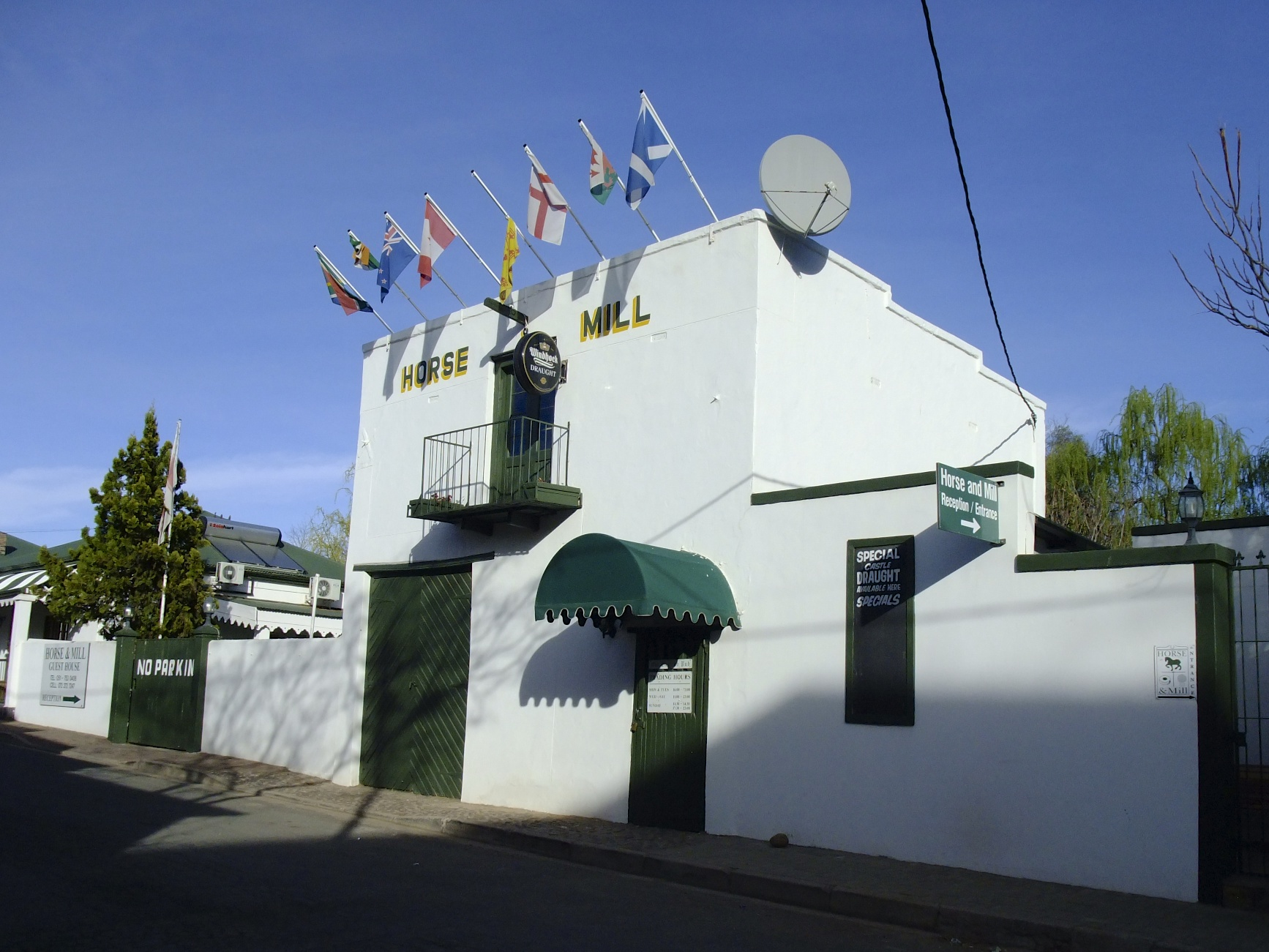
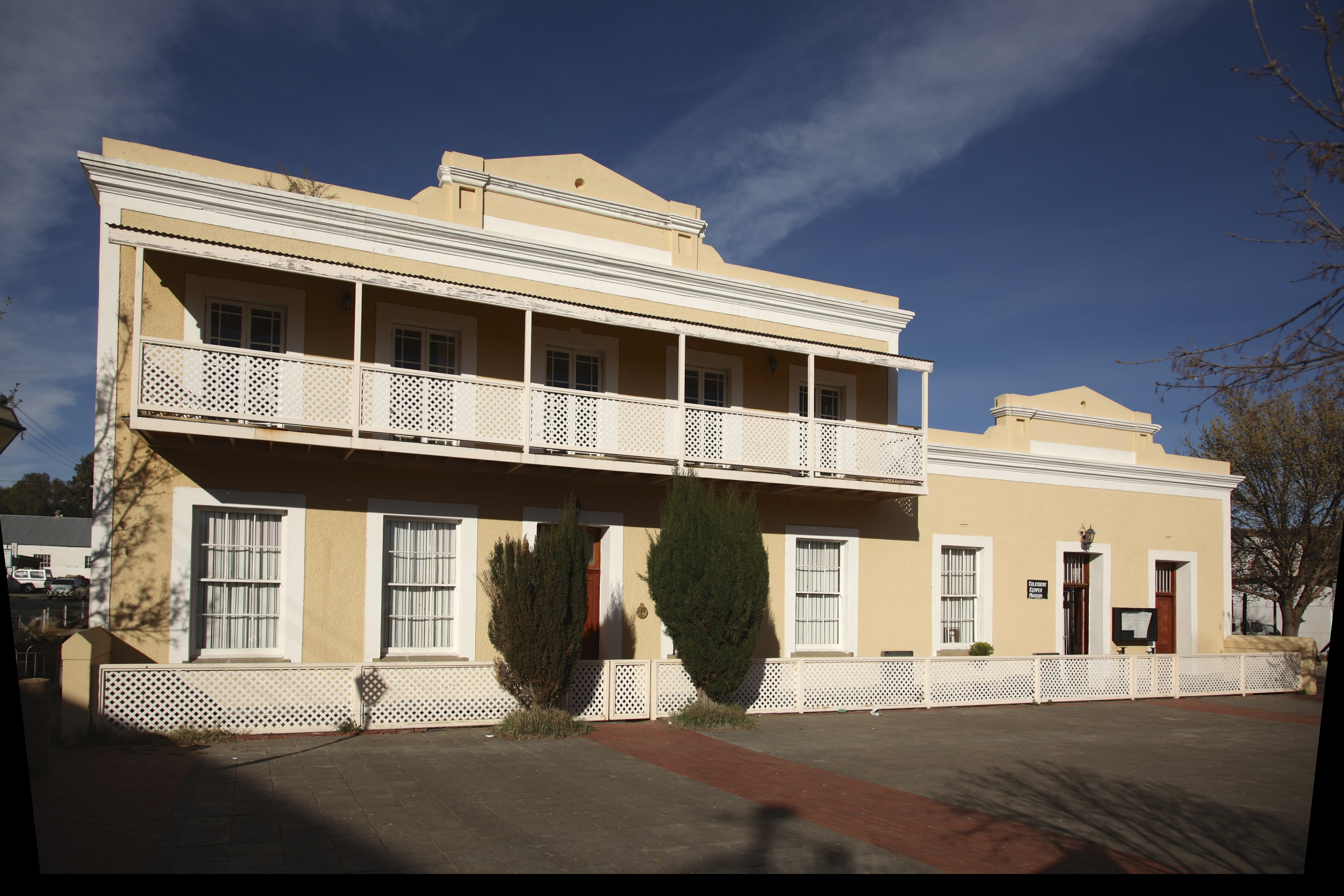
- Top:Dutch Reformed Church, middle left: Coniston House, right: Main Street, bottom left: Horse and Mill, right: Kemper Museum.

- Location within Northern Cape Location within South Africa Location within Africa
- Coordinates: 30°43′00″S 25°06′00″E
- Country: South Africa
- Province: Northern Cape
- District: Pixley ka Seme
- Municipality: Umsobomvu
- Established: 1830

Area
  - Total: 174.84 km^{2} (67.51 sq mi)

Population (2011)
  - Total: 16,869
  - Density: 96.482/km^{2} (249.89/sq mi)

Racial makeup (2011)
  - Black African: 67.4%
  - Coloured: 25.7%
  - Indian/Asian: 0.6%
  - White: 5.3%
  - Other: 1.0%

First languages (2011)
  - Xhosa: 59.5%
  - Afrikaans: 33.1%
  - Sotho: 2.8%
  - English: 1.8%
  - Other: 2.9%
- Time zone: UTC+2 (SAST)
- Postal code (street): 9795
- PO box: 9795
- Area code: 051

Colesberg is a town with 17,354 inhabitants in the Northern Cape province of South Africa, located on the main N1 road from Cape Town to Johannesburg.

In a sheep-farming area spread over half-a-million hectares, greater Colesberg breeds many of the country's top merinos. It is also renowned for producing high-quality racehorses and many stud farms, including one owned by renowned golfer, Gary Player, are nearby.

== History ==
Founded in 1830 on an abandoned station of the London Missionary Society, and initially named Toverberg after a nearby hill, it was renamed Colesberg after Sir Galbraith Lowry Cole, then Governor of the Cape Colony. The site of the town lay on one of the well-travelled routes used by traders, hunters and explorers to gain access to the interior. Towerberg or Coleskop is a prominent hill near the town and a landmark easily seen from a distance by travellers.

Colesberg saw a large number of battles and skirmishes during the second Anglo-Boer War, and the Colesberg Garden of Remembrance is located just outside the town.

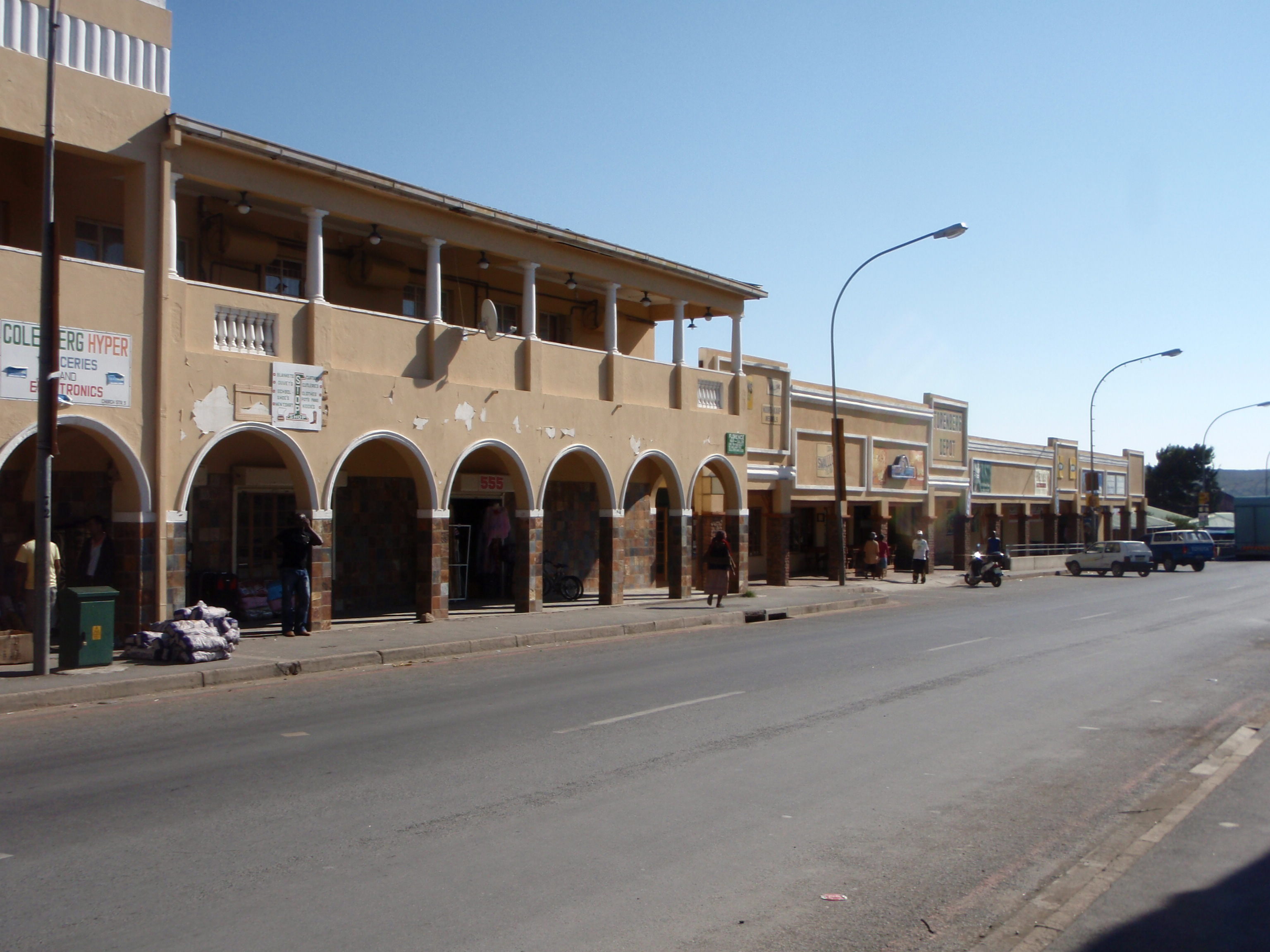
Another view of part of the main street

A number of 1820 Settlers established farms in the Colesberg district. Outnumbered as a religious group, some attended the Methodist Church and others the Dutch Reformed Church, where services in English were specially held for them. Anglican officials in Cape Town appointed Dr CEH Orpen as rector and the first services were conducted in the Court House and the London Mission Chapel, which became known as St Stephen's Church. In 1852 the construction of the Anglican Christ Church was started, having been designed by Sophy Gray, wife of the Cape Town bishop Robert Gray.

The Colesberg Bank was founded in 1861. Michael Davitt wrote while documenting the Second Boer War, that the previous generation noted the village as a rendezvous for hunters and diamond miners.

== Notable people ==
- Hennie Bingle, rector of the PUK
- General Piet Cronje, a South African general in both the Anglo-Boer wars.
- Danie du Plessis, Head of the South African Railways & co-founder of The Afrikaner Broederbond
- Frans du Toit, a South African Economist, and Trade Commissioner.
- Ricardo Loubscher, South Africa national rugby union team player & rugby coach
- Zamani Saul, Premier of the Northern Cape
- Nicolaas Theunissen, South African Test cricketer
- Nombulelo Lilian Hermans (Former ANC regional treasurer and regional deputy chairperson, Member of the National Assembly of South Africa)

== Cityscape ==
=== Architecture ===
The town boasts many buildings that were built in a blend of Cape Dutch and Georgian architecture with ceilings of reed, and yellowwood timbers, and others that display a range of designs reflecting the changes of 19th-century building. Originally plots were pegged out and sold on the site of the town to fund the building of the Dutch Reformed church.

== Society and culture ==
=== Museums, monuments and memorials ===
A large number of Heritage Sites registered with the South African Heritage Resources Agency are located in Colesberg.

== Economy ==
Farming in the area is dedicated almost entirely to horses and merino sheep. While in a sheep-farming area spread over half-a-million hectares, greater Colesberg breeds many of the country's top merinos. Colesberg is renowned for producing high-quality racehorses and many stud farms, including one owned by legendary golfer, Gary Player, are nearby. The ostrich-feather boom of the early 1900s, which left many farmers rich, is long forgotten.

The town has a thriving tourism industry, in part because it represents a rough halfway point between Johannesburg and Cape Town. There is a hotel, a motel, and many guest houses and B&Bs around town, most having restaurants and pubs on-site. Several guest farms operate in the district offering accommodation with 4x4 trails, mountain bike trails, game hunting (mainly springbok, wildebeest and blesbok) and bird watching. Three major service stations with on-site shops, restaurants and toilet facilities are located on the N1 at Colesberg. Small industries are located in town, including a sheep abattoir, a factory which makes a range of furniture to order and a panel beater.

The Doornkloof Nature Reserve is located near Colesberg on the confluence of the Orange and Seekoei Rivers.

== See also ==
- De Boeren Courant
