= Ferdinand Postma =

South African male writer

Rector of Potchefstroom University for Christian Higher Education
- In office 1921–1950
- Preceded by: Office established
- Succeeded by: Van Rooy, J.C.

Personal details
- Born: 15 July 1879 Aliwal North, South Africa
- Died: 4 November 1950 (aged 71) Potchefstroom, South Africa
- Spouse: Margaretha Jacoba Coetsee
- Education: Vrije Universiteit

Ferdinand Postma was the first rector of the Potchefstroom University for Christian Higher Education, in Potchefstroom, South Africa.

== Personal life ==
Postma was the second son of Marthinus Postma and Elizabeth Wilhelmina Josina Spiller. He was born on 15 July 1879 in Aliwal North, Eastern Cape Province, South Africa. In 1880 the family moved to Burgersdorp. Up till 1890 he went to school in Burgersdorp. In 1890 his father, a pastor moved to Middelburg and Postma attend the Christian school there. He passed standard 10 (grade 12) in 1896 in Burgersdorp. He passed the intermediate exam of the University of Good Hope in Cape Town. After the local war in South Africa he studied with a bursary at the Vrije Universiteit, Amsterdam, the Netherlands. Here he completed his Theological studies. In 1903 he obtained the qualification Litterarum Humaniorum Candidatus. He was married to Margaretha Jacoba Coetsee. He died in Potchefstroom on 4 November 1950.

== Education ==
In January 1904 he became a professor in literature at the Theological Centre of the Reformed Church in Potchefstroom. He was involved in the establishing of the first Afrikaans School in Potchefstroom, called Potchefstroom Gimnasium. In 1913 he studied further in Classical language in the Netherlands and obtained his PhD with the title:” De Numine Devino quid senserit Vergilius". In 1919 he became the first rector of the Potchefstroom University for Christian Higher Education. From 1936 to 1938 he was chairman of the senate of University of South Africa. An honorary PhD, Doctor Educationis honoris was awarded to him by the University of South Africa.

== Writer ==
He wrote the following books:

- (Afrikaans) Hy het sy merk gemaak. (Translated: He made his mark )
- Kleopatra
- (Afrikaans) Beknopte woordeboek: Afrikaans-Latyn / Latyn-Afrikaans (translated: Concised dictionary Afrikaans- Latin, Latin –Afrikaans)
- (Afrikaans) Vuurpyle (translated: Rockets)
- (Afrikaans) Paul Kruger: Christen-Volksman-Staatsman (translated: Paul Kruger, Christian, father of the Nation, Statesman)
- (Afrikaans) Paulus, ’n geroepe apostel van Jesus Christus (translated: Paul a disciple of Jesus Christ)
- (Afrikaans) Erfstukke uit die klassieke oudheid (translated: Classic inherited peaces)

== Recognition ==
A high school in Potchefstroom is named after him and also the university library.
