= De Boeren Courant =

De Boeren Courant was a newspaper that operated from Colesberg in the Cape Colony, from 1871 to 1873.
