= Tjaart Marais =

South African rugby union player

- Born: 21 July 1961 (age 65)
- School: Potchefstroom Gimnasium
- University: Potchefstroom University for Christian Higher Education

Rugby union career
- Position: Fly-half
Provincial / State sides
Years	Team	Apps	(Points)
1980-1990	Western Transvaal, Northern Transvaal		(1150)

Tjaart Marais was a South African rugby fly-half and still played in the era when rugby was an amateur sport.

== Education ==
Marais was born on 21 July 1961. He matriculated on Potchefstroom Gimnasium and went on to complete his undergraduate studies at the Potchefstroom University for Christian Higher Education. He only has sight in one eye.

== Rugby records ==
Marais played rugby for Western Transvaal and later for Northern Transvaal from 1980 to 1990

His records are:

- Currie Cup points 703
- Overall points in his career 1150
- Currie Cup Points in a season -168 in 1988
- Overall points in a season -271 in 1988
- Most points in a game 31 – for Western Transvaal against East Free State
- Try conversions in a game 14 - for Western Transvaal against East Free State
