= Jan Kamp =

Journalist in the Netherlands and South Africa

Personal details
- Born: 12 December 1862 Enschede, The Netherlands
- Died: 25 July 1924 (aged 61) Potchefstroom, South Africa
- Spouse: Margaretha Maria Elizabeth Herman
- Children: 4
- Known for: Journalist, teacher, lecturer, writer and promoter of the Afrikaans language.

Jan Kamp (12 December 1862 - 25 July 1924) was a journalist in the Netherlands and South Africa, a school teacher, and a university professor in literature. He emigrated to South Africa where he became a promoter of the academic use of the Afrikaans language.

== Roots ==
Kamp was born on 12 December 1862 in Enschede, The Netherlands, the son of Hermen Kamp and Gezina Luijerink. He received training as a teacher and later studied at the Rijksuniversiteit Utrecht, the Netherlands. In South Africa, he married a Dutch immigrant Margaretha Maria Elizabeth Herman who gave him four children.

== Journalist ==
While still in the Netherlands, Kamp was one of the editors of the newspaper De Standaard (Dutch for The Standard). In the later years as a lecturer he was at the same editor of Het Westen (Dutch for The West), and Ons Vaderland (Our Fatherland, 1915) and Het Volk (The Nation), all local newspapers.

== Teaching ==
In South Africa Kamp taught at schools in Pretoria, Rustenburg, and Nigel. While he was a lecturer in his later years, he always stayed involved in schools. Kamp was on the committee that founded Potchefstroom Gimnasium, an Afrikaans High School in Potchefstroom in 1907.

== Lecturer ==
In 1905 he started to work at the Theologian Centre of the Reformed Church in Potchefstroom. In 1912 he became a Professor there specialising in literature and continued until his death in Potchefstroom on 25 July 1924.

== Publications by Kamp ==
- 1909 - Proeve van inleiding tot de Nederlandse letterkunde
- 1912 - De nieuwe richting in de Nederlandse letterkunde
- 1912 - De school hoort aan de ouders

== Afrikaans language ==
As a lecturer he appreciated Afrikaans poems and stories and helped young students to better their Afrikaans. When on the committee for Potchefstroom Gimnasium he also was in favour of it becoming an Afrikaans medium School.
