= Hendrik Johannes Jacob Bingle =

South African educator and Calvinist

Rector of the Potchefstroom University for Christian Higher Education
- In office 1964–1977
- Preceded by: Chris Coetzee
- Succeeded by: Tjaart van der Walt

Chancellor of the Potchefstroom University for Christian Higher Education
- In office 1981–1991
- Preceded by: Pieter Vorster
- Succeeded by: F.W. de Klerk

Personal details
- Born: August 15, 1910 Colesberg, Cape Province, South Africa
- Died: June 29, 2007 (aged 96)
- Spouse: Anna Susanna de Klerk
- Education: Potchefstroom University for Christian Higher Education
- Known for: Calvinism and Education

Hendrik (Hennie) Johannes Jacob Bingle (1910–2007) was a Calvinist, educator and Rector of the Potchefstroom University for Christian Higher Education in Potchefstroom, South Africa.

== Roots ==
Bingle was born on 15 August 1910 in Colesberg, Cape Province, South Africa. He was the son of Pieter Willem Bingle and Albertje Catharina Andria Coetzee. He married Anna Susanna de Klerk in 1936. He died on 29 June 2007.

== Education ==
He passed matric at Paul Kruger High School in Steynsburg. He was a teacher at Steynsburg, Vryburg, Messina and in Johannesburg. In 1931 he worked at the State Archives. He obtained an M.Ed. in 1935 and in 1940 a PhD at the Potchefstroom University.

== Career ==
In 1945 he was appointed as a Senior Lecturer in Education at that University. In 1949 he was promoted to Professor. He was appointed as Dean of the Education department in 1951. He stayed dean until 1962. He was closely involved in the university becoming an independent one in 1951. He was one of the writers of the University's Statute. Op 20 November 1963 he was elected by the Universities Board as Rector. Bingle was a Calvinist, he founded an institute on campus for the promoting of Calvinism. He was chairman of the Afrikaans Calvinist Movement. The university grew in student numbers in his time as rector. He visited 16 universities worldwide to see how to expand the university constructively. He had close links to the Government of the day, via membership of national committees. The degree Doctor Educationis (Honoris Causa) were presented to him in 1981 and he received the Chancellor's medal in 2001. Today the student centre at campus carries his name.
