= Johannes Cornelis van Rooy =

Rector of the Potchefstroom University for Christian Higher Education
- In office 1950–1953
- Preceded by: Postma, F.
- Succeeded by: Coetzee, J.C.

Chancellor of the Potchefstroom University for Christian Higher Education
- In office 1953–1954
- Preceded by: du Toit, J.D.
- Succeeded by: du Toit, F.J.

Chairman of Afrikaner Broederbond
- In office 1932–1938
- Preceded by: du Plessis, L.J.
- Succeeded by: Diedericks, N.
- In office 1942–1952
- Preceded by: Diedericks, N.
- Succeeded by: Thom, H.B.

Personal details
- Born: July 9, 1890 Steynsburg, Cape Province, South Africa
- Died: August 29, 1954 (aged 64) Potchefstroom
- Spouse: Rachel Aletta Lion Cachet
- Education: University of South Africa; Vrije University Amsterdam

Johannes Cornelis (Joon) van Rooy (9 July 1890 — 19 August 1954) was Rector of the Potchefstroom University for Christian Higher Education and Chairman of the Afrikaner Broederbond.

== Roots ==
Van Rooy was born in Steynsburg in the North Eastern Cape. His parents were Henri Charles van Rooy and Hester Hendriena Coetsee. He married Rachel Aletta Lion Cachet, daughter of Jan Lion Cachet and Martha Sophia Viljoen. He died 29 August 1954 in Potchefstroom.

== Education ==
He obtained an undergraduate degree and master's degree at Unisa and studied at Vrije Universiteit in Amsterdam, the Netherlands.

== Career ==
He was the registrar of The Potchefstroom University for Christian Higher Education from 1927 to 1937. Thereafter he became Dean of the Faculty of Humanities and in 1950 rector at that University. While he was rector the University became an independent university in 1951. He remained in this position until his death. While at the university he was also chairman of the Federasie vir Afrikaanse Kultuurvereniginge for 10 years, from 1940-1950.

== Afrikaner Broederbond (AB) ==
He was the chairman of the AB from 1932-1938 and again from 1942-1952. The AB was an organisation whose membership was available only by invitation from an existing member, with the consensus of other members. It was only open to white males who were Afrikaans-speaking and Christian. Its main goal was for Afrikaners to dominate in South Africa.

== Recognition ==
The administration building at The Potchefstroom University for Christian Higher Education was named after him in 1993.
