= Francois Jacobus du Toit =

South African journalist

Chancellor of the Potchefstroom University for Christian Higher Education
- In office 1954–1961
- Preceded by: Johannes Cornelis van Rooy
- Succeeded by: Jan de Klerk

Personal details
- Born: 25 August 1897 Colesberg, Cape Colony
- Died: 17 March 1961 (aged 63) Bangkok, Thailand
- Spouse: Wilhelmina du Plessis
- Education: Paarl Gimnasium, Potchefstroom University for Christian Higher Education and University of Stellenbosch
- Occupation: politics, business, academia
- Known for: Union of South Africa Trade Commissioner in London

Francois Jacobus du Toit (25 August 1897 – 17 March 1961) was a South African journalist and economist who represented the Union of South Africa as Trade Commissioner in London, and later served as chancellor of the Potchefstroom University for Christian Higher Education.

== Early life and education ==
Du Toit was born on 25 August 1897 in Colesberg, Cape Colony. He was the son of Francois Jacobus du Toit (1861–1931), a South African senator, and Anna Sophia van der Walt. He was the oldest of five children.

He graduated from Paarl Gimnasium in 1915, studied at the theology school of the Reformed Churches in South Africa at Potchefstroom University and subsequently obtained a BA degree in economics and history from Stellenbosch University.

He married Wilhelmina du Plessis and was the father of Laurika Jerling du Toit, Anna Sophia Du Plessis du Toit, and Priv Zaaiman Du Toit.

== Career ==
Before starting his studies, Du Toit worked as a teacher in Schweizer-Reneke. After his graduation he worked as a journalist at Die Weste and Die Burger newspapers. In 1925, he was appointed as the first senior economist at the newly established section of Economy and Markets at the Union of South Africa's Department of Agriculture. In the same year he was sent to London to represent South Africa as Assistant Trade Commissioner.

He returned to South Africa in 1929, working in the Department of Agriculture as senior economist, chief clerk, and acting head of the Education section. He also became the founder and first chair of the South African Wool Growers' Association and well as various other agricultural associations.

Between 1929 and 1934, Du Toit made various overseas trips representing South African trade in North America and Asia. From 1934 to 1937, he represented the Union of South Africa as Trade Commissioner in London. Between 1939 and 1943 he was Deputy High Commissioner and Secretary in the South Africa House in London. During this time he also represented South Africa at numerous international conferences.

Between 1944 and 1949, he served as secretary of the Department of Trade and Industry in Pretoria. In 1947, he was appointed first chair of the Council for the Development of Natural Resources and was a member of the Council for Scientific and Industrial Research, in 1948 a member of the National Council for Social Research, and chair of Strategic Resources. In 1949, he became a director of Yskor, a state owned iron and steel producer, and in 1951 presiding director of Sasol, and in 1952 chairperson of Foskor, and the Staalafsetmaatshappy van Afrika. He also served as member of various state commissions, including in 1960 as chair of the Commission on white South Africans in rural areas.

Du Toit was a board member of various privately owned companies such as Sanlam, Federale Volk Beleggings, and the Nasionale Bouvereniging and was also a founding member of the Suid-Afrika Stigting.

== Chancellor ==
Du Toit became a member of the council of the Potchefstroom University in 1952, the University of South Africa in 1957, and the Afrikaans Academy for Science and Art in 1955.

In 1954, Du Toit was appointed as chancellor of the Potchefstroom University, a position in which he remained until 1961. During his tenure he promoted the expansion of research at the university.

He died on 17 March 1961, in Bangkok, Thailand, while on a business trip.

== Recognition ==
- Awarded an honorary doctorate by the Potchefstroom University in 1954.
- The Frans du Toit Building at Potchefstroom University was named after him and opened on 18 February 1966.
- Frans du Toit High School in Phalaborwa is named after him.
- The Frans du Toit prize awarded by Die Suid-Afrikaanse Akademie vir Wetenskap en Kuns for business leadership is named after him.
