= Johan D. van der Vyver =

- Born: Johan David van der Vyver; 21 February 1934; South Africa
- Died: 22 May 2023 (aged 89); Pretoria, South Africa
- Education: University of Pretoria, Potchefstroom University for Christian Higher Education
- Children: 4

Johan David van der Vyver (21 February 1934 – 22 May 2023) was a South African lawyer and academic who was the I.T. Cohen Professor of International Law and Human Rights at Emory University School of Law in Atlanta, Georgia.

== Life and career ==
Van der Vyver attended Potchefstroom University for Christian Higher Education, where he was classmates with F.W. de Klerk. He received a Doctor Legum, from University of Pretoria in 1974 and a Diploma of the International and Comparative Law of Human Rights of the International Institute of Human Rights in Strasbourg, France in 1986. He also had two honorary Doctor Legum degrees from the University of Zululand and the Potchefstroom University.

He was heavily involved in the promotion of human rights in South Africa, advocating for an end to apartheid, while a professor at the University of the Witwatersrand, Johannesburg.

Van der Vyver served as a fellow in the Human Rights Program at the Carter Center from 1995 to March 1998 before becoming a professor of law at Emory University School of Law.

He was a senior fellow at Emory's Center for the Study of Law and Religion.

Van der Vyver was the author of several law review articles and supplements, including Morality, Human Rights, and Foundation of the Law, International Criminal Court and the Concept of Mens Rea in International Criminal Law.

In October 2006, van der Vyver addressed the U.S. State Department on whether to make the Declaration on the Elimination of All Forms of Intolerance and of Discrimination Based on Religion or Belief a convention. He argued that the government should push for "true" international consensus, rather than a "lukewarm" convention on religious tolerance.

Van der Vyver died in Pretoria on 22 May 2023, at the age of 89.
