= Johannes Christiaan Coetzee =

Rector of the Potchefstroom University for Christian Higher Education

J Chris Coetzee

Rector of the Potchefstroom University for Christian Higher Education
- In office 1953–1964
- Preceded by: van Rooy, J.C.
- Succeeded by: Bingle, H.J.J.

Personal details
- Born: Johannes Christiaan Coetzee; March 8, 1893 Venterstad, Cape Colony
- Died: December 6, 1989 (aged 96) Pretoria, Transvaal, South Africa
- Spouse: Aletta Johanna van Rooy
- Education: Potchefstroom University for Christian Higher Education

Johannes Christiaan Coetzee was Rector of the Potchefstroom University for Christian Higher Education and an academic in education.

== Roots ==
Coetzee was born on 8 March 1893 in Venterstad, Cape Province, South Africa to Mr. Johannes Lodewicus Coetzee and Mrs. Johanna Margaretha Kruger. He married Aletta Johanna van Rooy, daughter of Antonie Charles August van Rooy and Susanna Maria Smit. He died on 6 December 1989 in Pretoria, Transvaal, South Africa.

== Education ==
He matriculated in Worcester in 1909, obtained a BSc at the Potchefstroom University for Christian Higher Education in 1912, and later earned a MA (Modern Languages), a M.Ed, and a PhD at the same university.

== Career ==
Coetzee taught mathematics and sciences from 1914 to 1917 at Steynsburg Gimnasium and the same subjects from 1917–1920 at Potchefstroom Gimnasium. In 1925, he became a professor in education at his alma mater and in 1934, Dean of the Educational Faculty.

== Rector ==
He was appointed rector of the Potchefstroom University for Christian Higher Education (now part of North-West University) in 1953. He held this position until 1964.

== Challenges and achievements during his period as rector ==
During his period as rector, he visited countries in Europe to learn how universities operated globally. He fought for Christian National Education. While serving as rector, he continued to teach advised post-graduate students in the field of education. In this period, he also wrote books on the subject of education.

== Recognition ==
In 1969, his alma mater awarded him an honorary doctorate, and a building on campus is named after him (the J Chris Coetzee building).
