= Jan de Klerk =

South African politician

Jan de Klerk DMS
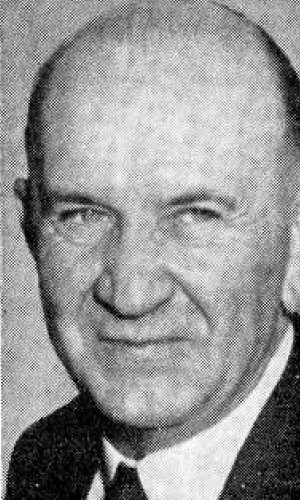
- De Klerk in 1956

State President of South Africa (acting)
- In office 9 April 1975 – 19 April 1975
- Preceded by: Jacobus Fouché
- Succeeded by: Nicolaas Diederichs

Minister of Home Affairs
- In office 8 October 1961 – 30 March 1966
- Preceded by: Tom Naudé
- Succeeded by: P. K. Le Roux

Chancellor of the Potchefstroom University for Christian Higher Education
- In office 1961–1979
- Preceded by: du Toit, F.J.
- Succeeded by: Vorster, P.W.

Personal details
- Born: 22 July 1903 Burgersdorp, Cape Colony
- Died: 24 January 1979 (aged 75) Krugersdorp, Transvaal Province, South Africa
- Party: National Party
- Spouse: Hendrina Cornelia Coetzer
- Children: Wimpie de Klerk; F. W. de Klerk
- Education: Potchefstroom University
- Religion: Reformed

Johannes "Jan" de Klerk, DMS (22 July 1903 – 24 January 1979) was a South African politician. He was the father of F. W. de Klerk, the last apartheid State President of South Africa.

As a member of the National Party, de Klerk served as interim State President for nine days following the retirement of Jacobus Johannes Fouché in 1975. Prior to this, he served as a Senator (1955–1975), Minister of Work and Public Works (1954–1958), Work and Mines (1958–1961), Home Affairs, Work and Immigration (1961), Home Affairs, Education and Arts and Sciences (1961–1966), Education, Arts and Sciences and Information (1966–1967) and National Education (1968–1969), and President of the Senate from 1969 to 1976.

== Biography ==
The eldest son of Reverend Willem de Klerk, a Dutch Reformed Church minister and his wife Aletta Johanna van Rooy, Jan de Klerk was born 22 July 1903 in Burgersdorp. He spent his childhood in Potchefstroom, in South-West Transvaal. He studied Christian Higher Education at the Potchefstroom University, where he obtained a BA degree and a higher education diploma in 1926 after three years. he was the President of the Student Union, he married Hendrina Cornelia Coetzer on 27 April 1927, and had two sons, Willem Johannes (Wimpie) and Frederik Willem (F.W.).

From 1927 to 1945, Jan de Klerk worked in Nylstroom and Witwatersrand. He was headteacher of a school, and secretary of a white workers' trade union. In January 1947, he became administrative secretary of the National Party for the Rand region and in 1948, chief secretary of the NP of Transvaal. From 1949 to 1955, he was a member of the provincial council of Transvaal.

In 1954, Jan de Klerk was named senator and Minister of Work and Public Works in the government of his brother-in-law, Prime Minister JG Strijdom. This nomination provoked controversy due to the relationship between the two men.

He was a minister in the governments of Hendrik Verwoerd and John Vorster. Until 1969, he successively dealt with mines, home affairs, immigration, and education. While Minister of Education, he helped found the Rand Afrikaans University (RAU) in Johannesburg and the University of Port Elizabeth (UPE), while also chancellor of the University of Potchefstroom (PU vir CHO). He was twice approached to be honorary president of the republic in 1967 and 1968.

In 1968, he was directly involved in the Mafeje affair as he opposed the hiring of Archie Mafeje as a senior lecturer to University of Cape Town (UCT) telling the UCT Council about the

government’s intense displeasure at the decision to appoint an African, which is tantamount to flouting the accepted traditional outlook of South Africa. Should your Council disregard my appeal and give effect to this decision, the government will not hesitate in taking such action as it may deem fit to ensure that the tradition referred to above is observed

By the time of his retirement from the cabinet, de Klerk had been a cabinet minister for more than fifteen years and was rewarded with the Decoration for Meritorious Services.

From 1969 to 1976, he presided over the Senate or upper house of the South African parliament, and this meant that he was briefly interim State President of South Africa in 1975, under a dormant commission that was invoked. He retired from political life, spent his last few years on a farm and died in Krugersdorp on 24 January 1979.

== Legacy ==
A school in Krugersdorp is named in honour of Jan de Klerk.

== Ancestry ==
Ancestors of Johannes de Klerk

16. Barend de Klerk
8. Johannes Cornelis de Klerk
17. Maria van der Heyden
4. Barend Jacobus de Klerk
18. Daniel Wilhelmus Schoeman
9. Martha Margaretha Schoeman
19. Anna Catharina Hattingh
2. Willem Johannes de Klerk
20. Douw Gerbrand Grobler
10. Jacobus Johannes Grobler
21. Johanna Cornelia Coetzer
5. Maria Jacoba Grobler
22. Josef Adriaan Coetzee
11. Johanna Susanna Lasya Coetzee
23. Francina Hendrina Barendina Kruger
1. Johannes de Klerk
24. Henricus van Rooij
12. Johannes Cornelis van Rooy
25. Clara Kuijpers
6. Johannes Cornelis van Rooy
26. Charles Holsters
13. Anne Françoise Holsters
27. Petronella de Gieter
3. Aletta Johanna van Rooy
28. Stephanus Albertus Smit
14. Jacobus Albertus Smit
29. Susanna Maria de Klerk
7. Aletta Johanna Smit
30. Jacobus Petrus Erasmus Smit
15. Aletta Johanna Smit
31. Martha Gerbrechta Sophia de Klerk

Political offices
Preceded by John Vorster	Minister of Education, Arts and Sciences; Minister of National Education; 1961–1969	Succeeded by Johannes Petrus van der Spuy
Preceded by Tom Naudé	Minister of Home Affairs; 1961–1966	Succeeded by P. K. Le Roux
Preceded by Ben Schoeman	Minister of Work; 1954–1961	Succeeded by Alfred Trollip
Preceded by Ben Schoeman	Minister of Public Works; 1954–1958	Succeeded by Paul Sauer
Preceded by Tom Naudé	President of the Senate of South Africa; 1969–1976	Succeeded by Marais Viljoen
