= Carolus Johannes Reinecke =

Rector of the Potchefstroom University for Christian Higher Education
- In office 1988–2002
- Preceded by: van der Walt, T.
- Succeeded by: Eloff, T.

Personal details
- Born: 21 December 1941 Krugersdorp, Transvaal, South Africa
- Education: Potchefstroom University for Christian Higher Education, Rijk Universiteit Leiden the Netherlands

Carolus Johannes Reinecke was the rector of the Potchefstroom University for Christian Higher Education, situated in Potchefstroom, South Africa.

== Roots ==
Reinecke was born on 21 December 1941, in Krugersdorp, South Africa. He was the son of Carolus Johannes Reinecke and Cornelia Marthina van Dyk. He passed standard 10 (grade 12) at Piet Potgieter High in Potgietersrus, Northern Transvaal. (His father was the principal) He married Hendriena Fransina Venter, daughter of Abraham Adriaan Venter and Hester Snyman.

== Education ==
He obtained the following degrees at the Potchefstroom University: BSc (Physics and Chemistry), BSc Hon (Chemistry) and a MSc (Chemistry). He then completed his PhD (in Bio-chemistry) at Leiden University, the Netherlands. He was appointed as Head of The Bio-Chemistry department of his alma mater, and in 1983 became Dean of the Natural and Agricultural Sciences Faculty of that university.

== Rector ==
After being Vice-rector from 1985 to 1988, he was appointed as rector in 1988. He was rector until 2002.

== Notable happenings during his term as rector ==
Under his leadership the university dealt with and approved:

- In 1990 the hostels were opened to all races.
- NEHAWU and MESHAWU (Metal and Electrical Workers Union of South Africa), both trade unions, were recognized.
- Madoda Shadrock Zibi, was the first black vice-rector appointed.
- In 1999 the Potchefstroom Educational College (nicknamed "POTE") was taken over by the university, a decision taken by the government of the day.
- Reinecke had a programme running with Universiteit Twente a Dutch University, regarding quality control for educational institutions. The research division: Center for Higher Education Policy Studies (CHEPS) rendered help with Potch University's education quality control.

== Publications ==
- (Afrikaans) Reaksiekinetiese ondersoek na die ontbinding van kaliumtrioksalatokobaltaat in ‘n oplossing (translated: Reaction kinetic investigation regarding the dissolution of potassium trioxalate cobaltate in a solution)
- Protein synthesis in vitro directed by bacteriophage and plant viral RNA.
