= Pieter Vorster =

South African agronomist

Chancellor of the Potchefstroom University for Christian Higher Education
- In office 1980–1981
- Preceded by: Jan de Klerk
- Succeeded by: Hendrik Johannes Jacob Bingle

Personal details
- Born: Pieter Willem; September 26, 1906 Postmasburg, Cape Colony
- Died: June 10, 2001 (aged 94) Pretoria, Gauteng, South Africa
- Spouse: Martha Sophia du Plessis
- Education: University of Stellenbosch
- Known for: Agricultural expert

Pieter Willem Vorster (16 September 1906 – 10 June 2001) was a South African agronomist and chancellor of The Potchefstroom University for Christian Higher Education.

== Beginnings ==
Pieter Willem Vorster was born on 16 September 1906 in Cape Province He was the son of Lodiwikus Francois Vorster and Magdalena Maria Snyman. He married Martha Sophia du Plessis on 16 July 1934, the daughter of Izak David du Plessis and Jacoba Helena. He died in Pretoria on 10 June 2001.

== Education ==
He completed his High School at Graaff-Reinet Volkskool. He completed his post school studies at Stellenbosch University where he obtained a B.Sc, M.Sc and PhD.

== Work ==
Vorster was a lecturer at Elsenburg Agricultural College, near Stellenbosch for 15 years. In 1945 he moved to Pretoria and started to work for the government in the vegetable seed field and in agronomy. Vorster was first an Assistant Director Research and later Secretary of the Department of Agriculture.

== Contribution to agriculture ==
He was outspoken about the influence modernisation have on the Agriculture.

He did a study on the transport of minerals like potassium through the roots of plants, to assist specific plant growers

A horticultural Institute for ornamental plant species, not picked fruit, flowers (cut) and vegetables were established in 1949 and Vorster was the first director

He helped the department of Agricultural to have a good quality standard for winter cultivars like wheat and barley

A museum was established at the Grootfontein Agricultural Institute with his help. It is situated in Middelburg, Eastern Cape, South Africa. It shows collections of farm implements used through the years. It was later named after him.

He made a contribution to the sensible usage of fertilizer

== Chancellor Potchefstroom University for Christiaan Higher Education ==
He was chancellor from 1980-1981.

== Recognition ==
The Potchefstroom University gave him an honorary shield to recognise his contribution to Agricultural affairs.
