= FW de Klerk Foundation =

- Named after: F. W. de Klerk
- Formation: 1999; 27 years ago
- Founder: F. W. de Klerk
- Type: Foundation
- Headquarters: Zeezicht Building, Tygerberg Park, 163 Uys Krige Drive, Plattekloof, Cape Town, 7500, South Africa
- Location: Cape Town, Western Cape
- Affiliations: Nonpartisan
- Website: fwdeklerk.org

The FW de Klerk Foundation is a nonpartisan organisation that was established in 1999 by former South African president Frederik Willem de Klerk.

It engages in activities related to "multi-community" countries and aims to support and nurture South Africa's democracy. The Foundation's principles are aligned with the South African constitution, multi-party democracy, and free-market economics. Its proposed objectives include supporting and promoting the constitution, fostering unity in diversity, aiding charities for disabled and disadvantaged children, and providing information on de Klerk's presidency.

Dr Theuns Eloff was the Executive Director of the Foundation from 1 July 2016. He was succeeded by the current Chairman, Dave Steward. The Foundation was involved in 2006 in the resolution of tensions concerning a directive by the Police Commissioner in the Western Cape Province that English be the sole language medium for police documentation even in primarily non-English speaking areas of the Province.

The Foundation also incorporates the Centre for Constitutional Rights (CFCR). The CFCR seeks to promote the values, rights and principles of the Constitution, to monitor developments including policy and draft legislation that might affect the Constitution and the values, rights or principles provided therein, to inform people and organisations of their constitutional rights and to assist them in claiming their rights. The CFCR is headed by Phephelaphi Dube (as of 1 May 2016) as Director of the CFCR and advised by an eminent group of constitutional experts under the patronage of the Honourable Justice Ian Farlam, retired judge of the Supreme Court of Appeal.
