= Dutch Reformed Church, Colesberg =

Church in the Northern Cape

Coordinates: 30°43′23″S 25°05′44″E

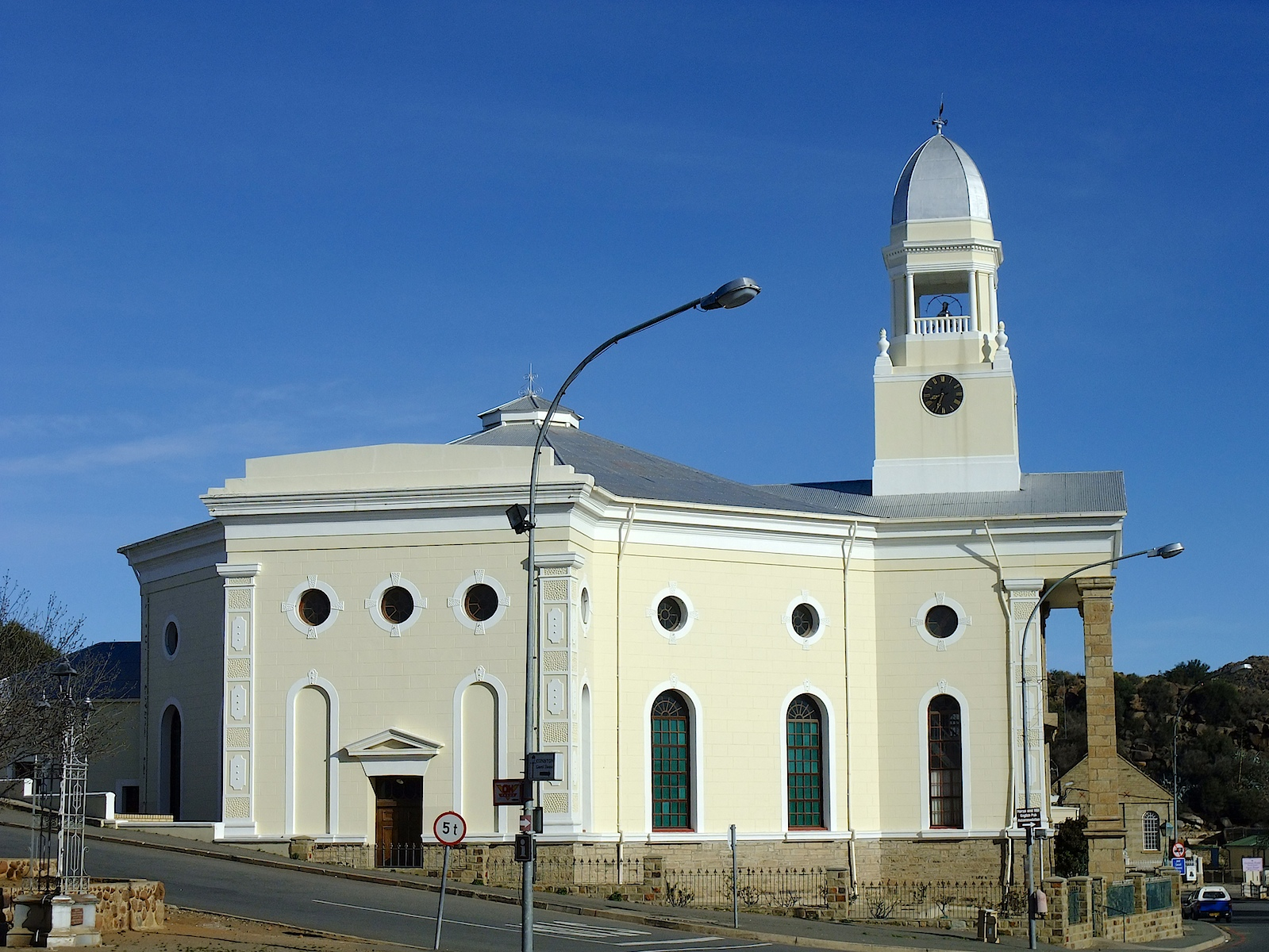

The Dutch Reformed Church in Colesberg, with the Northern Cape town of Colesberg as its centre, is the 18th oldest congregation of the Dutch Reformed Church in South Africa, but due to the synodal boundaries that differ from the provincial ones, the fifth oldest in the Synod of Eastern Cape. On 10 December 2011, the congregation was already 185 years old. In 2015, the congregation had 90 baptized and 458 professing members.

== Ministers ==
- Thomas Reid, 1836–1854 (emeritus; died on 28 February 1863)
- Servaas Hofmeyr, 1857–1860
- Anton Daniël Lückhoff, 1861–1875
- W.A. Alheit, 1875–1888
- Gustav Adolph Scholtz, 1889–1908 (emeritus; died on 16 September 1925)
- Gideon Joshua Hugo, 1909–1915
- Hendrik Adriaan Lamprecht, 1915–1928 (emeritus; died on 11 April 1932)
- Wouter Frans Van Wyk de Vos, 1929–1935
- Petrus Johannes Loots, 1935–1939
- Andries Petrus du Preez, 1939–1951 (field preacher)
- Louis Jacobus Heyns, 1940–1946
- Michiel Hendrik Visser, 1946–1953 (from 1960 to 1964 pastor of Moorreesburg)
- Frederick Johan Bessinger, 1948–1952 (possibly mission church; source unclear)
- Willem Johannes du Toit, 1954–1959 (from 1949 to 1954 pastor of Moorreesburg)
- Jan Frederik Viljoen, 1959–1965
- Willem Jacobus le Roux, 1965–1971 (from 1954 to 1959 pastor of Moorreesburg)
- Jacob Nicolaas (Japie) Taljaard, 1987–present
