= Theuns Eloff =

South African writer

Rector of Potchefstroom University for Christian Higher Education
- In office 2002–2004
- Preceded by: Reinecke C.J
- Succeeded by: University merged to form North West University

Vice-Chancellor of North-West University
- In office 2004–2014
- Preceded by: Office established
- Succeeded by: Kgwadi, N.D.

Personal details
- Born: Theuns Eloff; May 17, 1955 Potchefstroom, North- West, South Africa
- Spouse: Suzette van der Westhuizen
- Education: Potchefstroom Gimnasium, Potchefstroom University for Christian Higher Education and University of Pretoria
- Known for: Pastor, Reconciler, Vice-Chancellor and writer

Theuns Eloff (born 17 May 1955) is a South African, who is the ex-Executive Director of the FW de Klerk Foundation, an ex-Rector and an ex-Reconciler.

== Early life and education ==
He was born on 17 May 1955 in Potchefstroom. He completed his school career at Potchefstroom Gimnasium. Eloff completed his undergraduate studies in Law and Theology at Potchefstroom University for Christian Higher Education and later a PhD (Theology) at Potchefstroom University for Christian Higher Education. He was an ordained pastor in the Reformed Church of South Africa.

== Reconciler of the democratic process ==
The Dakar Conference was held on 9 to 12 July 1987 in Dakar, Senegal. It discussed strategies for bringing change in South Africa regarding: national coherence, Government structures and the economy with the African National Congress (ANC). The ANC was still banned by South African Government in 1987. Eloff was part of the Institute for Democratic Alternatives in South Africa (IDASA) delegation.

== Vice–Chancellor of the Potchefstroom University for Christian Higher Education / North-West University ==
Eloff was the Vice-Chancellor of the university from 2002 to 2014.

In 2004 the former Potchefstroom University for Christian Higher Education merged with the Mafikeng University to form the North-West University with 3 campuses, one each at Potchefstroom, Vanderbijlpark and Mafikeng (later Mahikeng). It is now called North-West University. It was Eloff who had to execute this merger. The merger was forced on Eloff by former Education Minister Kader Asmal after Eloff refused to remove the "Christian Higher Education" from the name of the Potchefstroom University. It was not initially Asmal's plan to merge the Potchefstroom University.

== The Merger Mess Controversy ==
On 12 September 2008 the newspaper Mail & Guardian reported on the "merger mess". Professor Barney Pityana, Vice-Chancellor of the University of South Africa was quoted by the Mail & Guardian to have said that at Eloff's university, "the new institution is unmanageable". A subsequent government investigation, published in 2009 in the Government Gazette, described a failed merger, in the words of Dutch academics Boersma and Wells (p. 97) "a picture of a hopelessly divided university, inhabited by both demoralized and detached students and staff, ruled by a management that is either incapable or unwilling to see this reality, and lacks the policy framework to infuse diversity into the institution as an instrument of effective transformation and equity.".

In early 2014 Eloff had to resign as Vice-Chancellor when it became apparent that a far-right fascist atmosphere reigned on campus, with students being initiated with Nazi-salutes. Photos of the Nazi-salutes, and an account of a lecturer that was victimized and pushed out of the NWU by Eloff and his managers because she dared raise questions about these far-rightwing practices, can be read on Medium.

His position, which was already precarious by 2008, had finally become untenable. Following his resignation, Higher Education Minister Blade Nzimande lashed out against Eloff, saying that Eloff was "not committed to addressing the violation of human rights at this institution”.

His successor was Professor Dan Kgwadi

== The controversy around Dan Kgwadi ==
One year after his resignation from the North-West University, Eloff was still marking the waters of the institution with criticism against his successor, Professor Dan Kgwadi. Eloff criticised Kgwadi, stating that ""Dan Kgwadi is the biggest professional disappointment of my life. It's bad to say that of your successor, but with Kgwadi I momentarily lost my judgement. I thought he was the best man to lead the North West University." It has been suggested that one reason for Eloff's cricisim against Kgwadi was because Kgwadi instituted a forensic investigation into claims that Eloff was linked to a donation of R10m to a trust that was allegedly done without permission from the university's council.

In response, a group of NWU students and workers reacted strongly, writing in an open letter that ""We are not surprised that you and other white Afrikaner neo-colonialist academics are not in favour of Prof Kgwadi’s transformational agenda and plan to deracialise Pukke."

== Executive Director FW de Klerk Foundation ==
Eloff was appointed as Executive Director of the Foundation on 1 July 2016. FW de Klerk was a former president of South Africa, a former leader of the Nationalist Party (the party who instituted the policy of Grand Apartheid), a former Chancellor of the Potchefstroom University for Christian Higher Education. He was also a Nobel Peace Prize winner. De Klerk founded the Foundation to:

- Promote the South Africa Constitution, and support the Bill of Rights. These two together with the rule of law are executed through the Centre for Constitutional Rights.
- Work to obtain unity in diversity through the Centre for Unity in Diversity.
- It also supports children with disadvantages and disabilities by means of charitable support.

== Controversy at the FW de Klerk Foundation ==
In February 2020 the FW de Klerk Foundation was widely condemned when Mr. de Klerk said in an interview with the BBC that apartheid was not a crime against humanity. In a statement defending this view, the FW de Klerk Foundation argued on 14 February 2020 that describing apartheid as a crime against humanity was simply "an agitprop project initiated by the Soviet Union". The Foundation and Mr. de Klerk later apologised after a furore broke out. Eloff stated after this that "I don't believe there will be a change in leadership at the foundation". However, Eloff resigned from the Foundation' Board of Trustees on 30 April 2020.

== Controversy over COVID-19 in South Africa ==
Eloff voiced his strong opposition against the lockdown measures instituted by the South African government in order to stem the spread of COVID-19 in the country. As reported on 22 April 2020, Eloff called on the South African government "don't extend lockdown even for another day", despite the country having one of the highest incidences of the pandemic in the world. On 16 July 2020, it was reported that Eloff tested positive for COVID-19. South Africa was one of the world's worst COVID-19 affected countries, with 796,500 confirmed cases by the first week of December 2020.

== Personal life ==
Eloff is married to Suzette van der Westhuizen. He has two daughters and three granddaughters.

== Award ==
He was awarded an Honorary Doctorate of Law, by the London South Bank University, UK in 2008.

== Book ==
He wrote a book called Wat Nou, Suid-Afrika?", later translated as Turning Point about how to create the society that we want. He based this on what he has learned through the Dakar Conference to being the Vice–Chancellor of the PUK, up to being involved in the FW de Klerk Foundation.
