= Tjaart van der Walt (academic) =

South African Bible translator and diplomat (1934–2019)

- Title: Rector of the Potchefstroom University for Christian Higher Education

Personal life
- Born: 15 February 1934 Pietersburg, Northern Transvaal, Union of South Africa
- Died: 22 February 2019 (aged 85)
- Spouse: Heiltje Johanna Gertruida Snyman
- Education: Potchefstroom University for Christian Higher Education; University of the Witwatersrand; Protestant Theological University
- Known for: Bible translation; Rector

Religious life
- Religion: Christianity

Senior posting
- Period in office: 1977–1988
- Predecessor: Hendrik Johannes Jacob Bingle
- Successor: Carolus Johannes Reinecke

Tjaart van der Walt (15 February 1934 – 22 February 2019) was the Rector of Potchefstroom University for Christian Higher Education, a Bible translator and later a diplomat.

== Personal life ==
Van der Walt was born on 15 February 1934 in Pietersburg, Northern Transvaal, South Africa. He was the son of Johannes Jacob van der Walt and Maria Jacoba de Klerk. He married Heiltje Johanna Gertruida Snyman on 30 December 1958. She was the daughter of Johannes Jurie Snyman and Maria Magdalena Venter. He went to school in Johannesburg and passed Standard 10 (Grade 12) in 1950 at Helpmekaar Boys School.

== Education ==
He obtained the degrees BA, BA (Hons) in Semitic Languages and ThB at the Potchefstroom University. He also obtained a BA (Hons) in Classical Languages at University of the Witwatersrand. He studied further at Protestant Theological University in Kampen, Overijssel, Netherlands and received a PhD from them in 1962.

== Career ==
On returning to South Africa he was a Pastor in the Reformed Church, situated in Krugersdorp. He then received a Professorship from the Potchefstroom University in New Testament Studies in 1969. From 1971 to 1973 he was the Head of the Theological Centre in Potchefstroom. He was appointed as Rector of the Potchefstroom University for Christian Higher Education on 1 May 1977 and retired on 31 December 1988. In 1983 he convinced the university's Board to allow black students at an undergraduate level. In his time as Rector the Faculty of Pharmacy and the Faculty of Engineering were established.

== Bible translation ==
He was involved in the official renewed translation of the Bible from Greek to Afrikaans.

== Other activities after being Rector ==
- Deputy Chairman of Sanlam
- President of the Council for Scientific and Industrial Research
- Chairman of FAK
- Extra ordinary professor in theology at the Mukhanyo Theological College in KwaMhlanga

== Ambassador to Bophuthatswana ==
South Africa in the era prior to 1994, when the first democratic election was held, had a "homeland" policy. One of these "homelands" or Bantustans was Bophuthatswana and Van der Walt was the last South African Ambassador to serve there. In 1994 he was appointed Administrator of the area for 6 weeks up until the election.
