= Kraaipan =

- Mahukubung
- Location within North West (South African province) Location within South Africa
- Coordinates: 26.294°S 25.297°E
- South Africa: South Africa
- Province: North West
- District: Ngaka Modiri Molema
- Municipality: Ratlou

Area
  - Total: 31.47 km^{2} (12.15 sq mi)

Population (2011)
  - Total: 9,933
  - Density: 315.6/km^{2} (817.5/sq mi)

Racial makeup (2011)
  - Black African: 99.3%
  - Coloured: 0.4%
  - Indian/Asian: 0.2%
  - Other: 0.1%

First languages (2011)
  - Tswana: 89.9%
  - Sotho: 4.0%
  - Xhosa: 2.6%
  - Other: 3.4%
- Time zone: UTC+2 (SAST)
- Postal code (street): P.O Box 63, Barolong boo Ratlou Tribal House, Letsapa Section.
- PO Box: 2747
- Area Code: 018

Kraaipan is a village in Ngaka Modiri Molema District Municipality in the North West province of South Africa.

== Location ==
The village is located between three towns, namely Vryburg (to the north west), Delareyville (to the south east) and Mahikeng (to the north east). It was formerly known as "'Mahukubung'", meaning the place of crows, which were found on a vlei or a pan by the colonizers who camped, settled, and named the place "Kraaipan" during the nights of the Anglo-Boer War initiation, they found a community of the Barolong who broke away from their Capital City of Ga-Khunwana, the council of Setlagole, an administration of Motsitlane, Ga-Thulo, Morokwa, Tlhakajeng, Mohuhuco, Motlhanaoa-pitse, Ralebelwane, Mothokaditse and other small villages. This breakup was made by Mzilikazi's war attacks, leaving the community dismantled and reintegrated later after he conquered Ga-Khunwana.

There were MaTebele who left Mzilikazi's trek and formed the society with BaRolong who remained surviving, those were the groups who were found by the first Christian missionaries who were from overseas.

Kraaipan is a host community of the Kalgold Greenstone Belt mine operated by the Harmony Mine Company. This opencast mine is situated about 15 kilometres (9.3 mi) north of the village.

== Education ==
The community has only one High School, which was built by the community themselves volunteering, that's why it is called "Boithaopo". All five primary schools were also built by the community and these were named using kings' and chiefs' names: Aron Letsapa, Chaena, Motlhabane, Ratlou and the Letsapa primary schools.
