= List of South Korea Twenty20 International cricketers =

This is a list of South Korean Twenty20 International cricketers.

In April 2018, the ICC decided to grant full Twenty20 International (T20I) status to all its members. Therefore, all Twenty20 matches played between South Korea and other ICC members after 1 January 2019 will be eligible to have T20I status.

This list comprises all members of the South Korea cricket team who have played at least one T20I match. It is initially arranged in the order in which each player won his first Twenty20 cap. Where more than one player won his first Twenty20 cap in the same match, those players are listed alphabetically by surname. South played their first matches with T20I status during the 2022–23 ICC Men's T20 World Cup East Asia-Pacific Qualifier in October 2022, in Sano.

== Key ==
General

- ‡ – Captain
- † – Wicket-keeper
- First – Year of debut
- Last – Year of latest game
- Mat – Number of matches played

Batting

- Runs – Runs scored in career
- HS – Highest score
- Avg – Runs scored per dismissal
- * – Batsman remained not out
- 50 – Number of half centuries
- 100 – Centuries scored

Bowling

- Balls – Balls bowled in career
- Wkt – Wickets taken in career
- BBI – Best bowling in an innings
- Ave – Average runs per wicket

Fielding

- Ca – Catches taken
- St – Stumpings affected

== List of players ==
Statistics are correct as of 18 May 2026.

South Korea T20I cricketers
General					Batting				Bowling				Fielding		Ref
No.	Name	First	Last	Mat	Runs	HS	Avg	50	Balls	Wkt	BBI	Ave	Ca	St	Ref
1	Aamir Lal	2022	2024	10	150	48	18.75	0	210	15	4/35	15.20	0	0	
2	Alam Nakash	2022	2024	10	76	24	7.60	0	133	6	3/28	25.83	4	0	
3	Lee Hwanhee	2022	2022	2	4	3	2.00	0	12	2	2/6	15.50	1	0	
4	An Hyobeom	2022	2024	6	9	4	3.00	0	66	4	3/8	21.75	2	0	
5	Asif Iqbal	2022	2022	3	36	21*	18.00	0	30	2	1/14	21.00	1	0	
6	Jun Hyunwoo‡	2022	2026	16	87	26	6.69	0	24	0	–	–	4	0	
7	Kim Daeyeon‡	2022	2025	17	129	29	8.06	0	150	10	3/27	20.50	7	0	
8	Kuldeep Gurjar	2022	2026	16	51	16	5.10	0	193	14	4/26	20.00	2	0	
9	Iqbal Mudassir	2022	2024	10	104	46	11.55	0	72	1	1/21	118.00	3	0	
10	Raja Shoaib†	2022	2024	10	180	40*	25.71	0	–	–	–	–	3	1	
11	Sana Ullah	2022	2022	4	0	0*	0.00	0	58	2	1/16	38.00	3	0	
12	Lee Kangmin	2022	2024	6	12	9*	6.00	0	24	0	–	–	1	0	
13	Nishat Nazmussakib†	2022	2025	10	106	31	13.25	0	8	1	1/17	17.00	0	0	
14	Soochan Park	2022	2022	2	9	9	9.00	0	–	–	–	–	1	0	
15	Balage Dilruksha‡†	2024	2026	19	392	71	21.77	2	–	–	–	–	13	7	
16	Fazil Muhammad	2024	2024	5	29	15	9.66	0	83	5	4/27	20.00	1	0	
17	Sameera Maduranga	2024	2026	20	223	51*	17.15	1	339	20	3/18	20.30	3	0	
18	Sameera Pitabeddara	2024	2026	8	2	2	0.50	0	60	1	1/34	83.00	3	0	
19	Altaf Gill	2024	2024	3	4	3	2.00	0	42	2	1/19	29.00	4	0	
20	Francois Pieters	2024	2024	1	0	0	0.00	0	–	–	–	–	0	0	
21	Kishore Babu	2025	2025	8	10	3*	5.00	0	102	4	1/9	39.25	3	0	
22	Bilal Ahmad Mir	2025	2025	8	89	24*	12.71	0	137	9	3/22	21.33	1	0	
23	Daham Madampage	2025	2026	14	126	22	9.69	0	234	10	2/21	31.00	4	0	
24	Alex Parsons	2025	2026	5	19	6	3.80	0	–	–	–	–	1	0	
25	Hyeon Parsons	2025	2026	14	191	47	15.91	0	47	7	6/31	11.57	5	0	
26	Saurabh Kumar	2025	2025	4	5	2	1.25	0	42	1	1/8	82.00	0	0	
27	Basharat Hussain	2025	2025	5	3	3	3.00	0	66	1	1/27	104.00	2	0	
28	Lee Hyosin	2025	2025	4	7	7*	7.00	0	–	–	–	–	2	0	
29	Aiden Broomfield	2026	2026	6	8	6*	8.00	0	12	1	1/8	8.00	3	0	
30	Muhammad Nadeem	2026	2026	6	57	24	19.00	0	84	5	2/13	20.00	2	0	
31	Chamith Ranasinghe	2026	2026	6	6	4*	3.00	0	78	3	1/10	34.66	1	0	
32	Sageer Ahmad	2026	2026	6	162	56	27.00	1	102	3	2/15	33.00	0	0	
