= Potchefstroom University for Christian Higher Education =

University in South Africa

- Potchefstroomse Universiteit vir Christelike Hoër Onderwys (PU vir CHO)
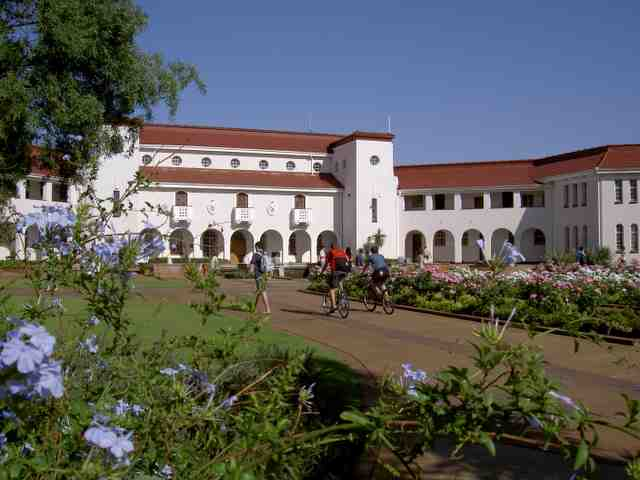
- Motto: In U lig (Afrikaans) Translated: In Thy light
- Type: Public
- Established: 29 November 1869; 156 years ago
- Chancellor: Cronje, DC in 2004- The university merged to form the North-West University in 2004
- Vice-Chancellor: Theuns Eloff in 2004 –The university merged to form the North-West University in 2004
- Students: 12000 (in 2000)
- Location: Potchefstroom, North-West, South Africa (SA)
- Colours: maroon
- Nickname: "Pukke”

The Potchefstroom University for Christian Higher Education (abbreviated as PU for CHE) was a South African university located in Potchefstroom. Instruction was mainly in Afrikaans. In 2004, the university was merged with other institutions to create the North-West University.

== History ==
=== Founded ===
Potchefstroom University developed out of the Theological School of the Reformed Churches in South Africa (Gereformeerde Kerke in Suid-Afrika in Afrikaans, abbreviated as GKSA), which was founded on 29 November 1869 in Burgersdorp, Cape Province. At the founding meeting, it was decided that education would also be offered to prospective teachers and to persons without any particular profession in mind.

=== Progression ===
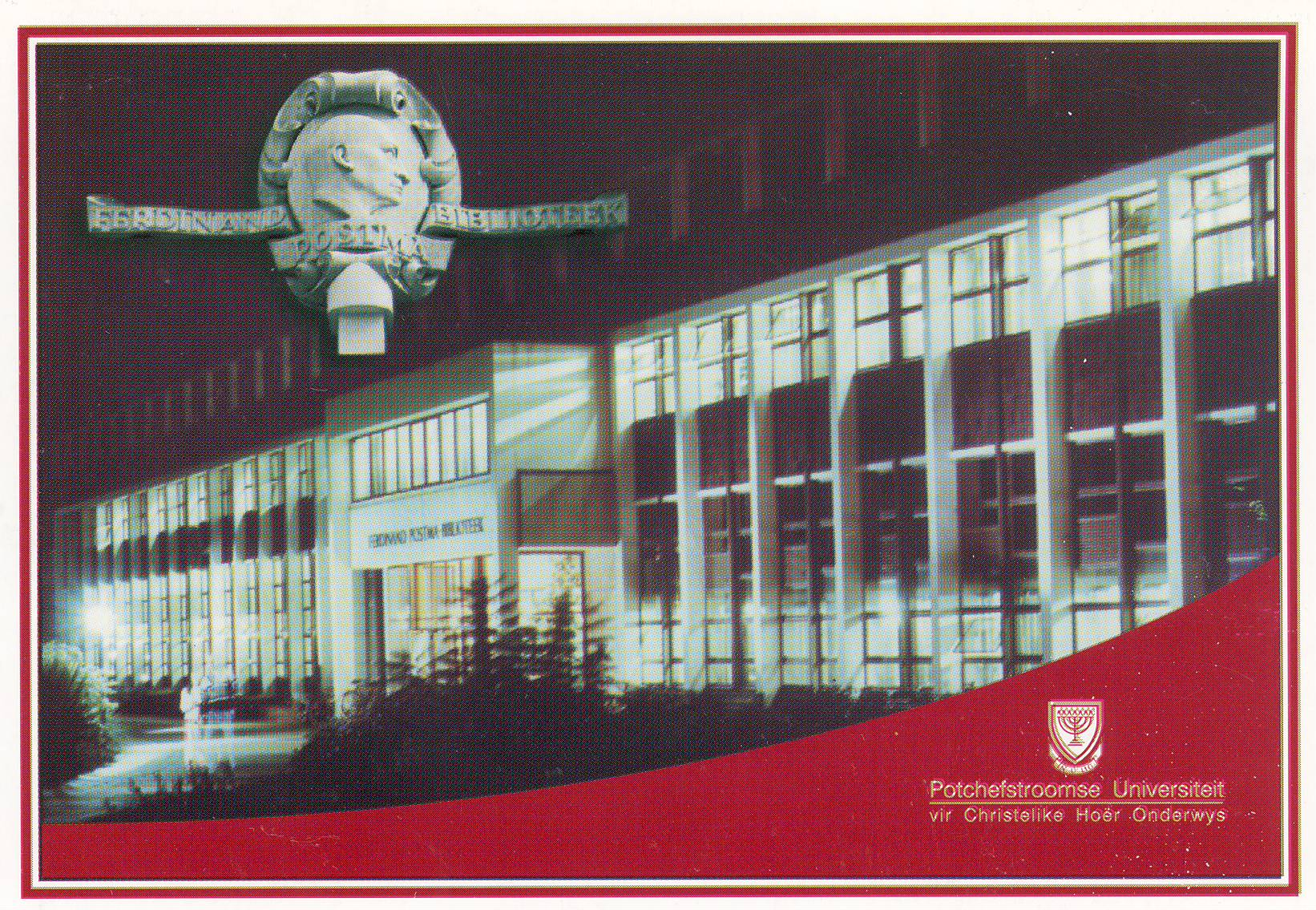
Ferdinand Postma Library of the Potchefstroom University (an old postcard)

Initially, there were only five students and two lecturers. In 1877 a "Literary Department" was established, with one professor, with the specific aim of educating students for academic degrees or as teachers. In 1905, the Theological School, including the Literary Department, was transferred from Burgersdorp to Potchefstroom in the Transvaal. In order to qualify for government subsidies, the Literary Department was separated from the Theological School in 1919 and the Potchefstroom University College for Christian Higher Education (Het Potchefstroom Universiteitskollege voor Christelijk Hooger Onderwijs in Dutch, and usually abbreviated as PUK) came into being. It was decided that the PUK would be a higher education institute separate and independent from the GKSA, although the PUK would continue to train GKSA ministers. In 1921, the Potchefstroom University College (without the "for Christian Higher Education" suffix), was incorporated into the University of South Africa; the PUK only got the "for Christian Higher Education" part of its name back in 1933.

=== Independent university ===
The Potchefstroom University College for Christian Higher Education was officially recognised as an independent university and was renamed the Potchefstroom University for Christian Higher Education in 1951.

=== Changes through the years ===
In 1993, Private Law status was established. In 1998, the statutes of the PUK were amended in order to enable her to better fulfill her role as part of the co-ordinated higher education system in South Africa according to her original mandate as an institution of Christian higher education. The Vaal Triangle Campus of the university was established in Vanderbijlpark in 1966 in order to provide that area with tertiary education. By 1996, the first online courses were offered. Students were offered interactive courses, the systematic application of multimedia. To facilitate the learning process, over 25 study centres were established country-wide. On 1 January 2000, the Potchefstroom Onderwyskollege was incorporated with the Potchefstroom University's Potchefstroom campus.

== Partnerships and research ==
- The university was on a lecturer exchange programme with The Vrije Universiteit in Amsterdam, The Netherlands
- Prior to 1994 there were only two universities in South Africa where students could obtain a Baccalaureus degree in Pharmacy. It was at Rhodes University in Grahamstown and here. These two universities did worldwide recognised research together and separately in the fields of pharmacy and chemistry.
- In 1997 George Whitefield College, became affiliated with the university.

== Name change and expanding ==
In 2004 the Potchefstroom University became one of the three campuses of the new North-West University, the others being in Mafikeng (name later changed to Mahikeng) and Vaal (situated in Vanderbijlpark). The fourth campus, Mankwe, was closed by end of 2004.

== Rector ==
Rector
Years	Surname	Name(s)	Date of birth	Date of Death
1921–1950	Postma	Ferdinand	15 July 1879	4 November 1950
1950–1953	van Rooy	Johannes Cornelis	9 July 1890	29 August 1954
1953–1964	Coetzee	Johannes Christiaan	8 March 1893	6 December 1989
1964–1977	Bingle	Hendrik Johannes Jacob	15 August 1910	29 June 2007
1977–1988	van der Walt	Tjaart	15 February 1934	22 February 2019
1988–2002	Reinecke	Carolus Johannes	21 December 1941	
2002–2004	Eloff	Theuns	15 May 1955	

== Chancellor ==
Chancellor
Years	Surname	Name(s)	Date of birth	Date of Death
1951–1953	du Toit	Jacob Daniel	21 February 1877	1 July 1953
1953–1954	van Rooy	Johannes Cornelis	9 July 1890	29 August 1954
1954–1961	du Toit	Francois Jacobus	25 August 1897	17 March 1961
1961–1979	de Klerk	Johannes	22 July 1903	24 January 1979
1980–1981	Vorster	Pieter Willem	16 September 1906	10 June 2001
1981–1991	Bingle	Hendrik Johannes Jacob	15 August 1910	29 June 2007
1992–1998	de Klerk	Frederik Willem	18 March 1936	11 November 2021
1998–2004	Cronje	Daniel Christiaan	9 September 1946	

== Notable alumni ==
=== Politics ===
- Frederik Willem de Klerk, State President of South Africa (1989–1994); Vice President of South Africa (1994–1996)
- Marike de Klerk, former first lady of South Africa and leader of the National Party's women's wing. She studied commerce at the university.
- Pieter Mulder a South African politician and former leader of the Freedom Front Plus.
- Johan Heyns an influential Afrikaner theologian and moderator of the general synod of the Nederduits Gereformeerde Kerk (NGK). He played a role in dismantling support for Apartheid in the NGK.
- Niekie van den Berg, past DA parliamentarian and an-ex radio personality.
- Dr Johan van Zyl, former CEO of Sanlam

=== Academia ===
- Tomasz Kamusella, Reader in Modern History at the University of St Andrews
- Johan D. van der Vyver, I.T. Cohen Professor of International Law at Emory University School of Law

=== Music ===
- Erica Eloff, singer.
- Rina Hugo, singer received her B.Mus. degree in 1970. She was a member of the "Alabama Studentegeselskap". She performed in all genres as soloist: Opera, Oratorium, Operetta, Musical theatre and popular Afrikaans music.
- Christa Steyn, † 11 Junie 2012 in Pretoria, also past member of "Alabama Studentegeselskap"; a composer, pianist and Afrikaans singer known for her duette with Jannie du Toit.
- Kobie van Rensburg is an international opera tenor who currently operates from Germany. He was a member of the Potchefstroom University Choir (1987–1994).
- Martin Watt a South African composer.

=== Sport ===
- Andre Markgraaff, South African rugby union lock, and controversial Springbok coach. He was also in charge of the PUK rugby Institute started in 2000.
- Henno Mentz is a former Springbok rugby player.
- Godfrey Khotso Mokoena, silver medal winner in long jump at the 2008 Beijing Olympics.
- Justine Robbeson a South African athlete who specialises in the javelin throw.

=== Business ===
- Douw Steyn (born 1952), South African billionaire businessman

=== Writers ===
- Cor Dirks, youth male writer of youth books, like "Die Uile" series
