= List of vice-chancellors and chancellors of the University of the Witwatersrand =

These are the former and current vice-chancellors and principals (positions which have been merged since 1948), and chancellors of the University of the Witwatersrand, Johannesburg.

== Vice-chancellors and principals ==
The vice-chancellor and principal is the head of the university, supported by five deputy vice-chancellors. Prior to 1948, the positions were separate, with the position of vice-chancellor being inconsequential.

=== Principals: 1922–1948 ===
- Jan Hendrik Hofmeyr: 1922–1924
- Humphrey Raikes: 1928-1948

=== Vice-chancellors and principals: 1948–present ===
- Humphrey Raikes: 1948–1953
- William G Sutton: 1954–1962
- Ian Douglas MacCrone: 1963–1968
- Guerino Renzo Bozzoli: 1968–1977
- Daniel Jacob Du Plessis: 1978–1983
- Karl Tober: 1984–1988
- Robert Charlton: 1988–1997
- Colin Bundy: 1997–2001
- Norma Ried-Birley: 2001–2003
- Loyiso Nongxa: 2003–2013
- Prof Adam Habib: 2013–2020
- Prof Zeblon Vilakazi 2021–present

== Chancellors ==
The chancellor is the titular head of the university who, in the name of the university, confers all degrees.

- Prince Arthur of Connaught: 1922–1938
- Jan Hendrik Hofmeyr: 1939–1948
- Richard Feetham: 1949–1961
- Oliver Schreiner: 1962–1974
- Bertrand Leon Bernstein: 1975–1982
- Aanon Michael Rosholt: 1982–1996
- Justice Richard Goldstone: 1996–2006
- Deputy Chief Justice Dikgang Moseneke: 2006–2018
- Dr Judy Dlamini: 2018–present

== See also ==
- List of South African university chancellors and vice-chancellors
