= Joburg Centre for Software Engineering =

Tech hub in Braamfontein

Coordinates: 26°11′39″S 28°02′02″E

The Joburg Centre for Software Engineering (JCSE) is an official Centre at based at the University of the Witwatersrand (Wits University), Johannesburg. The JCSE was established in 2005 as a partnership between academia, government, and industry to promote skills development, research, innovation, and best practices in software engineering, software development, and related ICT fields. This partnership between three major sectors, the City of Johannesburg, the University of the Witwatersrand and ICT and financial services was supposed to lead to a growing infrastructure base, better governance and investments in Gauteng.

The JCSE initiated a digital innovation hub known as Wits University’s Tshimologong Digital Innovation Precinct. This precinct was launched in 2016, with the intention of reaching greater heights of industrialisation. A year later, the 2017 Tshimologong Precinct was spun off by Adam Habib as The Wits Incubator (Pty) Ltd company (Tshimologong).
