= Universities South Africa =

Organization representing universities

- Formation: 22 July 2015
- Type: Association of Universities
- Location: Pretoria, South Africa
- Members: 26
- Chief Executive Officer: Phethiwe Matutu
- Website: www.usaf.ac.za

Universities South Africa (USAf), formerly known as Higher Education South Africa (HESA), is an intermediary that represents all 26 public universities leaders to the general public and acts in the “best interests” of universities.

== Background to USAF ==
Previously known as Higher Education South Africa (HESA), formed on 9 May 2005 as a successor to the two statutory representative organisations for universities and technikons, the South African Universities Vice-Chancellors Association (SAUVCA) and the Committee of Technikon Principals (CTP).

- SAUVCA was an aspirational framework for the transformation and restructuring of South African higher education. It was established as a statutory body for the 21 public universities in South Africa by the Universities Act (Act 61 of 1955). As a statutory body, it made recommendations to the Minister and Director-General of Education on matters referred to or any other issues deemed necessary for universities.
- The CTP was a national higher education association established in 1967 regarding the Advanced Technical Education Act (No. 40 of 1967). It consisted of the rectors, principals and [Chancellor (education)|Vice-Chancellors] of technikons in South Africa.

HESA's focus was on policy analysis and strategic research, advocacy and stakeholder influence and sector support. HESA was critical of budgetary declines for education that began in 2004 HESA was also critical of the Higher Education and Training Laws Amendment Bill (2012) which had implications for institutional autonomy and academic freedom. and was passed without adequate consultation.

== Rebranding ==
Restructuring of the higher education sector, resulted in the establishment of new institutional types and a need for a robust and unified body of leadership was identified. Higher Education South Africa (HESA) changed its name to Universities South Africa (USAf) on 22 July 2015, under the leadership of Adam Habib. USAf offered an alternative discussion fora for its members to debate, link to best practices and collaborate. The organisation frequently used the rhetoric of transformation to describe the changes they envisage for the South African Higher Education sector.

The USAf board is made up of 26 Vice-Chancellors drawn from member universities, and positions the organization as “a thought leader” and "The Voice of South African Universities". Their members endorse a comprehensive and equitable national higher education system that is responsive to the many challenges facing the country. Through a mixture of lobbying, advocacy and activism, USAf attempts to facilitate an optimal environment, conducive for universities to function effectually and maximally contribute to the social, cultural, and economic advancement of South Africa and its people.

USAf are only accountable to their members, who play a large role in "governance structures, strategy determination, and operational planning". Since good governance in public Higher Education has also been flagged as a widespread HE challenge, there may be a need for USAf to go beyond thought and voice and take measures to protect all staff and students in universities against power imbalances. This has begun, and USAf has taken some steps to make whistleblowing a part of the "ethical infrastructure" but the ongoing lack of external accountability has also resulted in accusations of "privilege gatekeeping", and possibility of elite capture.

USAf represents all 26 public universities and universities of technology in South Africa and is a Section 21 company.

== Programmes ==
The Higher Education Leadership and Management Programme (HELM) was founded in 2002. HELM is one of the flagship programmes, offered by USAf. This programme offers contextual and bespoke leadership and management programmes for emerging, middle and senior managers and leaders in universities. HELM is intended for both individuals and institutions. It is used to "identify their capacitation needs within their specific contexts and align individual leadership development pathways with their organisational objectives". HELM's purpose is intended to develop effective leaders in higher education, thus contributing to student success.

The Entrepreneurial Development in Higher Education (EDHE) is the USAf's second flagship programme. The EDHE platform was set up in 2016, and is intended for entrepreneurial development across the university sector. EDHE is essentially a response to graduate and youth unemployment and the diminishing resources available at universities.

Additional USAf Programme

- Students need to meet the requirements for Matriculation Exemption to be accepted to universities. The Universities South Africa Matriculation Board offers advice.
- The university sector is underfunded. USAf uses Higher Education Price Index (HEPI) when negotiating subsidy increases with the government. HEPI measures the inflation rate for higher education by considering universities' typical spending patterns. HEPI plays a crucial role in ensuring the affordability and accessibility of higher education, an essential aspect of their commitment to fairness and equality.
- Advancing Early Career Researchers and Scholars (AECRS) is an attempt by USAf, to build capacity, offer support and enrich careers through collaboration and partnerships in the South African higher education and research sector. ACERS manages two platforms. Thuso Resources, a national toolbox for emerging scholars” and Thuso Connect, a mentorship platform.

== Members and Platforms ==
Higher Education Provision
Institution Name	LMS Name	Platform Provider	Name	OPM Contract
Cape Peninsula University of Technology	My Classroom	Blackboard		
Central University of Technology	eThuto	Blackboard	Distance Learning	HEPSA
Durban University of Technology	Think Learn Zone	Moodle	ODL	HEP-A
Mangosuthu University of Technology	MUT e-learn	Blackboard		
Nelson Mandela University	iLearn	Moodle	Virtual Academy	HEP (or Hep Africa)
North-West University	eFundi	Sakai		
Rhodes University	RU Connected	Moodle		
Sefako Makgatho Health Sciences University	iThute	Blackboard		
Sol Plaatje University	Learn	Moodle		
Stellenbosch University	SUN Learn	Moodle		
Tshwane University of Technology	myTUTor	D2L Brightspace	?	Hepafrica
University of South Africa	My UNISA	Moodle (mobile)		
University of the Free State	Learn	Blackboard	Ideas Lab	HEPSA Contact ended
University of Cape Town	Amathuba	D2L Brightspace		
University of Fort Hare	Learn @ UFH	Blackboard		
University of Johannesburg	ULink	Moodle	Online	Higher Ed Partners SA or HEPA
University of KwaZulu-Natal	Learn2025	Moodle		
University of Limpopo	TM learn	Blackboard		
University of Mpumalanga	My UMP	Moodle		
University of Pretoria	ClickUp	Blackboard	Online & COES	HEPSA
University of the Western Cape	iKamva	Sakai	CIECT	HEPSA
University of the Witwatersrand	Ulwazi	Canvas	Online CLTD	AP (contract end)
University of Venda	My Univen	Moodle		
University of Zululand	Learn	Moodle		
Vaal University of Technology	MoodleVUT	Moodle		
Walter Sisulu University	Wise Up	Moodle		

== Undoing the legacies from the past ==
Transformation of higher education is a complex matter, and university leaders have inherited many of Apartheid's unequal legacies. VCs are also facing competing agendas, such as the need to address research productivity, the imperative to widen access and success to more and the pressure to remain globally competitive

Locations of the public universities in South Africa

Policy and legislation has enabled change in South African higher education. The landscape has shifted, from an unequal, fragmented, racialized system to a system that supports access, success and equity. Institutions and individual university leaders and management teams have taken disparate approaches to "transformation", but a compliance-driven approach, has had limited success. Student's "throughput, pass and dropout rates ...remain racialised and gendered". Universities transformation efforts are "agonisingly slow".

Clearly, higher education has to consider alternative approaches to teaching and learning. With a national unemployment rate of 32% in the first quarter of 2024. There's an obvious mismatch between the labour market demands, what students are being taught, and the qualifications they receive. In the absence of formal work opportunities, the imperative to drive student and graduate entrepreneurship is urgent and necessary.

Online platforms have also been positioned as a mechanism for transformation, to improve access and improving success rates. When the national educational shutdown was announced, due to COVID-19 in March 2020, the “digital transformation” that accompanied the pandemic, and the countrywide instruction to “pivot” to emergency remote teaching, had a disproportionate negative effect on disadvantaged students and "exacerbated historic inequalities" among those who did have adequate access to computing resources or bandwidth / data to connect to their institutions while learning off campus. Venture capital (and not vice chancellors) sold many "wholesale solutions", to serve the 4IR, instead of addressing the immediate needs of students and academics. With hindsight, it became clear that technology, by itself, does not transform higher educational institutions. Platforms (LMS, CRM, SIMS) fit in this "hugely complex, reclusively intertwined technology web" and compete with individual institutional factors (e.g. shrinking budgets, procurement staff, technology acceptance, policy mandates etc) which also hinder the re- shaping of higher education.

USAF have also worked in partnership with the Central Applications Office (CAO), a KwaZulu-Natal non-profit organisation that offers advice and support and simplifies the process of making applications to public and private higher education institutions in KZN.

=== Research productivity ===
Coherence in the National System of Innovation (NSI) needs to be addressed as it is more a policy wish than a reality. A review by the Higher Education, Science, Technology and Innovation Institutional Landscape (HESTILL), chaired by Ihron Rensburg, also found that the NSI had avoided coordination and greater planning and coherence was necessary.

=== Access and NSFAS ===
Policy changes within the National Student Financial Aid Scheme (NSFAS) have created risks and challenges for universities. USAf has highlighted risks of bad debt. 2023 marked a seminal point in state spending patterns. DHET allocated more money to NSFAS than universities for the first time. The non-payment of NSFAS funds in 2024 have created new challenges for universities. While South Africa is funding students' access to higher education through NSFAS, there hasn't been a visible improvement in stability within Higher Education and are still battling to function effectively In February 2024, the Special Investigation Unit (SIU) announced that they had made a recovery totalling of R737 926 351 from institutions of Higher Learning.

=== University Rankings ===
The Council for Higher Education (CHE) has recently raised important questions about university rankings. A critical opinion, has been published on the rankings industry. The piece argues that rankings are both an example of neocolonialism and neoliberalism. Certain members of USAf believe that higher education is a market, instead of a collective endeavour . Many USAf member's press releases that mention their university rankings. Despite knowing that university rankings are biased and methodologically flawed, have short-term publicity gains and are acknowledged as an unscientific "game", this practice continues.

== USAf and addressing corruption ==
Educational fraud, contact cheating and unethical behaviour within academia is a global challenge that faces all higher education systems worldwide Published research has highlighted that "a culture of corruption is rampant” in certain South African universities, with the DBE making allegations of embargoed matric marks being leaked prematurely by “USAf or a higher educational institution” over a number of years. Despite policies, systems or structures, weakened university systems allow and enable fraudsters to access funds through corrupt means". Academic dishonesty among students is a concern and whistleblowing among students in one institution has been researched USAf have also explored the complexities of ethical research and whistleblowing.

The topic of graft in Higher Education was recently made visible in a popular book entitled "Corrupted: A Study of Chronic Dysfunction in South African Universities”, by Jonathan Jansen, a former VC of the University of the Free State. The book examines the root causes of corruption in South African Higher Education, and counts at least 20 interventions by the South African government into 15 of the country's 26 public universities since 1994.

Whistleblowing has recently become a more common mechanism to report corruption, as seen under the Zondo Commission. Under law, whistleblowers should be able to make safe and protected disclosures. USAf has placed a "Fraud Hotline (free call)" on their webpage. USAf have also published a directory of fraud hotlines where suspected fraud can be reported to the concerned institution's hotline. Here, the reporting policies of institutions are also mentioned. Good Governance for HEIs requires modern, transparent, and accountable governance arrangements.

In practice, whistleblowers often do not receive protection and many face harassment and persecution. Internal whistleblowing hotlines are common on university campus, but these channels are also fraught with "complexity and contradiction". Neither do all the 26 members of USAf have whistleblowing policies or reporting numbers on listed on the USAf directory of fraud hotlines. While there has been progress made on a commitment to addressing graft, reports have also indicated that "anti-corruption procedures and tools deployed across the system varied widely; were not consistently applied; and were not always that effective." Neither are whistleblowers welcome, and not seen as the “truth-tellers”. Rather, they are “blackballed” and excluded. Seen as individuals who cannot be trusted.

== Enquiry into VC remuneration ==
MP's have been advocating for an investigation into salaries of vice-chancellors and senior managers at universities since 2019. The Minister of Education wrote to the Council on Higher Education (CHE) requesting that they research the matter. In the CHE-led probe entitled an "Inquiry into the Remuneration of University Vice-Chancellors and Senior Executive Managers in South Africa", many serious issues about governance were highlighted. According to the terms of reference, the CHE inquiry into remuneration was supposed to be completed by March 2021. The final inquiry to parliament was delivered on the 21 Feb 2024, three years later than promised. Ongoing salary increases in higher education have been compared to a runaway train. Among many issues raised, poor institutional governance and management and lax financial practices were highlighted. This salary disparity has been dragging on for almost a decade. Excessive VC remuneration rates have been highlighted repeatedly in the news. From 2005 to 2019, VC salaries grew by 239%. This has contributed to an increasingly casual or temporary higher education workforce. It appears that institutional autonomy and academic freedom has led to 57% of staff in public universities employed either on a short term or temporary contract.

The DHET has also committed itself to establishing an ombuds system, to resolve ongoing issues within tertiary education. USAf has stated its support for the inquiry and intends to regain the public's trust in its financial management. Fair and equitable vice-chancellor remuneration can be set with norms and standards. However, until substantive issues are addressed directly, history has shown that these self-serving patterns in universities will, in all probability, linger.

== Academic Leadership and Integrity ==
Higher Education can serve the public good, contribute to the commons, re-imagine a new society and level the playing field and reduce and differential graduation rates based on race, gender, class and other critical variables. USAf has committed itself to offering “an optimal environment conducive for universities to function effectively”. In their strategic plans, they have also realized that they cannot achieve this by themselves and are looking for appropriate alliances and strategic and operational partners.

While alliances and partnerships may "provide a few keys to unlocking otherwise seemingly impossible problems and challenges" facing HE. Outsourcing or privatization can lead to the enclosure and reinforces digital capitalism's hegemony. Power imbalances have a variety of unintended effects and can limit institutions, staff and students. If higher education is to be transformed, then academic integrity has to be institutionalized. The state of governance must be strengthened with policies and reporting systems. The Future Professors programme, suggested by Jonathen Jansen, is an example of such an initiative. This two year national and collaborative programme is intended to build leadership and governance capacity among researchers in a shorter space of time than would have been the case without this intervention.

Whistleblowers also need to be properly protected so they can assist with rooting out corruption. Their enablement, protection and the subsequent correction of problematic practices, are a priority if the problems and challenges facing the sector are to be addressed. The scourge of corruption in many university chambers is an established problem, and USAf members need to also be accountable to the general public about their activities and not cover up "leadership failures". Otherwise, transformation will remain "empty rhetoric".

HESA / USAf have published their annual reports from 2010 up until 2023. These annual reports show that Leadership in higher education is fraught with challenges. In the context of “disruption, complexity, change, and in the global pursuit of the Engaged University”, VCs with integrity have to be proactive, transparent, reach out and listen instead of silencing its critical voices If USAf members can return to scrutinizing their own practices as drivers of privilege gaps and address factors that they can control, then the change that higher education seeks to enable, might be possible.
