= Mary Vilakazi =

South African businesswoman (born 1977)

- Born: Mary Seemane; August 1977 (age 49); Alexandra, South Africa
- Citizenship: South Africa
- Education: University of the Witwatersrand
- Spouse: Zeblon Vilakazi

Mary Vilakazi (née Seemane; born August 1977) is a South African businesswoman and chartered accountant who has been chief executive officer of FirstRand since April 2024. Before joining FirstRand as chief operating officer in 2018, she was deputy chief executive officer at MMI Holdings and a partner at PwC.

== Early life and education ==
Vilakazi was born in August 1977. She was born and raised in Alexandra, a township outside Johannesburg. Her mother was a bookkeeper. She attended primary school in Alexandra, but, supported by a Rotary Fund scholarship, she matriculated at St Enda's Secondary School in Braamfontein, Johannesburg. She fell pregnant and gave birth during her final year of high school but nonetheless enrolled at the University of the Witwatersrand, where she completed a Bachelor of Commerce in 1999 and Honours in 2000.

== Career ==
Vilakazi completed her articles of clerkship as a chartered accountant at auditing firm PwC, which had given her a bursary to complete her degree. During her articles, though initially interested in banking, she developed a specialism in the insurance industry. She became a chartered accountant in 2002. She remained at PwC thereafter and in 2005, aged 27, was promoted to partner in its Cape Town office.

Between 2008 and 2011, she was chief financial officer of the Mineral Services Group, a mining services consultancy; she later said that she took the job in order to have more time with her eldest daughter, who was entering high school, and in order to work in an environment that was less corporate and more entrepreneurial. She left the group in 2011 to become a consultant but remained on its board and consulted for it two days a week.

In May 2014, Vilakazi returned to Johannesburg to join MMI Holdings, a JSE-listed financial services group which had been her client at PwC and whose board she had joined in 2010. She was hired as head of balance sheet management, on the understanding that she would be considered for promotion to chief financial officer, and she became chief financial officer in July 2015. During this period she was closely involved in implementing the merger between Metropolitan Holdings and Momentum Group. She was appointed as MMI's deputy chief executive officer in July 2017 and in subsequent months was considered as a candidate to succeed Nicolaas Kruger as chief executive officer; however, in February 2018, MMI announced that Kruger would be succeeded by an external candidate and that Jeanette Marais would be appointed as a second deputy chief executive to work alongside Vilakazi.

Later in 2018, Vilakazi left MMI to join FirstRand as chief operating officer. On 4 October 2023, FirstRand announced that she would replace Alan Pullinger as chief executive officer. She took up her new position on 1 April 2024. She was FirstRand's first woman CEO, its second black CEO after Sizwe Nxasana, and the first woman to lead a major South African bank since Maria Ramos's departure from Absa.

== Honours and awards ==
In 2016, Vilakazi was named as one of the World Economic Forum's Young Global Leaders. For her leadership in the South African financial services sector, she received the Greg Boyd Award at the 2024 Association of Black Securities and Investment Professionals Awards.

== Personal life ==
She is married to Zeblon Vilakazi, an academic whom she met at Witwatersrand University as a student and who became vice chancellor of the university in 2021. They have three children. Her eldest daughter, Kamogelo, died in a car accident in 2015, aged 20.
