= Zeblon Vilakazi =

Vice-Chancellor and Principal of the University of Witwatersrand

Zeblon Zenzele Vilakazi

Vice-Chancellor and Principal of University of the Witwatersrand
- In office 1 January 2021 – present
- Chancellor: Judy Dlamini
- Preceded by: Adam Habib

Personal details
- Born: 3 April 1969 (age 57) Katlehong, Ekurhuleni, Gauteng, South Africa
- Spouse: Mary Vilakazi
- Education: European Centre for Nuclear Research (PhD) University of the Witwatersrand (MSc) University of Manchester (BSc)
- Profession: Physicist; University administrator
- Scientific career
- Workplaces: University of Cape Town; iThemba LABS; University of Witwatersrand

Professor Zeblon Zenzele Vilakazi FRS (born 3 April 1969) is a South African nuclear physicist and university administrator currently serving as vice-chancellor and principal of Wits University in Johannesburg, South Africa. Prior to his promotion, he was vice-principal and deputy vice-chancellor for research and postgraduate studies.

Vilakazi speaks French, German, Russian, Xhosa, Zulu, Siswati (mother tongue), Sesotho, Afrikaans and English.

== Early life and education ==
Vilakazi was born in Katlehong, Ekurhuleni, as the youngest of a family of eight. His mother was a housewife, and his father ran a small shop in the community.

He was one of the first students from Africa to conduct PhD research at the European Centre for Nuclear Research (CERN) in Geneva, Switzerland. This was followed by a National Research Foundation postdoctoral fellowship at CERN.

== Career ==
After conducting his doctoral research at the European Centre for Nuclear Research (CERN) in Geneva, Switzerland, he returned to South Africa and became a lecturer at the University of Cape Town, where he was instrumental in establishing South Africa’s first experimental high-energy physics research group focusing on the development of the High-level Trigger for the CERN-ALICE experiment at the Large Hadron Collider.

Vilakazi joined the University of the Witwatersrand in January 2014 as the deputy vice-chancellor: research and postgraduate affairs and was promoted to the position of vice-principal in April 2020. He was appointed vice chancellor and principal of Wits University in 2021, and his appointment was renewed for a second and final five-year term starting January 2026.

He is a Fellow of the African Academy of Sciences. He was elected a Fellow of the Royal Society (FRS) in May 2022.
