= Nxasana =

Nxasana is a South African surname. Notable people with the surname include:

- Mxolisi Nxasana (fl. 1994–2017), Director of Public Prosecutions in South Africa
- Sizwe Nxasana (born 1957), South African businessman
