= Loyiso Nongxa =

South African mathematician

Former Vice-Chancellor of the University of the Witwatersrand
- In office 19 May 2003 – 1 June 2013
- Preceded by: Norma Reid Birley
- Succeeded by: Adam Habib

Personal details
- Born: 22 October 1953 (age 72) Indwe, Eastern Cape, South Africa
- Education: University of Fort Hare, Oxford University
- Profession: Mathematician

Loyiso Nongxa is a South African mathematician, the current chairperson of the National Research Foundation of South Africa (NRF) and a former Vice-Chancellor and Principal of the University of the Witwatersrand, Johannesburg (Wits).

== Early life and education ==
Nongxa was born on 22 October 1953 in Mhlanga near Lady Frere, Eastern Cape in what was then the Transkei. Both of his parents were qualified teachers, and his father was a school principal, although his mother remained at home to raise the family. Nongxa did well at school, and matriculated from Healdtown College with distinction as the top matric student in South Africa in 1972. Nongxa was accepted at the University of Fort Hare (UFH) thereafter, and obtained a BSc (Hons) in 1976. While at UFH, he also played for the university's "Baa-bas" rugby team. After obtaining a MSc from UFH in 1978, he became South Africa's first Black Rhodes scholar, and he obtained a D.Phil from Oxford University in 1982, where he holds the title of Honorary Fellow (Balliol College).

== Academic career ==
Nongxa has lectured mathematics at UFH, the National University of Lesotho, the University of Natal and the University of the Western Cape (UWC). At UWC, he held the post of Professor of Mathematics, and he was later appointed dean of the Faculty of Natural Sciences. He had also been a visiting research scholar at the universities of Colorado, Harvard, Connecticut, Hawaii, and Baylor.

He was appointed deputy vice-chancellor for Research at Wits in October 2000, and Vice-Principal in April 2002. Following the resignation of Professor Norma Reid Birley in November 2002, he became Acting Vice-Chancellor and principal of the university. The University Council then shortlisted him as one of the possible candidates for the position of vice-chancellor, and on 19 May 2003 he was appointed vice-chancellor by the council. Nongxa was the first black vice-chancellor of Wits. He was succeeded as vice-chancellor by Adam Habib on 1 June 2013.

Besides his positions at universities, Nongxa has also served as a member of the Rhodes Scholarship Selection Committee, the SAUVCA Research Committee and various National Research Foundation of South Africa committees. Since leaving Wits, he has taken up to post of chairperson of the NRF.

Nongxa was elected vice-president of the International Mathematical Union in July 2018.

Academic offices
Preceded by Norma Ried-Birley	Vice-Chancellor of the University of the Witwatersrand; 2003 — 2013	Succeeded by Adam Habib
