= Campuses of the University of the Witwatersrand =

University buildings and infrastructure in Johannesburg

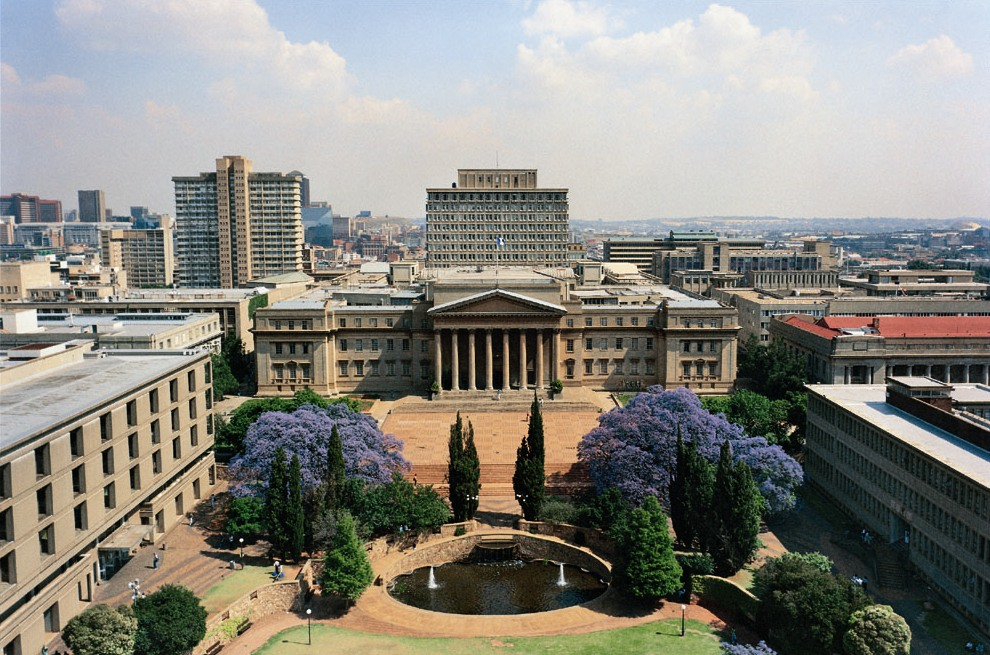
An aerial view of East Campus from the north of the campus.

The campuses of the University of the Witwatersrand, Johannesburg contain a number of notable buildings. There are five campuses: East Campus and West Campus are located in Braamfontein on opposite sides of the M1 highway, connected by a bridge crossing over the highway and a tunnel crossing underneath, while the Education Campus and the Medical and Management schools are located in Parktown.

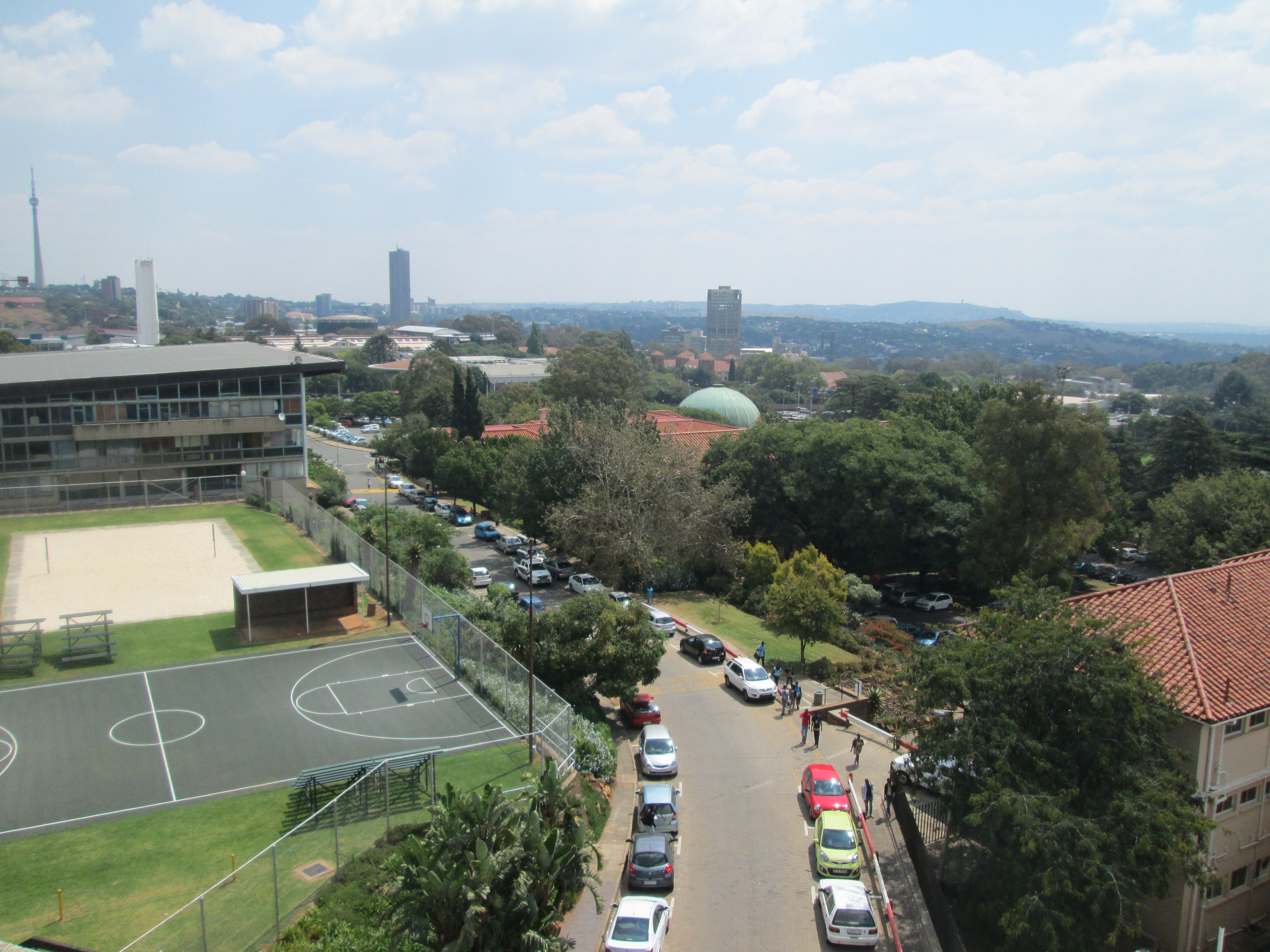
The north-west of East Campus as viewed from the balcony of the Student Union Building, adjoining the SRC offices.

== East Campus ==
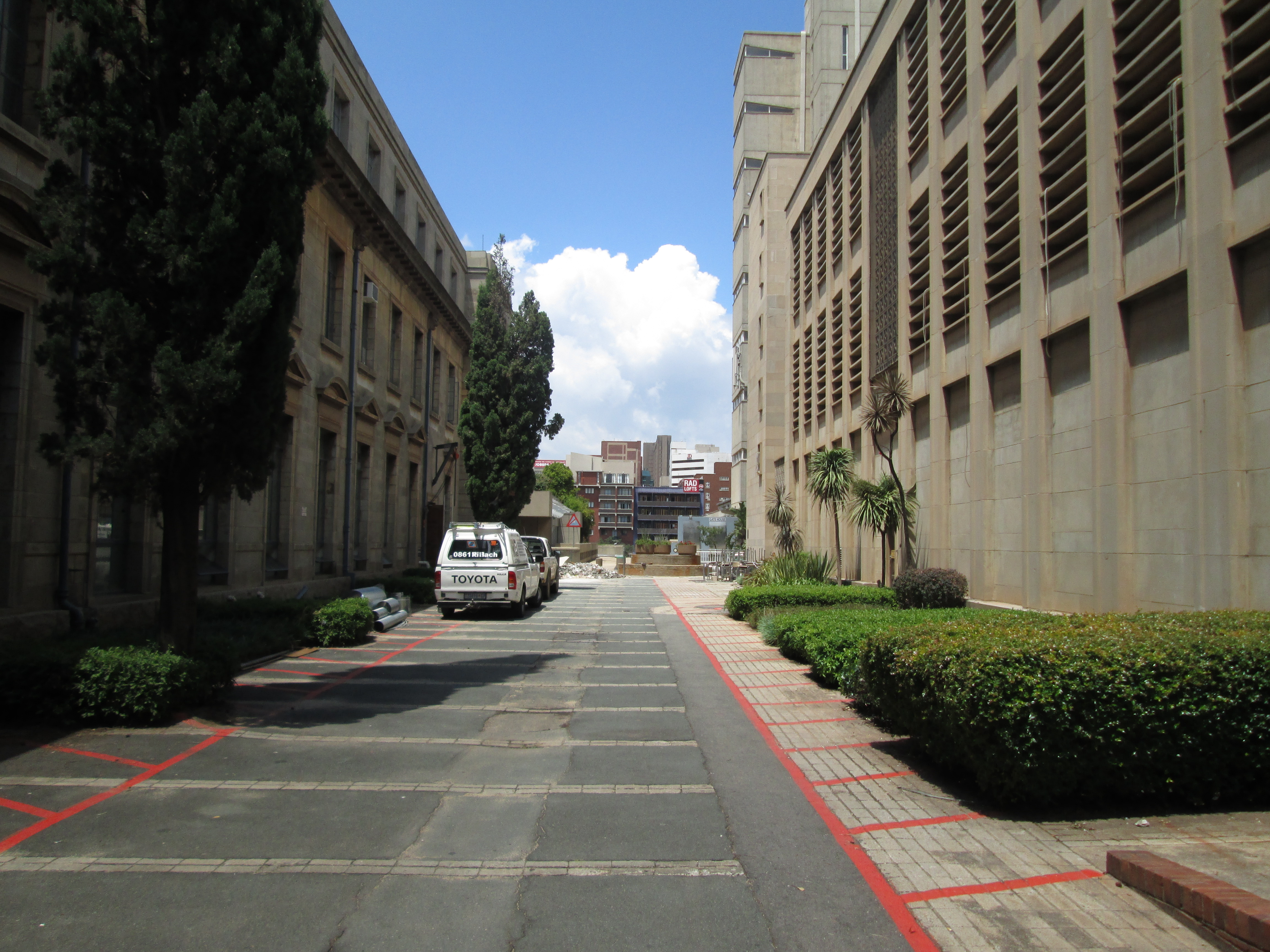
East Campus is home to most of the more historic buildings at Wits.

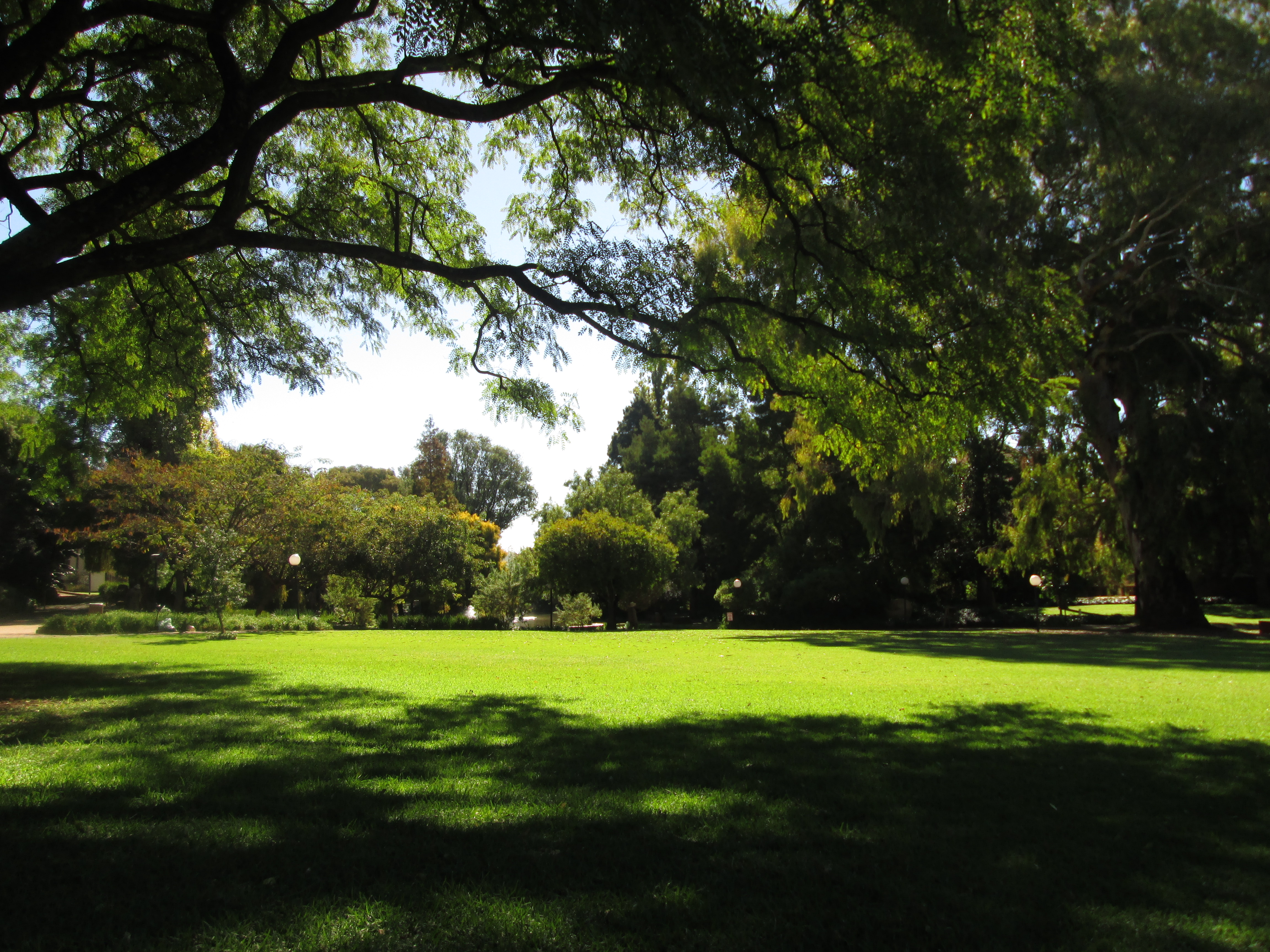
The Gavin Reilly Green on West Campus.

When, in 1922, the University College, Johannesburg was granted full University status as the University of the Witwatersrand, a site in Milner Park in Braamfontein was donated to the new university by the Johannesburg municipality. That site is today East Campus.

East Campus is the home of the faculties of Humanities and Science. As the oldest of the university's five campuses, it contains many of the university's most notable buildings and locations; chief among these is the iconic Great Hall, the location of the university's graduation ceremonies and a national monument. Construction of the Great Hall, and the rest of Robert Sobukwe Block, the building in which it is located, began on 4 October 1922 when the university was inaugurated. The foundation stones of the building (one in English and the other in Dutch) were laid by Prince Arthur of Connaught, then the Governor-General of the Union of South Africa, and also the university's first chancellor. In 1925, Edward the Prince of Wales opened Central Block (as Robert Sobukwe Block was then called).

Just south of Robert Sobukwe Block is Solomon Mahlangu House, the tallest building on campus. Construction of Solomon Mahlangu House (formerly Senate House) was completed in 1977, and it has since become strongly identified with University management, located on the eleventh floor of the building. "The eleventh floor" has become a metonym on campus for University management. Solomon Mahlangu House is the location of meetings of the university's senate, as well as the university council. East Campus is also the location of Jan Smuts House, home of the South African Institute of International Affairs, as well as Bidvest Stadium, the home stadium of Wits University F.C.

The campus itself is centred on the Library Lawns, to the north of the Great Hall. The Wartenweiler and William Cullen Libraries are located on each side of the Library Lawns. To the north-east of the Library Lawns is the Student Union Building, home of the Matrix Student Mall (from which the building's colloquial name, "The Matrix", derives), opened in 2003, as well as the Student Representative Council (SRC) and many of the university's student clubs, societies and organisations. The Origins Centre, a museum that houses archaeological exhibits relating to the evolution of humans, as well as the Bernard Price Institute for Palaeontological Research are also located on East Campus.

There are four student residences on East Campus: Men's Hall of Residence, colloquially known as Men's Res, for male students, as well as the Sunnyside Hall of Residence, and Jubilee Hall, for female students. The fourth, International House, is a self-catering residence for foreign students.

== West Campus ==
West Campus Village, a residence on West Campus.

Prior to 1985, what is now West Campus was the Rand Show fairgrounds. In 1985 the university underwent significant expansion and acquired the grounds from the Witwatersrand Agricultural Society. Today, West Campus is home to the faculties of Engineering and the Built Environment and Commerce, Law and Management.

The staff club and a tower housing, a tuck shop and the security office were originally constructed for the Empire Exhibition, South Africa.

There are three residences on West Campus, all mixed-gender. They are the self-catering Barnato Hall, the catering David Webster Hall, and the self-catering West Campus Village.

== Parktown Campuses ==
The Medical and Management schools and Education Campus are located in Parktown. The Medical School, home of the Faculty of Health Sciences is adjacent to the Charlotte Maxeke Johannesburg Academic Hospital. Education Campus, home to the School of Education (part of the Faculty of Humanities), was formerly the Johannesburg College of Education, prior to the 2005 merger of that institution into the University of the Witwatersrand.

== See also ==
- Origins Museum
