= Jeanette Marais =

South African businesswoman

- Born: Jeanette Christina Marais; 1967 or 1968 (age 57–58); Free State, South Africa
- Education: University of the Free State

Jeanette Christina Marais-Cilliers (née Marais; born 1967 or 1968) is a South African businesswoman who has been chief executive officer of the Momentum Group since August 2023. She formerly held executive positions at Stanlib, Old Mutual, and Allan Gray.

== Early life and education ==
The eldest of five siblings, Marais was born in 1967 or 1968. Her father and grandfather were Afrikaans-speaking farmers, and she grew up on the family farm near Reddersburg in the southern Free State. She completed a Bachelor of Science in mathematics and statistics at the University of the Free State. Later in her career, she completed a part-time Master of Business Administration at the International Institute for Management Development in Lausanne, Switzerland.

== Career in business ==
Marais began her first job in March 1990 at Momentum, an insurance company. Although she initially planned to become an actuary and was studying towards a degree in actuarial science, she became interested in client management while working in actuarial product development. Thereafter she moved to sales and marketing roles, including as part of the team that launched Momentum Administration Services. In 1999 she left Momentum to join PSG, where she helped set up the group's unit trust, and she later worked as a director at Stanlib and as an executive general manager at Old Mutual. Between 2009 and 2018, she worked at investment management firm Allan Gray, first as co-head of retail and then as an executive director for distribution and client services.

In January 2018, Momentum, by then restructured as Momentum Metropolitan Group after a merger with Metropolitan, announced that Marais would return to the company as second deputy chief executive officer. Her appointment was part of a leadership reshuffle that also included the appointment of Hillie Meyer as chief executive officer; she had spent a stint as Meyer's executive assistant at an earlier stage of her career, and she said that he appointed her to return to Momentum after she expressed frustration with the handling of the Metropolitan merger. Taking up the new position on 1 March 2018, she worked alongside the incumbent deputy chief executive officer, Mary Vilakazi, with special responsibility for Momentum Investments. She also oversaw Momentum Distribution Services, Consult by Momentum, and Momentum Money. In May 2023, at the end of Meyer's five-year term as chief executive, Marais was announced as Meyer's successor with effect from 1 August 2023. She became the first woman to lead the company.

== Personal life ==
She is married to Johann Cilliers. They have no children. Since 2000 they have lived in Hout Bay, Cape Town; Marais commutes to Momentum Metropolitan headquarters in Centurion. They also own a farm in Paternoster. Marais has completed several ultramarathons.
