= Thuso Resources =

Thuso Resources was launched on 18 May 2023 by Universities South Africa as an information hub for early career academics, so who wish to advance their research careers The state-sponsored cadre of emerging scholars could not identify mentors, lacked networks and self-confidenceand so the Advancing Early Career Researchers and Scholars (AECRS) programme was launched by the Department of Science, Technology and Innovation to address these stated needs and provide a national toolbox of help resources.

== Overview ==
The materials on the platform are informed by a Community of Practice for Postgraduate Education and Scholarship. This community have recognised the need to openly share their experiences, resources, and skills with peers. Thuso Resources is intended for early-career researchers and scholars who may be overwhelmed by the multiple tasks in academia. Early-career academics have found themselves teaching large numbers of undergraduate students and performing too many responsibilities without adequate guidance. Most of the resources fall under open access. The few Open Education Resources on Thuso Resources allow emerging scholars to "contribute to the creation, sharing and evaluation of knowledge... through research, learning and teaching."

The above quote is sourced from Education White Paper 3, written in 1997, where transformation was imagined as far more than compliance or adherence to national policy goals. Other key elements of transformation also involved epistemological change and an institutional culture that prioritised true inclusion.

Thuso Resources might have been inspired by DBE's Thuthong an open toolbox and platform that was built by Schoolnet for schools. Some of the shared resources on Thuso Resources are openly licensed, like Schoolnet's Thuthong. Their licence choices permit new forms of knowledge production and capacity-building in higher education institutions.Thuso Resources has had interest from all over the globe.
