= Adam Habib =

South African academic

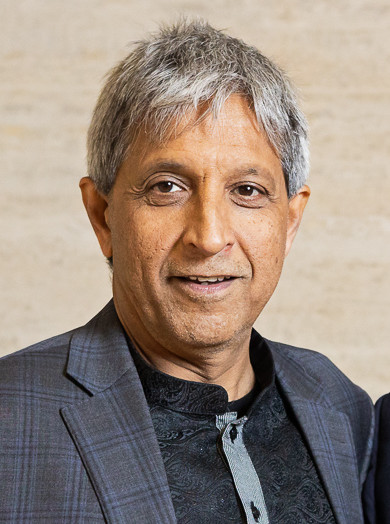
- Adam Habib (2024)

Vice-Chancellor of SOAS, University of London
- Incumbent
- Assumed office 1 January 2021
- Chancellor: Anne, Princess Royal
- Preceded by: The Baroness Amos

11th Vice Chancellor and Principal of the University of the Witwatersrand
- In office 1 June 2013 – 31 December 2020
- Chancellor: Dikgang Moseneke; Judy Dlamini
- Preceded by: Loyiso Nongxa
- Succeeded by: Zeblon Vilakazi

Personal details
- Born: 1965 (age 60–61) Pietermaritzburg, South Africa
- Children: 2
- Education: University of Witwatersrand (BA); University of KwaZulu-Natal (MA); City University of New York (MPhil, PhD)
- Scientific career
- Workplaces: University of Durban-Westville; University of KwaZulu-Natal; Human Sciences Research Council; University of Johannesburg; University of Witwatersrand

Adam Mahomed Habib (born 1965) is a South African academic administrator serving as Vice-Chancellor of the School of Oriental and African Studies, University of London since 1 January 2021. Previously he served as Vice-Chancellor and Principal of the University of the Witwatersrand (Wits) in Johannesburg, South Africa, between 1 June 2013, when the term of his predecessor Loyiso Nongxa ended, and 1 January 2021. He is also a former deputy vice-chancellor of the University of Johannesburg.

== Career ==
Studying at a mix of South African and American universities, Habib graduated as a political scientist having received his Bachelor and Master of Arts degrees from the University of KwaZulu-Natal, Bachelor of Arts (Honours) from the University of Witwatersrand, and his MPhil and PhD from the Graduate Center of the City University of New York.

He has held academic appointments at the Universities of Durban-Westville and KwaZulu-Natal and the Human Sciences Research Council. Prior to being appointed Deputy Vice-Chancellor of Research, Innovation and Advancement at the University of Johannesburg, he served as the Executive Director of the Democracy and Governance Programme of the Human Science Research Council. Before that, he was the founding director of the Centre for Civil Society and a research professor in the School of Development Studies at the University of KwaZulu-Natal.

Habib has served as co-editor of both the social science academic journal Transformation and the official disciplinary journal of the South African Association of Political Science, Politkon. He also sits on the editorial boards of Voluntas and the South African Labour Bulletin. He has served as an external examiner and examined Master's and Doctoral dissertations for a number of South African Universities, including Durban-Westville, KwaZulu-Natal, Witwatersrand, Cape Town, and Rhodes. He has also served on several boards and councils, including those of the University of Durban-Westville, the Durban University of Technology, the International Society for Third-Sector Research, Sangonet, the Centre for Public Participation, and the Centre for Policy Studies.

Habib has published edited books, book chapters, and journal articles in the thematic areas of democratisation and its consolidation in South Africa, contemporary social movements, philanthropy, giving and its impact on poverty alleviation and development, institutional reform, changing identities and their evolution in the post-apartheid era, and South Africa's role in Africa and beyond. He is a well-known public figure in South Africa whose opinions are often sought by both the print and broadcast media.

In December 2012, the University of the Witwatersrand offered Habib the position of the institution's next vice-chancellor after a competitive application process. In February 2020, it was announced that Habib would succeed Valerie Amos as director of the School of Oriental and African Studies, University of London (SOAS) as of 1 January 2021. The role of Director was renamed Vice-Chancellor in 2024.

=== US entry ban ===
In October 2006, while on a trip with colleagues from the Human Sciences Research Council, Habib was deported when he flew into John F. Kennedy Airport in the US. Habib had studied in New York, and he had made numerous trips to New York previously. His wife and young children were also banned from the US.

According to a November 2007 The New York Times article, the US informed Habib he had been barred entry over allegations of "engaging in terrorist activities", and The Christian Science Monitor reported that he had been barred due to having "links to terrorism". The claim was never substantiated, and the ban was lifted on 20 January 2010 by the American State Department.

=== Tenure at the University of the Witwatersrand ===
During #FeesMustFall protests in October 2015, Wits students mobilized against the government's proposed tuition fee increases.

Writing in the Daily Maverick, political analyst Imraan Buccus stated that Habib was sympathetic to the core demands that gave rise to the #FeesMustFall movement, particularly calls for accessible university education and fair treatment of university workers. Buccus further noted that Habib viewed mass mobilisation as an important driver of social progress, including forms of protest that may be disruptive.

Habib was critical of the movement’s later direction, arguing that although it initially enjoyed broad social legitimacy, this was eroded by what he described as ethically compromised leadership, racial populism, increasingly authoritarian forms of organisation, and political violence.

However, Habib was criticised for bringing a private security company onto campus in response to the protests. The private security company on the Wits campus was condemned by the apartheid-era political prisoner Sipho Singiswa as "militia members mostly in the employment and control of former apartheid security force officers who include members of apartheid 'Death Squad' commandos". A petition of five hundred signatures accused security of sexual violence against students. An academic at the University of Johannesburg suggested the use of private security violated United Nations guidelines.

In an open letter to colleagues, Habib defended the use of private security to manage protests and suggested those condemning its use would also oppose bringing police onto campus, which Habib was against because of concerns about aggression in other university settings during the protests.

A second round of protests broke out in September 2016 when the government announced that fees would rise by up to 8% in 2017. Wits’s private security struggled to maintain order, and academic activities were suspended. After a poll indicated that most students favored resuming classes, Habib called the police, who were criticised for their use of excessive force. In an interview about the protests, Habib indicated he was reluctant to bring the police in to reopen the campus and that it "went against the grain of everything in my life" but it "was perfectly correct [...] it was my most difficult choice.".

In 2023, it was revealed that Tawana Kupe, vice chancellor of the University of Pretoria, had been found guilty of sexual harassment at the University of the Witwatersrand but information about his conduct was not provided to the University of Pretoria before his appointment. Habib was vice chancellor at the University of the Witwatersrand at the time and was subsequently accused of 'turning a blind eye' to Kupe's harassment but denied this. Habib was also accused by the former head of the University of the Witwatersrand's Gender Equity Office of creating "bullying, misogyny and...toxic culture".

=== Tenure at SOAS ===
In March 2021, Habib stepped aside from his position as Director of SOAS, as an investigation was launched into his use of a racial slur during an online meeting with a group of students. He used the word himself when he was responding to student concerns about faculty at SOAS using the word. After being challenged by the students he falsely claimed that "I come from a part of the world where we do use the word". He subsequently apologised for his use of the term in the meeting. An investigation by SOAS found that his use of the word did not necessarily constitute racism and noted that Habib had apologised and admitted he should not have uttered the term in full. The university apologised for his actions and he was subsequently allowed to resume his duties.

SOAS, under Habib's leadership, has also suspended and expelled multiple students that have been involved in activism, particularly concerning Palestine, as well those that have criticised his leadership and the institution's administration. Haya Adam, president of the SOAS Palestine Society, is one such student, and after the SOAS Spirit newspaper conducted a poll asking whether students felt more afraid to participate in student activism, post Haya’s expulsion, 74% of students responded with 'yes'.

== Works ==
- Habib, Adam (2013). South Africa's suspended revolution – Hopes and prospects. Wits University Press. ISBN 978-1-86814-608-6.
- Habib, Adam (2019). Rebels and Rage: Reflecting on #FeesMustFall. Jonathan Ball Publishers. ISBN 9781868428960.

Academic offices
Preceded by Loyiso Nongxa	Vice-Chancellor of the University of the Witwatersrand; 2013–2020	Succeeded by Zeblon Vilakazi
Preceded by Valerie Amos	Vice-Chancellor of SOAS University of London; 2021–	Incumbent
