= Tshimologong precinct =

Tech hub in Braamfontein associated with Wits University

Coordinates: 26.194404°S 28.031919°E

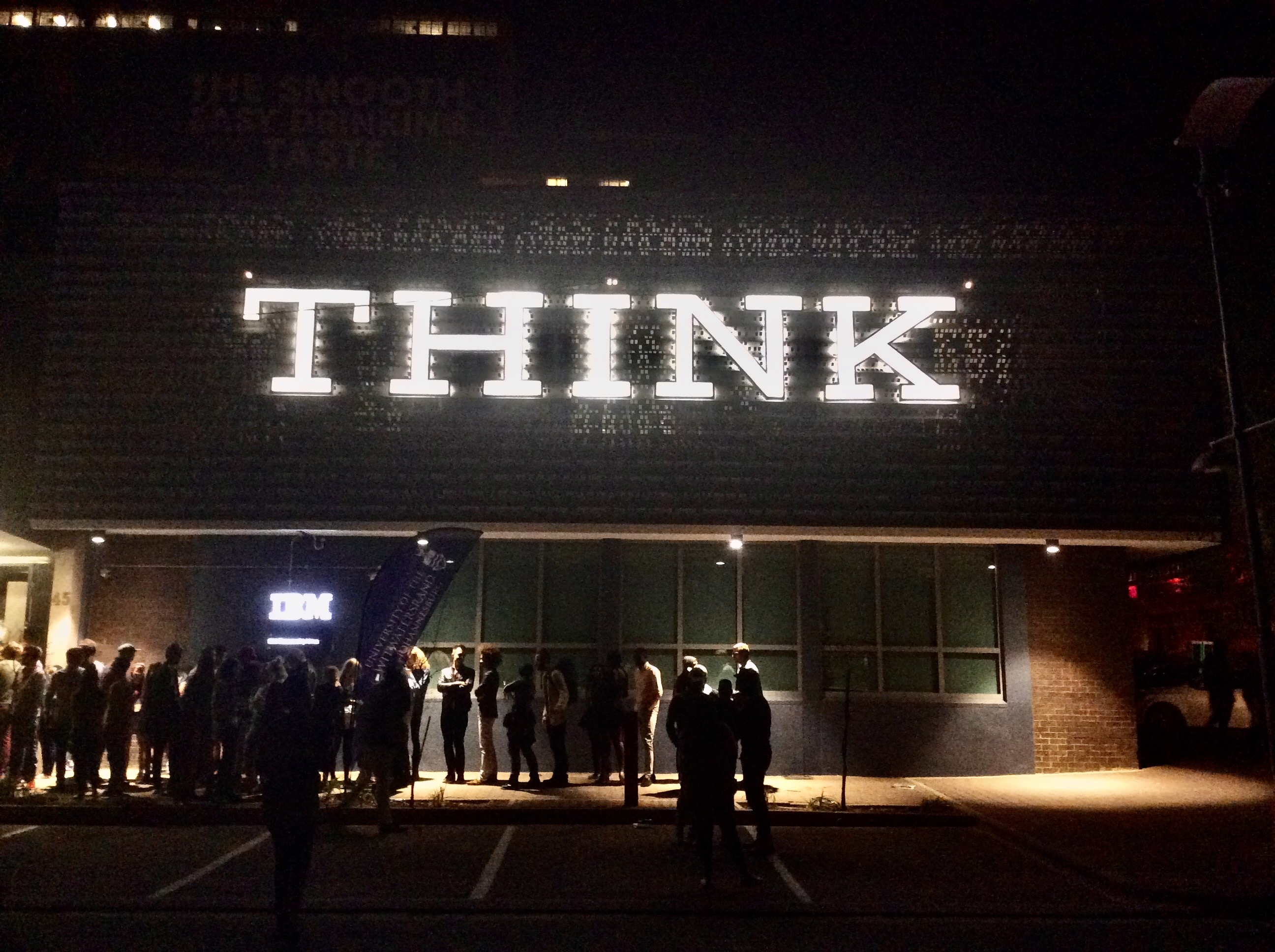
- International Business Machines in the Wits run “Tshimologong Precinct”
- Formation: 2016; 10 years ago
- Website: https://tshimologong.joburg/

The Tshimologong Precinct is a Wits University based tech incubator in Braamfontein. Tshimologong is a Setswana Word for new beginnings. This tech hub was set up by the late Barry Dwolatzky in 2014, and then launched in 2016. On this initiative, Dwolatzky was inspired by start-up urbanism.

The original vision of the precinct was to inspire talent, create employment and commercialise the research of Wits students. Since its establishment, this hub or lab has indeed resulted in spatial changes in Braamfontein, but it is debatable as to whether the Tshimologong Precinct itself has mets its objectives. The Tshimologong Precinct is also the location for IBM’s second research hub in Africa.

== Partnerships ==
The Tshimologong Precinct aspires to facilitate collaboration between academia, corporations, government and entrepreneurs. For example, the Hack Jozi Challenge was a partnership between the City of Johannesburg and Wits University (through the Tshimologong Precinct), which is intended to create and develop digital solutions which could be used to solve common challenges. Conceived as a bootcamp, the Hack Jozi challenge was promoted as a method for aspiring entrepreneurs to deliver innovative ideas annually. Hack Jozi Winners would earn R1,000,000 and business mentorship from the Joburg Centre for Software Engineering, while other prize winners would earn hub mentorship opportunities.

== Fak'ugesi Festival ==

The Fakugesi Festival is an annual festival that has its home at the Tshimologong Digital Innovation Precinct. The 13th Festival, under the theme "African Imaginaries" was held in October 2026, with satellite events taking place at The Anglo American Digital Dome, The Chris Seabrook music hall and the Origins Centre. Digital artists were included in the programme, including Nhlanhla Michael Dhlamini, Evans Akanyijuka, Renzo Filinich Orozco, and Dagmar Schürrer
