= Chris Seabrooke Music Hall =

Concert venue in Braamfontein, South Africa

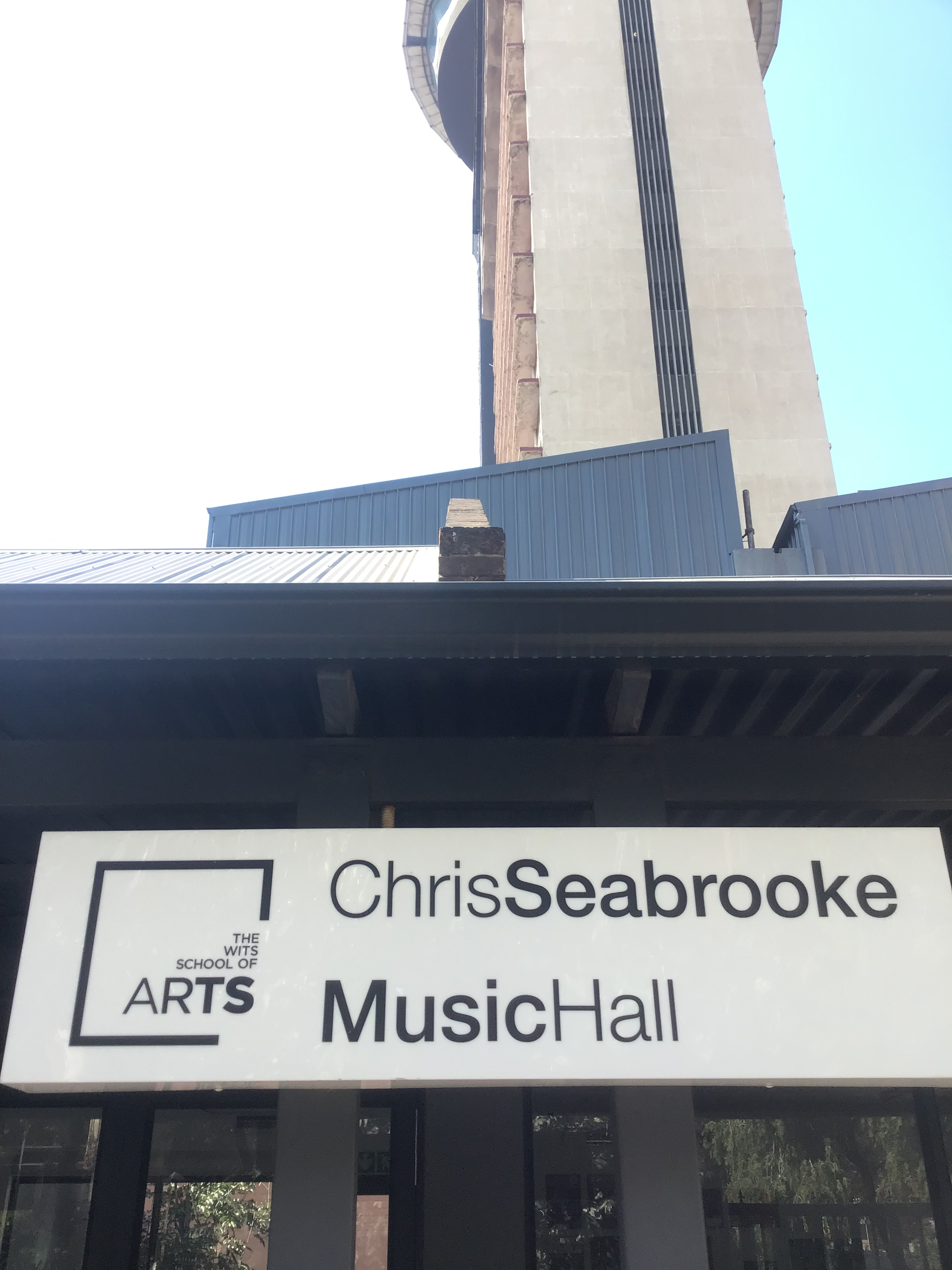
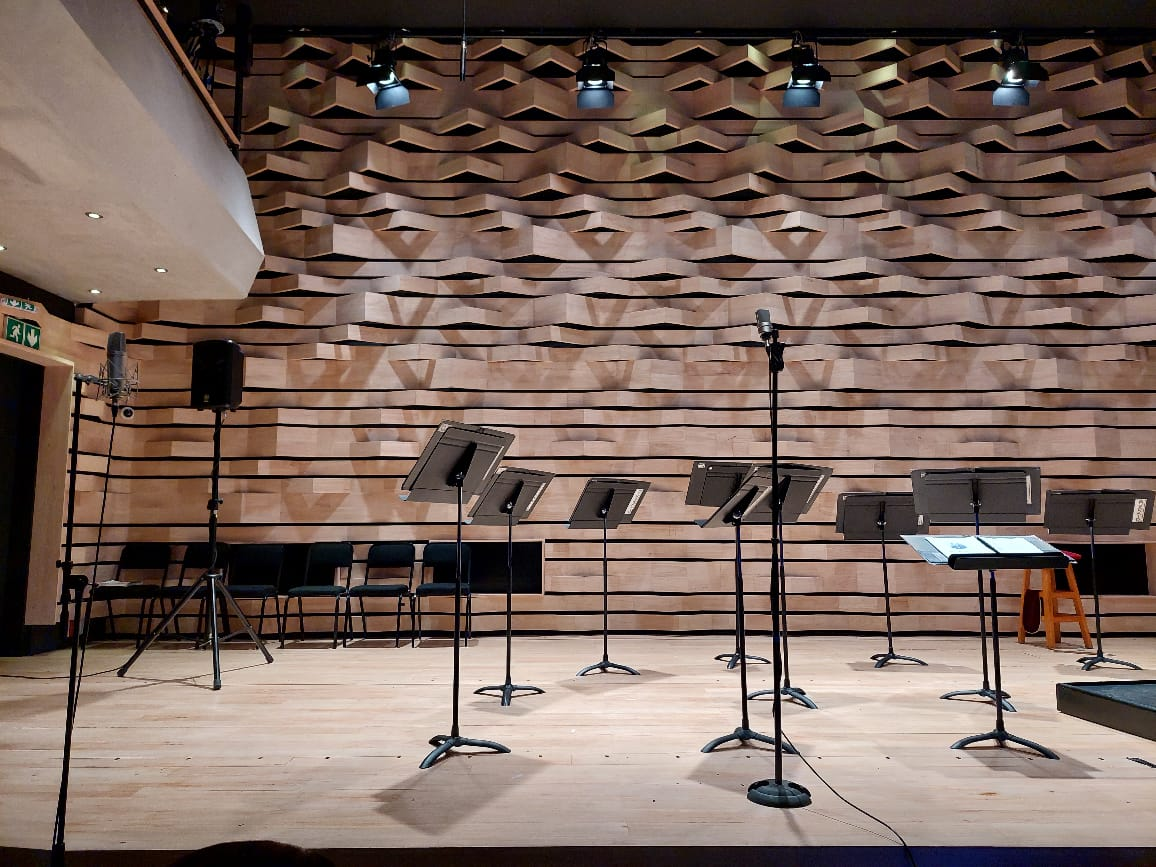
- Seen from off campus (Jorrisen Street) Entrance to the hall from campus (Station Street) The acoustically engineered interior
- Interactive map of Chris Seabrooke Music Hall
- Address: Corner of Station and Jorissen Street; Johannesburg; South Africa
- Coordinates: 26°11′35″S 28°01′57″E

Construction
- Opened: 3 March 2022

The Wits Chris Seabrooke Music Hall is a concert venue located at the University of the Witwatersrand in Braamfontein, Johannesburg. The hall was opened on 3 March 2022 as part of the university's centenary celebrations. Students and staff from Wits Music performed including associate Professors Malcolm Nay, Carlo Mombelli and Chantal Willie-Petersen. The music venue was funded through support from businessman and Wits alumnus Chris Seabrooke, after whom the concert hall is named. Designed by Cohen and Garson architects, the approximately 180-seat venue is used for concerts, student recitals, chamber music, jazz performances, and festivals hosted by the Wits School of Arts. The venue combines acoustic design, a contemporary performance auditorium and a converted heritage building that is associated with early Johannesburg.
