= University of the Witwatersrand Faculty of Science =

Science faculty of the University of the Witwatersrand

University of Witwatersrand, Johannesburg Faculty of Science
- TW Kambule Building, West Campus, University of the Witwatersrand, Johannesburg
- Type: Public
- Affiliations: University of the Witwatersrand
- Dean: Nithaya Chetty
- Location: Johannesburg, South Africa; 26°11′31.19″S 28°01′55.16″E
- Website: www.wits.ac.za/science

The Faculty of Science is one of the faculties of the University of the Witwatersrand, Johannesburg, located in TW Kambule Mathematical Sciences Building on West Campus. The Dean of the Faculty is Professor Nithaya Chetty. The Faculty offers undergraduate Bachelor of Science (BSc) degrees, and postgraduate Honours (BSc Hons.), Masters (MSc) and PhD degrees. The Faculty encompasses the following schools:

- Animal, Plant and Environmental Sciences
- Biology and Life Sciences
- Chemistry
- Computational and Applied Mathematics
- Computer Science
- Geography, Archaeology and Environmental Studies
- Geosciences
- Mathematics
- Molecular and Cell Biology
- Physics
- Statistics and Actuarial Science
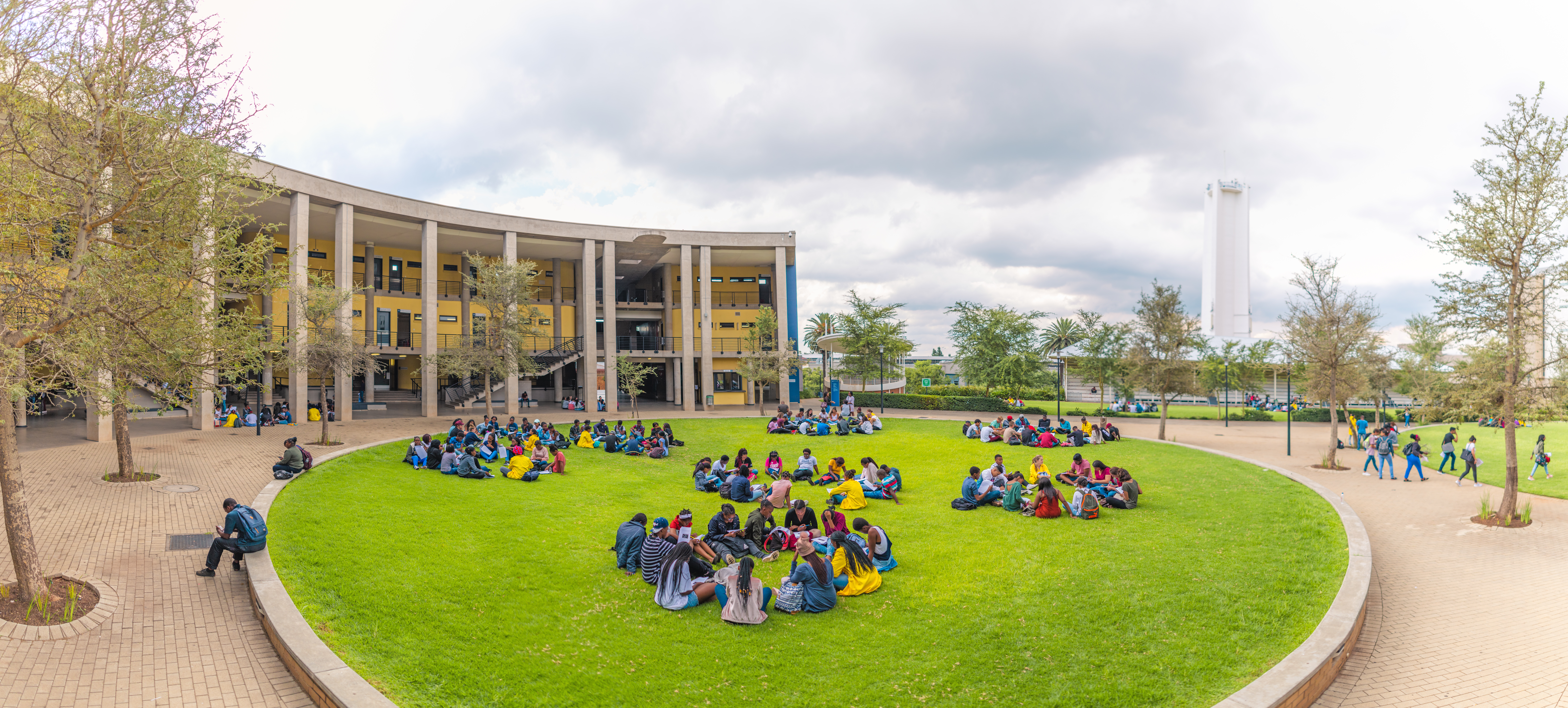
Panoramic view of Science Stadium
