= Norma Reid Birley =

Irish woman academic

Norma Reid, Lady Birley
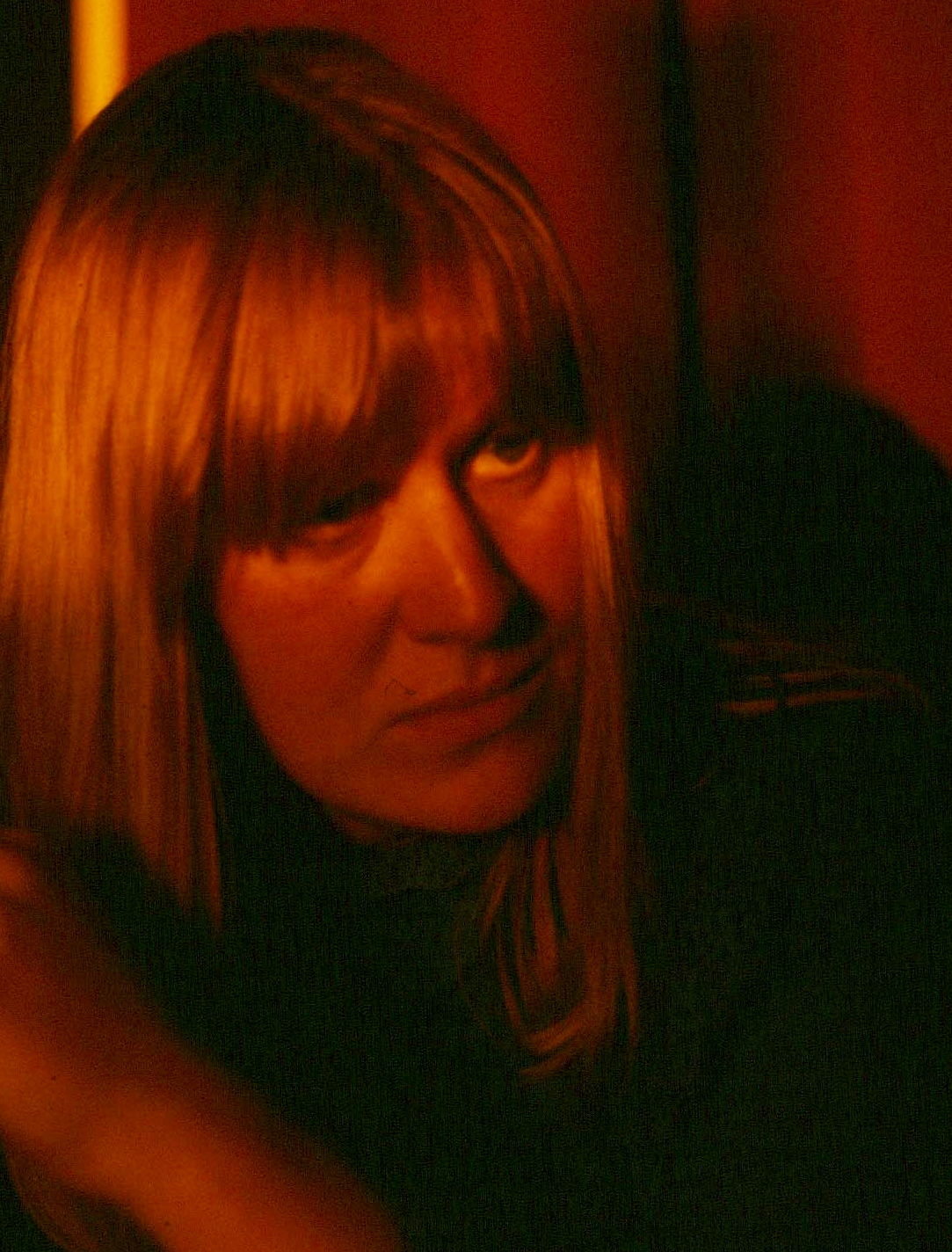
- Born: Norma Glasgo Reid; 28 April 1952; Limavady, Northern Ireland
- Died: 2 April 2026 (aged 73); Coleraine, Northern Ireland
- Citizenship: UK
- Education: University of Ulster; Sussex University; Plymouth University
- Occupation: Educator
- Spouse: Sir Derek Birley
- Website: normareidbirley.com

Norma Glasgo Reid, Lady Birley (28 April 1952- 2 April 2026) was born in Limavady, Northern Ireland) was Vice-Chancellor and Principal of the University of the Witwatersrand. A statistician, and health service researcher, she had also held the positions of director of an academic consultancy firm, Associate Professor of the University of Ulster, and an Honorary Professor of Sussex University. She was appointed to Witwatersrand in 2000, following a 25-year career as a researcher, teacher and senior administrator in higher education.

== Education ==
Birley was educated at Limavady Grammar School, in Northern Ireland, and obtained a BSc and a MSc in mathematics at Sussex University, graduating in 1974. She was awarded a D. Phil by the University of Ulster in 1983 and was made an honorary Doctor of Science Sussex University in 2002.

== Early appointments and research ==
In 1974, Birley was appointed to the DHSS Health Services Research Unit at the University of Newcastle-upon-Tyne. In 1977 she was appointed lecturer in statistics at the London School of Economics. She became interested in pedagogy as a result of being asked to teach a Master's class of sociologists, in finding new graphical ways to communicate her subject to a reluctant audience.

In 1978, she returned to Northern Ireland, to lead an interdisciplinary study of nurse education in the clinical setting at the University of Ulster. In 1984, she became founding Director of that university's Research Centre for Applied Health Studies, and in 1986 she was promoted to a senior lectureship in mathematics. While there, she published the first evidence of the huge exodus of well-qualified school leavers from Ulster in those years.

She was awarded a D Phil by the University of Ulster in 1983; her thesis was a statistical investigation of the relationship between the quality of nurse education in the clinical setting, and the historically used apprenticeship model of nurse education. She sat on the Royal College of Nursing's Commission on Nursing Education (1985), and wrote a chapter in their report on nurse education.

In 1988, she was appointed to Coventry University as Head of Department and Professor of Health Sciences in the first interdisciplinary Department of Health Sciences in the UK, comprising physiotherapy, occupational therapy and nursing. She was promoted to Dean of the Faculty of Social, Biological and Health Sciences in 1991. During these years, she published three books, two of which became standard text books in research methods for nurses, and continued to sell well over two decades. She also published some 70 articles in refereed journals.

== Educational management ==
Birley was appointed Pro-Vice-Chancellor of Coventry University in 1993, with responsibility for academic development. She was appointed as a Quality Auditor of the national Quality Assurance Agency, in 1996, Deputy Vice-Chancellor at Plymouth University, with responsibility for finance, estates, IT and human resources, and in 2000, Deputy Vice-Chancellor for Corporate Development. In these years, she played a leading role in the establishment of the Peninsula Medical School.

In 2001, Birley was appointed as the 11th Vice-Chancellor and Principal of the University of the Witwatersrand in Johannesburg, South Africa, the first woman and the fourth foreigner to hold the position in its then 80-year history. In post-1994 South Africa, her appointment was controversial as a female white foreigner – especially in a university which had a turbulent history of internal and external political friction—two previous Deputy Vice-chancellors had recently resigned.

During her time there, student numbers and external funding reached record levels. She led the establishment of a cultural precinct and raised £2.5 million to found a Rock Art Museum, which was opened as the Origins Centre in 2006. After the death of her husband, Sir Derek Birley, in May 2002, she faced renewed challenges to her leadership. Reid Birley and her allies blamed the Chair of the University Council, though her critics denied this. After informal mediation failed, the University Council, with the support of the Senate, agreed to an enquiry, chaired by a retired judge. However, at the start of the enquiry it was alleged that she attempted to retrieve a statement that her secretary had made to the enquiry from the secretary's computer. She subsequently resigned, saying that she had "made a mistake" though she could have defended herself in court if she had chosen to. She sued the university. Reid Birley and the university reached a settlement of R1.1 million in 2004, with both parties wishing each other well.

In 2003–04, Lady Birley led the development of an econometric/statistical model for the South Africa Department of Labour to predict the financial and human resources impact of HIV/AIDS on major South African companies.

On her return to the UK, she became Director of the Institute for Research in Health and Human Sciences at Thames Valley University, and subsequently, its Director for Postgraduate Development. Since then she had been director of NRB Consulting, a consultancy company in health and social services.
