= Sizwe Nxasana =

South African businessman and educator

- Born: August 7, 1957 (age 69); Newcastle, KwaZulu-Natal, South Africa
- Occupations: Business executive, educator, and chartered accountant
- Known for: In first 10 black Chartered accountant's in South Africa and former CEO of FirstRand Bank
- Spouse: Judy Dlamini
- Children: 2

Sizwe Nxasana (7 August 1957) is a South African business executive, educator, and chartered accountant who was the former CEO of FirstRand Bank.

== Early life and education ==
Nxasana obtained a BCom Accounting degree from the University of Fort Hare and a BCom Accounting Science honours degree from the University of South Africa (UNISA) and was one of the first 10 African CA's in South Africa. He also holds a post graduate certificate in education from UNISA.

Sizwe Nxasana has been conferred with honorary doctorates by the Universities of Fort Hare, the Durban University of Technology, the University of Johannesburg and the Walter Sisulu University.

== Career ==
Nxasana founded Sizwe & Co, KwaZulu-Natal’s first black audit firm, in 1989, and in 1996 he became the founding partner of Nkonki Sizwe Ntsaluba, now SizweNtsalubaGobodo (SNG Grant Thornton). Sizwe was also a member of South African Institute of Chartered Accountants.

He became the CEO of Telkom SA and stayed in that role for 8 years. Subsequently in January 2010, he became the CEO of the FirstRand Banking Group where he had worked for nearly 10 years in different roles.

He was the founder and CEO of Future Nation Schools and Sifiso Learning Group. He became the chairman of Ikusasa Student Financial Aid Programme (ISFAP) which funds and supports students pursuing occupations in critical skills from ’missing middle’ backgrounds. He was the director of the Solidarity Fund and chairs the Fundraising Committee.

He is the co-founder and chairman of the National Education Collaboration Trust (NECT) as a response to the call by the National Development Plan (NDP) for increased collaboration among stakeholders to improve educational outcomes. He was the chairperson of National Student Financial Aid Scheme (NSFAS) from 2015 until 2018 when he resigned after problems with the funding scheme.

== Society work and recognition ==
Mr Nxasana is one of the founding members of the Association for the Advancement of Black Accountants (ABASA) and served as its initial chairperson of its KwaZulu-Natal Branch as well as the organisations president from 1995 until 1998.

Nxasana was cited as one of the Top 100 most influential Africans by New African magazine in 2016.

== Personal life ==
He is married to Judy Dlamini and they have two children. Their son is deceased.
