= National Student Financial Aid Scheme =

South African government student financial aid scheme

National Student Financial Aid Scheme, South Africa

Scheme overview
- Formed: 1996
- Preceding Scheme: Tertiary Education Fund of South Africa
- Jurisdiction: Government of South Africa
- Headquarters: Wynberg, Cape Town, South Africa
- Employees: 399
- Annual budget: ZAR46 billion {2.5 billion usd} (2022)
- Minister responsible: Blade Nzimande, Minister of Higher Education, Science and Technology
- Deputy Minister responsible: Buti Manamela, (Deputy Minister of Higher Education, Science and Technology)
- Scheme executives: Randall Carolissen, Administrator; Gwebinkundla Qonde, Director-General, Department of Higher Education and Training; Kagisho Mamabolo, NSFAS Spokesperson; Andile Nongongo, CEO
- Parent department: Department of Higher Education and Training
- Key documents: NSFAS Act 1999; Higher Education Act 1991
- Website: www.nsfas.org.za

The National Student Financial Aid Scheme (NSFAS) is a South African government student financial aid scheme which provides financial aid to undergraduate students to help pay for the cost of their tertiary education after finishing high school. It is funded by the Department of Higher Education and Training. The programme also manages bursaries such as the Funza Lushaka Teacher Bursary (for students pursuing a teaching qualification). DHET Disability Bursary and other bursaries from the Sector Education and Training Authorities (SETAs).

== History ==
The National Student Financial Aid Scheme was established in 1996, replacing the Tertiary Education Fund of South Africa (TEFSA) in 1999. The TEFSA program was a non-profit company which managed and administered NSFAS since its establishment until 2000. In 1999, TEFSA was converted into a statutory body called NSFAS. The scheme is supported by over R30 billion (in 2018) in funding from the Department of Higher Education and Training, and local and international donations. The bursaries cover the tuition fees, accommodation, and food and travel allowances for "full time" students, and only tuition fees for "part time" students.

In 2019, as of 20 November 2019, NSFAS had received 365,922 applications for financial aid in 2020, compared to the 278,738 applications it had received the year prior.

In 2019, Minister of Higher Education, Science and Technology Dr Blade Nzimande stated that the government had allocated nearly R80 billion for NSFAS over the next three years.

== Financial aid ==
=== Qualifiers ===
South Africa citizens registering for the first time at a public South African higher education institution who meet the means test may receive a bursary. The means test requires that the applicant's combined household income (gross) does not exceed R350,000 per annum. The bursary also covers a few post-graduate student qualifications (such as a postgraduate certificate in education).

=== Loan repayment (pre-2018) ===
Prior to the announcement by former President Jacob Zuma of free higher education for poor students in 2017, NSFAS bursaries were "loans" which needed to be paid back. The loan repayment began once the student had found employment and was earning R80,000 or more annually. If the student was unemployed, they did not have to make repayments until they were employed. If the student left university or college, a case where they did not complete their qualification, the loan would still have to be repaid. As of 2019, all accrued "loans" from NSFAS prior to 2018 must still be paid back.

=== Free subsidised higher education (post-2018) ===
On 16 December 2017, former President Jacob Zuma announced that "fully subsidised free higher education and training for poor and working class South African students" would be phased in by the South African government over a period of five years.

In March 2021, the NSFAS announced that its funding was insufficient to fund first-year students. In the same month, the NSFAS's executive board faced criticism for incurring billions of rands in irregular expenditures for the last three years, including R522 million in the past year.

== Application process ==
Applications for a NSFAS bursary can be made both online and in-person. Applications are typically open between September and November in the year preceding the first year of higher education. Online applications can be made on the NSFAS website. Applications can also be made at the Financial Aid Office (FAO) or Student Service Centre at the higher education institution the student applied at, as well as at National Youth Development Agency (NYDA) offices.
