= Judy Dlamini =

South African businesswoman and author

Chancellor of the University of the Witwatersrand
- Incumbent
- In role 01 December 2018
- Preceded by: Dikgang Moseneke

Personal details
- Born: Nobuhle Judith Dlamini; 6 July 1959 (age 67) Westville, KwaZulu-Natal, South Africa
- Spouse: Sizwe Nxasana
- Education: University of the Witwatersrand University of the Free State University of South Africa University of Natal
- Profession: Businesswoman

Judy Dlamini (born 10 July 1959) is a South African businesswoman and author who is the Chancellor of the University of the Witwatersrand and the founding chairman of Mbekani Group. She served as chairperson of the board of Aspen Pharmacare Holdings from November 2007 until December 2015 while concurrently serving as non-executive director from July 2005 until December 2015. In 2020 the magazine Forbes called her one of Africas 50 most powerful women. In 2022, she was mentioned by Forbes as one of the 50 over 50 women leading the way throughout Europe, the Middle East and Africa.

== Books and publications ==
- GROW TO BE GREAT: AWESOME AFRICAN ACHIEVERS
- Equal but Different: Women Leaders' Life Stories: Overcoming Race, Gender & Social Class
- THE OTHER STORY, A Fireside chat with African Achievers
- Equal But Different: Women Leader's Life Stories, Overcoming Race, Gender and Social Class
