= University of the Witwatersrand =

Public university in Johannesburg, South Africa

- Universiteit van die Witwatersrand (Afrikaans)
- Former names: South African School of Mines (1896–1904), Transvaal Technical Institute (1904–1906), Transvaal University College (1906–1910), South African School of Mines and Technology (1910–1920), University College, Johannesburg (1920–1922)
- Motto: Scientia et Labore (Latin)
- Type: Public university
- Established: 1 March 1922; 104 years ago
- Affiliations: AAU, ACU, FOTIM, HESA, IAU
- Chancellor: Judy Dlamini
- Vice-Chancellor: Zeblon Vilakazi
- Chairman of Council: Isaac Shongwe
- Academic staff: 1,112 (Full-time, Permanent)
- Students: 40,259
- Undergraduates: 25,352
- Postgraduates: 14,025
- Doctoral students: 2,153
- Location: Johannesburg, Gauteng, South Africa; 26°11′27″S 28°1′49″E
- Campus: Two urban, three suburban campuses
- Colours: Blue; Gold
- Nicknames: Wits, Witsie
- Mascot: Kudos Kudu
- Website: www.wits.ac.za

The University of the Witwatersrand, Johannesburg (/vətˈvɑːtəsrɑːnt/), commonly known as Wits University or Wits, is a leading multi-campus public research university situated in the economic hub of Johannesburg, South Africa. It is known for its academic and research excellence, commitment to social justice, and the advancement of the public good. It was ranked the top university in South Africa and 200th globally in July 2026, according to the Center for World University Rankings (CWUR), a widely accepted objective university ranking standard. Wits University has been recognised as the top-ranked university in sub-Saharan Africa for innovation performance in the 2025 Global Innovation Index.

The university has its roots in the mining industry, as do Johannesburg and the Witwatersrand in general. Founded in 1896 as the South African School of Mines in Kimberley, it is the third oldest South African university in continuous operation.

The university has an enrollment of 41,702 students as of 2025, of which approximately 20 percent on campus in the university's 17 residences. About 61 percent (25,835) of the university's total enrollment is for undergraduate study, with 39 percent (15,867) being postgraduate or occasional students. The university assists students to access higher education as far as its resources allow. The university has an acceptance rate of approximately 4.5%, having received 140,000 applications but only having accepted 6,300 students.

Wits has five faculties, 33 schools and seven campuses in Parktown, Braamfontein and a rural campus in Mpumalanga. The university hosts South Africa's only private teaching hospital, the Wits Donald Gordon Medical Centre. It also owns the Wits Sterkfontein Caves in the Cradle of Humankind World Heritage Site. In 2016 the Tshimologong Digital Innovation Precinct was opened in Braamfontein.

The Wits Rural Campus in Mpumalanga conducts longitudinal research in science, health, social and economic areas, which can for example, be compared to data in urban settings.

Nelson Mandela was one of four Nobel laureates that emanate from Wits - the others were Sir Sydney Brenner, Aaron Klug, and Nadine Gordimer, alongside several other prominent Witsies.

== History ==
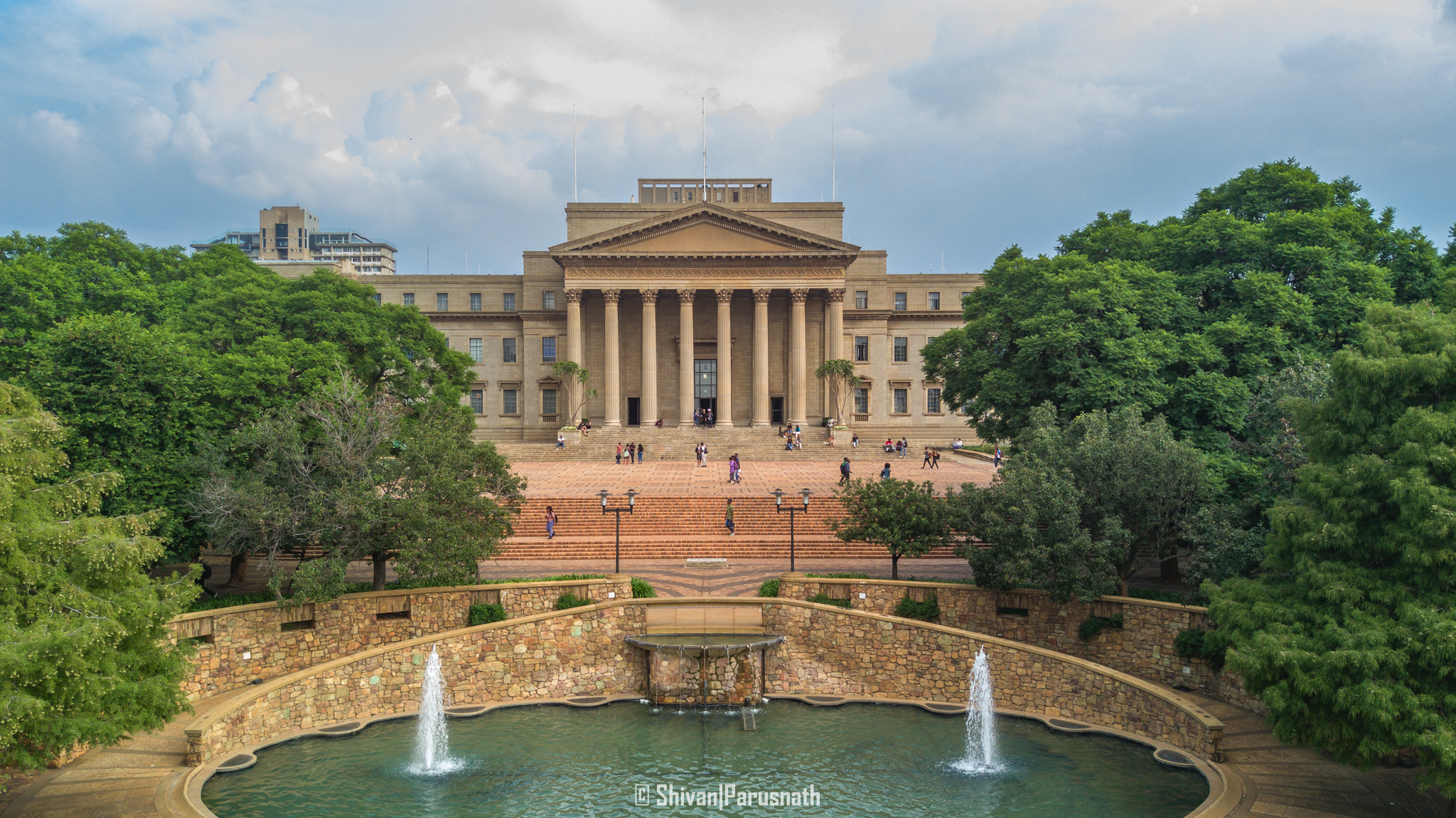
The Great Hall, part of Robert Sobukwe Block, was officially opened in 1940 and has since become the ceremonial heart of Wits.

=== Early years: 1896–1922 ===
The university was founded in Kimberley in 1896 as the South African School of Mines. It is the third oldest South African university in continuous operation, after the University of Cape Town (founded in 1829), and Stellenbosch University (founded in 1866). Eight years later, in 1904, the school was moved to Johannesburg and renamed the Transvaal Technical Institute. The school's name changed yet again in 1906 to Transvaal University College. In 1908, a new campus of the Transvaal University College was established in Pretoria. The Johannesburg and Pretoria campuses separated on 17 May 1910, each becoming a separate institution. The Johannesburg campus was reincorporated as the South African School of Mines and Technology, while the Pretoria campus remained the Transvaal University College until 1930 when it became the University of Pretoria. In 1920, the school was renamed the University College, Johannesburg.

=== Open years: 1922–1959 ===
Finally, on 1 March 1922, the University College, Johannesburg, was granted full university status after being incorporated as the University of the Witwatersrand. The Johannesburg municipality donated a site in Milner Park, north-west of Braamfontein, to the new institution as its campus and construction began the same year, on 4 October. The first Chancellor of the new university was Prince Arthur of Connaught and the first Principal (a position that would be merged with that of Vice-Chancellor in 1948) was Professor Jan Hofmeyr. Hofmeyr set the tone of the university's subsequent opposition to apartheid when, during his inaugural address as Principal he declared, while discussing the nature of a university and its desired function in a democracy, that universities "should know no distinctions of class, wealth, race or creed". True to Hofmeyr's words, from the outset Wits was an open university with a policy of non-discrimination on racial or any other grounds.

Initially, there were six faculties - Arts, Science, Medicine, Engineering, Law and Commerce - 37 departments, 73 academic staff, and approximately 1,000 students. In 1923, the university began moving into the new campus, vacating its former premises on Eloff Street for the first completed building in Milner Park: the Botany and Zoology Block. In 1925, the Prince of Wales (the future Edward VIII) officially opened Central Block (which includes the Great Hall).

The university's first library, housed at the time in what was meant to be a temporary construction, was destroyed in a fire on Christmas Eve in 1931. Following this, an appeal was made to the public for £80,000 to pay for the construction of a new library, and the acquisition of books. This resulted in the construction of the William Cullen Library; opened in 1934. During this period, as the Great Depression hit South Africa, the university was faced with severe financial restrictions. Nonetheless, it continued to grow. From a total enrolment of 2,544 students in 1939, the university grew to 3,100 in 1945. This growth led to accommodation problems, which were temporarily resolved by the construction of wood and galvanised-iron huts in the centre of the campus (which remained in use until 1972).

During World War II, Wits was involved in South Africa's war efforts. The Bernard Price Institute of Geophysical Research was placed under the Union of South Africa's defence ministry and was involved in important research into the use of radar. Additionally, an elite force of female soldiers was trained on the university's campus.

In 1948 the National Party (NP) was voted into power by South Africa's white electorate, and apartheid (Afrikaans for "separateness") policies started to become law. The racist separation policies sparked a response, in 1957, by Wits, the University of Cape Town, Rhodes University and the University of Natal, who issued a joint statement entitled "The Open Universities in South Africa", committing themselves to the principles of university autonomy and academic freedom.

In 1959, the apartheid government's Extension of University Education Act forced restricted registrations of black students for most of the apartheid era; despite this, several notable black leaders graduated from the university. Wits protested strongly and continued to maintain a firm and consistent stand in opposition to apartheid. This marked the beginning of a period of conflict with the apartheid regime, which also coincided with a period of growth for the university. It was desegregated once again, prior to the abolition of apartheid, in 1990.

=== Growth and opposition to apartheid: 1959–1994 ===
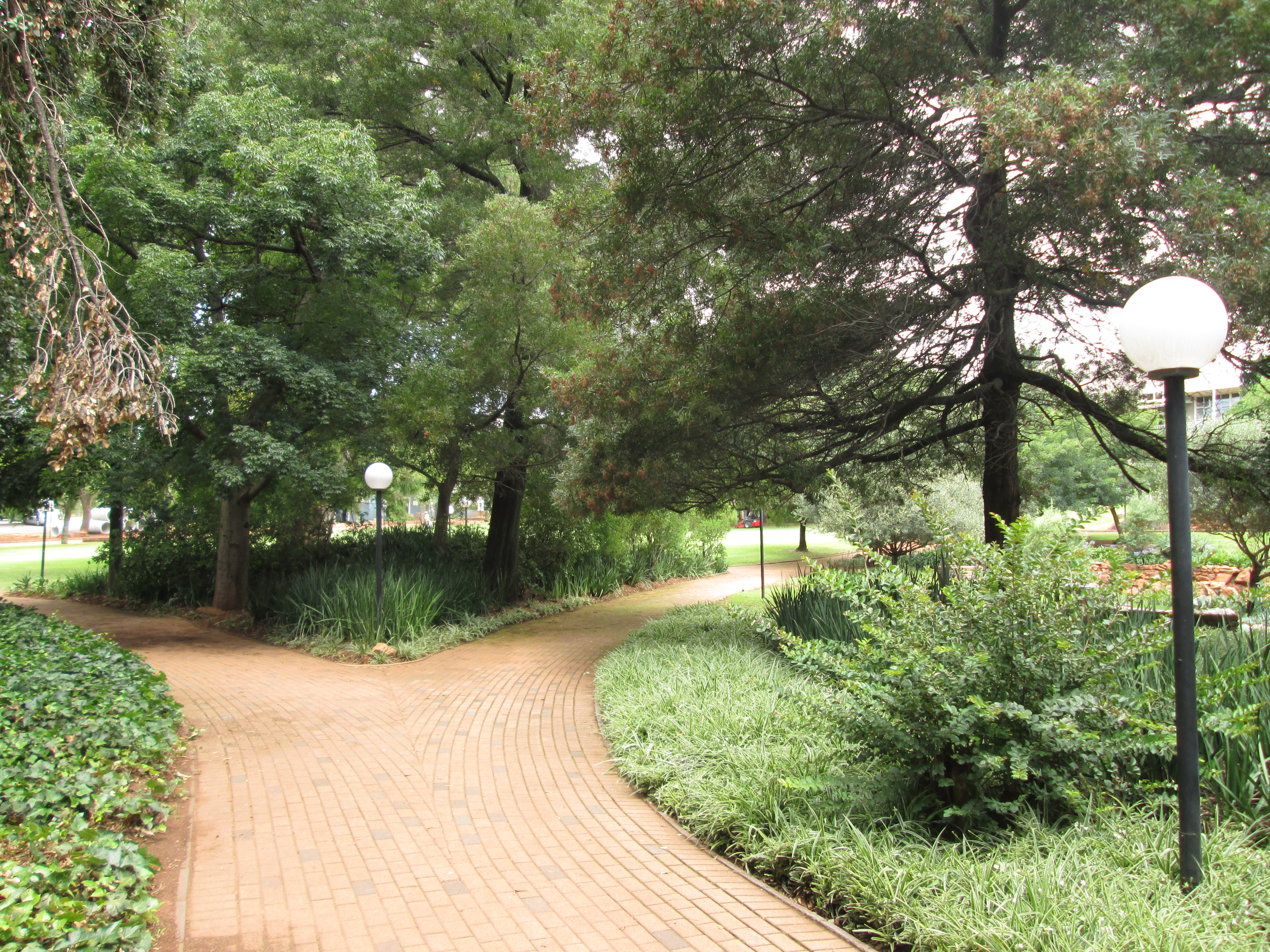
The Gavin Reilly Green on West Campus

As the university continued to grow to over 16,400 by 1985, the expansion of the university's campus became imperative. In 1964, the medical library and administrative offices of the Faculty of Medicine moved to Esselen Street, in the Hillbrow district of Johannesburg. In 1968, the Graduate School of Business was opened in Parktown. A year later, the Ernest Oppenheimer Hall of Residence and Savernake, the new residence of the vice-chancellor (replacing Hofmeyr House on the main campus) were both established, also in Parktown. That same year, the Medical School's new clinical departments were opened.

During the course of the 1960s, Wits acquired a limestone cave renowned for its archaeological material located at Sterkfontein. A farm next to Sterkfontein named Swartkrans rich in archaeological material was purchased in 1968 and excavation rights were obtained for archaeological and palaeontological purposes at Makapansgat, located in the Limpopo Province.

The 1960s also witnessed widespread protest against apartheid policies. This resulted in numerous police invasions of campus to break up peaceful protests, as well as the banning, deportation and detention of many students and staff. Government funding for the university was cut, with funds originally meant for Wits often being channelled to the more conservative Afrikaans universities instead.

The 1970s saw the construction of Jubilee Hall and the Wartenweiler Library, as well as the opening of the Tandem Accelerator; the first, and to date only, nuclear facility at a South African university. In 1976, Lawson's Corner in Braamfontein was acquired and renamed University Corner. Senate House, the university's main administrative building, was completed in 1977. The university underwent a significant expansion programme in the 1980s. The Medical School was moved to new premises on York Street in Parktown on 30 August 1982. Additionally, in 1984 the university acquired the Milner Park showgrounds from the Witwatersrand Agricultural Society including the Tower of Light. These became the West Campus, with the original campus becoming East Campus. In 1984, the Chamber of Mines building opened. A large walkway named the Amic Deck was constructed across the De Villiers Graaff Motorway which bisects the campus, linking East Campus with West Campus.

The 1980s also witnessed a period of heightened opposition to apartheid, as the university struggled to maintain its autonomy in the face of attacks from the apartheid state. Wits looked anew to the "Open Universities" statement of 1957, to which the University of the Western Cape now also added its voice. As the apartheid government attempted, through the threat of financial sanctions, to bring Wits under firmer control, protest escalated culminating in the General Assembly of 28 October 1987, at which the university reiterated its commitment to the values underlying the "Open Universities" statement.

University management itself came under increasing grassroots pressure to implement change within the university. A Wits-initiated research project, Perspectives of Wits (POW), published in 1986, revealed a surprising disconnect between the perceptions disadvantaged communities had of Wits and the image Wits had been attempting to convey of itself as a progressive opponent of apartheid. POW, which had involved interviews with members of organisations among disadvantaged communities in the PWV area, international academics, students and staff at Wits, and even a meeting with the then-banned ANC in Lusaka, revealed that to many in the surrounding disadvantaged communities, there was a perception of Wits as an elitist institution dominated by white interests. A need was identified for further transformation of the university.

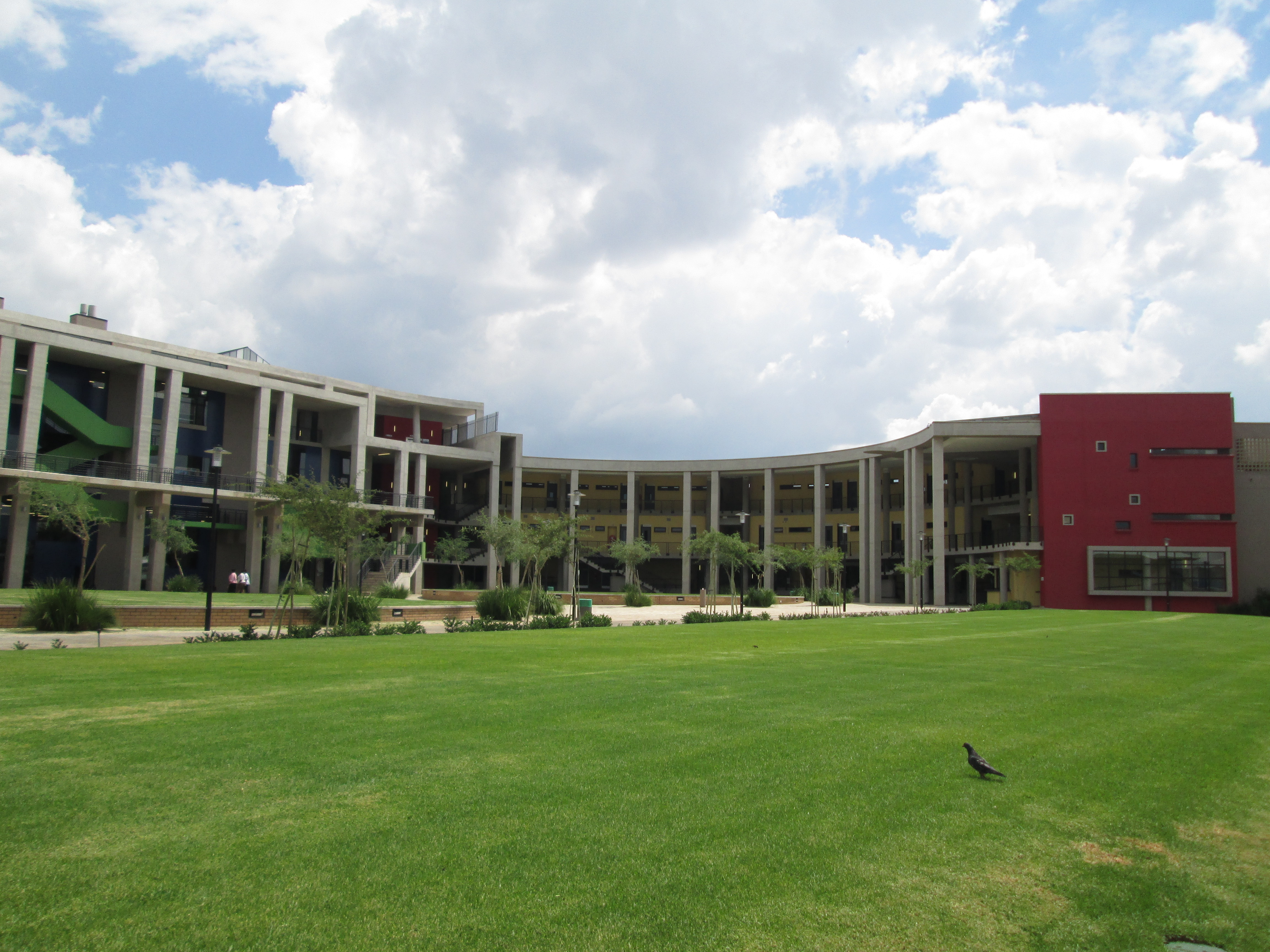
The Science Stadium, on West Campus, completed in 2012

=== Post-apartheid: 1994 – present ===
On 25 February 2000, university management began implementing a policy called "Wits 2001" under which work deemed "non-core" to the functioning of the university (such as cleaning and landscaping) was outsourced to external contractors; the university's academic departments were also restructured: the university's nine faculties were reduced to five, the university's 99 departments were merged into 40 schools, and courses that were deemed redundant following a mass review were cancelled.

Wits 2001 attracted widespread criticism from the workers and staff affected, as well as from students and other staff. The arguments behind the restructuring were criticised as badly reasoned, and the policy itself was criticised as being regressive and neoliberal. The then-vice-chancellor, Professor Colin Bundy, said in defence of Wits 2001 that "[t]his fundamental reorganisation of both academic activities and support services will equip the University for the challenges of higher education in the 21st Century". Management issued a statement on 30 May 2000 responding to criticism of Wits 2001 from the National Education, Health and Allied Workers' Union (NEHAWU), the largest trade union among Wits employees, in which it defended Wits 2001 as constituting the "outsourcing [of] contracts for certain non-core functions, rather than any shift in ownership relations or governance" contra NEHAWU's claims that it constituted privatisation. Management further defended the changes as "improving the financial sustainability of Wits, taking pressure off management and students, and allowing for better academic and support facilities and services".

In 2001, the Johannesburg College of Education was incorporated into the university as Wits Education Campus under the national Department of Education's plan to reform tertiary education in South Africa. In 2003, a student mall, called the Matrix, was opened in the Student Union Building on East Campus. The Wits Origins Centre was opened in 2006 by former president Thabo Mbeki and tells the story of life through its exhibitions. This is alongside the Wits Fossil Vault that houses thousands of plant, animal and hominid fossils, including the Taung Child, Little Foot and Homo naledi.

Five capital projects were also completed over the next ten years - the Wits Art Museum that is home to over 12 000 works of African art, the Wits Science Stadium - an old athletics stadium converted into state-of-the-art chemistry and physics labs on the West Campus, the 4th quadrant of the Chamber of Mines Building (now called the ARM Building), the FNB Building (now the Margo Steele School of Accountancy), and the Wits School of Public Health Building in Parktown.

In 2015 to 2016, the FeesMustFall movement and protests resulted in intermittent disruptions of the academic programme for a few weeks at Wits and other leading South African universities with students protesting for free education. From 2018 onwards, stability returned to Wits and the university continued to be ranked first or second on the continent for academic and research excellence.

In 2022, Wits celebrated its centenary, which included saw the university raise R4.2 billion from donors and alumni as part of the Centenary Campaign. This included raising funds for infrastructure, student support, research and the academic project. This included a R150 million endowment from Wits alumnus Natie Kirsh, for deserving "missing middle" students, the opening of the Chris Seabrooke Music Hall, the launch of the Wits Anglo American Digital Dome, and the reopening of the Wits Sterkfontein Caves, amongst other projects.

=== Coat of arms ===
The badge of the South African School of Mines

The current coat of arms of the university was designed by Professor G. E. Pearse, and edited by Professor W. D. Howie to correct heraldic inaccuracies, before being accepted by the State Herald of South Africa in 1972. The design of the coat of arms incorporates a gold background in the upper section of the shield to represent the Witwatersrand gold fields – on which the mining industry that gave rise to the university is based – along with an open book superimposed upon a cogwheel, representing knowledge and industry. The silver wavy bars on the lower section of the shield represent the Vaal and Limpopo rivers which form the northern and southern borders of the Witwatersrand gold fields. Above the shield is the head of a Kudu, an antelope typical of the Witwatersrand and the university's mascot. The university's motto, "Scientia et Labore", meaning "Through Knowledge and Work" in Latin, appears just below the shield.

The university's coat of arms evolved from the badge of the South African School of Mines. This badge consisted of a diamond with a shield superimposed upon it. A prospector's pick and a sledgehammer overlaid with broken ore and a mill appeared on the shield. The South African School of Mines' motto was the same as the university's current one and surrounded the shield.

== Governance and Administration ==
As set out in the Higher Education Act (Act No. 101 of 1997) and in the Statute of the University of the Witwatersrand, the university is governed by Council. The chancellor of the university is the ceremonial head of the university who, in the name of the university, confers all degrees. The current chancellor is Dr Judy Dlamini, who spearheads the female Academic Leadership Fellows Programme. The positions of principal and vice-chancellor are merged, with the vice-chancellor and principal responsible for the day-to-day running of the university and accountable to Council. The current vice-chancellor and principal is Prof. Zeblon Vilakazi, a nuclear physicist who will lead Wits until 2030. Council is responsible for the selection of all vice-chancellors, deputy vice-chancellors and deans of faculty.

== Campuses ==
The university spans 480 hectares and is divided into five academic campuses, with the administration building on the Braamfontein East Campus. Across the De Villiers Graaff Motorway lies the West Campus. The two are joined by a brick-paved bridge across the highway called the Sibanye-Stillwater Bridge. East and West Campus effectively form a single campus, bordered by Empire Road to the north, Jan Smuts Avenue to the east, Jorissen Street and Enoch Sontonga Road to the south and Annet Road to the west. The historic East Campus is primarily the home of the faculties of Science and Humanities, as well as Solomon Mahlangu House where the university's Council, Senate and management meet. West Campus houses the faculties of Engineering and the Built Environment, and Commerce, Law and Management. East Campus is home to four residences, namely Men's Res (male), Sunnyside (female), International House (mixed) and Jubilee Hall (female). West Campus is home to David Webster Hall (female), Barnato Hall and West Campus Village (both mixed).

Wits has three more academic campuses, all located in Parktown. The Wits Education Campus houses the Wits School of Education, within the Faculty of Humanities and boasts three female residences, forming the Highfield cluster, namely Girton, Medhurst and Reith Hall. To the east of the Wits Education Campus (across York Road) lies the Faculty of Health Sciences that houses the Wits Medical School and the Philip V. Tobias Building, which is the Faculty's administration building. To the West of the Wits Education Campus (across Victoria Avenue) lies the Wits Management Campus, with the triple accredited Wits Business School. Within the Wits Management Campus are the Ernest Oppenheimer Hall (male residence) and the mixed Parktown Village.

Other residences include Graduate Lodge, Campus Lodge, South Court, Noswal Hall and Braamfontein Centre; all in the city district of Braamfontein and all mixed gender. Further, there is the Wits Junction (mixed) and the Knockando Halls of Residence (a male residence located on the grounds of a Parktown mansion called Northwards) in Parktown.

== Sites ==
=== Provincial heritage sites and heritage objects ===
The University of the Witwatersrand houses two provincial heritage sites and two heritage objects. The Great Hall (technically the façade of the Robert Sobukwe Building, formerly known as Central Block, in which the Great Hall is located), and the Dias Cross housed in the William Cullen Library are both provincial heritage sites. They were formerly national monuments, until 1 April 2000 when the National Monuments Council was replaced by a new system which made former national monuments the responsibility of provincial governments following the passage of the National Heritage Resources Act. The heritage objects are Jan Smuts' study, housed in Jan Smuts House, and the Paul Loewenstein Collection of rock art. All of the university's national heritage sites and objects are located on East Campus.

=== Wits Institute of Social and Economic Research (WiSER) ===
Sarah Nuttall about WiSER

The University of the Witwatersrand is home to the Wits Institute of Social and Economic Research (WiSER), founded in 2001 by Deborah Posel.

=== Cradle of Humankind ===
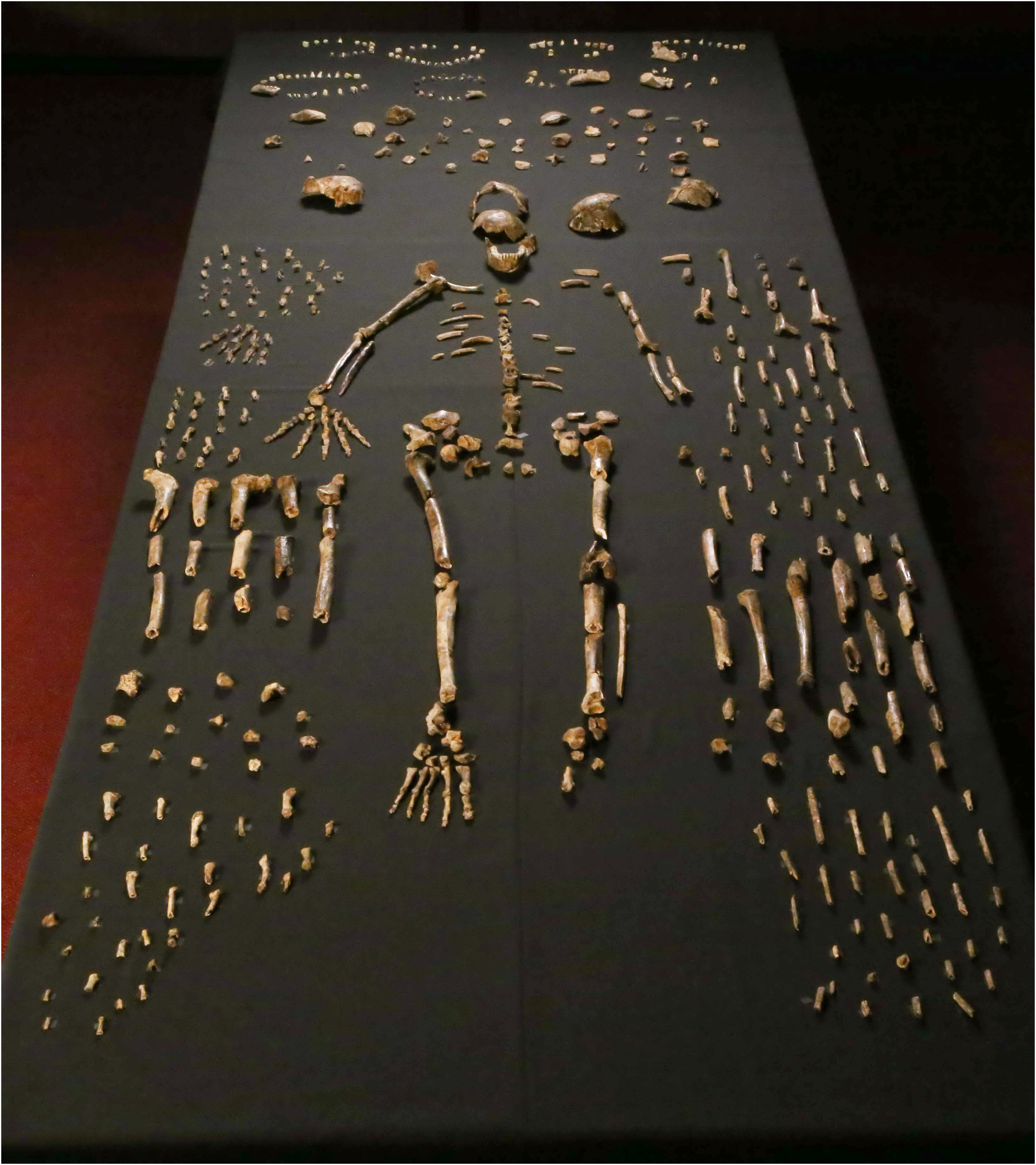
Homo naledi, discovered by a Wits-based team of palaeontologists working in the Cradle of Humankind

Wits acquired the Sterkfontein and Swartkrans sites in the 1960s, both of which were rich in fossil remains of early hominids. In 1999, the area was declared a World Heritage Site by UNESCO as the Cradle of Humankind. As a World Heritage Site, responsibility for the site shifted from the university to the government of Gauteng Province, with the provincial government becoming the designated management authority responsible for developing and protecting the site. It is aided by the South African Heritage Resources Agency, which has also declared the area a national heritage site. The university's Evolutionary Studies Institute within the Faculty of Science, continues to play a leading part in excavations of the site and Wits retains ownership of Sterkfontein and its intellectual rights. Professor Lee Berger discovered Australopithecus sediba (2010) and Homo naledi (2015) at the site. The Wits Sterkfontein Caves reopened to the public in 2025, where Dr Ron Clarke excavated Little Foot. The fossil

=== Museums ===
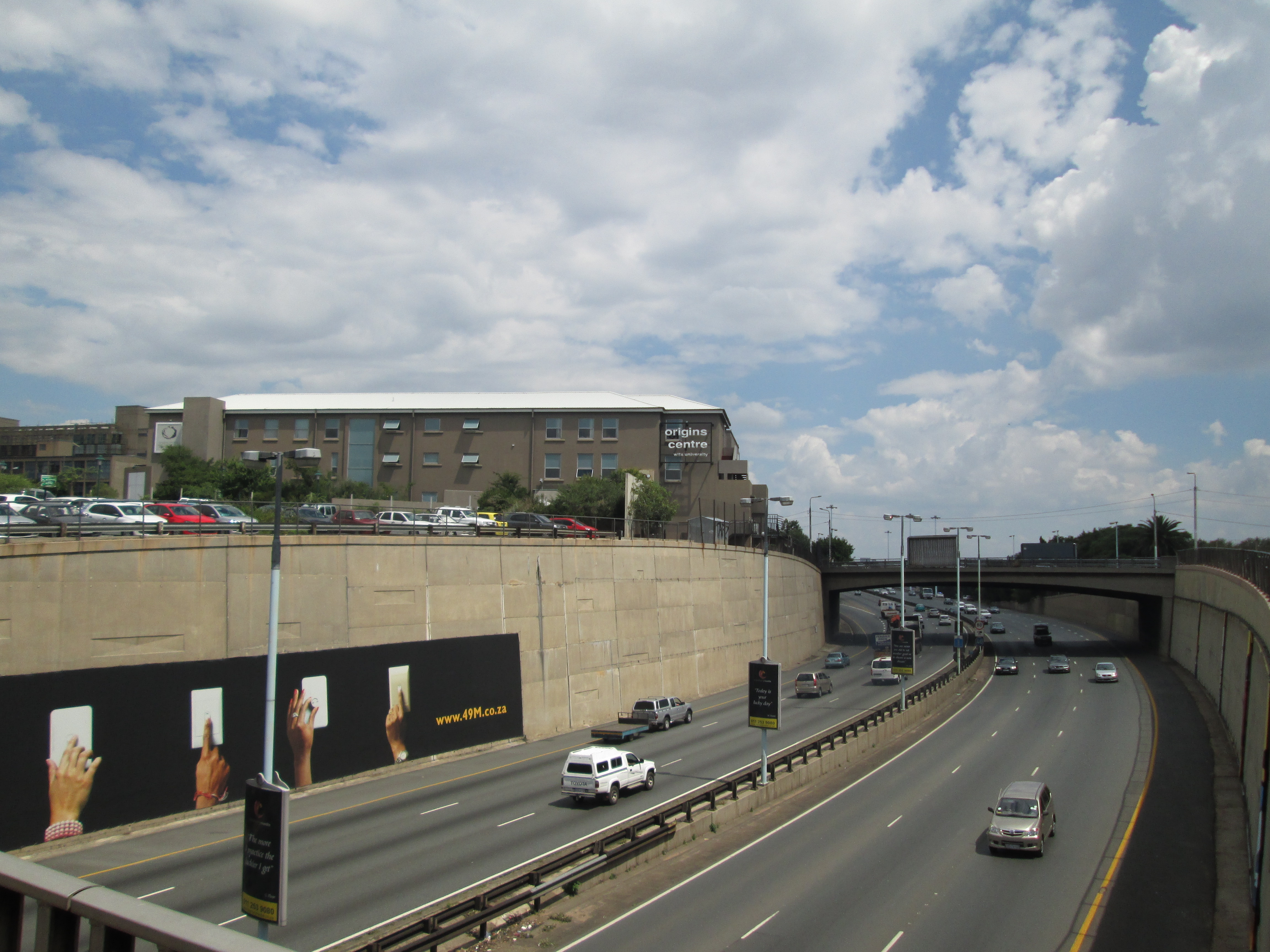
The Origins Centre museum from across the M1

Wits University hosts nine museums, several of which are open to the public. These include the Origins Centre that tells the story of life, the Wits Art Museum which houses 12,000 works of African Art including the Jack Ginsberg Book Collection, the Adler Museum of Medicine on the Health Sciences Campus in Parktown, the Fossil Vault which houses the Taung Child, Little Foot, Homo naledi and various dinosaur fossils and other faunal and floral fossil collections. Wits is also home to the Geosciences Museum, and the Oppenheimer Life Sciences Museum. Some museums like the Hunterian Museum and the Gynaecological Museum are not open to the public and are used for teaching purposes only.

=== Johannesburg Planetarium now the Wits Anglo American Digital Dome ===
The Johannesburg Planetarium was the first full-sized planetarium in Africa and the second in the southern Hemisphere. It was originally bought by the Johannesburg municipality to be set up as part of the celebration of the city's seventieth anniversary. After acquiring an old projector from the Hamburg Planetarium, which was modernised before being shipped to South Africa, the municipality sold the projector to the university for use as both an academic facility for the instruction of students, and as a public amenity. Plans for a new building to house the projector were first drawn up in 1958, and construction began in 1959. The planetarium finally opened on 12 October 1960. The Johannesburg Planetarium was often consulted by the media, and the public, in order to explain unusual occurrences in the skies over South Africa. In 2010, the Johannesburg Planetarium celebrated its golden jubilee.

The Planetarium was closed and was transformed into a Digital Dome which opened its doors to the public in February 2025. The planetarium was renamed to the Wits Anglo American Digital Dome.

=== Wits Art Museum ===
The Museum's collection started in the 1950s. In 1972 the Gertrude Posel Gallery was established on the ground floor of Senate House on East Campus. It was joined in 1992 by the Studio Gallery which formed the "lower gallery" reserved for the display of African art. The galleries' collections grew steadily.

=== Wits Theatre ===
The Wits Theatre is a performing arts complex within the university. It is run by the Wits School of Arts. Prior to the opening of the Wits Theatre, the Wits Schools of Dramatic Art and Music had been staging productions in a building on campus called the Nunnery, a former convent. The Nunnery has been retained as a teaching venue. A new building, the Wits Seabrooke Music Hall was built alongside, and was opened in 2022.

=== Wits Centre for Diversity Studies (WiCDS) ===
The Wits Centre for Diversity Studies (WiCDS) was established in 2014 at the University of Witwatersrand. It is based in the Faculty of Humanities and aims to build capacity to meet the challenges of diverse societies, especially in post-apartheid South Africa through interdisciplinary postgraduate education and research.

== Academics ==
=== Faculties ===
The university consists of five faculties: Commerce, Law and Management; Engineering and the Built Environment; Health Sciences; Humanities; and Science comprising 33 schools.

=== Libraries ===
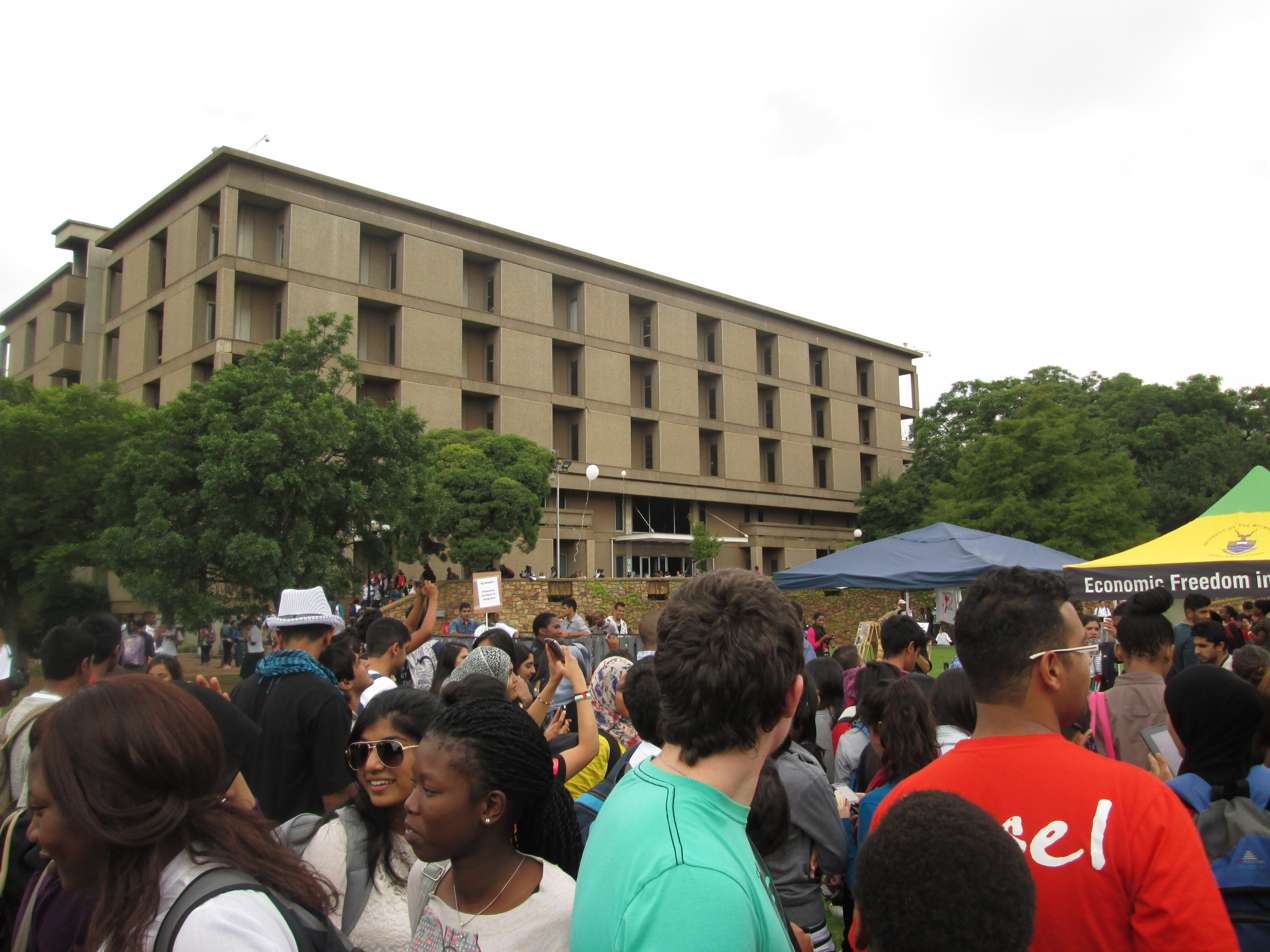
The Wartenweiler Library, on the south-eastern side of the Library Lawns on East Campus

The University of the Witwatersrand Library Service consists of two main libraries, the Warteinweiler and William Cullen libraries on East Campus, and 12 branch libraries. The Wartenweiler Library primarily serves the Faculty of Humanities. It also contains the Library Administration, Library Computer Services and Technical Services departments as well as the Short Loan collection, the Reference collection, Inter-library Loans department, the Multimedia Library, and the Education and Training department as well as the Electronic Classroom. The William Cullen Library contains the Africana collection, specialising in social, political and economic history. It also contains the Early and Fine Printed Books collection, which includes the Incunabula (books printed before 1501). Finally, it also contains a collection of Government Publications and journals in the arts, humanities and social sciences.

=== Reputation and ranking ===
University rankings

Global – Overall
- ARWU World: 301–400 (2023)
- QS World: 291 (2026)
- THE World: 301–350 (2024)
- USNWR Global: =244 (2023)

Regional – Overall
- QS BRICS: 40 (2019)
- THE Africa: 2 (2021)
- THE BRICS: 11 (2020)
- USNWR Africa: 2 (2021)

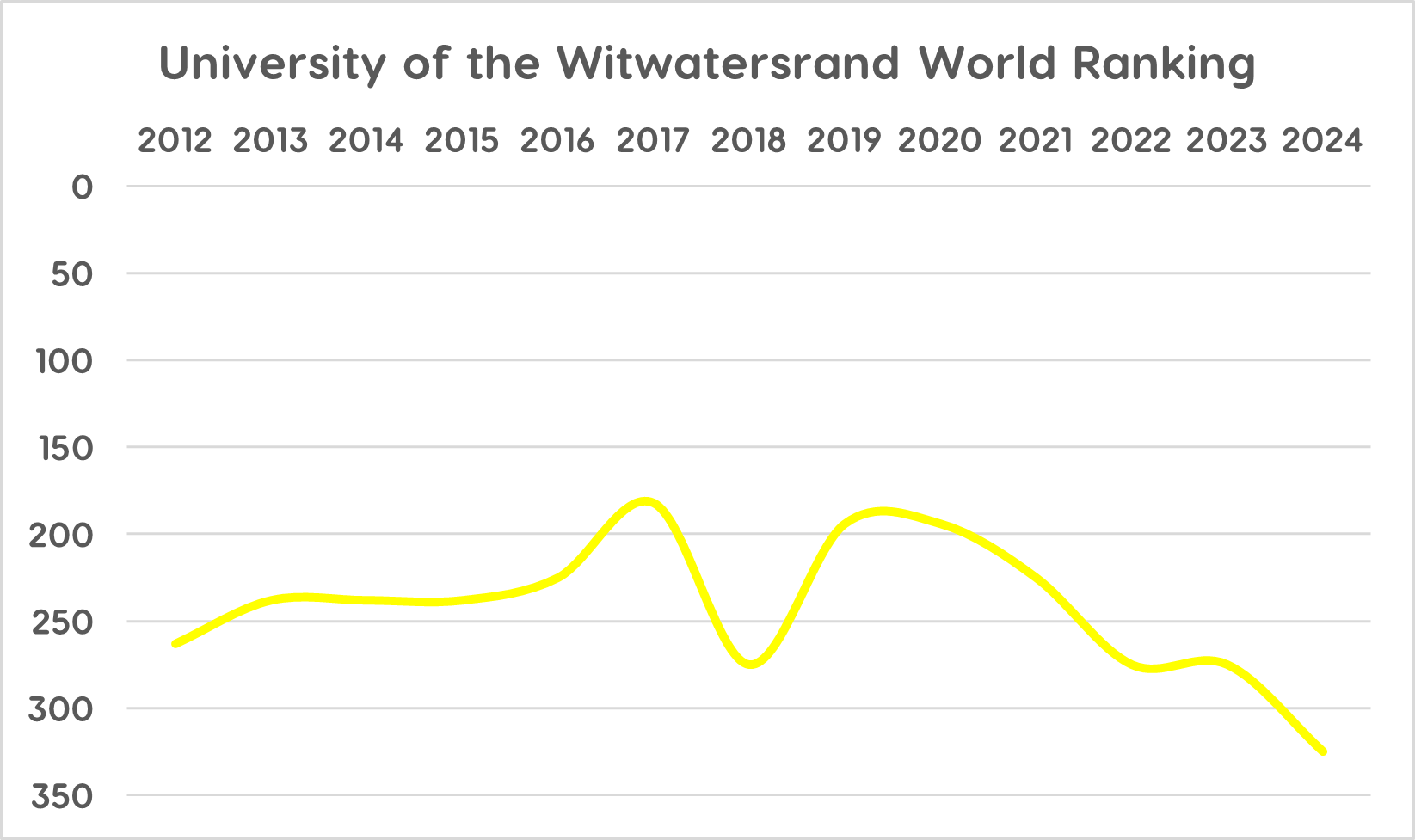
University of the Witwatersrand World Ranking

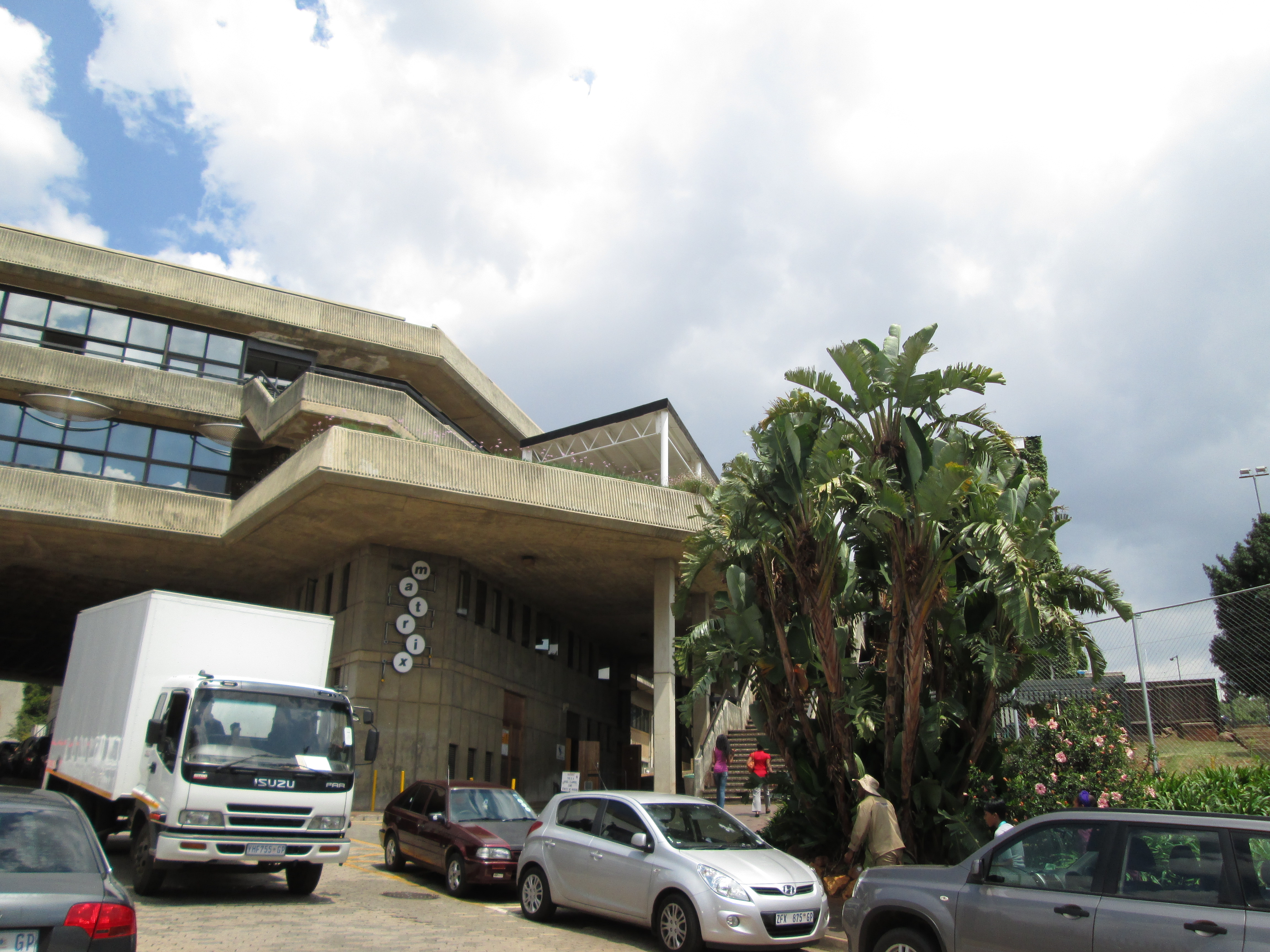
The Matrix Student Centre

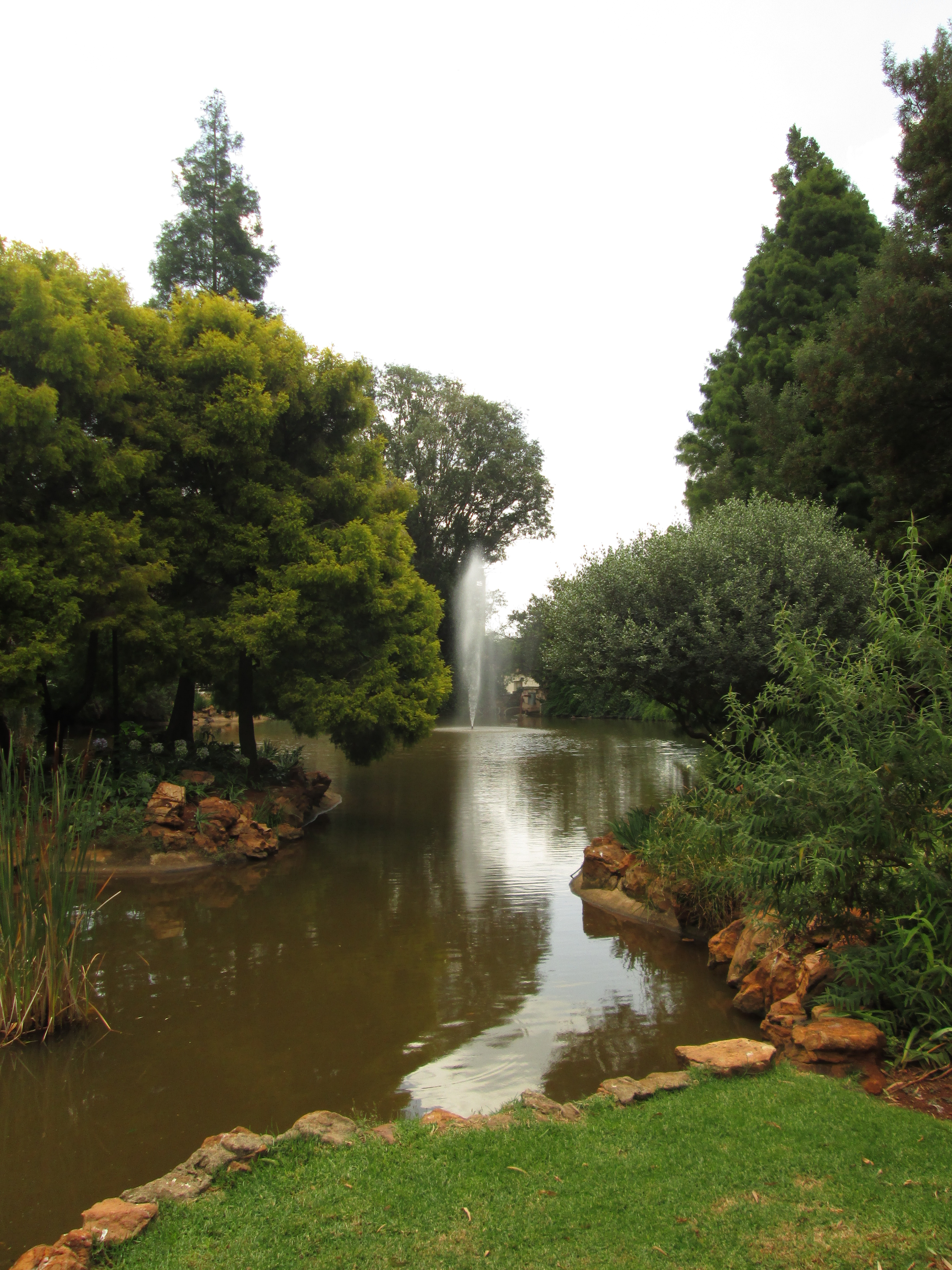
A pond by the Gavin Relly Green on West Campus

In 2019, Wits was ranked 201–300 globally and second nationally in the Academic Ranking of World Universities (ARWU), commonly known as the Shanghai Ranking. In the 2019/2020 Centre for World University Rankings (CWUR) Wits was ranked No. 254 globally (top 1.3% in the world). In the 2019 US News Best Global Universities Rankings, Wits was ranked second in Africa and No. 197 globally with a Global score of 59.9. Wits ranked No. 194 globally in the 2020 Times Higher Education World University Rankings.

The University of Witwatersrand Business School was ranked sixth best among all business schools in Africa and the Middle East in the 2010 according to the QS Global 200 Business Schools Report. Additionally, the Business School's MBA program has been ranked as the top MBA program in South Africa by the Financial Mail for the past six years.

WITS Times Higher Education Ranking 2012 to 2024
Year	World Rank
2024	301–350
2023	251–300
2022	251–300
2021	201–250
2020	194
2019	194
2018	251–300
2017	182
2016	201–250
2015	251–275
2014	226–250
2013	226–250
2012	251–275

== Student demographics ==
The university's demographics reflect those of the country – with about 75% Black African students. Admission is based on merit and academic excellence.

University of the Witwatersrand Student Demographics
Ethnic group	2017	%	2018	%	2019	%	2020	%	2021	%	2022	%
African	21,663	56.44%	23,519	58.38%	24,128	59.01%	24,653	60.62%	26,103	61.89%	27,409	64.40%
Chinese	154	0.40%	149	0.37%	142	0.35%	138	0.34%	128	0.30%	138	0.32%
Coloured	1,490	3.88%	1,588	3.94%	1,623	3.97%	1,599	3.93%	1,643	3.90%	1,616	3.80%
Indian	4,655	12.13%	4,703	11.67%	4,740	11.59%	4,604	11.32%	4,745	11.25%	4,676	10.99%
White	6,719	17.51%	6,580	16.33%	6,362	15.56%	6,025	14.82%	5,872	13.92%	5,372	12.62%
Undisclosed Race	0	0.00%	0	0.00%	0	0.00%	2	0.00%	0	0.00%	39	0.09%
International	3,699	9.64%	3,746	9.30%	3,895	9.53%	3,646	8.97%	3,684	8.74%	3,313	7.78%
Total	38,380		40,285		40,890		40,667		42,175		42,563	

University of the Witwatersrand Academic Staff Headcount
Ethnic Group	2017	%	2018	%	2019	%	2020	%	2021	%	2022	%
African	176	15.80%	184	16.55%	203	17.70%	216	18.62%	226	19.25%	263	20.52%
Chinese	4	0.36%	2	0.18%	2	0.17%	2	0.17%	2	0.17%	4	0.24%
Coloured	54	4.85%	56	5.04%	56	4.88%	64	5.52%	69	5.88%	72	5.67%
Indian	107	9.61%	106	9.53%	108	9.42%	112	9.66%	116	9.88%	133	10.49%
White	484	43.45%	478	42.99%	484	42.20%	476	41.03%	455	38.76%	471	37.07%
International	289	25.94%	286	25.72%	294	25.63%	290	25.00%	306	26.06%	318	25.02%
Total	1,114	100%	1,112	100%	1,147	100%	1,160	100%	1,174	100%	1271	100%

=== Gender composition ===
The gender composition of the university is shown below.

Gender composition, 2018/2019	Percentage	Total number
Female	54.63%	21,994
Male	45.35%	18,257
Undisclosed	0.02%	8
Total	100%	40,259

== Notable alumni and academics ==
=== Nobel Prize Laureates ===
- Aaron Klug, 1982 Nobel Prize in Chemistry
- Nadine Gordimer, 1991 Nobel Prize in Literature
- Sydney Brenner, 2002 Nobel Prize in Physiology or Medicine
- Nelson Mandela, 1993 Nobel Peace Prize

== See also ==
- Dawn of Humanity (2015 PBS film)
- Widdringtonia whytei

== Bibliography ==
- Yamashiro, Shin (2014). "American Sea Literature—on the Sea". American Sea Literature: Seascapes, Beach Narratives, and Underwater Explorations. New York: Palgrave Macmillan. pp. 12–47. doi:10.1057/9781137463302_2. ISBN 978-1-349-49967-0. Online ISBN 978-1-137-46330-2. Print ISBN 978-1-349-49967-0.
- The Golden Jubilee of the University of the Witwatersrand 1972 ISBN 0-85494-188-6 (Jubilee Committee, University of the Witwatersrand Press)
- Wits: The Early Years : a History of the University of the Witwatersrand Johannesburg and its Precursors 1896 – 1936 1982 Bruce Murray ISBN 0-85494-709-4 (University of the Witwatersrand Press)
- Wits Sport: An Illustrated History of Sport at the University of the Witwatersrand 1989 Jonty Winch ISBN 0-620-13806-8 (Windsor)
- Wits: A University in the Apartheid Era by Mervyn Shear (1996) ISBN 1-86814-302-3 (University of the Witwatersrand Press)
- Wits: The "Open Years": A History of the University of the Witwatersrand, Johannesburg, 1939–1959 1997 Bruce Murray ISBN 1-86814-314-7 (University of the Witwatersrand Press)
- A Vice-Chancellor Remembers: the Memoirs of Professor G.R. Bozzoli 1995 Guerino Bozzoli ISBN 0-620-19369-7 (Alphaprint)
- Wits Library: a Centenary History 1998 Reuben Musiker & Naomi Musiker ISBN 0-620-22754-0 (Scarecrow Books)
