= List of University of the Witwatersrand people =

This is a list of notable alumni and staff of the University of the Witwatersrand.

== Arts ==
- Aggrey Klaaste, journalist, editor of the Sowetan, 1988–2002
- Angelique Rockas, pioneer of multi-racial and multi-national theatre London
- Anton Hartman, musician
- Athol Williams, award-winning poet and social philosopher
- Aura Herzog, Israeli writer
- Benedict Wallet Vilakazi, Zulu poet, novelist, and educator, first black South African to receive a PhD
- Candice Breitz, artist, video and photography
- Cecil Skotnes, artist
- Claire Johnston, singer, known as the face and voice of Mango Groove
- Clare Loveday, composer
- Clement M. Doke, linguist
- Clinton Fein, artist, activist
- Hans George Adler, musicologist; collector and classical music promoter, Honorary Doctor of Philosophy (1978)
- Ed Jordan, musician, composer, singer-songwriter, actor, TV and radio presenter; wrote and produced the orchestral score for Spud
- Elisabeth Eybers, poet
- Eric Fernie, art historian
- Ernest Fleischmann (1924–2010), executive director of the Los Angeles Philharmonic
- Ernst Oswald Johannes Westphal, linguist, expert in Bantu and Khoisan languages
- Ezekiel Mphahlele, writer and academic
- Ferial Haffajee, editor of the City Press; former editor of The Mail and Guardian in South Africa
- Fred Khumalo, journalist and author
- Gary Barber, American film producer of South African descent; chairman and CEO of Metro-Goldwyn-Mayer from 2010-2018; co-founder of Spyglass Entertainment
- Gavin Hood, writer, producer and director, directed Tsotsi
- Gideon Emery, actor
- Harold Jenkins (Shakespeare scholar), notable Shakespeare scholar
- Herman Charles Bosman, writer and journalist
- Ingrid de Kok, author and poet
- Ivan Vladislavic, novelist
- Janet Suzman, actress, director
- Jani Allan, writer and journalist
- Jerry Mofokeng, actor
- Jillian Becker novelist, essayist, critic and expert on terrorism
- Johnny Clegg, musician
- Jodi Bieber, photographer
- Judith Mason, painter
- Kendell Geers, artist
- Kevin Volans, composer
- Kitso Lynn Lelliott, filmmaker and multimedia artist
- Lewis Wolpert, developmental biologist, author, and broadcaster
- Lionel Abrahams, novelist, poet, editor, critic, essayist and publisher
- Lionel Ngakane, filmmaker
- Lisa de Nikolits, writer
- Lucy Allais, philosopher
- Manfred Mann, keyboard player for the bands Manfred Mann and Manfred Mann's Earth Band
- Mbali Dhlamini, artist
- Mbongeni Buthelezi, artist known for "painting" in plastic
- Motswedi Modiba, singer-songwriter
- Nadine Gordimer, Nobel Prize in Literature, 1991
- Phaswane Mpe, poet and novelist
- Pieter-Dirk Uys, entertainer, AIDS activist
- Raymond Heard, journalist, editor, media executive, political strategist
- Ruona J. Meyer, journalist, International Emmy Award nominee
- Sibongile Khumalo, singer
- Stan Katz, broadcaster
- Shannon Esra, actress
- Shulamith Behr, art historian
- Thuso Mbedu, actress
- William Kentridge, artist
- Rayne Kruger (1922–2002), author
- Cecily Sash (1924–2019), painter, professor
- Zoe Ramushu, writer, director, producer

== Architecture and design ==
- Denise Scott Brown, architect, planner, writer and educator
- Rory Byrne, former chief designer for the Ferrari Formula One team
- Pancho Guedes, Portuguese architect, participant of Team X
- Allan Greenberg, American architect and one of the leading classical architects of the twenty-first century.
- Rex Martienssen, a leading Johannesburg modernist architect and friend of Le Corbusier
- Theo Crosby, was an architect, editor, writer and sculptor, engaged with major developments in design across four decades
- Michael Sutton, architect

== Business and entrepreneurship ==
- Vusi Thembekwayo, founder and CEO of MyGrowthFund Venture Partners; at 23 founded MOTIV8 Advisory; former "dragon" on Dragons' Den (Mzansi Magic, 2014–2015); recipient of the GQ Business Leader of the Year Award (2020), Guardian Award at the EMY Africa Awards (2024), and District 74 Communication and Leadership Award (2025); author of Vusi: Business & Life Lessons from a Black Dragon (2017) and The Magna Carta of Exponentiality (2018)
- Adrian Gore, CEO of Discovery Holdings Ltd; Chairman of Destiny Health Inc. in the USA and Prudential Health Limited in the UK
- Affiong Williams, founder and CEO of Reel Fruit, a Nigerian company that focuses on processing and distribution of locally grown fruits
- Bridget van Kralingen, Senior Vice President, IBM Global Business Services
- Charles Chinedu Okeahalam, economist and businessman, CEO of AGH Capital Group; former Liberty Life Professor of Financial Economics and Banking, University of the Witwatersrand
- David Frankel (entrepreneur), is a South African-born American businessman. He is the co-founder of Founder Collective, a seed-stage venture capital fund with offices in New York City and Cambridge
- Derek Keys (born 1931), finance minister of South Africa, 1992-1994, in the cabinets of F W de Klerk and Nelson Mandela
- Desmond Lachman (born 1948), economist and former IMF Deputy Director
- Donald Gordon, founder of life insurance company Liberty Life in 1958 with R100,000 when he was 27 years old; awarded a knighthood in 2005
- Elizabeth Bradley, Non-Executive Chairman of Toyota SA Limited; former Executive Director of AngloGold
- Gail Kelly (born Gail Currer), Australian and South African businessperson; first woman CEO of a major Australian bank or top 15 company (2002)
- Gary Barber, Chairman and CEO of Metro-Goldwyn-Mayer Bachelor of Commerce; certificate in the Theory of Accountancy
- Gene Sherman, philanthropist, academic and expert on art, fashion and architecture.
- Gordon Schachat, co-founder of African Bank Limited and prominent art collector
- Graham Mackay, former Chairman and Ex-CEO of SABMiller plc, the world's second largest beer brewer
- Ivan Glasenberg, CEO of Glencore, one of the world's largest commodity trading companies; on the boards of mining companies Xstrata plc and Minara Resources Ltd
- Kay Yarms, Founder of Saxx Beauty
- Koos Bekker, former CEO of Naspers
- Lael Bethlehem, former CEO of the Johannesburg Development Agency; Investment Executive at Hosken Consolidated Investments
- Ludwig Lachmann, economist and important contributor to the Austrian School
- Maria Ramos, economist and businesswoman; CEO of ABSA Group since 2009; former CEO of Transnet
- Martin Morgan, Chief Executive Officer and Director of DMGT
- Meyer Feldberg, Senior Advisor to Morgan Stanley
- Nathan Kirsh, South African-born Swazi business magnate, with a property empire spanning the UK, Swaziland and Australia; has Swazi citizenship; has residency status in the UK and the USA
- Nthato Motlana, giant of South African business and the anti-apartheid struggle; one of the accused, with Mandela and 18 others, in the 1952 Defiance Campaign Trial
- Patrice Motsepe, South African mining magnate; according to Forbes magazine, worth more than R17-billion after adding a further R7-billion to his net worth in 2009
- Patrick Soon-Shiong, South African-American surgeon; founder, chairman, and CEO of Abraxis BioScience
- Percy Tucker, Founder of Computicket, the first electronic theatre booking system in the world in 1971
- Rodney Sacks, chairman, and CEO of Monster Beverage
- Ron Dembo, is an academic and entrepreneur
- Ronnie Apteker, founder of Internet Solutions, one of South Africa's largest internet service providers
- Sarah Langa, Social media influencer and founder of Luvant and Heaton Consulting
- Sir Ernest Oppenheimer, diamond and gold mining entrepreneur; financier; philanthropist; controlled De Beers; founded the Anglo American Corporation of South Africa
- Sir Mark Weinberg, South African-born British financier; founder of Abbey Life Assurance Company
- Sir Winfried Franz Wilhelm Bischoff, Anglo-German banker; chairman of Lloyds Banking Group plc; former chairman and former interim CEO of Citigroup; knighted in 2000
- Sol Kerzner, hotel and gambling magnate; created the most successful hotel group in South Africa, Sun International; Chairman of the Board of Kerzner International, based in the Bahamas
- Steven H. Collis, CEO of Cencora (previously AmerisourceBergen);
- Tony Trahar, former chairman of Anglo American; educated at St John's College and the University of the Witwatersrand
- David Sikhosana, Business Magnet, Founder and Chairman of DSH Group, Educated at the University of the Witwatersrand
- Tsakani Maluleke, Auditor-General of South Africa (2020–present)

== Education ==
- Prof Adam Habib, Vice-chancellor of SOAS University of London, former Vice-chancellor and Principal University of the Witwatersrand
- Prof Brenda Gourley, higher education pioneer; accountant
- Colin Bundy, Warden of Green College, Oxford; former Director and Principal of School of Oriental and African Studies, former Deputy Vice-Chancellor of University of London; former Vice-Chancellor and Principal of University of the Witwatersrand
- David B. A. Epstein, is a mathematician known for his work in hyperbolic geometry, 3-manifolds, and group theory, amongst other fields
- Garth Saloner, Dean of the Stanford Graduate School of Business
- Hazel Sive, is a South African-born biologist and educator
- Jane den Hollander, Vice-Chancellor and President, Deakin University, Australia
- Prof. Loyiso Nongxa, Vice-chancellor and Principal University of the Witwatersrand
- Prof. Mamokgethi Phakeng, Vice-chancellor of the University of Cape Town, mathematics education researcher and academic.* Max Price, Vice-Chancellor, University of Cape Town, Johannesburg; former dean, Faculty of Health Sciences, University of the Witwatersrand
- Mark Mostert Professor of Special Education at Regent University author and lecturer on Eugenics, Facilitated Communication and "useless eaters"
- Meyer Feldberg, dean of Columbia Business School 1989-2004; president of the Illinois Institute of Technology 1987-1989
- Michael Stevenson, President and Vice-Chancellor, Simon Fraser University, Burnaby, BC
- Patrick Deane, Principal of Queen's University, Canada
- Peter Sarnak, awarded the Wolf Prize 2014, Honorary doctorate 2014: University of the Witwatersrand
- Prof Tshilidzi Marwala, Rector of the United Nations University, former Vice-chancellor and Principal University of Johannesburg

== Engineering ==
- John Burland, is an Emeritus Professor and Senior Research Investigator at the Department of Civil and Environmental Engineering of Imperial College London.[2]
- Sir John Lazar (engineer), is a British investor, engineer and businessman 1 who was appointed as president of the Royal Academy of Engineering in 2024.[2]3
- Lewis Wolpert, was a South African-born British developmental biologist, author, and broadcaster
- Michael Bear (lord mayor), is a civil engineer and management leader in both the construction and property industries in the UK and abroad
- Rob Pullen, major contributor to the practice of water resources engineering and especially to the wider engineering profession in South Africa
- Matthew Rabinowitz, is a doctor of engineering and co-founder and executive chairman of Natera, a clinical genetic testing company
- Sir Jack Zunz, was a British civil engineer and former chairman of Ove Arup & Partners. He was the principal structural designer of the Sydney Opera House
- Trevor Wadley, was a South African electrical engineer, best known for his development of the Wadley Loop circuit for greater stability in communications receivers and the Tellurometer, a land surveying device.
- Jules Fejer was an engineer with South Africa's National Institute for Telecommunications Research (NITR), He published the first estimate of the life expectancy of the recently launched Sputnik in Nature.
- Malcolm McCulloch was a professor of Engineering at the University of Oxford, researching and teaching in the fields of Sustainable Energy, Transport and Energy for Development.

== Historians ==
- C. I. Hamilton, British naval historian
- Cornelis de Kiewiet
- Nthabiseng Mokoena, Lesotho's only female professional archaeologist
- Bruce Murray
- Charles van Onselen
- Charles Hilliard Feinstein

== Legal profession ==
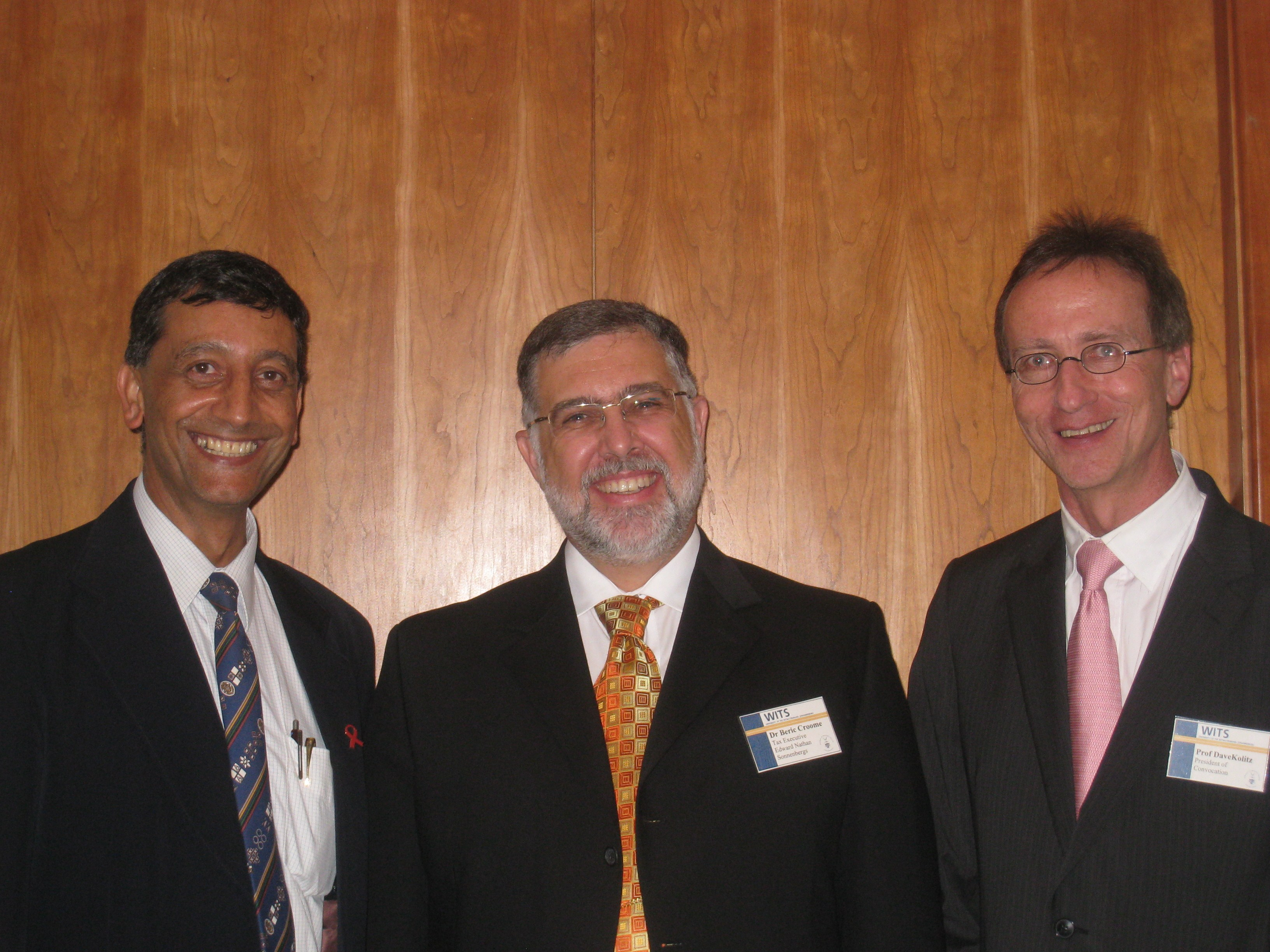
4 May 2009: Beric Croome was keynote speaker for the University of the Witwatersrand (Wits) graduation ceremony for the students of the Faculty of Commerce, Law and Management. Photograph shows from left to right: Acting Vice-Chancellor Y. Ballim; Beric Croome; David Kolitz, President of the Convocation of the University of the Witwatersrand.

- Michael Arnheim (1944–), London Barrister and author
- George Bizos (1927–2020), human rights advocate, represented Nelson Mandela during the Rivonia Trial
- Amina Cachalia (1930–2013), anti-Apartheid activist, women's rights activist, and politician
- Arthur Chaskalson (1931–2012), President of the Constitutional Court of South Africa and Chief Justice of South Africa
- Azhar Cachalia (1956– ), Judge at the South African Supreme Court of Appeal; anti-apartheid activist; a founding member of the United Democratic Front; served as Secretary for Safety and Security
- Beric John Croome (1960–2019), Advocate of the High Court of South Africa; CA (SA); taxpayers' rights legal pioneer; completed a Higher Diploma in Tax Law (cum laude) at Wits in 1989; awarded the Edward Nathan Friedland Tax Prize for the year; 2002 nominee for the University's Convocation Honour Award for his contribution to commerce and industry
- John Dugard (1936– ), professor of international law and writer
- Richard Goldstone (1938– ), judge and international war crimes prosecutor; considered one of several liberal judges who issued key rulings that systematically undermined Apartheid
- Anthony Gubbay (1932– ), Chief Justice of the Supreme Court of Zimbabwe
- Nicholas Haysom (1952– ), diplomat and UN official; Chief Legal Adviser to President Nelson Mandela; until May 1994, an associate professor of law and deputy director at the Centre for Applied Legal Studies (CALS) at Wits
- Bob Hepple (1934–2015), legal academic and leader in the fields of labour law, equality and human rights
- Joel Joffe, Baron Joffe (1932–2017), lawyer and peer in the House of Lords; defence attorney for the leadership of the African National Congress at the Rivonia Trial
- Sydney Kentridge (1922– ), advocate and Acting Justice of the Constitutional Court
- Dikgang Moseneke (1947– ), Chancellor of the University of the Witwatersrand and Deputy Chief Justice of South Africa
- Mervyn E. King (1937– ), former Justice of the Supreme Court of South Africa and director of the Global Reporting Initiative
- Jody Kollapen (1957– ), Justice of the Constitutional Court of South Africa, former commissioner of the South African Human Rights Commission, and former head of Lawyers for Human Rights
- Thuli Madonsela (1962– ), advocate, professor of law, and former Public Protector of South Africa
- Ismail Mahomed (1931–2000), appointed to the Constitutional Court in 1994; was made Chief Justice in 1998, a position he held until his death in 2000
- Bheki Maphalala, Chief Justice of the Supreme Court of the Kingdom of Eswatini
- Dennis Pavlich, Professor of Law at the University of British Columbia
- Margaret H. Marshall (1944– ), Chief Justice of the Massachusetts Supreme Judicial Court
- Lazar Sidelsky (1911-2002), Attorney that hired and mentored Nelson Mandela
- Michael Sutherland (1954– ), Australian politician and former Speaker of the Western Australian Legislative Assembly
- Nomatemba Tambo, diplomat, politician, and High Commissioner of South Africa to the United Kingdom
- Charles Theodore Te Water, Honorary Doctor of Law (1955)
- I. India Thusi, Law professor at Indiana University Bloomington
- Johan D. van der Vyver, I.T. Cohen Professor of International Law and Human Rights at Emory University School of Law, formerly a professor of law at Wits

== Medicine ==
- Alan Menter (MBBCh, 1966, Wits), dermatologist; expert on psoriasis; Chairman of the Division of Dermatology; Director of the Dermatology Residency program for Baylor University Medical Center; Clinical Professor of Dermatology at the University of Texas Southwestern Medical School
- Basil Hirschowitz, inventor of the first fiberoptic endoscope
- Catherine Nyongesa, radiation oncologist
- Glenda Gray, President of the South African Medical Research Council, pediatrician
- Helen Rees, is a medical doctor, and the founder and Executive Director of Wits RHI
- Irma Brenman Pick, psychoanalyst
- Jack Penn, known for his innovative techniques in plastic surgery, notably the Brenthurst splint
- James Ware, surgeon
- John Brereton Barlow - Barlow's syndrome
- Jonathan Lewis, surgical oncologist; biomedical researcher; developer of cancer drugs
- Joseph Sonnabend, physician, scientist and HIV/AIDS researcher, notable for pioneering community-based research, the propagation of safe sex to prevent infection, and an early multifactorial model of AIDS.
- Julien Hoffman, paediatric cardiologist; cardiac physiologist; expert in the epidemiology of congenital cardiovascular malformations
- Lars Georg Svensson, cardiac surgeon
- Lionel Hersov, child psychiatrist, researcher and academic
- Mary Malahlela, first black woman doctor in South Africa
- Martin Israel, pathologist
- Nandipha Magudumana, medical practitioner and celebrity doctor incarcerated and investigated for aiding a fugitive's prison escape
- Norman E. Rosenthal, author, psychiatrist and scientist who in the 1980s first described seasonal affective disorder (SAD), and pioneered the use of light therapy for its treatment
- Nthatho Harrison Motlana, activist, academic, businessman, Mandela family physician
- Phillip Tobias, palaeoanthropologist and Professor Emeritus at the University of the Witwatersrand in Johannesburg; known for his work at South Africa's hominid fossil sites; anti-apartheid activist
- Priscilla Kincaid-Smith, "the mother of nephrology", appointed Commander of The Order of the British Empire (Civil) in 1975, for services to medicine; appointed a Companion of the Order of Australia; first woman to become President of the Royal Australasian College of Physicians (1986–1988); won Australian Achiever Award in 1997 for a lifetime's work in renal health
- Raymond Dart, Dean of the Faculty of Medicine, 1925-1943, the longest term of service in that capacity; announced the discovery of the Taung skull, the first of Africa's early hominids, and named the species Australopithecus Africanus
- Rhian Touyz, MBBCh, MSc (Med), PhD, FRCP, FRSE,[1] FMedSci, FCAHS[2] is a Canadian researcher
- Salome Maswime, obstetrician-gynecologist, global health expert and activist
- Saul Levin, U.S.-based psychiatrist
- Selig Percy Amoils, Inventor of the Cryoprobe, recipient of the silver Order of Mapungubwe in 2006
- Shereen Usdin, public health specialist
- Sir Terence English, cardiac surgeon who performed the first successful heart transplant in the UK in 1979
- Sydney Brenner, biologist; 2002 Nobel laureate in Physiology or Medicine, shared with H. Robert Horvitz and John Sulston
- Sylvia Weir, pioneered the use of robotics in autism therapy
- William Harding le Riche, epidemiologist; established the first non-segregated health centre in Knysna
- Aaron I. Vinik, physician-scientist known for advanced research on diabetes

== Politics and public service ==
- Nelson Mandela, South Africa's first democratically elected president, Nobel Peace Prize winner
- Athol Williams, state capture whistleblower and anti-corruption advocate
- Ishtar Lakhani, feminist activist
- Achille Mbembe, philosopher and political scientist, staff member at Wits Institute for Social and Economic Research
- Adrian Guelke, political scientist
- Alan David Hoffmann, Director General of the Jewish Agency for Israel
- Ahmed Kathrada, politician, anti-apartheid activist and political prisoner
- Barbara Hogan, Minister of Public Enterprises in the Cabinet of South Africa; former Minister of Health
- Baron Joel Joffe, human rights lawyer who represented Nelson Mandela in the Rivonia Trial
- Bernard Friedman, senior lecturer in otolaryngology; founder of the Progressive Party
- Connie Mulder, former politician
- Dennis Brutus, former political activist and poet
- Dion George, politician
- Eduardo Mondlane, father of Mozambican independence
- Essop Pahad, anti-apartheid activist and politician
- Geoff Makhubo, mayor of the City of Johannesburg
- Gwede Mantashe, politician; ANC secretary general and chairperson of the South African Communist Party
- Harry Schwarz, lawyer, politician, ambassador to United States and anti-apartheid leader
- Helen Suzman, anti-apartheid activist and member of Parliament
- Helen Zille, leader of the Democratic Alliance
- Jan Hofmeyr, politician
- Jef Valkeniers, doctor and politician
- Joe Slovo, Communist politician; long-time leader of the South African Communist Party; leading member of the African National Congress
- John Matisonn, political journalist and author
- Lucien van der Walt, sociologist and co-author, along with Michael Schmidt, of Black Flame: The Revolutionary Class Politics of Anarchism and Syndicalism (Counter-Power vol. 1)
- Lulama Xingwana, politician
- Mamphela Ramphele, academic, businesswoman, medical doctor and anti-apartheid activist
- Mmusi Maimane, politician and former DA leader
- Natan Gamedze, Swazi Prince, Supreme Court Translator and Orthodox rabbi
- Regina Twala, political activist and the first Black woman to graduate from the university
- Robert Sobukwe, political dissident; founded the Pan Africanist Congress in opposition to the apartheid regime
- Rupert Taylor, political scientist
- Ruth First, anti-apartheid activist and scholar
- Sir Michael Bear, former Lord Mayor of London 2010/11
- Solly Malatsi, spokesperson of the DA
- Teresa Heinz Kerry, philanthropist, wife of U.S. Senator John Kerry
- Thulas Nxesi, Minister of Public Works
- Thuli Madonsela, Public Protector of South Africa
- Tony Leon, politician and former leader of the Democratic Alliance
- Tshilidzi Marwala, academic, businessman and political theorist
- Vivienne Thom, Australian former public servant and current independent consultant and intelligence specialist
- Winnie Madikizela-Mandela, Political activist during apartheid.
- Teeko Tozay Yorlay, Liberian diplomat

== Science and technology ==
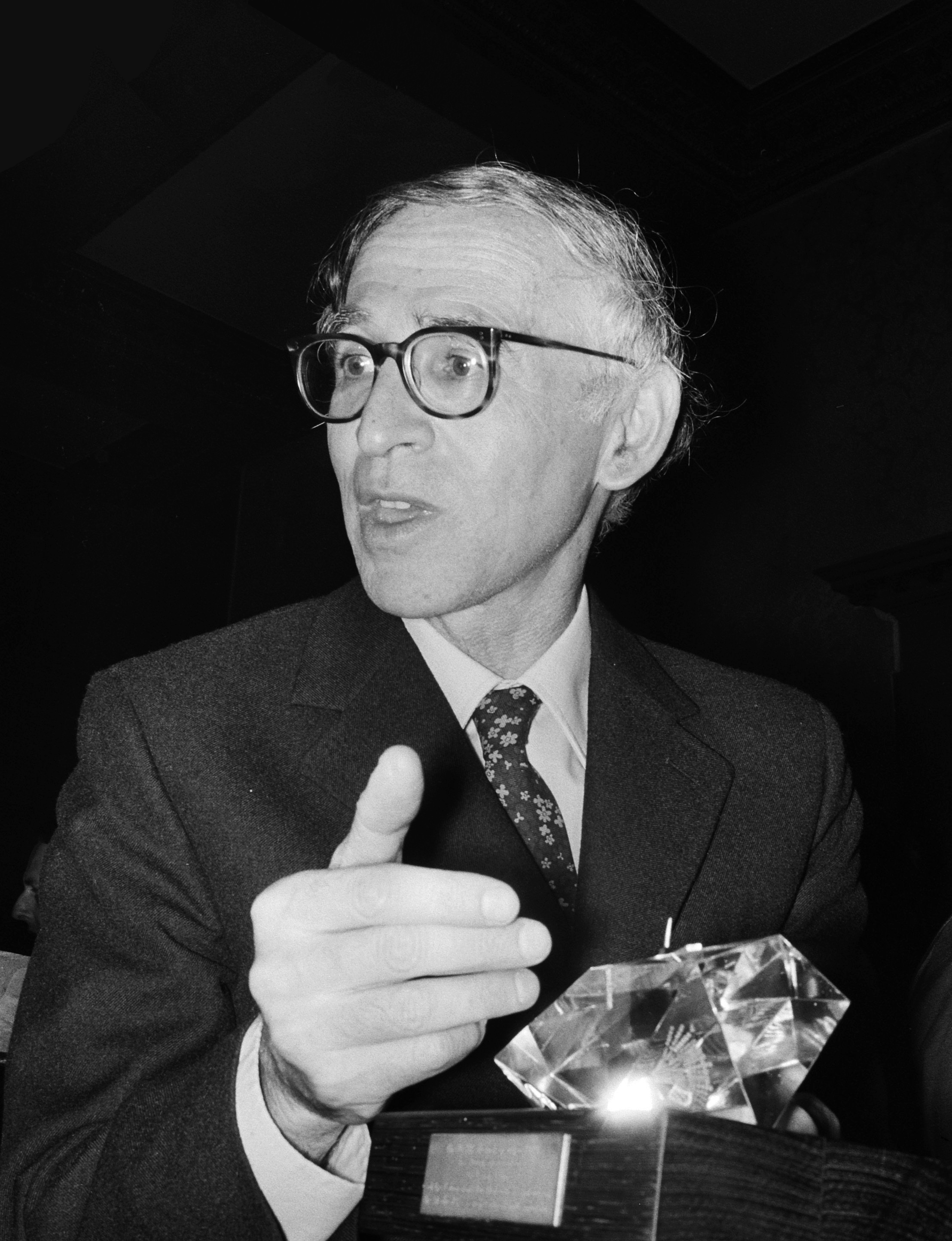
Sir Aaron Klug, winner of the Nobel Prize in Chemistry 1982

- Lucinda Backwell, paleoanthropologist
- Aaron Klug, Nobel Prize in Chemistry, 1982
- Arthur Bleksley, Professor of Applied Mathematics and astronomer
- Danie G. Krige, mining engineer who pioneered the field of geostatistics
- David Forsyth, computer vision researcher at University of Illinois Urbana-Champaign
- D. G. M. Wood-Gush, was a South African-born animal geneticist and ethologist
- David King, chemist, academic, head of the Climate Crisis Advisory Group
- John Edmund Kerrich, first head of the statistics department; famous for experiments in probability performed while interned in WW2
- David Lewis-Williams, Professor emeritus of Cognitive Archaeology at the University of the Witwatersrand; founder of the Rock Art Research Institute at the University of the Witwatersrand
- David Pettifor, physicist
- Doris Kuhlmann-Wilsdorf, known for her work in materials science
- Bernie Fanaroff, physicist and Project Director at South African Square Kilometre Array Project
- Frank Nabarro, solid state physicist, DVC
- Friedel Sellschop, physicist
- H. J. De Blij, geographer, professor, television personality, analyst
- Helen Nissenbaum, scholar of online privacy and security; professor of information science at Cornell Tech
- Herbert Sichel, statistician
- Himla Soodyall, geneticist
- James Kitching, Karooo paleontologist
- Jan C. A. Boeyens, chemist
- John Burland, Emeritus Professor at the Department of Civil and Environmental Engineering of Imperial College London
- Kim Man Lui, software engineer
- Lee Berger, paleoanthropologist, winner of the first National Geographic Prize for Research and Exploration
- Lewis Wolpert, graduated in Civil Engineering; popular science lecturer and writer
- Marlene Behrmann, cognitive neuroscientist, professor at Carnegie Mellon University
- Peter Sarnak, mathematician, head of School of Mathematics at Princeton
- Phillip Tobias, paleoanthropologist and anatomist
- Raymond Dart, anatomist and anthropologist; discoverer of the Taung Child
- Ron Clarke, paleoanthropologist
- Beric Skews scientist, faculty member
- Selig Percy Amoils, ophthalmologist and biomedical engineering inventor
- Seymour Papert, artificial intelligence pioneer and inventor of the Logo programming language
- Sir Basil Schonland, founding director of the Bernard Price Institute of Geophysics at the university
- Tingye Li, pioneer in lasers and optical communication
- Wanda Orlikowski, information systems scholar
- Susan Shore (scientist), audiologist and innovator
- Frank Talbot (1930–2024), ichthyologist; BSc. 1949; former director of the Australian Museum

== Social Sciences ==
- Audrey Richards, social anthropologist
- David Webster, social anthropologist and anti-apartheid activist
- Deborah James, anthropologist
- Ellen Hellmann, social anthropologist
- John Blacking, ethnomusicologist and social anthropologist
- Max Gluckman, anthropologist
- Robin Cohen, social scientist

== Sports ==
- Ali Bacher, former Test cricketer and an administrator of the United Cricket Board of South Africa
- Gary Bailey, football (played for England)
- Hugh Baiocchi, golfer
- Gordon Day, sprinter
- Colin Dowdeswell, tennis player
- Bruce Fordyce, marathon and ultramarathon athlete who won the Comrades Marathon a record nine times (eight times consecutively)
- Chick Henderson, rugby union footballer and commentator
- Ian Holding, squash
- Stephen Jack, cricket
- Joe Kaminer, rugby
- Syd Levy (born 1922), tennis player; competed at Wimbledon, the French Championships, the U.S. Open, and Davis Cup, and won a silver medal at the Maccabiah Games
- George Mallory, first South African to summit Mount Everest (in the footsteps of his grandfather, of the same name)
- Alan Menter, chosen for the Springbok rugby team in 1968
- Paul Nash, sprinter
- Mark Plaatjes, marathon runner
- Hendrik Ramaala, winner of the 2004 New York City Marathon and 2004 Mumbai Marathon; has two silver medals from the IAAF World Half Marathon Championships in 1998 and 1999; in 2006 he won the men's Great North Run; two-time national champion in the 5.000 metres
- Odette Richard, gymnastics
- Wilf Rosenberg, rugby
- Richard Snell, cricketer
- Mandy Yachad, former cricketer and field hockey player who represented the South African national team in both sports

== Miscellaneous ==
- Akiva Tatz, rabbi, medical ethicist, author and orator
- Cedric Phatudi
- Giles Henderson, CBE, Master of Pembroke College, Oxford
- Imran Garda, news anchor for Al Jazeera English.
- Jonathan Drummond-Webb
- Ken Costa, Chairman of Alpha International
- Sheila Lapinsky, anti-apartheid and LGBTQ+ activist
- Thabo Makgoba, South African Anglican Archbishop of Cape Town
- David Lopato, Chartered accountant, psychic and spiritual medium - president of the Society for Psychic Advancement, Johannesburg from 1961.

== See also ==
- List of vice-chancellors and chancellors of the University of the Witwatersrand
