= History of the Jews in Eswatini =

The Location of Eswatini in Africa

The history of the Jews of Eswatini, formerly Swaziland.

== Modern times ==
Figures from 2017 Eswatini official census suggested that there are an estimated 163 Jews in the country.

Before and during the Holocaust, Swaziland, as Eswatini was then called, welcomed a large group of German Jewish refugees who lived there for a few years.

In 2002, Swaziland's prime minister, Barnabas Dlamini, said the country appreciates the contribution of its Jewish community: "The Jewish community is small, numbering in the tens rather than hundreds, but over the years it has had quite an influence on the development of our country, the names Kirsh and Goldblatt will be remembered long after their time" referring to two well-known Jewish Swazi entrepreneurs. Kalman Goldblatt who later changed his name to Kal Grant came from Lithuania and built his wealth through several trading stores and by developing the first townships in the country.

In 2019 there is an estimated Jewish community of about 50 to 60 people. Eswatini/Swazi Jews have played an important role in the business and legal sectors of the economy. The community consists of Israelis, South African Jews, and descendants of World War II refugees. Some Holocaust survivors settled in Swaziland. Jews have experienced hardly any anti-Semitism. A notable Jew was Stanley Sapire, Chief Justice of the Swazi Court of Appeal.

The Jewish community, headed by Geoff Ramokgadi in 2024, is affiliated with the African Jewish Congress which is based in South Africa and advocates on behalf of the small and scattered communities of sub-Sahara Africa. It works to ensure that the Jewish community of Eswatini has international representation.

In 2024 Prime Minister Russell Mmiso Dlamini invited Jewish investors to come and invest in Eswatini. He extended this invitation during a meeting with the American Jewish Committee in New York.

== Ties with Israel ==
Eswatini has had official uninterrupted diplomatic ties and relations with Israel since 1968 soon after Eswatini gained full independence from Great Britain.Foreign relations of Israel#Diplomatic relations

In 1978 Premier Maphevu Dlamini paid a state visit to Israel he was also the foreign minister and army commander and was accompanied by the Ministers of Finance and Justice and other top officials and will be hosted by Premier Menachem Begin and Foreign Minister Moshe Dayan and with Finance Minister Simcha Ehrlich.

In 1979 Premier Maphevu Dlamini and Premier Menachem Begin of Israel signed a treaty of cooperation providing for stepped-up Israeli technological assistance to Eswatini.

In 2012 Israeli and Jewish leaders were received by the King of Eswatini when the Israeli Ambassador Dov Segev-Steinberg presented his credentials to King Mswati III at his official palace. The ambassador was accompanied by Rabbi Moshe Silberhaft, spiritual leader of the African Jewish Congress. Rabbi Silberhaft later inspected the two Jewish cemeteries in Eswatini.

In 2017 Israeli Prime Minister Benjamin Netanyahu and his Swazi counterpart, Prime Minister Dr Barnabas Sibusiso Dlamini (1942–2018) accompanied by his Agriculture Minister, Moses Vilakati met in Jerusalem. Netanyahu expressed his appreciation for Swazi King Mswati III's warm regards and ongoing admiration for Israel.

In 2024 there was speculation that Israel would re-open a full embassy in Mbabane the capital of Eswatini, closed since 1994 and then based in South Africa, as a response to neighboring South Africa's deteriorating relations with Israel.

== Notable people ==
=== Natan Gamedze ===
Rabbi Natan Gamedze (born 1963, Swaziland, since 2018 renamed to Eswatini) is a Haredi rabbi and lecturer. Born to the royal lineage of the Gamedze clan of the Kingdom of Swaziland, he converted to Judaism, received rabbinic ordination, and now lectures to Jewish audiences all over the world with his personal story as to how an African prince became a Black Haredi Jewish rabbi.

=== Nathan Kirsh ===
Nathan Kirsh (born 6 January 1932) is a South African/Swazi/Eswatini billionaire businessman. He heads the Kirsh Group, which holds a majority stake in New York cash and carry operation Jetro Holdings, owner of Restaurant Depot and Jetro Cash & Carry. The Group also holds equity and investments in Australia, Swaziland (now Eswatini), the UK, the US, and Israel. Bloomberg estimated his wealth at $6.09 billion in March 2019, ranking him at #267 on its "Billionaires Index". He was also listed on the UK's Sunday Times Rich List 2018, and was named as the wealthiest person in Eswatini by Forbes.

== See also ==
- History of the Jews in Africa

=== Regions: ===
- History of the Jews in Central Africa
- History of the Jews in East Africa
- History of the Jews in North Africa
- History of the Jews in Southern Africa
- History of the Jews in West Africa

=== Topics: ===
- Religion in Eswatini
- History of Eswatini
