= List of University of Johannesburg people =

This is an incomplete list of notable alumni and faculty (past and present) of the University of Johannesburg including notable people from the merger of the Rand Afrikaans University (RAU), the Technikon Witwatersrand (TWR) and Vista University into the University of Johannesburg.

== Alumni ==
=== Athletes ===
Name	Class year	Notability	References
Lisa-Marie Deetlefs	N/A	South African Olympic field hockey player	
Zaid Timol	N/A	South African rugby player who plays for the Lions	
Uzair Docrat	N/A	South African basketball player	
Thornton McDade	N/A	South African Olympic field hockey player	
Caylib Oosthuizen	N/A	South African rugby player for the Tel Aviv Heat	
Shireen Sapiro	N/A	South African Paralympic swimmer	
Micheen Thornycroft	N/A	Zimbabwean Olympic rower	
Francois Uys	N/A	South African rugby player who plays for the Free State Cheetahs	
Irvette van Zyl	N/A	South African Olympic long-distance runner	
Walter Venter	N/A	Former South African rugby player who represented the Golden Lions, Leopards, Falcons, Griquas and the Lions	
Jano Vermaak	N/A	South African national rugby player	
Adel Weir	N/A	South African squash player	

=== Business ===
Name	Class year	Notability	References
Zibusiso Mkhwanazi	2005	Entrepreneur	
Bridget van Kralingen	1985	Senior Vice President of IBM Global Business Services	
Lizelle Bisschoff		Founder of the Africa in Motion (AiM) film festival in Scotland	

=== Politics ===
Name	Year	Notability	Reference
Joseph Kabila	2019	Former President of the Democratic Republic of Congo	

== Faculty ==
Name	Class year	Field of expertise	Academic level	Notability	References
Nicolaas Johannes Diederichs	N/A	Economics	Doctorate (Ph.D.)	First chancellor of the Rand Afrikaans University and Minister of Finance of South Africa (1967–1975)	
Farid Esack	N/A	Religion	Professor	Islamic studies	
Hendrik C. Ferreira	N/A	Engineering	Professor	NRF "A-rated" researcher specialising in Communication technologies, Information systems and technologies, Electronic engineering, Applied mathematics, Communication technologies & Information systems and technologies	
Adam Habib	N/A	Political Science	Professor	Former deputy Vice Chancellor	
Tshilidzi Marwala	N/A	Engineering	Professor	Known for extensive contributions to the field of mechanical engineering; received the Order of Mapungubwe in Bronze for outstanding contributions to, and inspirational achievements in, the field of engineering science	
Gerrit Viljoen	N/A	Classical literature & Philosophy	Masters	First vice-chancellor of the Rand Afrikaans University, Minister of Education in South Africa (1980–1989), and Minister of Constitutional Development (1989–1992)	

== Honorary doctorates ==
The university may confer advanced degrees, including an honorary doctoral degree honoris causa as an academic award in any faculty. The university follows a conservative awards policy in order to emphasise the extraordinary and inherent value of the honorary doctorate.

Name	Doctorate field	Year awarded	Notability	References
Richard Goldstone	Law	2010	Former Constitutional Court judge	
Richard Maponya	Management	2010	Businessman	
Willem Boshoff	Fine Arts	2010	South African artist	
Aung San Suu Kyi	Literature	2011	Nobel Peace laureate	
Barack Obama	Law	2013	44th president of the United States	
Kees Schouhamer Immink	Engineering	2014	Digital pioneer	
Barbara Masekela	Humanities	2025	Poet, academic and diplomat	
Margaret Busby	Humanities	2025	Publisher	
