= Realistic DX-300 =

Shortwave radio receiver

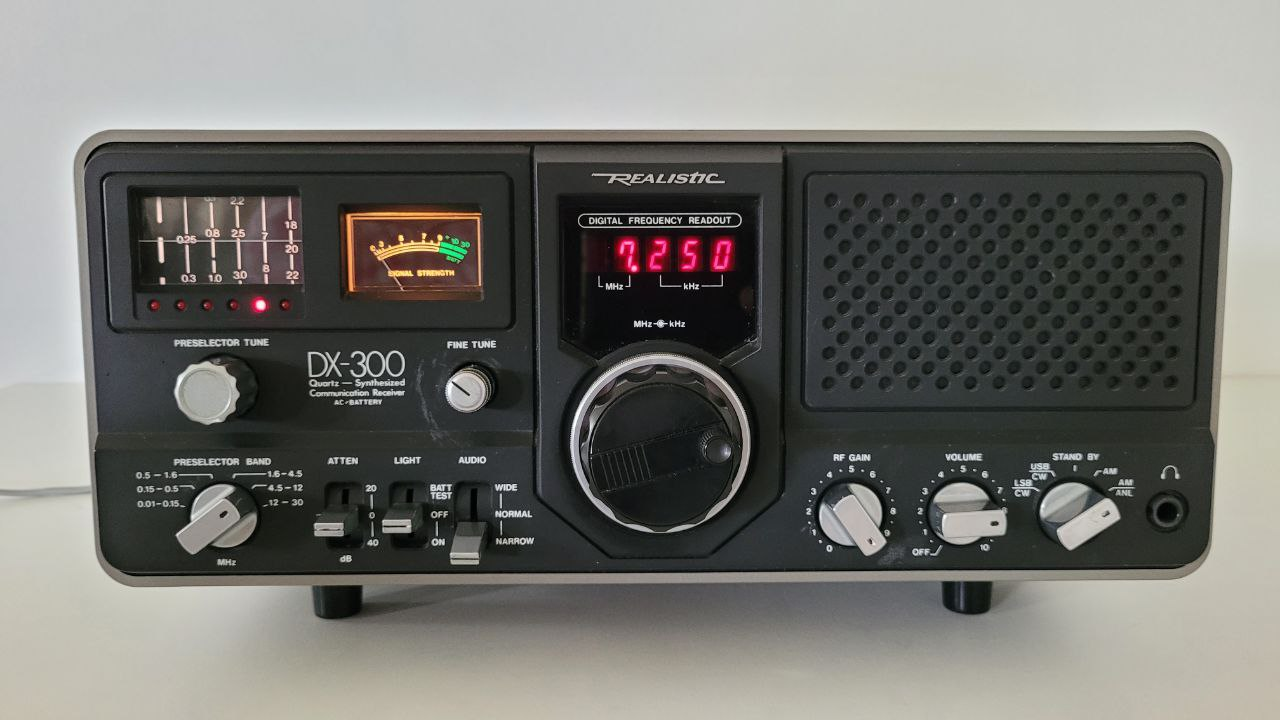
Picture of the front of a Realistic DX 300 HF receiver in operation

The Realistic DX-300 is a shortwave radio manufactured by General Research of Electronics (GRE) of Chiba, Japan and marketed in the United States by Radio Shack (Tandy Corporation) from late 1978 through 1979. The radio's theory of operation is based on the principle of the Wadley Loop and was one of the first radios marketed by Tandy Corporation to have a digital frequency display. The DX-300 was succeeded by the improved DX-302 in 1980.

== History ==
The Realistic DX-300 was developed during a period when consumer shortwave receivers were transitioning from purely analog tuning to digital frequency displays.General Research of Electronics (GRE), the manufacturer, was a Japanese electronics company known for producing radio equipment for various brands. Radio Shack, the marketing arm in the United States, positioned the DX-300 as an affordable entry into shortwave listening for hobbyists. In 1980, the Realistic DX-300 was succeeded by the improved DX-302, which addressed some of the earlier model's shortcomings in selectivity and build quality.

== Design ==
The receiver's core technology is based on the Wadley Loop, a drift-cancelling circuit design that provides frequency stability across its tuning range. The DX-300 covers 10 kHz to 30 MHz continuously, allowing reception of longwave, mediumwave (AM broadcast), and shortwave bands. It supports AM, single-sideband (SSB), and CW (Morse code) modes. The five-digit, 7-segment LED display was a notable feature for a consumer-grade receiver of the late 1970s, although the tuning mechanism itself remained analog.

== Reception ==
Hobbyist reviews indicate the DX-300 performs adequately once warmed up, though it is known to drift during initial operation. The audio output is often described as harsh, and the radio lacks an effective noise blanker, making it susceptible to impulse noise. Some users have noted that the controls can feel wobbly and the tuning is sensitive.

== In popular culture ==
- In the 1983 James Bond movie Never Say Never Again, the Sprectre agent Kovacs uses a Realistic DX-300 radio to contact Maximilian Largo from the spy trawler radio room.
