= Timeline of the Kivu conflict (2020) =

This a timeline of the Kivu conflict during 2020.

== January ==
- 1 January - An Nduma Defense of Congo-Renovated (NDC-R) fighter shot and killed a 40-year-old man in Kituruku village in Walikale territory.
- 3 January - The National Coalition of the People for the Sovereignty of Congo (CNPSC) ambushed the Ngumino and Twiganeho in Ibumba village in Fizi territory. Overall in the attack six Ngumino and Twiganeho fighters were killed, and one CNPSC fighter was killed and three wounded. The Ngumino were also attacked in the villages of Rubibi, Rubarati, and Kanogo in Uvira territory by the Mai-Mai Biloze Bishambuke. The Mai-Mai Biloze Bishambuke captured all of those villages from them.
- 5 January - The (RDF) attacked National Resistance Council for Democracy (CNRD) fighters in Muuzi village in Mwenga territory. Two CNRD fighters were captured and 16 CNRD fighters were killed.
- 7 January - The RDF attacked CNRD fighters in Nyabaleke village in Mwenga territory. Two CNRD fighters were captured and two CNRD dependants were killed in the attack. Two weapons were recovered by the RDF.
- 8 January - Five unidentified armed men raided a house in Kakombe neighbourhood in rural Uvira. The attackers kidnapped a woman.
- 9 January - Five Raia Mutomboki Walike members raided Kiseku village in Shabunda territory and looted money, four solar panels, three goats, eight chickens, two sacks of cassava flour and other goods. They also kidnapped twenty people who they forced to carry the goods. The Mai-Mai Kyandenga clashed with the FARDC in Visiki, Beni territory resulting in one Kyandengan death. Unidentified armed men in Mahya, Masisi territory resisted an attack by the FARDC.
- 10 January - The Mai-Mai Ebu Ela ambushed the Ngumino and Twiganeho near Kahwela village in Fizi territory. The attack resulted in the death of a 16-year-old boy who was shot dead. The Mai-Mai Ebu Ela also set fire to houses and looted livestock in the villages of Kahwela, Kivumu, and Misinji. In the village of Kalungu in Mwenga territory, RDF forces attacked the National Forces of Liberation (FNL).
- 11 January - The RDF attacked CNRD fighters in Kasika village in Mwenga territory. 20 CNRD dependants died in the attack.
- 13 January - The Congolese army raided Allied Democratic Forces's (ADF) headquarters camp, nicknamed "Madina", which is located near Beni. 30 Congolese soldiers were killed and 70 were wounded in the intense battle with ADF. 40 ADF insurgents were also reported killed, including five top commanders. The Congolese army nevertheless captures the camp, but failed to apprehend the target of the raid, ADF leader Musa Baluku. The FARDC also attacked the Mai-Mai Malaika and the Raia Mutomboki Jean Musumbu in Kalabula village in Shabunda territory. The FARDC kicked out the Mai-Mai Malaika and the Raia Mutomboki Jean Musumbu from Kalabula. Overall in the attack, four FARDC soldiers were killed, and six Mai-Mai Malaika and Raia Mutomboki Jean Musumbu fighters were captured. Six AK47 weapons were recovered, and the perpetrators looted ten goats and five solar panels.
- 14 January - The FARDC recaptured the village of Katale, Kalehe territory from the Nyatura Kalume.
- 16 January - Unidentified armed men raided Mikanda village in Mwenga territory. The attackers raped four women, kidnapped two men and wounded three others. They also looted money and goods.
- 17 January - Unidentified armed captured the head nurse from a health centre and tried to capture the guard. The kidnappers demanded a ransom of $1,000 for the hostage's release.
- 19 January - The NDC-R captured the village of Hembe, Masisi territory from the Alliance of Patriots for a Free and Sovereign Congo (APCLS) and Nyatura APRDC. Four APCLS fighters and two men were killed in the attack.
- 20 January - Unidentified armed looted 62 cows in Nakanango village in Uvira territory only to be attacked by the army. In total, the army was able to free 60 of the cows.
- 22 January - 6 civilians were killed in an ADF attack in the Beni territory. The NDC-R attacked the Nyatura Domi under the Collective of movements for change (CMC) and the FDLR-FOCA in the villages of Mukaka, Kinyamugenzi, and Bumbasha, Rutshuru territory. The Nyatura Domi and the FDLR-FOCA resisted the attack by NDC-R. The NDC-R killed eighteen people when they were returning to Katsiru.
- 24 January - APCLS fighters captured the village of Ndurumo, Masisi territory from NDC-R.
- 25 January - The Mai-Mai Kashumba attacked the Ngumino in Kahololo village in Uvira territory and killed seven Ngumino fighters.
- 26 January - The Mai-Mai Biloze Bishambuke attacked the Ngumino and Twiganeho in the villages of Kinyuni, Kajembwe, Kagogo, Mugete, Masata, Kahuna, Irangi, and Masroro in Uvira territory. Houses, a health centre and schools were burnt down in the attack. The Mai-Mai Biloze Bishambuke also looted cows.
- 27 January - A Mai-Mai Kifuafua Delphin Mbaenda militant killed a 38-year-old man in Nyamimba village in Walikale territory.
- 28 January - ADF militants hack 38 civilians to death with machetes in Oicha. Down in South Kivu the Mai-Mai Biloze Bishambuke raided Mitamba village in Uvira territory. The attackers set houses and market stalls on fire. They also looted cows. Following a misunderstanding the Mai-Mai FPP Kabido clashed with one another in Masumo, Lubero territory.
- 29 January - ADF killed 3 civilians and a soldier in the villages of Malonga and Pikamaibo, Beni territory. The ADF attacked a FARDC position in Mayi-Moya, Beni territory. The FARDC supported by MONUSCO repelled the attackers. The attack resulted in the destruction of ten houses by mortars. The FARDC attacked the Raia Mutomboki Lukoba in Tugoka, Kabare territory.
- 30 January - ADF militants kill 21 civilians in three separate attacks on Oicha, Ache, and Mandumbi. In a different attack, unidentified gunmen shot and killed two boys aged 16 and 17 in a field in Rusankuku village in Mwenga territory. The ADF also killed one soldier and six civilians in Mamove village, Beni territory. The ADF later clashed with the FARDC in Mbau locality, Beni territory.

== February ==
- 3 February - The Nyatura Jean-Marie attacked the NDC-R in Kitso, Masisi territory. Five men, five women and four children were killed in the attack.
- 6 February - Unidentified armed men attacked the ADF near Mulobya, Beni territory and killed one ADF fighter. NDC-R attacked APCLS and Nyatura APRDC fighters in Karumu, Masisi territory. One APCLS fighter and another man were killed in the attack.
- 7 February - 8 civilians were killed in an ADF attack in the Beni territory. The Mai-Mai Simba under the command of Mangalibi ambushed the FARDC near Egombo, Lubero territory. An FARDC soldier was wounded in the attack.
- 9 February - 60 ADF fighters attacked the village of Makeke, North Kivu, and killed seven people. 40 of them were later captured by the FARDC. Down in South Kivu the Ngumino raided Musika village in territory. The attackers wounded two men and set fire to four houses. The Mai-Mai Ebu Ela later chased them out of the village. The Mai-Mai FPP Kabido killed two policemen and stole two AK47 weapons. APCLS fighters supported by the Nyatura Domi Under the CMC attacked the NDC-R in Bushimoo, Masisi territory. APCLS fighters attacked the NDC-R in Mashango, Masisi territory. Ten NDC Guidon fighters, four women and one child were killed in the attack.
- 10 February - NDC-R captured the village of Mumo from APCLS and Nyatura-APRDC fighters in Masisi territory. Two women were killed in the attack. The ADF attacked the FARDC in Linzo, Beni territory. The attackers were fought off and one FARDC soldier died. The FARDC attacked the Mai-Mai Mazembe in the Buleusa, Walikale territory. One man was shot and wounded in the attack. NDC-R kicked APCLS and Nyatura APRDC out of Mumo, Masisi territory and killed two women.
- 11 February - The ADF raided Mbau locality, Beni territory. The FARDC retaliated by attacking them. The FARDC then chased the attackers away. APCLS fighters attacked the NDC-R in Kinumbi, Masisi territory. 8 APCLS fighters and 5 civilians were killed in the attack.
- 12 February - The FDLR-RUD attacked the FARDC who were investigating the situation following a shooting near Katwiguru locality, Rutshuru territory. The FARDC kicked the FDLR-RUD out of the village.
- 14 February - The FARDC recaptured the village of Kiyeye, Rutshuru territory from Nyatura Domi under the CMC. One civilian was killed and one wounded in the attack. The Raia Mutomboki Lance Muteya attacked the FARDC in Mutale, Kalehe territory. One FARDC was killed and three Raia Mutomboki wounded in the attack.
- 16 February - The Nyatura Domi under the CMC attacked the NDC-R in Kamudoka, Rutshuru territory. A woman was killed and a man was wounded in the attack.
- 17 February - Five civilians were taken hostage by the ADF and found murdered near Virunga National Park. The ADF raided Halungupa, Beni territory and killed one FARDC soldier and 10 civilians. They also set fire to four motorbikes and ten houses. The Nyatura Domi under the CMC alliance raided Malemo, Walikale territory and killed one of two NDC-R fighters who were passing through the village.
- 18 February - APCLS combatants attacked the NDC-R in Nyabiondo locality, Masisi territory and killed a man.
- 20 February - Unidentified armed men ambushed an FARDC convoy carrying soldiers' salary near Rwaza, Rutshuru territory. Seven FARDC soldiers and one man were killed in the ambush. The attackers stole $117,647.
- 21 February - The ADF ambushed a FARDC jeep carrying ammunition and food to the Ngadi neighbourhood, Beni. Two FARDC and two ADF fighters were killed. One FARDC fighter was also wounded. The APCLS and Nyatura APRDC repelled an attack by NDC-R in Kivuye, Masisi territory. NDC-R attacked APCLS fighters in the villages of Buhiri, Hembe, Kosovo, and Bukere, Masisi territory.
- 24 February - The Ngumino and Twiganeho attacked the Mai-Mai Biloze Bishambuke in Biziba village in Uvira territory. The Mai-Mai Biloze Bishambuke repelled the attack by Ngumino and Twiganeho.
- 26 February - The ADF attacked the FARDC at KP 25 on the Mbau-Kamango axis in Beni territory. The FARDC repelled the attackers.

== March ==
- 19 March - The Ngumino raided Bigaragara village in Fizi territory. The Mai-Mai Biloze Bishambuke retaliated by chasing the Ngumino out of the village. The FARDC intervened to break up the two armed groups. The Mai-Mai Charles under the command of Je t'aime recruited more than one hundred and three children in the villages of Kisharo, Buramba and Nyamilima in Rutshuru territory.
- 30 March - A skirmish between the ADF and FARDC left two civilians and one Congolese soldier dead. After the skirmish the ADF was forced to release 38 civilian hostages.

== April ==
- 6 April - The NDC-R attacked APCLS and Nyatura APRDC fighters in Bukucha village in Masisi territory. The APCLS and the Nyatura APRDC fighters repelled the NDC-R. One NDC-R fighter was killed and another wounded in the attack.

== May ==
- 24 May - The Twiganeho supported by the Ngumino attacked the FARDC in the villages of Kakenge, Kalongi, Kabingo, and Madegu, Fizi territory. 21 FARDC soldiers were killed and three were wounded in the attack. 7 Twiganeho and Ngumino militants were wounded. One woman was also wounded.
