= Realistic DX-302 =

The Realistic DX-302 is a general coverage (long-wave, medium-wave, and short-wave) radio manufactured by General Research of Electronics (GRE) of Chiba, Japan and marketed in the United States by Radio Shack (Tandy Corporation) from 1980 through 1982. The radio's theory of operation is based on the principle of the Wadley Loop tuner (developed by Trevor Wadley in the 1960s), and was one of the first radios marketed by Tandy Corporation to have a digital frequency display. The DX-302 succeeded and improved upon the similar Realistic DX-300.

The frequency range is from 10 kHz to 30 MHz. The Reception Modes are AM, LSB, USB, and CW.
