= Tayo Oviosu =

Nigerian-American Entrepreneur

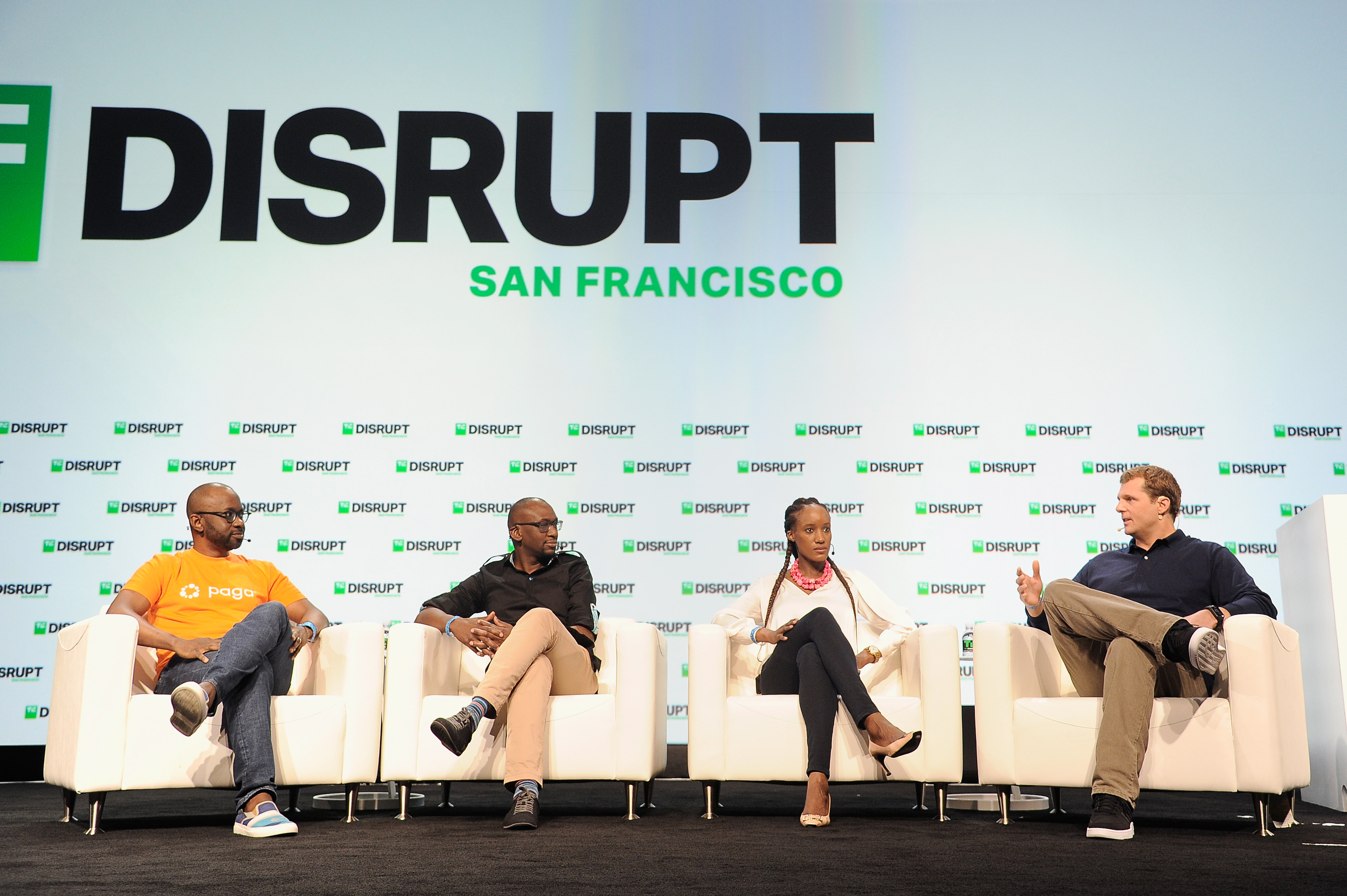
- Oviosu far left in 2018
- Born: Eyitayo David Oviosu; September 10, 1977; 48 years ago Lagos State
- Education: Electrical and Electronics Engineering, University of Southern California; Master's degree in Business Administration, Graduate School of Business, Stanford University.
- Occupation: Entrepreneur
- Years active: 2009–present
- Known for: Founder and Group CEO of Paga
- Title: Group CEO of Paga
- Spouse: Affiong Williams (m. 2014)
- Website: paga.com

Tayo Oviosu is a Nigerian-American businessman who is the founder and group CEO of Paga, a mobile payments company that is focused on digitizing cash in emerging economies. Nigeria is Paga's first market.

== Education ==
Oviosu is a graduate of Electrical and Electronics Engineering from the University of Southern California. He also has a master's degree in Business Administration from the Graduate School of Business, Stanford University in 2005. Eyitayo Oviosu is from Edo State by origin, he obtained a master's degree in Business Administration from the Graduate School of Business, Stanford University. He formerly served as Manager Corporate Development at Cisco Systems in San Jose California and was vice president at Travant Capital Partners in Lagos, Nigeria until 2009, when he started Paga where he is currently the Group Chief Executive Officer.

== Career ==
After graduating from USC, Oviosu started his career at Biomorphic VLSI as a Semiconductor Chip Design Engineer and then Event 411 as a Software Engineer, all based in Los Angeles California.

He later went to work for Deloitte Consulting in the CRM and Technology practice as a Senior Consultant. After business school he joined Cisco Systems in San Jose California where he was responsible for strategy, acquisitions and private equity investments in a few segments and helped lead Cisco's investment expansion in Africa with investment opportunities. He led investments and acquisitions which include the $130m acquisition of Reactivity and investment in Guardium (Database Security, Series C, sold to IBM). In 2008, he returned to Nigeria where he joined Travant Capital Partners and served as vice president.

In 2009, he founded Paga to address the use of cash and expand financial access. Tayo Oviosu has also co-founded Kairos Angels, who partners with visionary entrepreneurs to build scalable and sustainable businesses.

== Personal life ==
Eyitayo Oviosu is from Edo State, born in Lagos by Ora, Edo State father and mother from Kogi State. He is married to an Efik woman from Cross River State, Nigeria. Affiong Williams in 2014.
