= Nathan Kirsh =

South African and Swazi businessman

Natie Kirsh
- Born: 6 January 1932 (age 94); Potchefstroom, South Africa
- Education: Potchefstroom High School for Boys; University of the Witwatersrand
- Occupations: Businessman, property developer, philanthropist
- Spouse: Frances Herr
- Children: 3

Nathan "Natie" Kirsh (born 6 January 1932) is a Swazi and South African billionaire businessman and philanthropist. He heads the Kirsh Group, which holds a majority stake in New York state cash and carry operation Jetro Holdings, owner of Restaurant Depot and Jetro Cash & Carry. The Group also has investments in Australia, Eswatini, the UK, the US, and Israel. He lives in Eswatini, and has residency in the UK and the US.

Forbes estimated his wealth at US$17.6 billion in April 2026. He was also listed on the UK's Sunday Times Rich List 2018, and the wealthiest person in Eswatini by Forbes.

== Early life and education ==
Nathan "Natie" Kirsh was born on 6 January 1932 to Jewish parents who immigrated to South Africa from Lithuania, and he grew up in Potchefstroom. He later matriculated from Potchefstroom Boys High, in 1949. He encountered little antisemitism in Potchefstroom: "It was a very comfortable and good environment to grow up in." He also joined the Labor Zionist youth movement Habonim Dror. He earned a Bachelor of Commerce at the University of the Witwatersrand, in 1952. He also holds an honorary doctorate from the University of Swaziland.

== Career ==
In 1952, Kirsh began assisting his mother with the operation of his father's original malt factory in Potchefstroom, then, in 1958, launched his own first venture, founding a corn milling and malt business in Eswatini.

After having returned to South Africa, in 1968; in 1970, Kirsh acquired Moshal Gevisser, a South African wholesale food distributor with a pilot cash and carry program. At the time, the South African apartheid government prevented white business-owners from operating in black townships, and Kirsh began using Moshal Gevisser to supply goods to black shopkeepers. As a cash and carry business, Moshal Gevisser became a dominant food retailer in South Africa.

In June 1976, he founded Jetro, a cash and carry store in Brooklyn, New York. He acquired Restaurant Depot in 1994, then opened its first New York retail outlet in 1995, and Jetro and Restaurant Depot began operating as sister businesses under Jetro Holdings. In 2003, Warren Buffett agreed to buy a minority share of Jetro Holdings, however, he and Kirsh could not agree on terms. As of August 2018, Kirsh owned 75 percent of Jetro Holdings, which had about 115 Jetro Cash & Carry and Restaurant Depot stores in the United States. That year, the Independent reported that several of Kirsh's companies were registered in the British Virgin Islands and in Liberia, both of which are listed on the Organisation for Economic Co-operation and Development's tax haven "grey list". Kirsh Holdings Group, Kirsh's primary holding group, continues to own half of Swazi Plaza Properties.

In the late 1970s, he also acquired Magal Security Systems from Israel Aerospace Industries, listing the company on Nasdaq in 1993. In 2009, Kirsh was a director and held a 24.2 percent stake in Magal Security, which met controversy by providing fences in Israel. In 2014, Kirsh sold his 40 percent stake in Magal to FIMI.

Kirsh left South Africa in 1986, after selling much of Kirsh Industries to Sanlam, In 2006, his companies included Mira Mag and Ki Corporation. Through Kifin Limited, part of Ki Corporation, by 2008, he also held a stake in Minerva, dropping a bid for majority ownership in 2010.

By early 2018, Kirsh retained retail and property interests in Britain, the United States, Australia, and Eswatini.

In March 2026, Sysco contracted to acquire Jetro Restaurant Depot LLC, for $29.1 billion, including debt, with its shareholders to receive over 14 times its operating income, as $21.6 billion in cash, together with 91.5 million shares, representing about 16% of Sysco's stock. Jetro reported $2.1 billion in earnings from $16 billion in revenue in 2025, and is expected to change ownership within a year.

== Personal life ==
Kirsh is married to Frances Herr, and they have three children. They reside in Ezulwini, in Eswatini, where he holds citizenship. He keeps kosher but does not consider himself religious. His brother, Issie, founded Radio 702 and Primedia.

== Philanthropy ==
He established the Kirsh Foundation, an international charitable organization. He has contributed significantly to Eswatini, primarily through the financing of small business startups and computer education in high schools. Between 2001 and 2016, his foundation funded 14,000 startups, with a 70% success rate. Its projects include a microfinance venture in collaboration with Swazi chiefs to provide "affordable loans and financial literacy training to Swazi women." By 2015, around 20,000 people were employed by small-scale businesses started by the fund. In 2021, Kirsh funded a mission for humanitarian NGO IsraAID to aid with the COVID-19 vaccine rollout in Swaziland.

In recent years the fund has also focused on financing business startups and computer education in high schools and yeshivas in Israel. Through the Natan fund, 700 startups had been financed as of 2016, with an 85% success rate. The Kirsh family also donated $10 million to the Jerusalem Arts Campus, a new downtown campus for the Nisan Nativ Acting Studio, the Sam Spiegel Film and Television School, and the School of Visual Theater and the Center for Middle Eastern Music. His foundation has also funded the Britain Israel Research and Academic Exchange Partnership, an initiative of the British Council and the British Embassy in Israel, together with the Pears Foundation, investing in world-leading research jointly undertaken by scientists in Britain and Israel. He also supports the Jewish People Policy Institute, a think tank with the purpose of promoting and securing the Jewish people and Israel. His foundation also spearheaded Shine A Light, an initiative to raise awareness about modern antisemitism through education, community partnerships, workplace engagement and advocacy in the United States. It is endorsed by the Anti-Defamation League.

In 2020, Kirsh donated $8.8 million to his alma mater, the University of the Witwatersrand in Johannesburg.

== See also ==
- History of the Jews in Eswatini
- History of the Jews in South Africa
- History of the Jews in Southern Africa
