= Ionosonde =

Radar for the ionosphere

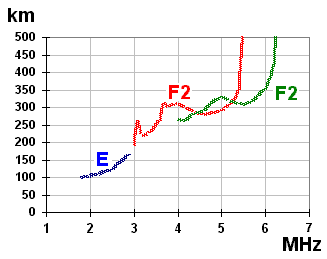
Typical ionogram indicating an F2 layer critical frequency (foF2) of approximately 5.45 MHz.

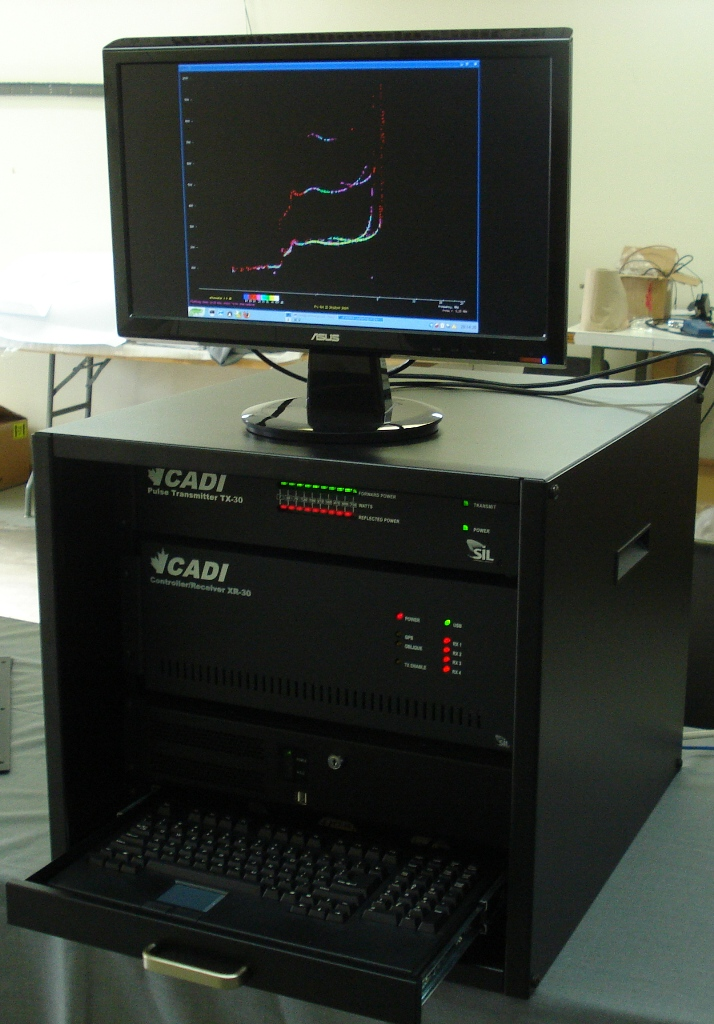
An example of an ionosonde system displaying an ionogram

An ionosonde, or chirpsounder, is a special radar for the examination of the ionosphere. The basic ionosonde technology was invented in 1925 by Gregory Breit and Merle A. Tuve and further developed in the late 1920s by a number of prominent physicists, including Edward Victor Appleton. The term ionosphere and hence, the etymology of its derivatives, was proposed by Robert Watson-Watt.

== Components ==
An ionosonde consists of:

- A high frequency (HF) radio transmitter, automatically tunable over a wide range. Typically the frequency coverage is 0.5–23 MHz or 1–40 MHz, though normally sweeps are confined to approximately 1.6–12 MHz.
- A tracking HF receiver which can automatically track the frequency of the transmitter.
- An antenna with a suitable radiation pattern, which transmits well vertically upwards and is efficient over the whole frequency range used.
- Digital control and data analysis circuits.

The transmitter sweeps all or part of the HF frequency range, transmitting short pulses. These pulses are reflected at various layers of the ionosphere, at heights of 100–400 km (62–249 mi), and their echos are received by the receiver and analyzed by the control system. The result is displayed in the form of an ionogram, a graph of reflection height (actually time between transmission and reception of pulse) versus carrier frequency.

An ionosonde is used for finding the optimum operation frequencies for broadcasts or two-way communications in the high frequency range.

== Ionogram ==
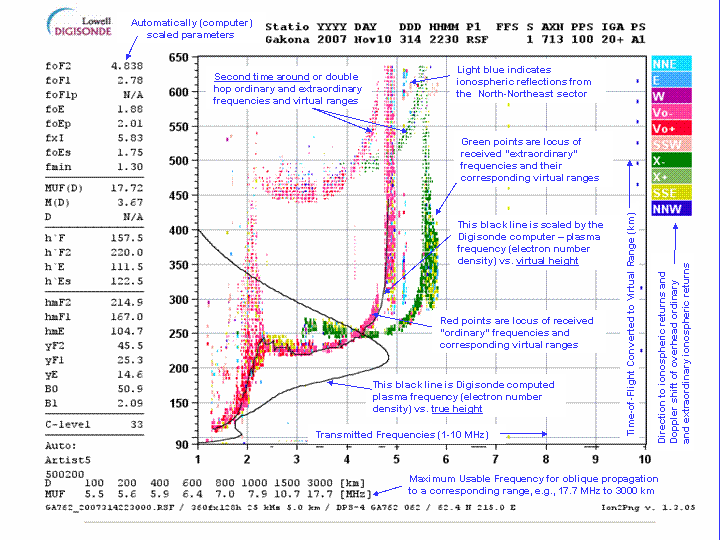

An ionogram is a display of the data produced by an ionosonde; technically speaking one may call the data used to make the display as the ionogram but often this is simply implied. It is a graph of the virtual height of the ionosphere plotted against frequency. Ionograms are often converted into electron density profiles. Data from ionograms may be used to measure changes in the Earth's ionosphere due to space weather events.

Note that in the ionogram above the legend can be more clearly understood as having "Vx-" and "Vx+" to replace respectively "X-" and "X+". These refer to the vertical reflection of the eXtraordinary kind. "Vo-" and "Vo+" refer to the Ordinary reflection. An Ordinarily reflected wave is the one that behaves as though there were no geomagnetic field.

ARTIST is the software program used to "scale" (deduce or calculate) the characteristic parameter values shown in the table on the left. The version shown here is "5", which is the latest as of March 2022. Ion2Png is the software program used to create the ionogram image.

== Chirp transmitter ==
A chirp transmitter is a shortwave radio transmitter that sweeps the HF radio spectrum on a regular schedule. If one is monitoring a specific frequency, then a chirp is heard (in CW or SSB mode) when the signal passes through. In addition to their use in probing ionospheric properties, these transmitters are also used for over-the-horizon radar systems.

An analysis of existing transmitters has been done using SDR technology. For better identification of chirp transmitters the following notation is used: <repetition rate (s)>:<chirp offset (s)>, where the repetition rate is the time between two sweeps in seconds and the chirp offset is the time of the first sweep from 0 MHz after a full hour in seconds. If the initial frequency is greater than 0 MHz, the offset time can be linearly extrapolated to 0 MHz.

== List of ionosonde sites ==
Station	Country	Lat (°)	Lon (°)	URSI code	Earliest data
ALMATY	Kazakhstan	43.1800	76.9500	AA343	2025-12-11
ALPENA	United States of America	45.0700	-83.5600	AL945	2014-04-11
ASCENSION ISLAND	British Overseas Territory	-7.9500	-14.4000	AS00Q	1997-03-22
ATHENS	Greece	38.0000	23.5000	AT138	2002-01-15
AUSTIN	United States of America	30.4000	-97.7000	AU930	1999-08-23
AWASE	Japan	26.3200	127.8400	AW426	2023-09-08
BAHIA BLANCA	Argentina	38.7000	62.3000	BBJ3R	2016-10-07
BELEM	Brazil	1.4300	-48.4400	BLJ03	2017-11-07
BOA VISTA	Brazil	2.8000	-60.7000	BVJ03	2002-10-05
BRISBANE	Australia	-27.0600	153.0600	BR52P	2015-03-17
CACHOEIRA PAULISTA	Brazil	-22.7000	-45.0000	CAJ2M	2000-07-14
CAMPO GRANDE	Brazil	-20.5000	-55.0000	CGK21	2002-09-17
CANBERRA	Australia	-35.3200	149.0000	CB53N	2015-03-17
COCOS_ISLAND	Indian Ocean Ter.	-12.1800	96.8300	CS31K	2015-03-17
DARWIN	Australia	-12.4500	130.9500	DW41K	2015-03-17
DOURBES	Belgium	50.1000	4.6000	DB049	2001-01-01
EARECKSON	United States of America	52.7300	-174.0800	EA653	2018-08-17
EGLIN AFB	United States of America	30.5000	-86.5000	EG931	1999-12-31
EIELSON	United States of America	64.6600	-147.0700	EI764	2006-01-01
EL ARENOSILLO	United States of America	37.1000	-6.7000	EA036	2000-04-17
FAIRFORD	United States of America	51.7000	-1.5000	FF051	2000-03-25
GAKONA	United States of America	62.3800	-145.0000	GA762	1998-10-03
GIBILMANNA	Italy	37.9000	14.0000	GM037	2009-04-27
GRAHAMSTOWN	South Africa	-33.3000	26.5000	GR13L	1996-04-12
HERMANUS	South Africa	-34.4200	19.2200	HE13N	2008-07-04
HOBART	Australia	-42.9200	147.3200	HO54K	2015-03-17
I-CHEON	South Korea	37.1400	127.5400	IC437	2010-06-06
IDAHO NATIONAL LAB	United States of America	43.8100	-112.6800	IF843	2013-02-19
JEJU	South Korea	33.4300	126.3000	JJ433	2009-01-05
JICAMARCA	Peru	-12.0000	-76.8000	JI91J	1993-07-20
JULIUSRUH	Germany	54.6000	13.4000	JR055	2001-01-01
LAJES TERCEIRA ISLAND	Portugal	38.7700	-27.0900	LAA38	2024-06-11
LEARMONTH	Australia	-21.8000	114.1000	LM42B	1999-12-31
LOUISVALE	South Africa	-28.5000	21.2000	LV12P	2000-08-17
LUALUALEI	USA (Hawaii)	21.4300	-158.1500	LL721	2015-11-25
MALINDI	Kenya	-3.1000	40.7000	ML10L	2025-08-18
MILLSTONE HILL	United States of America	42.6000	-71.5000	MHJ45	1992-03-20
NICOSIA	Cyprus	35.0300	33.1600	NI135	2008-09-17
NIUE	Niue	-19.0700	-169.9300	ND61R	2015-03-17
PERTH	Australia	-32.0000	116.1300	PE43K	2015-03-17
POKER FLAT	Russia	65.1300	-147.4500	PF765	2020-05-07
PRUHONICE	Czechia	50.0000	14.6000	PQ052	2004-01-20
PT ARGUELLO	United States of America	34.8000	-120.5000	PA836	1998-05-07
ROME	Italy	41.8000	12.5000	RM041	2004-11-25
ROME	Italy	41.9000	12.5000	RO041	1997-06-07
ROQUETES	Spain	40.8000	0.5000	EB040	1988-06-06
SAN VITO	Italy	40.6000	17.8000	VT139	2000-08-02
SAOLUIS	Brazil	-2.6000	-44.2000	SAA0K	1997-01-19
SOPRON	Hungary	47.6300	16.7200	SO148	2018-06-25
THULE	Greenland	76.5400	-68.4400	THJ76	2019-08-17
TOWNSVILLE	Australia	-19.6300	146.8500	TV51R	2015-03-17
TROLL	Antarctica	-72.0100	2.5300	TR0P2	2025-02-07
TROMSO	Norway	69.6000	19.2000	TR169	1993-07-01
WAKE	U.S. Minor Outlying Is.	19.2900	166.6500	WA619	2019-09-09
AHMEDABAD	India	23.0000	72.5000	AH223	2012-06-05
AL DHAFRA AFB	United Arab Emirates	24.2400	54.5800	DH224	2022-03-06
ANYANG	South Korea	37.3900	126.9500	AN438	1998-05-01
BEIJING	China	40.3000	116.2000	BP440	2010-10-07
BERMUDA	United States of America	32.4000	-64.7000	BJJ32	2000-01-01
BOULDER	United States of America	40.0000	-105.3000	BC840	1999-08-22
BUNDOORA	Australia	-37.7000	145.0500	BV53Q	2002-01-15
CACHIMBO	Brazil	-9.5000	-54.8000	CXM9B	2002-09-28
CAMDEN	Australia	-34.0500	150.6700	CN53L	2015-03-17
CHERRY	United States of America	32.9000	-106.4100	CH833	2014-01-15
CHILTON	United Kingdom	51.5000	-0.6000	RL052	1996-12-16
CHUNG-LI	Taiwan	25.0000	121.2000	CL424	1996-02-21
COLLEGE AK	United States of America	64.9000	-148.0000	CO764	1999-12-31
COLORADO SPRINGS	United States of America	39.0000	-104.8800	CS839	2008-12-22
DYESS AFB	United States of America	32.4000	-99.8000	DS932	1999-12-31
EISCAT TROMSO	Norway	69.5800	19.2200	TR170	2017-04-05
ELEKTROUGLI	Russia	55.7600	38.2800	MO156	2015-03-17
FORTALEZA	Brazil	-3.9000	-38.4000	FZA0M	2001-03-22
GADANKI	India	13.4600	79.1700	GA313	2015-04-16
GOOSE BAY	United States of America	53.3000	-60.3000	GSJ53	1995-04-18
GUAM	Guam	13.6200	144.8600	GU513	2009-01-01
HAINAN	China	19.4000	109.0000	HA419	2002-03-24
HANSCOM AFB	United States of America	42.5000	-71.3000	HAJ43	1997-03-22
IDAHO NATIONAL LAB	United States of America	43.8100	-112.6800	AC843	2012-01-25
ILORIN	Nigeria	8.5000	4.5000	IL008	2010-03-26
IRKUTSK	Russia	52.4000	104.3000	IR352	2002-11-30
JANG BOGO	Antarctica	-74.6200	164.2400	JB57N	2017-02-16
KALININGRAD	Russia	54.3600	20.1200	KL154	2015-03-17
KENT IS	United States of America	38.9600	-76.2800	KI939	2018-07-11
KHABAROVSK	Russia	47.5200	134.7700	KB547	2016-01-12
KING SALMON	United States of America	58.4000	-156.4000	KS759	1999-12-31
KIRTLAND	United States of America	35.0000	-106.5300	KR835	2014-01-02
KIRUNA SWEDEN	Sweden	67.8600	20.4300	KI167	2018-01-30
KOKUBUNJI	Japan	35.7000	139.5000	TO535	2001-10-30
KWAJALEIN	Marshall Is.	9.0000	167.2000	KJ609	1999-11-17
LAVERTON	Australia	-28.3000	122.8000	LA42Q	2008-03-04
MADIMBO	South Africa	-22.3900	30.8800	MU12K	2000-01-01
MAGADAN	Russia	60.0900	150.9300	MA560	2015-03-17
MELROSE	United States of America	29.7100	-82.0000	ME929	2014-07-16
MISAWA	Japan	40.7100	141.3800	MI540	2023-10-23
MOHE	China	52.0000	122.5200	MH453	2013-08-27
MOSCOW	Russia	55.4900	37.2900	MA155	2015-03-17
MOSCOW	Russia	55.4700	37.3000	MO155	2008-10-26
MULTAN	Pakistan	33.0300	72.0100	MU230	2009-03-01
MUNYO	United States of America	33.5600	-106.6500	MU834	2014-01-14
NARSSARSSUAQ	Greenland	61.2000	-45.4000	NQJ61	2000-03-25
NORD GREENLAND	Greenland	81.4000	-17.5000	NDA81	2006-08-08
NORILSK	Russia	69.2000	88.0000	NO369	2002-12-06
NOVOSIBIRSK	Russia	55.0200	82.2100	NV355	2018-09-01
OKINAWA	Japan	26.6800	128.1500	OK426	2001-12-31
OLSZTYN	Poland	53.8000	20.5000	OL246	2014-05-02
OSAN AB	South Korea	37.1000	127.0000	SN437	1999-12-31
PETROPAVLOVSK	Russia	52.9700	158.2400	PK553	2015-11-22
PORT STANLEY	New Zealand	-51.6000	-57.9000	PSJ5J	1996-02-27
SAN JUAN	USA (Puerto Rico)	18.1100	-66.2500	SJJ18	2014-03-14
RAMEY	USA (Puerto Rico)	18.5000	-67.1000	PRJ18	1999-06-09
ROSTOV	Russia	47.2400	39.6300	RV149	2015-03-17
SALEKHARD	Russia	66.5100	66.6600	SH266	2015-03-17
SANTA MARIA	Fiji	-29.7300	-53.7100	SMK29	2017-04-13
SANYA	China	18.3400	109.4200	SA418	2013-08-17
SONDRESTROM	Greenland	66.9800	-50.9400	SMJ67	1989-10-27
SQUIRT	United States of America	32.4200	-106.2900	SQ832	2014-01-08
ST. PETERSBURG	Russia	60.0000	30.7000	LD160	2018-02-28
THULE/QAANAAQ	Greenland	77.5000	-69.2000	THJ77	1987-01-01
TRIVANDRUM	India	8.5400	76.8700	TM308	2009-02-03
TUCUMAN	Fiji	-26.9000	-65.4000	TUJ2O	2002-11-11
TUCUMAN AIS-INGV	Fiji	-26.9000	-65.4000	TNJ20	2014-03-01
TUNGUSKA	Russia	61.5800	90.0200	TZ362	2015-03-17
WALLOPS IS	United States of America	37.9000	-75.5000	WP937	1999-08-22
WALLOPS ISLAND	United States of America	37.9400	-75.5800	WI937	2014-01-09
WARSAW	Poland	52.2000	21.1000	MZ152	2012-04-19
WUHAN	China	30.5000	114.4000	WU430	2002-01-27
XINXIANG CHINA	China	35.3000	113.9200	XI434	2006-06-20
YAKUTSK	Russia	62.0000	129.6000	YA462	2002-11-29
ZHIGANSK	Russia	66.8000	123.4000	ZH466	2003-11-12
ZHONG SHAN	Antarctica	-69.4000	76.4000	ZS36R	2005-01-01

Map of ionosonde stations (GIRO/DIDB)

== See also ==
- Duga radar
- Ionosonde Juliusruh
- Incoherent scatter radar
- Radio propagation beacon
- Total electron content
- Trevor Wadley#Ionosonde
