= Juliusruh =

Village on the northeast German island of Rügen

Coordinates: 54°37′N 13°22′E

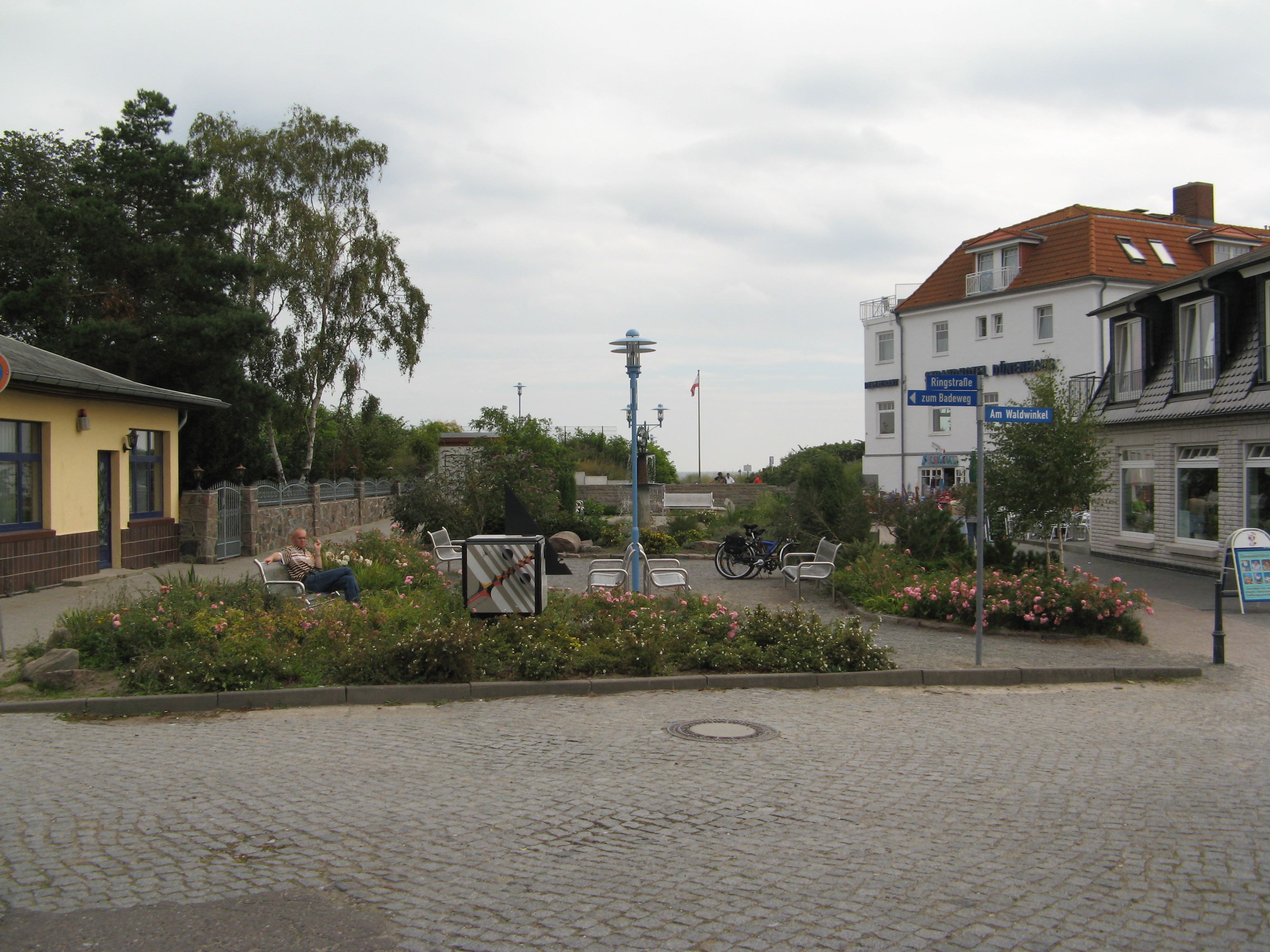
Juliusruh

Juliusruh is a village on the northern coast of the island of Rügen in northeastern Germany. Juliusruh is part of the municipality of Breege. Juliusruh and Breege combined have 821 inhabitants in an area of 15,99 km² (approx. 6 sq miles).

Tourism is Juliusruh's economic mainstay.

A facility for atmospheric research, the Ionosonde Juliusruh is located nearby.
