= Kitso =

Name list

Kitso is a South African given name. Notable people with the name include:

- Kitso Lynn Lelliott (born 1984), Motswana filmmaker and artist
- Kitso Masi (born 1984), Motswana actor
- Kitso Mokaila, ambassador for Botswana to the US
- Michael Kitso Dingake (1928 – 2024), Motswana political activist

== See also ==
- Kitsõ, a village in Estonia
