= Ionosonde Juliusruh =

German atmospheric physics facility

Coordinates: 54.62863°N 13.37433°E

The Ionosonde Juliusruh is a facility of the institute for atmospheric physics near Juliusruh in northeastern Germany for sounding the ionosphere with radar systems in the short wave range (frequencies between 1 MHz and 30 MHz). The landmark of the station is a 70 metre high grounded free standing steel framework tower, which was built in 1960/61 and which carries a cage aerial for the transmitter of the ionosonde.

== See also ==
- List of towers
