= Lazar Sidelsky =

South African lawyer

- Born: 7 October 1911; Johannesburg, Transvaal, Union of South Africa
- Died: 17 May 2002 (aged 90); Johannesburg
- Education: University of Witwatersrand
- Occupation: Attorney
- Known for: Apartheid-era employer of Nelson Mandela
- Spouse: Goldie Blume Sidelsky (m. 1952; died 2009)
- Children: 3

Lazar Sidelsky (7 October 1911 – 17 May 2002) was a South African lawyer. His firm, Witkin, Sidelsky and Eidelman, pioneered the advancement of black South Africans in the legal profession during the apartheid era. Sidelsky is known for having employed and mentored a young Nelson Mandela, a law clerk in his firm.

== Early life ==
Sidelsky was born in Johannesburg in 1911 to Lithuanian Jewish parents that had fled pogroms in their home country. His parents, Isaac Sidelsky and Rachel Sidelsky (née Rafel), purchased a farm in the eastern Transvaal highveld (now known as Mpumalanga). He attended high school in Ermelo, before studying law at the University of the Witwatersrand. Shortly before he began his university studies, his father died.

In order to fund his education, Sidelsky played the violin and performed with his jazz band, Connecticut Yankees. After daytime lectures were over, Sidelsky walked 10 miles to where his band performed nightly.

== Career and Mandela ==
By the 1940s, Sidelsky was a partner in one of Johannesburg's largest and most successful legal firms, Witkin, Sidelsky and Eidelman. Sidelsky spearheaded a credit programme allowing black South Africans to secure mortgages. As part of this stream of work, Sidelsky worked with a black real estate agent, Walter Sisulu. Sisulu recognised potential in Mandela and introduced him to Sidelsky in 1942. Sidelsky hired a 24-year-old Mandela as an articled clerk, allowing Mandela to qualify as an attorney. Mandela worked at the firm whilst pursuing a BA by correspondence and also while he undertook legal studies at the University of the Witwatersrand. At the practice, Mandela also worked alongside Sidelsky's cousin, Nat Bregman. Bregman was a member of the South African Communist Party and Mandela came to describe him as his "first white friend".

In 1953, Sidelsky lent Mandela the seed money to establish South Africa's first black-led law practice. In 1957, as a sign of respect to Sidelsky, the wedding procession of Mandela and his bride Winnie Madikizela, passed Sidelsky's home. Sidelsky also visited Mandela when the latter was imprisoned on Robben Island, with Mandela telling the guards: "You see this man — this is the only man I’m prepared to call my boss."

In his memoir, Long Walk to Freedom, Mandela said that Sidelsky had treated him with “enormous kindness” and reflected on the opportunity: “It was a Jewish firm, and in my experience I have found Jews to be more broad-minded than most whites on issues of race and politics, perhaps because they themselves have historically been victims of prejudice.”

In the 1990s, Mandela hosted a kosher lunch at his Houghton Estate home, in honour of his guests, Sidelsky and Bregman. In 2001, shortly before his death, Sidelsky attended an event organised by the South African press honouring Mr Mandela.

== Personal life ==
Sidelsky was married to Goldie Blume, with whom he had three children, Colin, Dov and Ruth. Colin lives in Johannesburg, with Ruth having emigrated to live in London, and Dov having made aliyah to Israel, where he is a rabbi.

Sidelsky died in May 2002, with Mandela paying a shiva visit to his relatives.
