= Lionel Hersov =

Professor Lionel Hersov (19 November 1922 – 11 March 2018) was a South African-born child psychiatrist at the Maudsley Hospital in London from 1968 to 1984. His research revealed new information about school truancy and the treatment of the "anxious child".

He qualified in medicine University of the Witwatersrand in 1948, his studies having been interrupted by World War II, in which he served as a medical orderly. He took psychiatric posts South Africa, then moved to London in 1952, to train at the Maudsley Hospital.

In 1984, be became professor of psychiatry and paediatrics at the University of Massachusetts Chan Medical School. He was senior editor of Journal of Child Psychology and Psychiatry for many years.

He returned to the UK in 1990, where be became Distinguished Visiting Scientist at the Tavistock and Portman NHS Trust.
