= Kay Yarms =

South African influencer (born 1994)

- Born: Khethokuhle Ngonyama; 5 April 1994 (age 32); Durban, KwaZulu-Natal, South Africa
- Education: University of the Witwatersrand
- Occupations: Influencer; content creator; YouTuber; entrepreneur
- Years active: 2018–present

Khethokuhle Ngonyama (5 April 1994) professionally known as Kay Yarms is a South African media personality, entrepreneur and YouTuber. She is best known for her beauty content and vloggs on YouTube. She is the founder of Saxx Beauty. In 2023, she appeared on the list of Forbes Africa 30 Under 30 class of 2023 for Forbes magazine.

== Career ==
Ngonyama began her career around 2018 by sharing simple makeup videos, beauty tips and lifestyle posts on Instagram and YouTube platforms. In 2020, she experienced her first major rise in popularity as her YouTube channel grew rapidly and earned her the YouTube Silver Play Button after surpassing 100,000 subscribers. Her online presence strengthened and she became widely recognised as one of the most reliable voices in the South African beauty space.

The year 2023 marked one of the biggest leaps in her career. She collaborated with MrPrice for Yarms x Scarlet Hill makeup, a full beauty line that sold widely across South Africa. She was honoured at the South African Social Media Awards as Social Media Influencer of the Year. In the same year, she was featured on the Forbes Africa 30 Under 30 list, highlighting her impact on the beauty industry and digital media. She launched a collaboration with Red Bull for Red Bull x Kay Yarms June Berry Summer edition.
