= Trevor Wadley =

South African electrical engineer

Trevor Lloyd Wadley
- Born: 1920; Durban
- Died: 21 May 1981 (Aged 61)
- Education: Howard College
- Engineering career
- Discipline: Electrical Engineering
- Employer: Council for Scientific and Industrial Research
- Projects: RADAR
- Significant design: Tellurometer, Wadley loop, ionosonde
- Awards: Frank P. Brown Medal

Trevor Lloyd Wadley (1920 – 21 May 1981) was a South African electrical engineer, best known for his development of the Wadley Loop circuit for greater stability in communications receivers and the Tellurometer, a land surveying device.

== Life and career ==
Wadley was born in 1920 in Durban, South Africa. His father was the Mayor of Durban and Trevor was one of 10 children. He attended Durban High School where he excelled in mathematics and science but was uninterested in any sport. The exception was one year when he entered the annual cross-country athletics event and predicted that he would win in record time and his record would stand for 15 years. He went on to do exactly as he had predicted. His training method involved calculating the time he needed to run each section of the course and then training himself to run at the required pace for each section.

He then went to Howard College (now the University of KwaZulu-Natal), where he studied under Hugh Clark and Eric Phillips, after which he completed his Thesis (D.Sc.) at the University of the Witwatersrand, Faculty of Science, 1959, Heterodyne techniques in specialised radio instrumentation . He had the habit of rarely, if ever, taking notes in lectures due to his near-eidetic memory. GR Bozzoli noted in is book Forging Ahead – South Africa’s Pioneering Engineers that Wadley "would very occasionally take out a small pocket notebook and write a word or two in it using a blunt, stubby pencil. His remarkable mind understood and remembered every item of a lecture".

In 1941, during World War II, he joined the Special Signals Services (SSS) of the South African Corps of Signals which was engaged in developing South Africa's own radar system based on the British experience which had been communicated to them. Wadley and other colleagues including Jules Fejer, the Hungarian-born mathematician, were trained on the British RADAR project. His association with Fejer would continue for many more years. Wadley was not keen on mathematics but Fejer proved each of Wadley's concepts mathematically.

In 1946, Wadley was employed as a designer of radio equipment and instrumentation in a special division of the Telecommunications Research Laboratory (TRL), created at the behest of Prime Minister Jan Smuts and located at the electrical engineering department of the University of the Witwatersrand (under Basil Schonland). The TRL relocated to the South African Council for Scientific and Industrial Research (CSIR) and was renamed the National Institute for Telecommunications Research (NITR) (under Dr Frank Hewitt).

In 1948, Wadley started working on an urgent project for the South African Chamber of Mines to provide a means of radio communication underground for rescue purposes. After a feasibility investigation Wadley wrote a report indicating that it could be done and detailing his recommendations. The Chamber did not pursue the matter for more than a decade.

Wadley retired in 1964 (aged 44) and lived on the south coast of KwaZulu-Natal until his death from cancer in 1981 (aged 61).

== Wadley loop ==
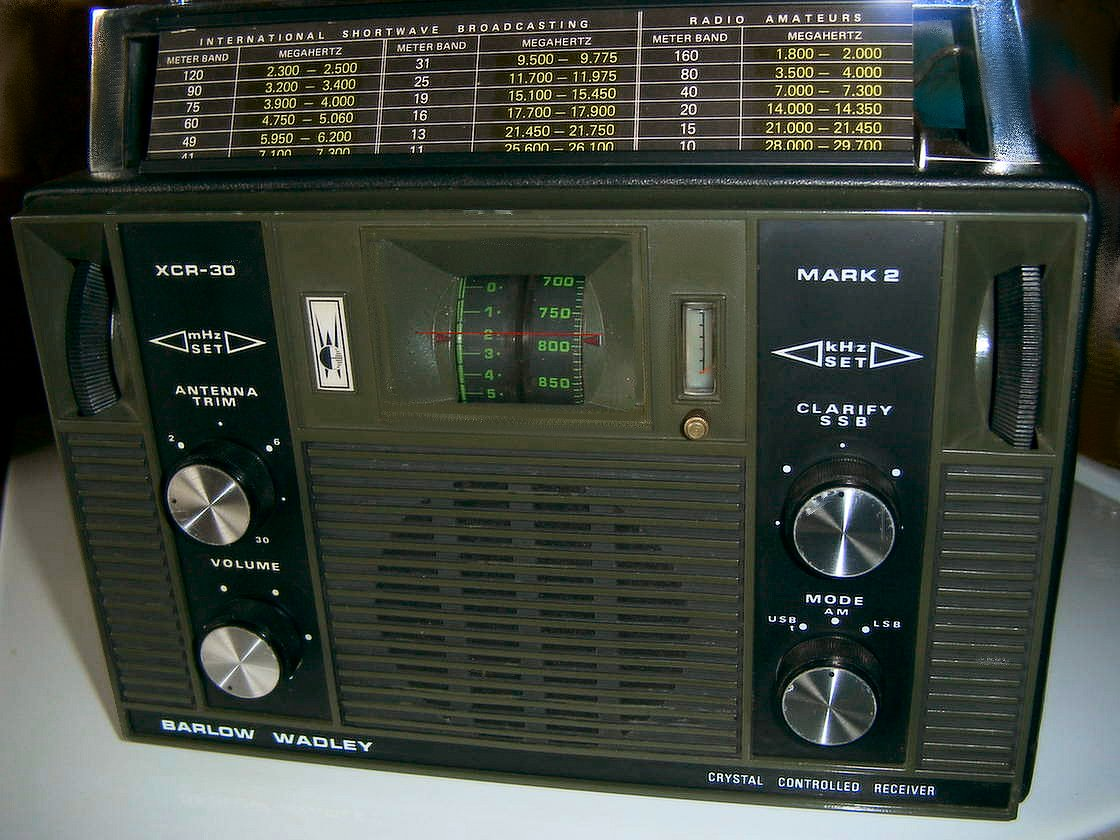
Wadley receiver (Barlow Wadley XCR-30)

It was in 1948 at the CSIR that Wadley invented the Wadley Loop receiver, which allowed precision tuning over wide bands, a task that had previously required switching out multiple crystals. The Wadley Loop was first used in the Racal RA-17 a 1950s top-of-the-range British military short wave receiver and later in the South African made, commercially available "Barlow-Wadley XCR-30" radio. The Wadley Loop is more widely used today in spectrum analysers, where the noise sidebands of the analyser's tunable oscillator are cancelled due to the spectrum analyser having a sideband noise much lower than the signals being measured. This device was even more useful to the SABC, SAPO, the South African Military and British Government agencies.

A Wadley receiver (circa 1952) is on display at the South African Institute of Electrical Engineers historical collection in Observatory, Johannesburg.

== Tellurometer ==
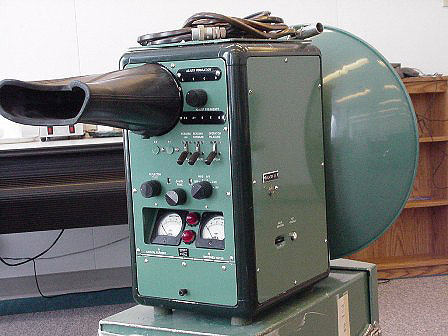
Tellurometer Model M/RA-1

In the early 1950s the CSIR was asked to develop a portable measuring device that could measure distances with an accuracy of 1 in 100 000. In 1954 this project was given to Wadley. Colonel Harry A. Baumann (Rhodes Scholar, engineer and Land Surveyor) of the South African Trigonometrical Survey had already come up with the invention and Wadley developed it further.

The Tellurmeter could measure up to a distance of 80 km by measuring the time delay in microwave transmissions. It was used in land surveying but has been mostly replaced with laser-based systems. The replacement to the microwave tellurometer was also developed by a South African, H.D. Hölscer. Miniaturised versions are still used in some surveying instruments and mine lift-shafts.

One of the first test of the tellurometer involved a measurement of the distance between Brixton Hill in Western Johannesburg and Fort Klapperkop in Pretoria, this being the most accurately known survey baseline in South Africa at the time. It successfully proved the accuracy of the tellurometer but, over time, Wadley noticed a bias to the measurements he was obtaining. He ascribed these to an inaccurate value of the speed of light that had been supplied to him. He approached the National Physical Laboratory in Teddington in England and they agreed to do a new measurement of the speed of light. The new measurement vindicated Wadley's claim. In 1958 the Tellurometer was used to measure Manhattan (13.08 miles). The measurement took 1 hour (plus two hours for the technicians to move from the south end of the island to the north.) Previously the measurement had taken 5 days.

When the system was demonstrated in England before a group including the British Prime Minister, Harold Macmillan, it showed that a line on the Salisbury Plain which had been used as the baseline for British surveying had been incorrectly calculated by 1.5 meters. Subsequent sales of the device earned more than R300 million (in 1960's terms) in foreign revenue for South Africa. Tellurometers are still manufactured in Plumstead, South Africa.

== Ionosonde ==
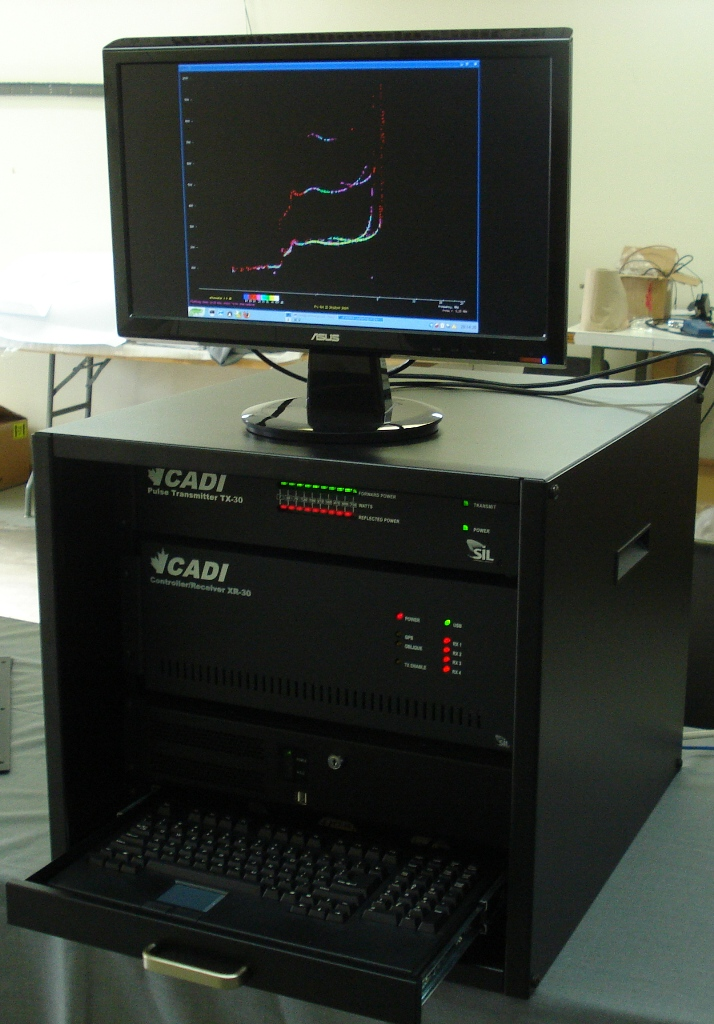
Example of an Ionosonde

At the CSIR he developed a local version of the device called an ionosonde for measuring the Earth's ionosphere; the original device was developed by Breit and Tuve in 1925. It is a specialised form of a radar detector used to measure the height of the ionised layers of air between 50 and 600 kilometers. This information gives insight into what is occurring during an ionospheric storm. The ionosonde was used to provide a transmission frequency prediction service to the SABC, the South African Postal Service (SAPO) and South African Military.

== Patents ==
- Distance measuring system. US3241139A (1964)
- Determining relative position by means of transit time of waves. US2907999A (1955) & US3229285A (1960)
- Device including a rotating magnet positioned relative to another magnet for indicating the presence of magnetizable elements. US3541438A (1967)

== Recognition ==
- DSc in electrical engineering - thesis "Heterodyne Techniques in Specialised Instrumentation".
- Honorary doctorate from the University of Cape Town.
- In 1967 he presented the electrical principles of the Tellurometer at the Royal Geographical Society.
- Gold medal from South African Institute of Electrical Engineers in 1960.
- Frank P. Brown Medal from the Franklin Institute in America in 1970 for Development of Microwave Surveying Instrument.
- The South African post office issued a 25-year commemorative stamp of Wadley and the Tellurometer in February 1979.
- Durban High School instituted an annual mathematics prize in his honour in 2016.
- Durban municipality named a street Trevor Wadley close in his honour.

== General references ==
- Burton, Mike. "The Annotated Old Four Legs" p. 103 (sidebar) Penguin-Random House South Africa
- Talbot, Daniel B. "Frequency Acquisition Techniques for Phase Locked Loops" p. 166 John Wiley & Sons
- Berg, Jerome S. (2008) "Listening on the Short Waves, 1945 to Today" p. 290 McFarland & Co, Inc
- Smith, James R. "Introduction to Geodesy: The History and Concepts of Modern Geodesy" p. 67 John Wiley & Sons
