= Zibusiso Mkhwanazi =

South African entrepreneur

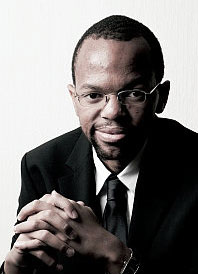
- Zibusiso Mkhwanazi
- Born: 10 June 1983 (age 42); South Africa
- Education: University of Johannesburg
- Occupation: Entrepreneur
- Title: Group CEO of M&N Brands, founder of Avatar
- Awards: World Economic Forum Young Global Leaders (2010), Top Young ICT Entrepreneur in Africa Award (2008)

Zibusiso Mkhwanazi (born 10 June 1983, Soweto, South Africa) is Group CEO of M&N Brands and co-founder of Avatar, Avatar won Financial Mail's AdFocus medium-sized agency of the year 2016 and were a finalist in 2017. A World Economic Forum Young Global Leader, Mkhwanazi is now building an African owned agency network through his investment company, M&N Brands.

Mkhwanazi is a Trustee of the National Economic and Education Trust (NEET), which has provided over 4,200 scholarships to underprivileged ICT students. Born in 1983, he is the founder of David's League, a Christianity-based mentorship program to support young entrepreneurs.

== Career ==
Mkhwanazi started his first business, Csonke, a web design company, at the age of 17 (in 2000). Csonke then merged with Krazyboyz in 2007 and Mkhwanazi served as Executive Chairman until July 2010, developing and overseeing growth, strategy and marketing for both the Cape Town and Johannesburg offices. He then took on the role of CEO from July 2010 – December 2011.

In January 2012, Mkhwanazi went into partnership with Veli Ngubane to found Avatar, which has won numerous awards (AdFocus) including most digitally integrated agency (MarkLives) and also the agency that has done the most to drive transformation in the SA industry (MarkLives). Avatar opened their Cape Town office in 2016 and have won numerous accounts such as H&M and Chevron.

He also served as Chairman of ARM advertising and design in 2009, as well as Chairman of The Red quarter Brand Design August 2010 – November 2013.

Mkhwanazi is the majority shareholder in M&N Brands, with partner Veli Ngubane, an investment company building an African owned agency network. In 2017 they acquired Mela Events, a gold-Loerie award-winning events company with clients such as Standard Bank and Nando's. In 2017, the 33-year-old Financial Mail ADFocus awards created the industry's first transformation award at Mkhwanazi's urging, which was sponsored by M&N Brands.

== Education ==
"Mkhwanazi’s story from the humble streets of Soweto" is as follows:

Bramley primary school, Bedfordview High School, NDip Information Technology (2005) and Dip Corporate Law (2006) at the University of Johannesburg, Foundations for Leadership in the 21st Century (2012) Yale and Global Leadership and Public Policy for the 21st Century (2013) at Harvard.

== Awards and distinctions ==
- BBQ Young Business Achiever in 2007
- 100 Young South Africans June 2007
- Top ICT Individual in Africa and Top ICT Young Entrepreneur in Africa, both in 2008
- Men's Health Best Man Editor's Choice Award in 2009
- 200 Young South Africans
- IT Personality finalist for 2009 and 2010
- World Economic Forum Young Global leader
- Finalist for Best Individual Contribution to SA Digital Marketing, 2011.
- Named Top 25 media game changer, 2012 and Media Rockstar 2013.
- Financial Mail Adfocus New Broom Award, 2014
- Top 40 under 40s in The Media, 2015.
- Contender Most admired ad agency boss in South Africa 2016
- AALBA 2017 finalist
- EY World Entrepreneur of the Year 2018 Finalist
