= Gamedze =

Gamedze is a surname. Notable people with the surname include:

- Mgwagwa Gamedze, acting prime minister of Eswatini (2023)
- Natan Gamedze, (born 1963) Haredi rabbi and lecturer
