= Shulamith Behr =

South African art historian (1946–2023)

- Born: Shulamith Ruch; 21 December 1946
- Died: 7 April 2023 (aged 76)
- Education: University of Witwatersrand (BA Fine Arts), (BA Hons) University of Manchester (MA) University of Essex (PhD)
- Occupations: Art historian, lecturer, author, curator
- Awards: 2007–2008 Leverhulme Trust Research Fellowship

Shulamith Behr (1946–2023) was a British art historian. She was a senior lecturer, and Honorary Research Fellow at the Courtauld Institute of Art. She was a specialist in 20th-century German Expressionism, with a particular interest in German and Swedish women artists.

== Early life and education ==
Behr was born in South Africa, and earned a B.A. Honours degree in Fine Arts in 1969, from the University of Witwatersrand, winning the Henri Lidchi Prize as the top undergraduate in the History of Art. In 1971 she obtained a First Class Honours degree in the History of Art, and stayed on as a lecturer at the University of Witwatersrand until 1978. Behr completed her studies in the United Kingdom, earning an MA in Art History at Manchester University, and a PhD in Art History and Theory at the University of Essex.

== Career ==
Behr joined the faculty of the Courtauld Institute of Art in 1990, as Bosch Lecturer in German Art. In 2000 she was appointed Senior Lecturer in Twentieth-Century German Art, and in 2012 was named an Honorary Research Fellow.

She was considered a leading expert in the field of German Expressionism, publishing and/or editing 10 books, curating 4 exhibitions and contributing to exhibition catalogues in the United Kingdom and Germany. In 2007/08 she held the post of Leverhulme and CRASSH Research Fellow at Cambridge University. The AKO Foundation endowed a post in honour of Behr, Tangen Reader in 20th Century Modernism, at the instigation of her former pupil, Nicolai Tangen.

Behr became a specialist in women artists working in Germany and Sweden in the Expressionist period, and her publications include Women Expressionists (1988) and Women Artists in Expressionism: From Empire to Emancipation (2022). She was also interested in artists and collectors in exile, echoing her family heritage as emigres to South Africa from eastern Europe, expressed in her publication Arts in Exile in Britain 1933–1945.

== Personal life ==
Behr married Bernard Behr in 1968 and has two sons Elijah and Gabriel.

== Selected publications ==
- Women Artists in Expressionism: From Empire to Emancipation, Princeton University Press, Princeton and Oxford, 2022 ISBN 9780691044620
- Expressionism, Tate Movements in Modern Art, Tate Gallery Publishing, London, 1999; Cambridge University Press, New York, 2000: translated into nine languages (Brazilian Portuguese, Danish, Dutch, French, Italian, Portuguese, Spanish, Swedish and Korean) ISBN 978-1-8543-7252-9
- Arts in Exile in Britain 1933-1945. Politics and Cultural Identity, Yearbook No. 6, Research Centre for German and Austrian Exile Studies, Institute of Germanic and Romance Studies, Edited with Marian Malet University of London, Rodopi Press, Amsterdam and New York, 2005, ISBN 90-420-1786-4
- Between Politics and the Studio: Conrad Felixmüller (1897-1977), ed. Shulamith Behr and Amanda. Wadsley, New Walk Museum and Art Gallery, Leicester, 1994, ISBN 085022 3652
- Expressionism Reassessed, ed. Shulamith Behr, David Fanning and Douglas Jarman, Manchester University Press, Manchester, 1993, ISBN 9780719038433 hardback ISBN 0 7190 3844 8 paperback
- Women Expressionists, Phaidon, Oxford/Rizzoli, New York, 1988, ISBN 0-7148-2510 -7
