= Natan Gamedze =

Swazi Haredi rabbi and lecturer (be.1963)

- Born: Nkosinath Gamedze; 1963 (age 62–63); Swaziland
- Education: Ohr Somayach, Jerusalem; Brisk yeshiva, Old City, Jerusalem
- Occupations: teacher, lecturer
- Known for: African prince who became a Black Haredi Jewish rabbi
- Spouse: Shayna Golda Gordon

Natan Gamedze (born 1963, Swaziland) is a Haredi rabbi and lecturer. Born to the royal lineage of the Gamedze clan of the Kingdom of Eswatini, he converted to Judaism, received rabbinic ordination, and now lectures to Jewish audiences all over the world with his personal story as to how an African prince became a Black Haredi Jewish rabbi.

== Family background ==
Gamedze's grandfather was the king of Swaziland. But the British, who had colonized southern Africa and created the states of Swaziland, Basutoland, and Bechuanaland, drew their own borders which lumped diverse ethnic groups into the same state. The British also chose a rival royal family to rule Swaziland, compensating the Gamedze clan with ministerial positions. Gamedze's father lost the title of "king" but became known as "paramount chief", and was also named minister of education and ambassador to the EEC countries.

Scholarly history of Swaziland shows that the independent chiefdom or small kingdom ruled by members of the Gamedze clan was initially conquered and incorporated into the growing Ngwane kingdom ruled by members of the Dlamini clan sometime in the late 18th or early 19th century, long before British colonization. The Gamedze clan is classified among the Emakhandzambili category of clans ("those found ahead") according to Swazi royalist tradition, meaning that they were on the land prior to Dlamini immigration and conquest, as opposed to the Bomdzabuko ("true Swazi") who accompanied the Dlamini kings, and the Emafikemuva ("those who came behind") who joined the kingdom later. Emakhandzambile clans initially were incorporated with wide autonomy, and often in part by granting them special ritual and political status, but the extent of their autonomy was drastically curtailed by King Mswati II, including the Gamedze, whom Mswati attacked and subdued in the 1850s.

== Early life and education ==
Gamedze was one of eight children born to his parents in Swaziland. He grew up in Swaziland until the age of eight and was educated in private schools there and in London. He went on to earn his Honours at the University of Oxford, earning his undergraduate and post-graduate degrees in Modern Languages and Translations, majoring in German, Italian, and French. He received his master's degree at University of the Witwatersrand in 1987. By 1988 he was an official translator of the German language for the Supreme Court of South Africa. He is fluent in 14 languages, half of them European and the other half African.

In an Italian literature class at Wits, he noticed someone writing from right to left in his notebook and found out that the language was Hebrew. Later he decided to take a Hebrew language course at that university, which sparked his interest in Jewish texts. Upon the invitation of Moshe Sharon, a professor at Hebrew University of Jerusalem, he came to Israel to study for a doctorate in Hebrew language. While in Israel, he took philosophy classes at Ohr Somayach Yeshiva in Jerusalem, and converted to Judaism in 1991. He continued to learn at Ohr Somayach for another four years. Among his study partners was Dr. Henry Abramson. From 1995 to 2000 he took advanced Talmudic classes at the Brisk yeshiva in Jerusalem's Old City, where he received his rabbinic ordination.

Toward the end of his time at Brisk, Gamzede was introduced to his wife, Shayna Golda Gordon, a baalat teshuva (returnee to Orthodox Judaism) from New York who had studied at Neve Yerushalayim. They lived in Beitar Illit for the first two years of their marriage, where Gamzede learned in a kollel. For the next five years they resided in Safed, where Rabbi Gamzede taught at Yeshivat Shalom Rav and the Shaarei Bina seminary. Then Gamzede began lecturing for an international kiruv organization. The couple now lives in Jerusalem with their two children.

In 2008, the Australian Broadcasting Corporation produced a documentary about Rabbi Gamzede's life titled Compass: The Black Jew of Swaziland.

== See also ==
- History of the Jews in Africa
- History of the Jews in Eswatini (Swaziland)
- History of the Jews in South Africa
- History of the Jews in Southern Africa
