= Affiong Williams =

Nigerian agribusiness entrepreneur

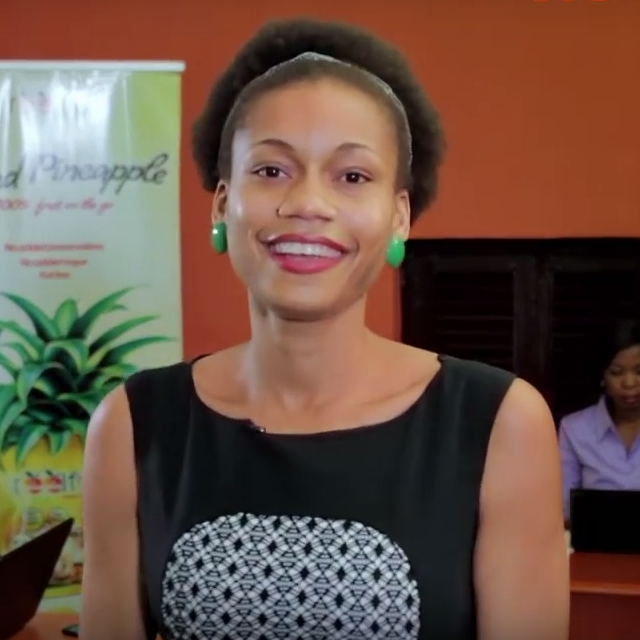
- Williams in 2014
- Born: 1987 (age 38–39)
- Education: University of Witwatersrand
- Occupation: Entrepreneur
- Years active: 2012 - present
- Organization: Reef Fruit
- Known for: founding Reel Fruit
- Spouse: Tayo Oviosu
- Website: reelfruit.com

Affiong Williams is a Nigerian entrepreneur from Cross River State. She is the founder and CEO of Reel Fruit, a Nigerian company that processes and distributes locally grown fruits. She is married to Tayo Oviosu, the CEO of the finance company Paga.

== Education ==
Williams is a graduate in physiology and psychology from the University of Witwatersrand, South Africa. She also holds a postgraduate diploma in business management from the same university. She also attended the Stanford Graduate School of Business where she took part in the Seed Transformation Program of 2018.

== Career ==
After her postgraduate diploma, she worked with Endeavour South Africa from 2008 to 2012 where she rose to the position of Portfolio Manager. She returned to Nigeria in 2012 and started off Reel Fruit, her own agribusiness. She is said to have started the company in her apartment in Surulere, with an initial savings of $8,000.

== Personal life ==
She is married to Tayo Oviosu, the founder and CEO of the finance company Paga.

== Awards and recognitions ==
She was listed by Forbes among "Africa's Most Promising Entrepreneurs" in 2015. ReelFruit won an international Women In Business Competition in the Netherlands.

In March 2023, Affiong Williams was named among the "15 African Female Founders You Should Know In 2023" by African Folder.
