= Kitso Lynn Lelliott =

Motswana filmmaker den artist

- Born: c. 1984; Botswana
- Alma mater: University of the Witwatersrand
- Occupation: Film director, artist
- Awards: Mail & Guardian 200 Young South Africans (2014)

Kitso Lynn Lelliott (born c. 1985) is a Botswana filmmaker and multimedia artist based in Johannesburg.

== Early life and education ==
Kitso Lynn Lelliott was born in Botswana. She graduated with a bachelor's degree in fine art in 2006 and a master's in film and television in 2011 and a PhD from the University of the Witwatersrand's School of Arts.

== Career ==
Her installation work includes Alzire of Bayreuth (2015) at the Neues Schloss Bayreuth and Sankɔfa Hauntings, Ghosts of a Futures Past (2015) at Cape Coast Castle in Ghana. Her film The Tailored Suit (2011) is inspired by the short story "The Suit" (1963) by Can Themba, but the film foregrounds the experience of black women in response to Themba's work. It premiered at the Tri-Continental Film Festival in South Africa in 2011.

Her work was featured at the 2015 Bamako Encounters African Biennale of Photography, the 2016 Kampala Art Biennial and the 2018 LagosPhoto Festival

== Awards and honors ==
Kitso Lynn Lelliott was named to the 2014 list of the Mail & Guardian 200 Young South Africans. Her work Abénaa / Alzire / Dandara / Tsholofelo (working title) won Iwalewa Art Award in 2018 and the BestVisual Art in 2019 in the annual awards from the South African National Institute for the Humanities and Social Sciences. She was awarded the 2024 Henrike Grohs Art Award by the Goethe-Institut. They noted her for "its articulation of disobedience and disruption...the jury viewed it not as a final achievement but as a constant state of becoming—a metaphor for the artist herself. Kitso embodies a perpetual reinvention, eschewing the notion of a finished work in favour of one that exists and re-exists, signifying a continuous and evolving artistic journey."
