= Sunday Times Rich List 2018 =

The Sunday Times Rich List 2018 is the 30th annual survey of the wealthiest people resident in the United Kingdom, published by The Sunday Times on 13 May 2018.

The list was edited by Robert Watts who succeeded long-term compiler Philip Beresford last year.

The list was previewed in the previous week's Sunday Times and widely reported by other media.

== Top 12 fortunes ==
2018		Name	Citizenship	Source of wealth	2017	
Rank	Net worth £ bn	Name	Citizenship	Source of wealth	Rank	Net worth £ bn
01 ▲	£21.05 ▲	Sir Jim Ratcliffe	United Kingdom	Industry (Ineos)	18	£5.75
02 ▼	£20.64 ▲	Sri and Gopi Hinduja	United Kingdom	Industry and finance	1	£16.20
03 ▼	£15.26 ▼	Sir Len Blavatnik	United States	Investment, music and media	2	£15.98
04 ▼	£15.09 ▲	David and Simon Reuben	United Kingdom	Property and Internet	3	£14.00
05 ▼	£14.66 ▲	Lakshmi Mittal and family	India	Steel	4	£13.22
06 ▲	£11.10 ▲	Charlene de Carvalho-Heineken and Michel de Carvalho	Netherlands	Inheritance, banking, brewing (Heineken)	10	£9.30
07 ▲	£10.84 ▲	Kirsten Rausing and Jörn Rausing	Sweden	Inheritance and investment (Tetra Pak)	8	£9.66
08 ▼	£10.55 ▼	Alisher Usmanov	Russia	Mining and investment	5	£11.79
09 ▼	£10.05 ▼	Galen Weston and George G. Weston and family	Canada & United Kingdom	Retailing	7	£10.50
10 ▼	£9.96 ▲	The 7th Duke of Westminster	United Kingdom	Inheritance and property	9	£9.52
11 ▼	£9.66 ▼	Ernesto and Kirsty Bertarelli	Switzerland & United Kingdom	Pharmaceuticals	6	£11.50
12 ▲	£9.50 ▲	Sir James Dyson and family	United Kingdom	Industry (Dyson)	14	£7.80

== See also ==
- Forbes list of billionaires
