= Bridget van Kralingen =

- Born: 1963 (age 62–63); England
- Citizenship: South Africa
- Education: University of the Witwatersrand, University of Johannesburg, University of South Africa
- Occupation: Business executive
- Years active: 1986–present
- Title: Partner at Motive
- Board member of: Royal Bank of Canada, Partnership for New York City

Bridget A. van Kralingen (born 1963) is a business executive born in England and raised in South Africa.

Beginning in 2022, she is Partner at Motive Partners, a private equity firm.

Before joining Motive, she served as Senior Vice President of IBM Global Industry Platforms in New York City, and as Senior VP of IBM Global Markets.

Before joining IBM in 2004, she worked for nearly 14 years for Deloitte in several management positions. Educated in South Africa, she has been named in Fortune's 50 Most Powerful Women list since 2005.

== Education ==
Van Kralingen earned a bachelor's degree in commerce from the University of the Witwatersrand in 1984, followed by an honors degree in commerce from the University of Johannesburg in 1985. She received a master's degree in commerce and psychology from the University of South Africa in 1990.

== Career ==
Van Kralingen began her career as a senior researcher for the Council for Scientific and Industrial Research in South Africa from 1986 to 1989. She then moved to Deloitte in South Africa, where she was Managing Partner for Strategy and Organization Development from 1989 to 1997. In 1997 she moved to New York City to serve as a National Managing Partner for Financial Services at Deloitte Consulting, a position she held until 2004.

In April 2004 van Kralingen joined IBM Global Services in New York City as a Global Managing Partner of Financial Services. In November 2006 she was promoted to General Manager of IBM Global Business Services for Northeast Europe, Middle East, and Africa. From January 2010 to January 2012, she served as General Manager for IBM North America.

In 2012 van Kralingen was promoted to Senior Vice President of IBM Global Business Services. As Senior Vice President, van Kralingen oversaw more than 100,000 consultants and service providers in over 170 countries. From 2012 through 2019, she led IBM’s Industry Platforms, establishing IBM as the leader in enterprise blockchain, launching industry platforms with clients and managing IBM’s industry capabilities and largest accounts

In April 2020, van Kralingen was named Senior Vice President of IBM Global Markets managing IBM sales teams, business partners, business development and industry capabilities globally. In this role, she is responsible for IBM’s revenue, profit, and client satisfaction worldwide.

== Other activities ==
In 2011 Van Kralingen joined the board of directors of the Royal Bank of Canada. She is also an advisory board member of the nonprofit organization Partnership for New York City.

== Honors ==
Van Kralingen was named in Fortune's 50 Most Powerful Women list for five consecutive years in the 2010s. She ranked #39 in 2011, #23 in 2012, #28 in 2013, #37 in 2014, and #35 in 2015.

She was named one of the Top 25 Consultants in 2006 by Consulting Magazine, and one of the 100 Most Influential People in Finance in 2005 by Euromoney.

== Selected articles ==
- "Public-Private Partnerships Are Key to U.S. Competitiveness" The Huffington Post, 18 December 2011
- "The Future of Leadership: Leading Through Systemic Change" The Huffington Post, 19 September 2011
- "We Need to Redefine ROI In Our Everyday World" The Huffington Post, 20 October 2010
- "IBM's Transformation – From Survival To Success" Forbes, 7 July 2010
