= Jules Fejer =

Hungarian physicist

Jules Fejer (Hungarian: Fejer Gyula Endre; 22 January 1914 – 21 December 2002) was a Hungarian-born physicist.

Fejer was born in Budapest, Austria-Hungary on 22 January 1914, son of Ernest Fejer and Stella Popper.

As an engineer with South Africa's National Institute for Telecommunications Research (NITR), He published the first estimate of the life expectancy of the recently launched Sputnik in Nature. His prediction was far more accurate than those made by the Russians, British and Americans.

He obtained an MSc degree in Electrical Engineering from University of the Witwatersrand entitled Theory of Transit Time Oscillators, completed in 1948 and awarded in March 1949.

In the late 1950s he wrote a fundamental paper on incoherent backscatter, explaining why the width of the backscattered echo was determined primarily by the ion thermal velocity rather than by the electron thermal velocity. He was one of a group of ionospheric physicists brought together by Henry G. Booker to start what became the Electrical and Computer Engineering department at the University of California, San Diego. He was elected a Fellow of the American Geophysical Union in 1990 and continued work with graduate students until 1995.
