= SOAS University of London =

Public university in England

Coordinates: 51.52205°N 0.12900°W

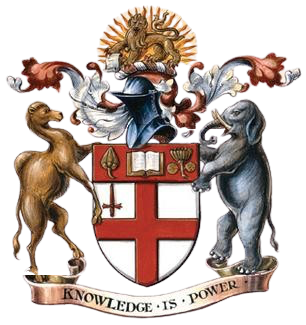
- Coat of arms
- Other name: SOAS
- Former names: School of Oriental Studies (1916–1938); School of Oriental and African Studies (SOAS), University of London (1938–2016; remains legal name)
- Motto: Knowledge is Power
- Type: Public
- Established: 1916; 110 years ago
- Affiliations: ACU; University of London; Universities UK
- Endowment: £60.1 million (2025)
- Budget: £116.1 million (2024/25)
- Chair: Lord Hastings of Scarisbrick
- Chancellor: The Princess Royal (as Chancellor of the University of London)
- President: Zeinab Badawi
- Vice-Chancellor: Adam Habib
- Academic staff: 635 (2024/25)
- Administrative staff: 635 (2024/25)
- Students: 6,400 (2024/25); 5,990 FTE (2024/25)
- Undergraduates: 4,315 (2024/25)
- Postgraduates: 2,085 (2024/25)
- Location: London, United Kingdom
- Campus: Urban
Colors
Yellow and Grey
- Mascots: Arabian camel and Asian elephant
- Website: soas.ac.uk

SOAS University of London is a public research university in London, England, and a member institution of the federal University of London. Established in 1916, the school specialises in the study of Africa, Asia, and the Middle East. The acronym "SOAS" originally stood for School of Oriental and African Studies, but the institution no longer uses this name since rebranding in 2013.

The university's library is one of the five national research libraries in England. SOAS also houses the SOAS Gallery, which hosts a programme of changing contemporary and historical exhibitions from Asia, Africa, and the Middle East with the aim of presenting and promoting cultures from these regions. The annual income of the institution for 2024–25 was £116.1 million of which £10.7 million was from research grants and contracts, with an expenditure of £111.5 million.

SOAS is divided into three colleges: the College of Humanities; the College of Social Sciences; and the College of Law. The university offers around 350 bachelor's degree combinations, more than 100 one-year master's degrees, and PhD programmes in nearly every department. The university has educated several heads of state, government ministers, diplomats, central bankers, Supreme Court judges, a Nobel Peace Prize Laureate, and many other notable leaders around the world. SOAS is a member of the Association of Commonwealth Universities.

== History ==
=== Origins ===
The School of Oriental Studies was founded in 1916 at 2 Finsbury Circus, London, the then premises of the London Institution. The school received its royal charter on 5 June 1916 and admitted its first students on 18 January 1917. The school was formally inaugurated a month later on 23 February 1917 by George V. Among those in attendance were Earl Curzon of Kedleston, formerly Viceroy of India, and other cabinet officials.

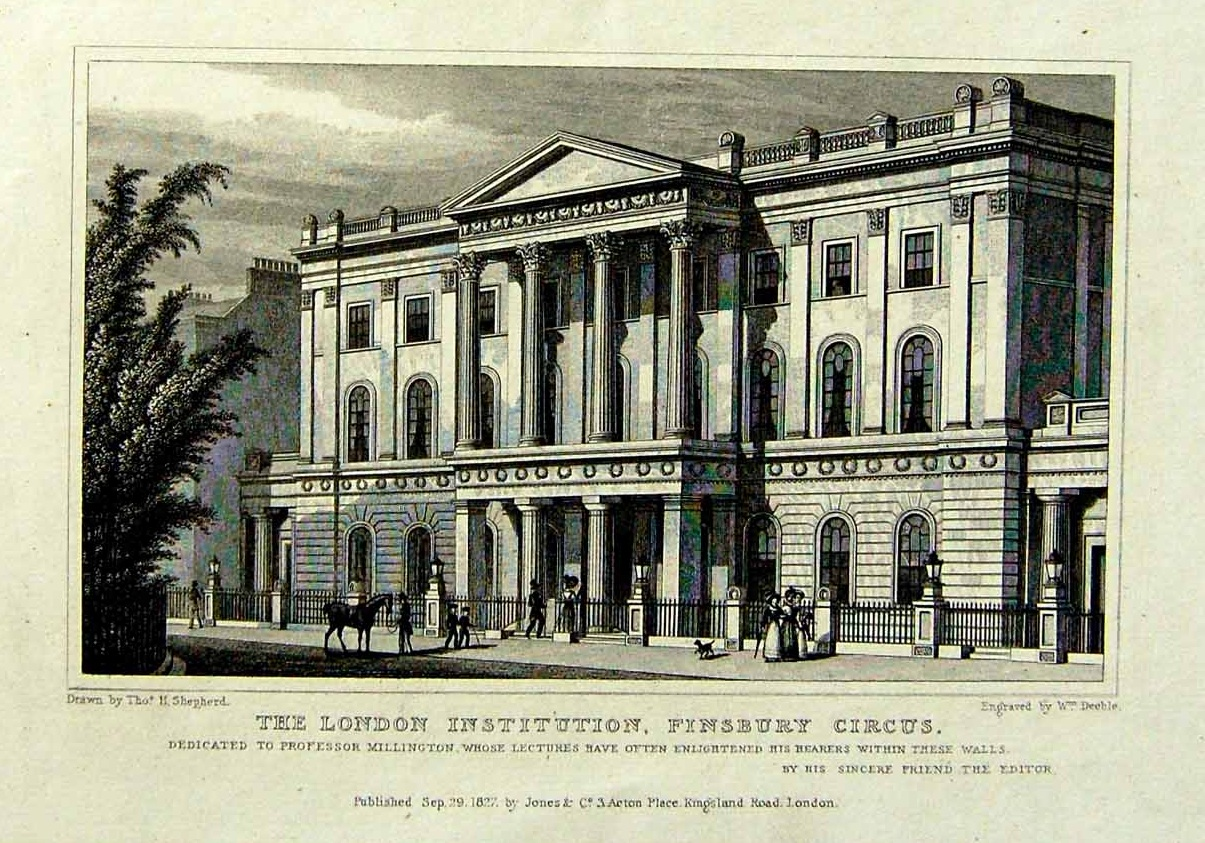
The former premises of the London Institution in Finsbury Circus which originally housed SOAS and was demolished soon after being sold in 1936

The School of Oriental Studies was founded by the British state as an instrument to strengthen Britain's political, commercial, and military presence in Asia and Africa. It would do so by providing instruction to colonial administrators (Colonial Service and Imperial Civil Service), commercial managers, and military officers, as well as to missionaries, doctors, and teachers, in the language of the part of Asia or Africa to which each was being posted, together with an authoritative introduction to the customs, religions, laws, and history of the people whom they were to govern or among whom they would be working.

The school's founding mission was to advance British scholarship, science, and commerce in Africa and Asia, and to provide London University with a rival to the Oriental schools of Berlin, Petrograd, and Paris. The school immediately became integral to training British administrators, colonial officials, and spies for overseas postings across the British Empire. Africa was added to the school's name in 1938.

=== Second World War ===
For a period in the mid-1930s, prior to moving to its current location at Thornhaugh Street, Bloomsbury, the school was located at Vandon House, Vandon Street, London SW1, with the library located at Clarence House. Its move to new premises in Bloomsbury was held up by delays in construction and the half-completed building took a hit during the Blitz in September 1940. With the onset of the Second World War, many University of London colleges were evacuated from London in 1939 and billeted on universities in the rest of the country. The School was, on the Government's advice, transferred to Christ's College, Cambridge.

In 1940, when it became apparent that a return to London was possible, the school returned to the city and was housed for some months in eleven rooms at Broadway Court, 8 Broadway, London SW1. In 1942, the War Office joined with the school to create a scheme for State Scholarships to be offered to select grammar and public-school boys with linguistic ability to train as military translators and interpreters in Chinese, Japanese, Persian, and Turkish. Lodged at Dulwich College in south London, the students became affectionately known as the Dulwich boys. One of these students was Charles Dunn, who became a prominent Japanologist on the faculty of the SOAS and a recipient of the Order of the Rising Sun. Others included Sir Peter Parker and Ronald Dore. Subsequently, the School ran a series of courses in Japanese, both for translators and for interpreters.

=== 1945–present ===
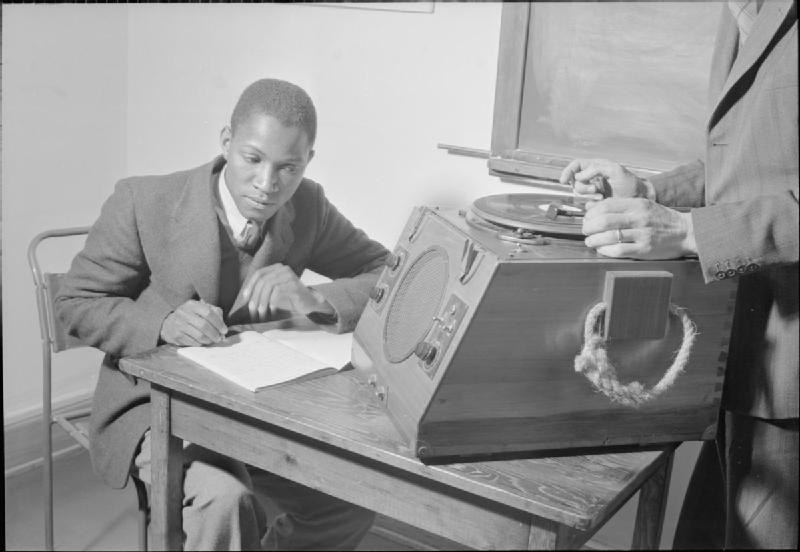
A student from Northern Rhodesia at SOAS in 1946

In recognition of SOAS's role during the war, the 1946 Scarborough Commission (officially the "Commission of Enquiry into the Facilities for Oriental, Slavonic, East European and African Studies") report recommended a major expansion in provision for the study of Asia and the school benefited greatly from the subsequent largesse. The SOAS School of Law was established in 1947 with Seymour Gonne Vesey-FitzGerald as its first head. Growth however was curtailed by following years of economic austerity, and upon Sir Cyril Philips assuming the directorship in 1956, the school was in a vulnerable state. Over his 20-year stewardship, Phillips transformed the school, raising funds and broadening the school's remit.

A college of the University of London, the School's fields include Law, Social Sciences, Humanities, and Languages with special reference to Asia and Africa. The SOAS Library, located in the Philips Building, is the UK's national resource for materials relating to Asia and Africa and is the largest of its kind in the world. The school has grown considerably over the past 30 years, from fewer than 1,000 students in the 1970s to more than 6,000 students today, nearly half of them postgraduates. SOAS is partnered with the Institut National des Langues et Civilisations Orientales (INALCO) in Paris which is often considered the French equivalent of SOAS.

In 2011, the Privy Council approved changes to the school's charter allowing it to award degrees in its own name, following the trend set by fellow colleges the London School of Economics, University College London and King's College London. All new students registered from September 2013 will qualify for a SOAS, University of London, award.

In 2012, a new visual identity for SOAS was launched to be used in print, digital media and around the campus. The SOAS tree symbol, first implemented in 1989, was redrawn and recoloured in gold, with the new symbol incorporating the leaves of ten trees, including the English Oak representing England; the Bodhi, Coral Bark Maple, Teak representing Asia; the Mountain Acacia, African Pear, Lasiodiscus representing Africa; and the Date Palm, Pomegranate and Ghaf representing the Middle East.

=== Student politics ===
==== Israel and Palestine ====
The SOAS Students' Union was the first UK students' union to carry out a referendum, in 2005, to support the Boycott Divestment and Sanctions movement for goods stocked in the Students' Union, and in 2015, the SOAS Students' Union held a referendum in which its members voted to adopt the Boycott, Divestment and Sanctions directions more generally in the university. In 2022, students occupied the management section of the university for nine days, citing the university's investments in Israel amongst other reasons, which led to the university spending £200,000 in their eviction. After Israel's war in Gaza the university management suspended seven students protesting the university's investments in Israel and partnership with Haifa university, a university in Israel with three military colleges and a military base on campus. These students stated that the suspensions were arbitrary and a "targeted act of political repression", whereas the university replied that the students were a "threat to the SOAS community". In the same period, a lecturer reported that security had removed a poster with the Palestinian flag from her door. SOAS responded that the display of the Palestinian flag violated "safeguarding".

SOAS has an active Jewish Society, the first among over 75 across UK campuses to declare itself anti-Zionist. In 2024, and in the context of university protest camps established around the world relating to Israel's war in Gaza, SOAS director Adam Habib hosted a high-level meeting about antisemitism on campus, extending an invite to various Jewish academics on campus, but excluding any representation from the Jewish Society. On 19 April 2024, SOAS posted a job advert for a new Jewish Chaplain whose key responsibilities include supporting "the implementation of a Jewish Society within the Student [sic] Union," therefore implicating that the existing Jewish Society would be replaced by a society organised from the top down.

In December 2020 The Guardian reported that SOAS refunded a student £15,000 in fees after he said he was forced to abandon his studies as a result of the "toxic antisemitic environment" he felt had been allowed to develop on campus. Examples of matters he considered antisemitic are, according to the Guardian report previously cited, that Jews and people who were pro-Israel were described as "Zionist", anti-Semitic graffiti on campus, the student body's public support of the BDS movement, and that his proposal to write a thesis on perceived anti-Israel bias at the UN led to a response that "he was covering up Israeli war crimes and was a white supremacist Nazi". A spokesperson stated that "Soas is extremely concerned about any allegations of antisemitism at our school. Diversity is key to the Soas mission and we want all our students to feel welcome and supported in their studies."

== Campus ==
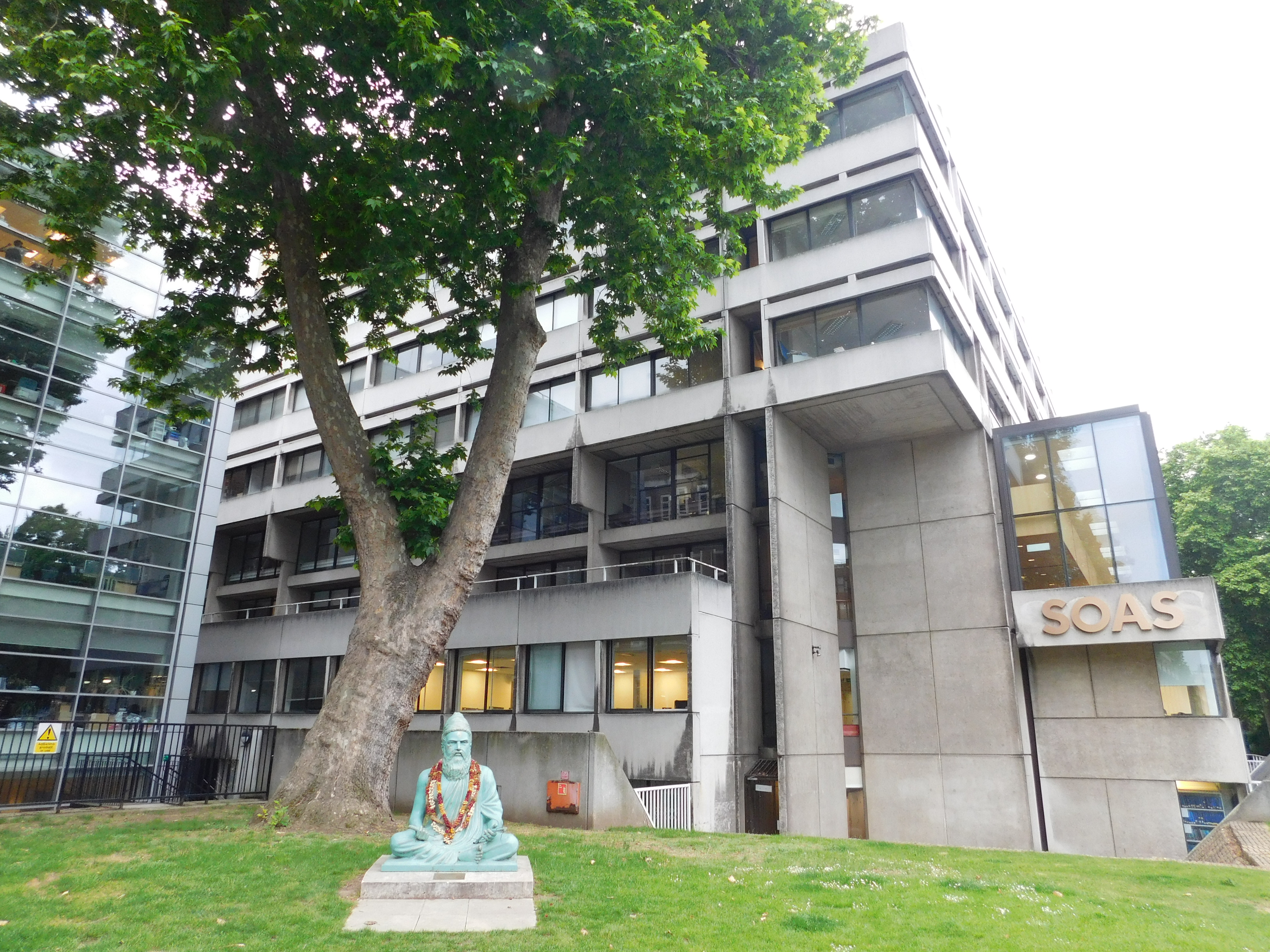
The Philips Building

The campus is located in the Bloomsbury area of central London, close to Russell Square. It includes College Buildings (the Philips Building and the Old Building), Brunei Gallery building, 53 Gordon Square (which houses the Doctoral School) and, since 2016, the Paul Webley Wing (the North Block of Senate House). The SOAS library designed by Sir Denys Lasdun in 1973 is located in the Philips Building. The nearest Underground station is Russell Square.

The SOAS Centenary Masterplan conceived the development of two new buildings and a substantial remodelling of existing space to realign and develop the entrance and two areas within the Old Building. The cost estimates for the Centenary Masterplan settle at around £73m for the total project. The full implementation of the School's Centenary Masterplan would deliver approximately 30% additional space, approximately 1,000 sq metres.

=== East and Southeast Asian Representations on Campus ===
The school houses the Brunei Gallery, built from an endowment from the Sultan of Brunei Darussalam, the leader of a country whose human rights abuses are ongoing, and inaugurated by the Princess Royal, as Chancellor of the University of London, on 22 November 1995. Its facilities include exhibition space on three floors, a book shop, a lecture theatre, and conference and teaching facilities. The Brunei Gallery hosts a programme of changing contemporary and historical exhibitions from Asia, Africa and the Middle East with the aim to present and promote cultures from these regions.

The Japanese-style roof garden on top of the Brunei Gallery was built during the Japan 2001 celebrations and was opened by the sponsor, Haruhisa Handa, an Honorary Fellow of the School, on 13 November 2001.

The school hosted the Percival David Foundation of Chinese Art, one of the foremost collections of Chinese ceramics in Europe. The collection has been loaned to the British Museum, where it is now on permanent display in Room 95.

== Governance and administration ==
=== Presidents ===
Appointed	President
2001	Helena Kennedy
23 April 2012	Graça Machel
5 October 2021	Zeinab Badawi

=== Directors/Vice-Chancellors ===
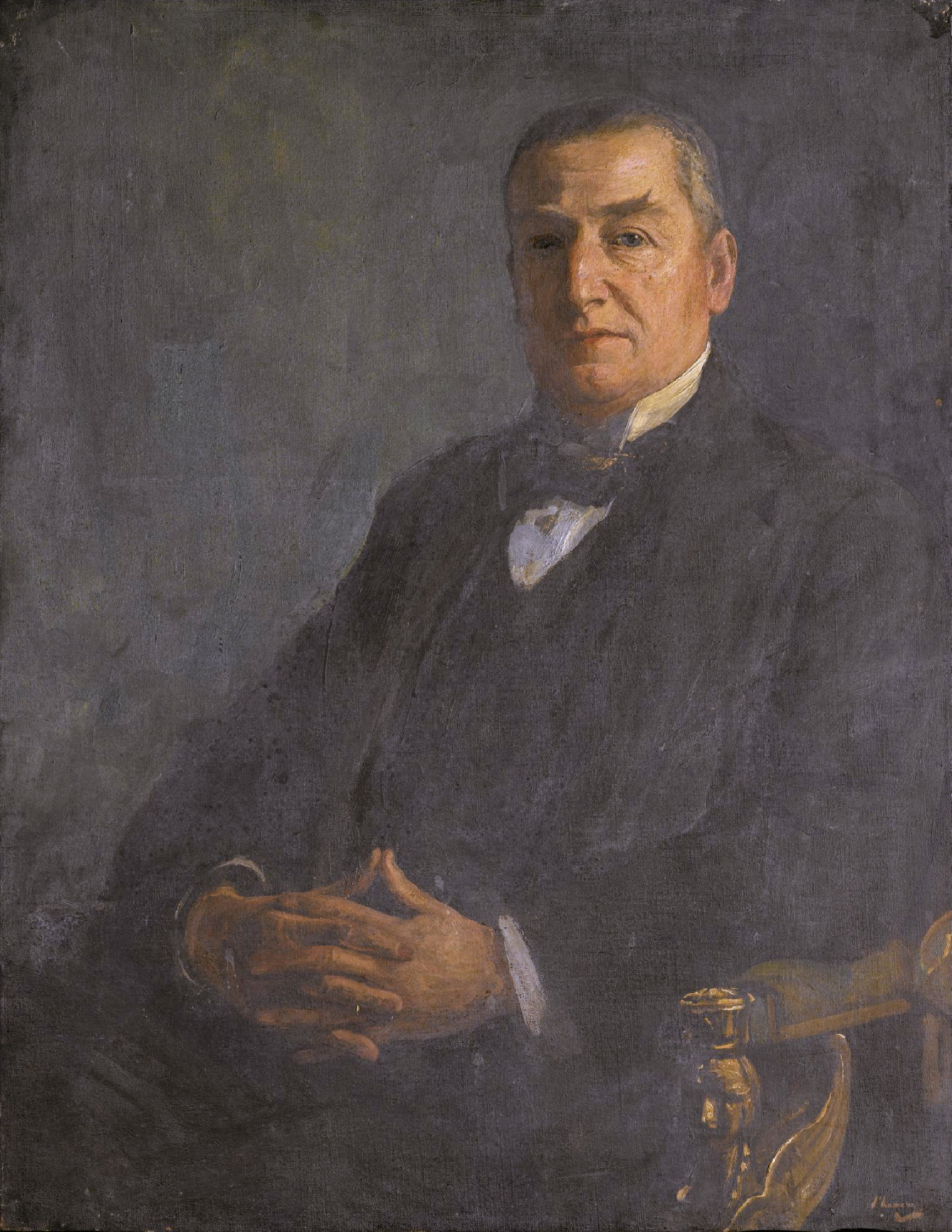
Edward Denison Ross by John Lavery

Since its foundation, the school has had ten directors. The inaugural director was the linguist Edward Denison Ross. Under the stewardship of Cyril Philips, the school saw growth and modernisation. Under Colin Bundy in the 2000s, the school became one of the top ranked universities both domestically and internationally. In January 2021 Adam Habib became director of SOAS in place of Valerie Amos, who had taken up the position of Master at University College, Oxford. In 2024, the position of director was renamed vice-chancellor.

Appointed	Director/Vice-Chancellor
1916	Edward Denison Ross
1937	Ralph Lilley Turner
1956	Cyril Philips
1976	Jeremy Cowan
1989	Michael McWilliam
1996	Tim Lankester
2001	Colin Bundy
2006	Paul Webley
2015	Valerie Amos
2021	Adam Habib

=== Board of Trustees ===
The SOAS Board of Trustees sets policy, mission, and purpose for the university. The Trustees are also responsible for overseeing the management of resources and upholding SOAS's role. The board consists of a chair, two vice-chairs, an honorary treasurer, 10 lay members, the Vice-Chancellor, Provost, and Deputy Vice-Chancellor, Deputy Vice-Chancellor Research and Knowledge Exchange, Deputy Vice-Chancellor of Finance and Operations and Clerk to the Board, a Professional Services Member, college deans, and student representatives.

== Academic organisation ==
=== Colleges and departments ===
SOAS consists of three colleges and these are further divided into schools and departments. SOAS has many Centres and Institutes, each of which is affiliated to a particular faculty.

==== College of Humanities ====
The College of Humanities houses the School of Art, the School of History, Religions and Philosophies, the School of Languages, Cultures and Linguistics, and the School of Anthropology, Media and Gender. The first ever university linguistics department in the United Kingdom was created in 1932 at SOAS, serving as a centre for research and study in Oriental and African languages. J. R. Firth, known internationally for his work in phonology and semantics, was a Senior Lecturer, Reader and Professor of General Linguistics at the school between 1938 and 1956.

The College of Humanities offers courses at the undergraduate and postgraduate levels, with an emphasis on Asia, Africa, and the Middle East. A gift from the Alphawood Foundation in 2013 created the Hiram W. Woodward Chair in Southeast Asian art, the David Snellgrove Senior Lectureship in Tibetan and Buddhist art, and a Senior Lectureship in Curating and Museology of Asian Art, as well as a number of scholarships for students, making the Department of Art & Archaeology a key institution at a global level in the study of Southeast Asia. The university is also a member of the Screen Studies Group, London.

==== College of Social Sciences ====
The College of Social Sciences houses the departments of Development, Politics and International Studies, Economics, and Finance and Management.

==== SOAS School of Law ====
One of the largest individual departments, the SOAS School of Law is one of Britain's leading law schools and the sole law school in the world focusing on the study of Asian, African and Middle Eastern legal systems. The School of Law has more than 400 students. It offers programmes at the LL.B., LL.M. and MPhil/PhD levels. International students have been a majority at all levels for many years.

The SOAS School of Law has an unrivaled concentration of expertise in the laws of Asian and African countries, human rights, transnational commercial law, environmental law, and comparative law. The SOAS School of Law was ranked 15th out of all 98 British law schools by The Guardian League Table in 2016.

Although many modules at SOAS embody a substantial element of English common law, all modules are taught (as much as possible) in a comparative or international manner with an emphasis on the way in which law functions in society. Thus, law studies at SOAS are broad and comparative in their orientation. All students study a significant amount of non-English law, starting in the first year of the LL.B. course, where "Legal Systems of Asia and Africa" is compulsory. Specialised modules in the laws and legal systems of particular countries and regions are also encouraged, and faculty experts conduct modules in these subjects every year.

=== Institutes and regional centres ===
SOAS has a number of region-specific institutions, drawing on expertise across the various colleges:

- SOAS China Institute
- SOAS Middle East Institute
- SOAS South Asia Institute
- SOAS Centre for Taiwan Studies

It also has a number of regional centres and other, non-regional institutes:

- SOAS Shapoorji Pallonji Institute of Zoroastrian Studies
- Centre of African Studies
- Centre for Pan-African Studies
- Centre of Contemporary Central Asia and the Caucasus
- Centre for Iranian Studies
- Centre of Korean Studies
- Centre for the Study of Pakistan
- Centre for Palestine Studies
- Centre of South East Asian Studies
- Japan Research Centre

== Academic profile ==
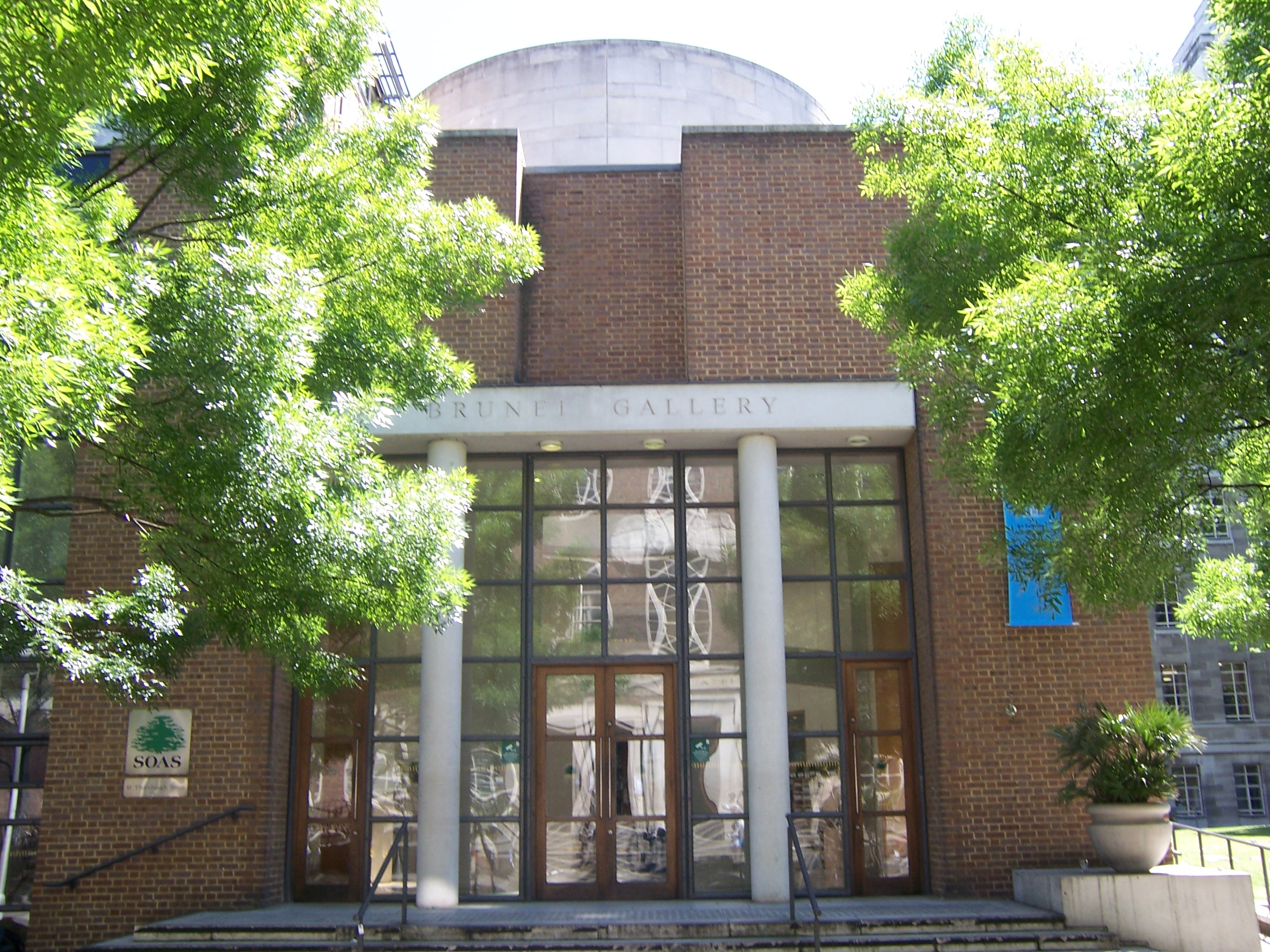
The entrance to the Brunei Gallery

SOAS is a centre for the study of subjects concerned with Asia, Africa and the Middle East. It trains government officials on secondment from around the world in Asian, African and Middle Eastern languages and area studies, particularly in Arabic, Islam, and Middle Eastern Studies formed the major bulk of classical Oriental Studies in Europe – and Mandarin Chinese. It also acts as a consultant to government departments and to companies such as Accenture and Deloitte – when they seek to gain specialist knowledge of the matters concerning Asia, Africa and the Middle East.

The school has a student-staff ratio of 15:1, which in the Complete University Guide 2025 ranked 44th in the UK.

=== Library ===
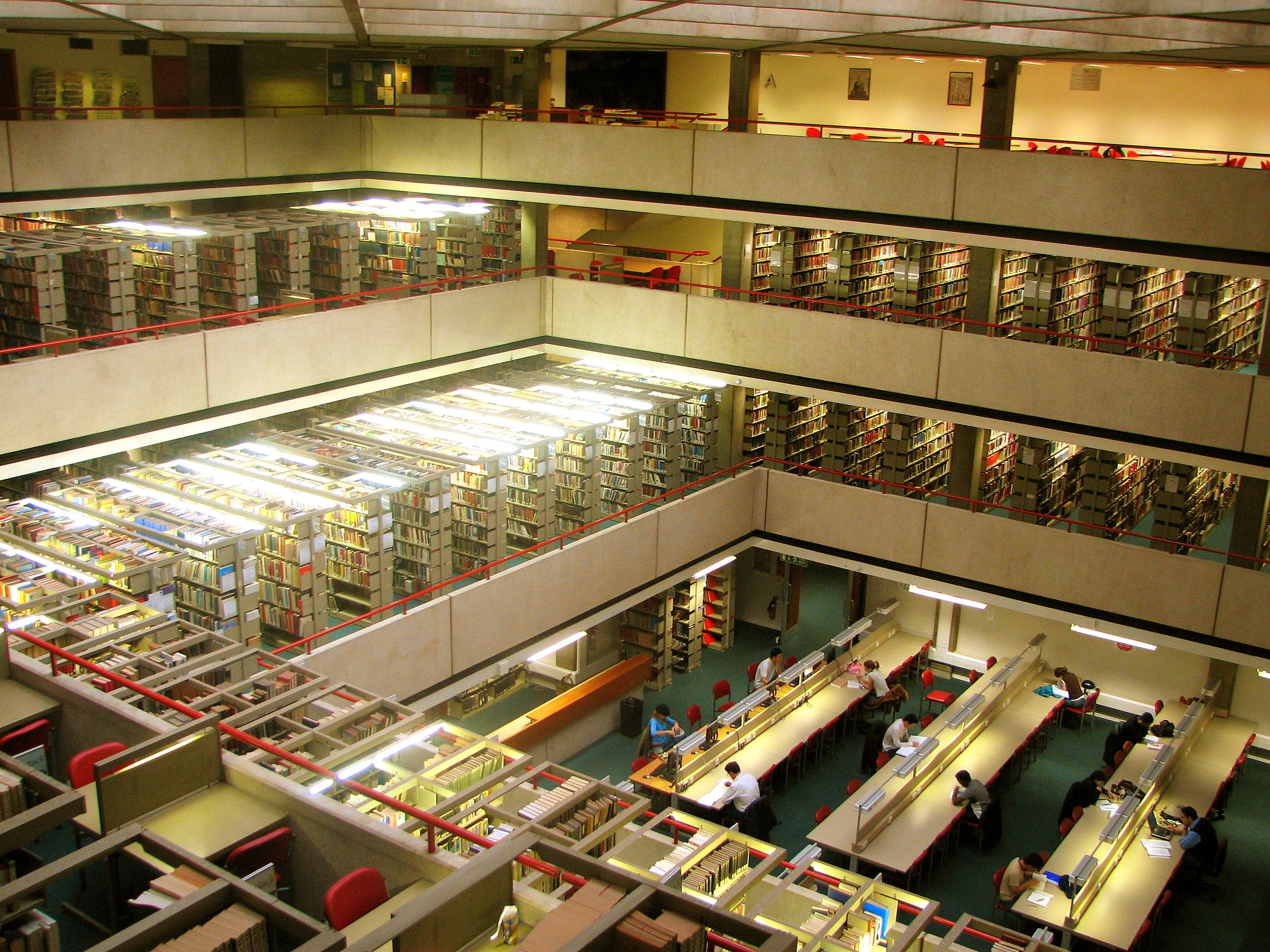
The interior of the SOAS library

The SOAS library is a library for Asian, African and Middle Eastern studies. It houses more than 1.2 million volumes and electronic resources for the study of Africa, Asia and the Middle East, and attracts scholars from all over the world. The library was designated by HEFCE in 2011 as one of the UK's five National Research Libraries.

The library is housed in the Philips Building on the Russell Square campus and was built in 1973. It was designed by architect Sir Denys Lasdun, who also designed some of Britain's brutalist buildings such as the National Theatre and the Institute of Education.

In 2010/11, the library underwent a £12 million modernisation programme, known as "the Library Transformation Project". The work refurbished the ground floor of the library and created new reception and entrance areas, new music practice rooms, group study rooms and a gallery exhibition space.

Since SOAS is a constituent college of the University of London, its students also have access to Senate House Library, shared by other colleges such as London School of Economics and University College London, which is located close to the Russell Square campus.

The library was used as a filming location for some scenes in the 2016 film Criminal.

=== Rankings ===
Rankings
National rankings
- Complete (2027): 94
- Guardian (2027): 122
- Times / Sunday Times (2027): 112

Global rankings
- QS (2027): 458=
- THE (2026): 401–500

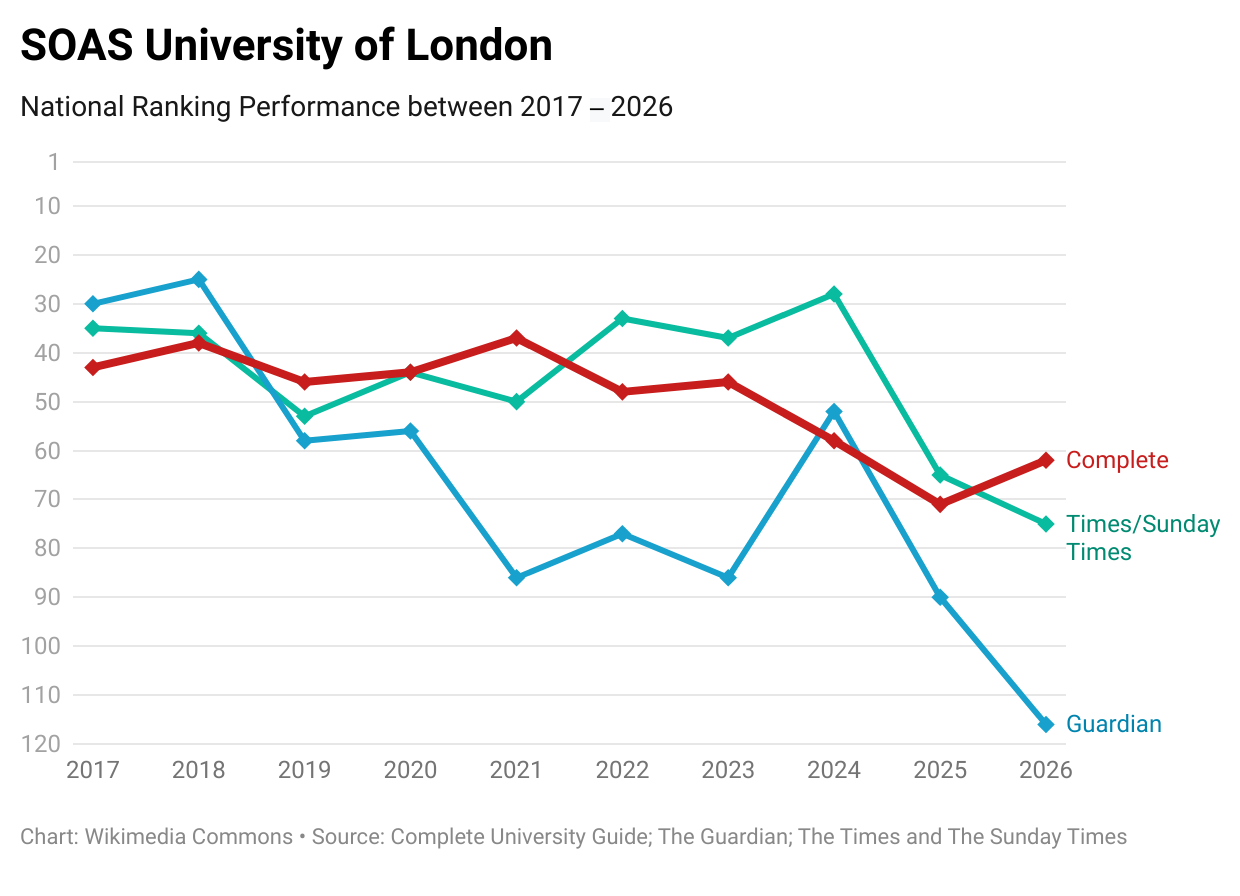
SOAS' national league table performance over the past 10 years

The 2022 QS World University Rankings placed SOAS 2nd in the world for Development Studies, 10th for Anthropology and 15th for Politics. For Arts & Humanities overall, it was placed 67th in the world by the same rankings. As an institution, it placed 508th overall in the QS World University Rankings 2025, having fallen from a high of 252nd in 2017. SOAS ranked 33rd globally for International Students and 49th for International Faculty in the 2023 QS World University Rankings.

SOAS's Department of Financial and Management Studies (DeFiMS) is ranked within the top 60 in the UK for Business Studies in the 2023 Complete University Guide's League Table. The research strength of the department has been previously recognised by the 2021 Research Excellence Framework (REF) where 81 per cent was rated as world-leading and internationally excellent, placing it 41st in the country by GPA.

The results of the 2021 REF took the form of profiles spread across four grade levels. Hence, there are different ways to present them and to rank the departments. According to published tables by Times Higher Education, SOAS is ranked 4th by GPA in the UK for Anthropology (an improvement from 16th in the previous exercise in 2014) and 25th in the UK for Development Studies.

=== Scholarships, bursaries, and awards ===
A range of scholarships and awards support SOAS degree programmes, with an application process based either on academic merit or with a focus on supporting students from specific countries or connected with particular areas of study, as well as some bursaries addressing students' financial needs.

=== Publications ===
SOAS publishes academic journals such as The China Quarterly,Bulletin of the School of Oriental & African Studies, Journal of African Law, South East Asia Research and SOAS Bulletin of Burma Research.

=== Admissions ===
UCAS Admission Statistics
	2025	2024	2023	2022	2021
Applications (Note: Main scheme applications, International and UK)	6,210	6,410	5,950	5,715	5,300
Accepted	1,445	1,675	1,650	1,465	1,395
Applications/Accepted Ratio	4.3	3.8	3.6	3.9	3.8
Overall Offer Rate (%)	91.9	92.1	90.6	89.8	88.8
↳ UK only (%) (Note: UK domiciled applicants)	93.1	93.2	92.6	91.4	90.4
Average Entry Tariff	—N/a	—N/a	—N/a	133	140
↳ Top three exams (Note: The maximum tariff score for three exams is 168: the equivalent of A*A*A* at A-Level, 777 at HL for the IB Diploma Programme, or AAA at Advanced Higher)	—N/a	—N/a	114.5	122.8	125.7

HESA Student Body Composition (2024/25)
Domicile and Ethnicity	Total
British White (Note: Not be confused solely with White British)	19%
British Ethnic Minorities (Note: Includes those who indicate that they identify as Asian, Black, Mixed Heritage, Arab or any other ethnicity except White.)	55%
International EU	4%
International Non-EU	22%
Undergraduate Widening Participation Indicators
Female	62%
Independent School	11%
Low Participation Areas (Note: Calculated from the Polar4 measure, using Quintile1, in England and Wales. Calculated from the Scottish Index of Multiple Deprivation (SIMD) measure, using SIMD20, in Scotland.)	3%

In the 2024/25 academic year, the student body consisted of 6,400 students, composed of 4,315 undergraduates and 2,085 postgraduate students. The university is designated as a 'medium-tariff' institution by the Department for Education, with the average undergraduate entrant to the university in recent years amassing between 114–126 UCAS Tariff points in their top three pre-university qualifications – the equivalent of BBC to ABB at A-Level. Based on 2022/23 HESA entry standards data published in domestic league tables, which include a broad range of qualifications beyond the top three exam grades, the average student at SOAS achieved 133 points.

In 2012, 41% of students were over 21 and 60% were female. According to the QS World University Rankings, SOAS hosts international students from 140 countries.

== Student life ==
SOAS is renowned for its political scene and radical socialist politics and was voted the most politically active university in the UK in the Which? University 2012. Recent campaigns include students for social change, women's liberty and justice for cleaners. The SOAS Student Union was established in 1927, and has a long history of activism: campaigning against the introduction of both student loans and later student fees; raising funds for the Algerian victims of the Algerian War of Independence against France in 1959; and successfully campaigning for the school to divest from fossil fuels. The SU bar became an established live music venue by the 1970s and was where Nirvana played their first UK gig in 1989. The SOAS Marxist Society holds frequent events and encourages student voter registration.

Located in the heart of Bloomsbury, many University of London schools and institutes are close by, including Birkbeck, the Institute of Education, London Business School, the London School of Hygiene & Tropical Medicine, the Royal Veterinary College, the School of Advanced Study, Senate House Library and University College London.

=== Sports ===
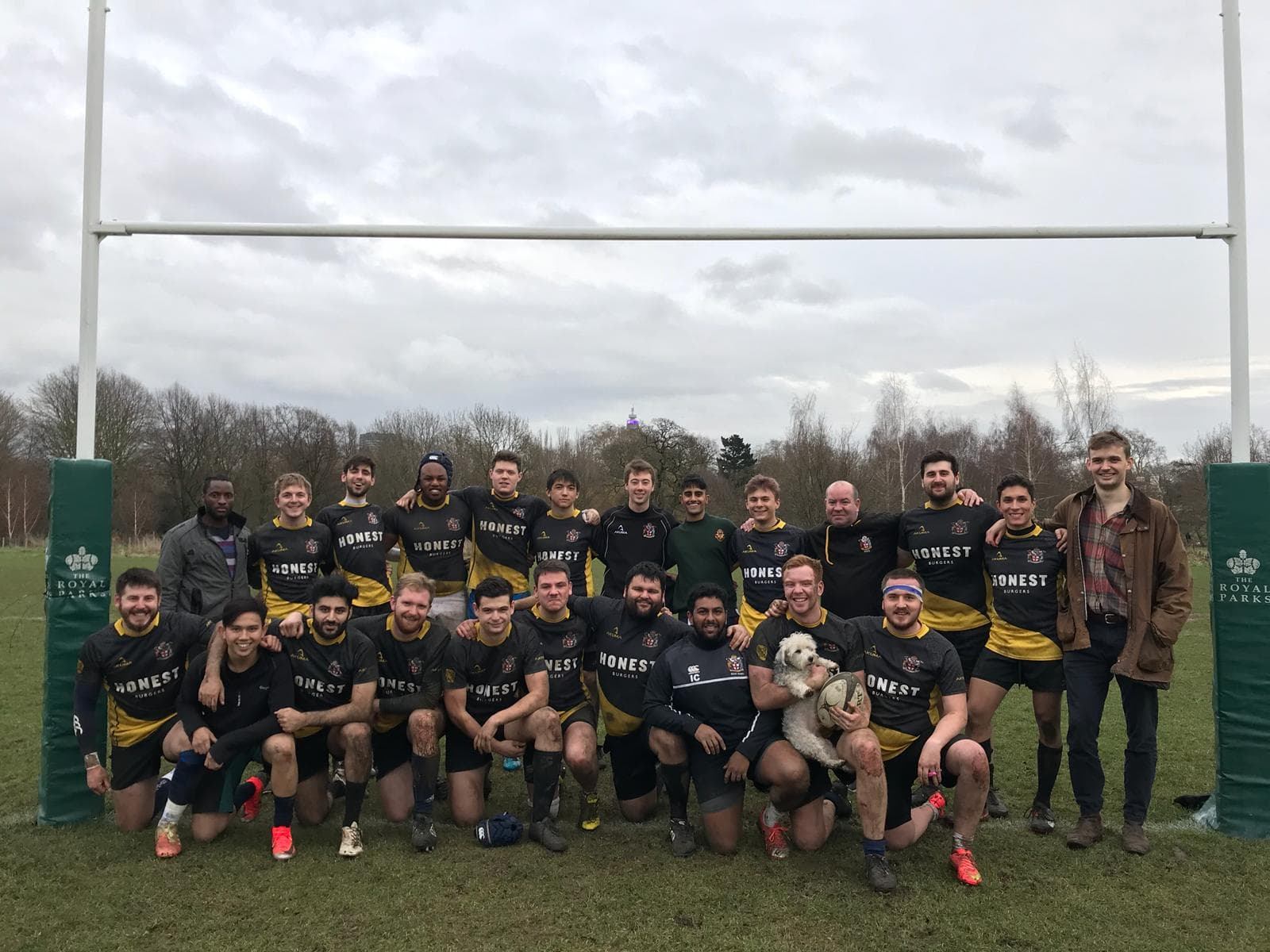
SOAS Men's Rugby Union Team following a victory against the London School of Economics at Regent's Park

SOAS has multiple smaller sports teams competing in a variety of local and national leagues, as well as occasional international tournaments. SOAS clubs compete in inter-university fixtures in the British Universities and Colleges Sport (BUCS) competition in a range of sports, including basketball, football, hockey, netball, rugby union and tennis. SOAS also participates in an annual North London Varsity tournament against London Metropolitan University.

=== On-campus jobs ===
Some programs help students to work part-time on campus alongside their full-time study.

- Education Co-Creator Internship: This is a 64-hour scheme for SOAS undergraduates interested in the education sector. Students work on an innovative project in collaboration with SOAS staff to improve services at their own university.
- Santander Micro-internship: This is a remote 60-hour Santander Universities initiative, targeted towards SOAS students looking to develop an entrepreneurial career. As part of this program, students are typically assigned to a start-up or NGO.
- Student Ambassador: In this job, SOAS students promote their university to high school students.
- Campus Brand Ambassador roles: Depending on availability, students may also take up a job to represent employers such as CMS, Clyde & Co, BDO, Vantage, Dentons, PwC, Barbri, Linklaters, Freshfields, and BCLP on campus. SOAS is not responsible for recruiting for this role – it is the respective external employer or a recruitment agency.

The School of Finance and Management has also partnered with learning platform Practera to offer a Virtual Industry Project, a two-week remote work-based learning experience to give students a taste of consulting roles.

=== Student housing ===
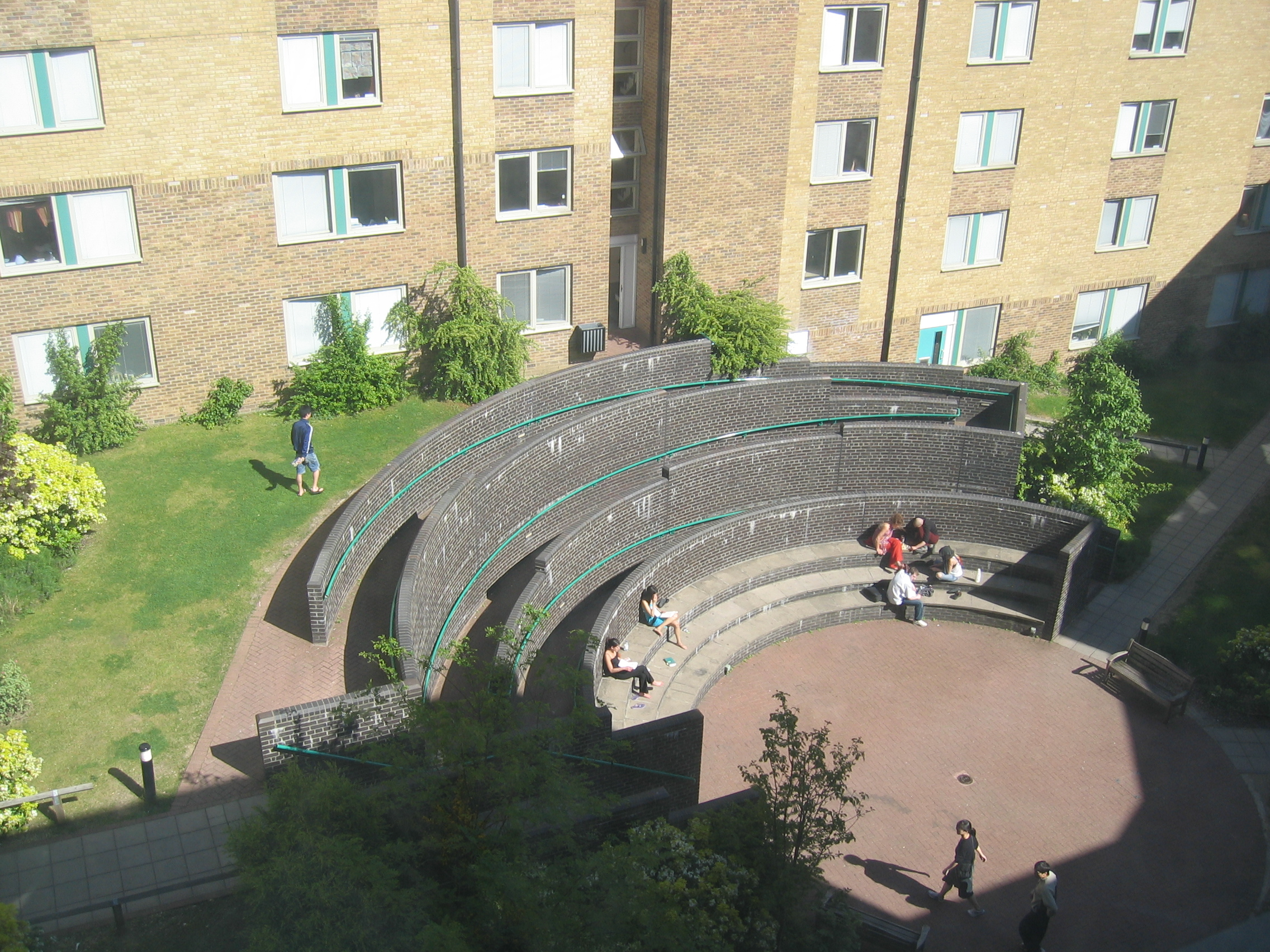
The courtyard of Dinwiddy House

SOAS operates two halls of residence in central London, both owned by Sanctuary Student Housing. The primary accommodation for undergraduates is Dinwiddy House, which is located on Pentonville Road. This contains 510 single en-suite rooms arranged in small cluster flats of around six rooms each. The halls are located within minutes of King's Cross St Pancras tube station and the Vernon Square campus.

A few minutes walk from Dinwiddy House and also on the Pentonville Road is Paul Robeson House, the second hall of residence. This was opened in 1998, and is named after the African-American musician Paul Robeson who studied at SOAS in the 1930s. This accommodation is occupied by postgraduate students, and those attending the international SOAS Summer schools.

SOAS students are eligible to apply for places in the University of London intercollegiate halls of residence. The majority of these are based in Bloomsbury such as Canterbury Hall, Commonwealth Hall, College Hall, Connaught Hall, Hughes Parry Hall, International Hall and International Students House, while further afield are Nutford House in Marble Arch and Lillian Penson Hall in Paddington. A number of SOAS postgraduate students also apply for student accommodation at Goodenough College. Wood Green Hall is another accommodation in North London that reserves places for SOAS students annually.

== Notable people ==
=== Notable alumni ===
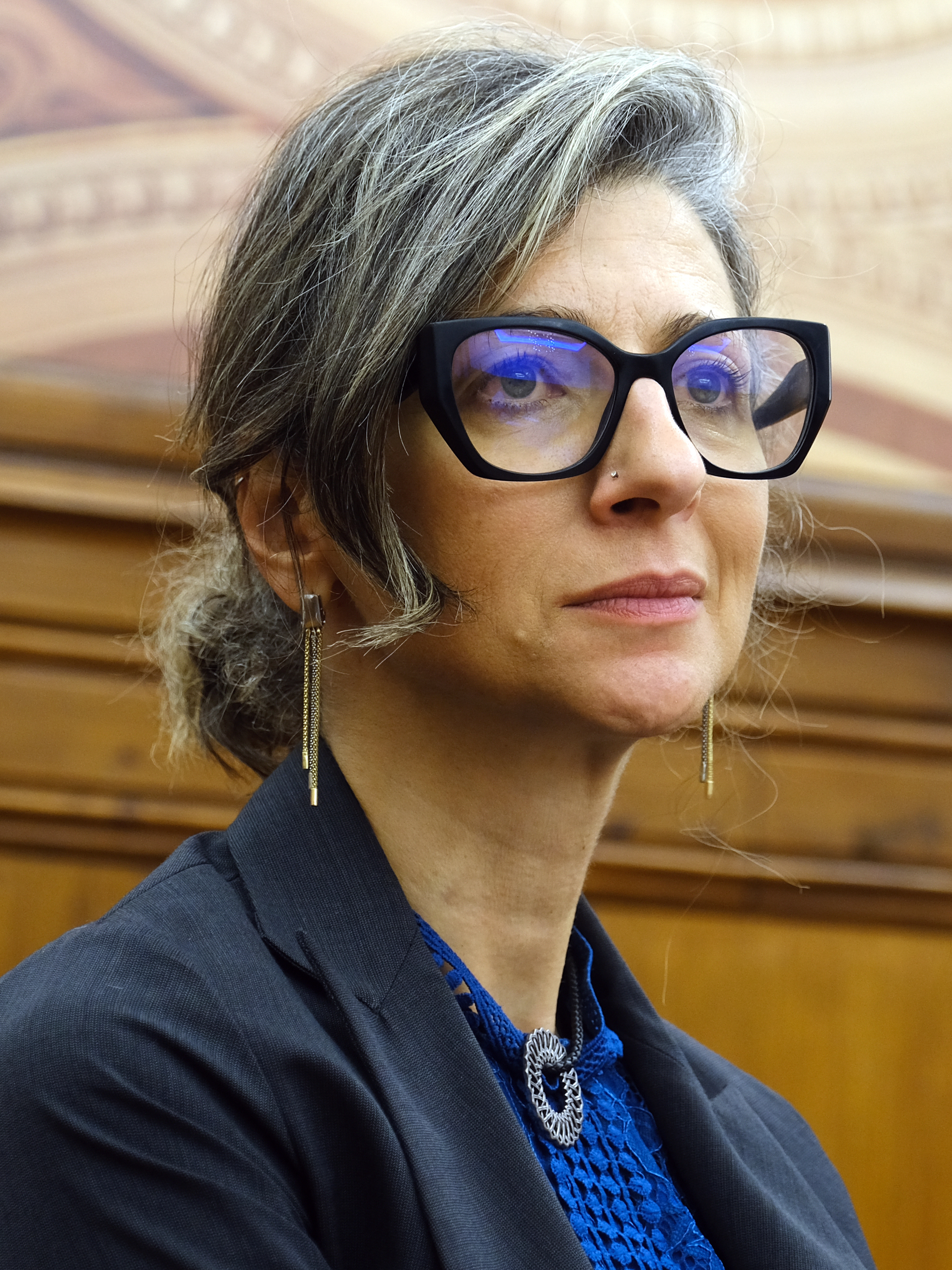
Francesca Albanese, human rights lawyer and UN Special Rapporteur on the occupied Palestinian territories

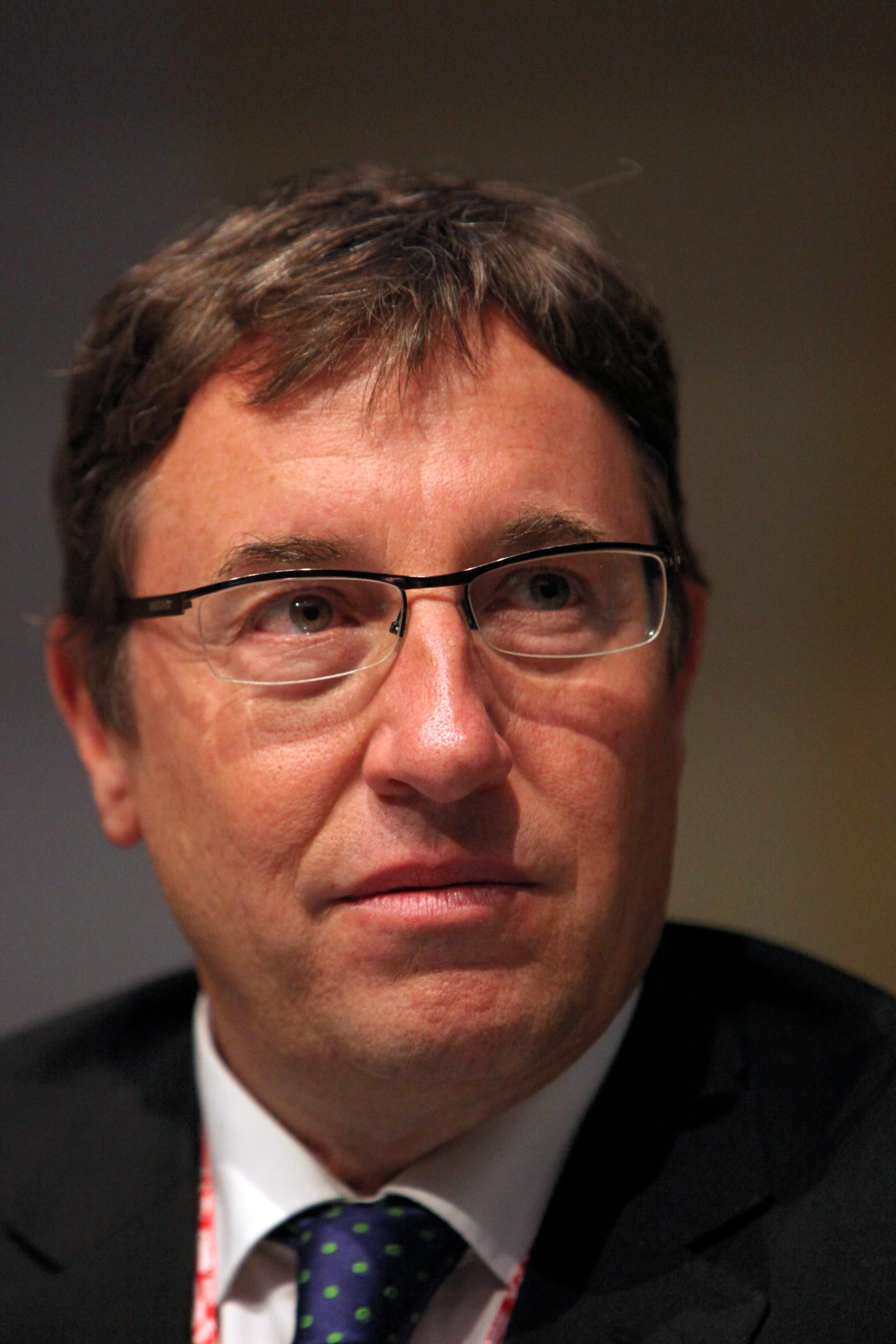
Achim Steiner, Administrator of the UNDP

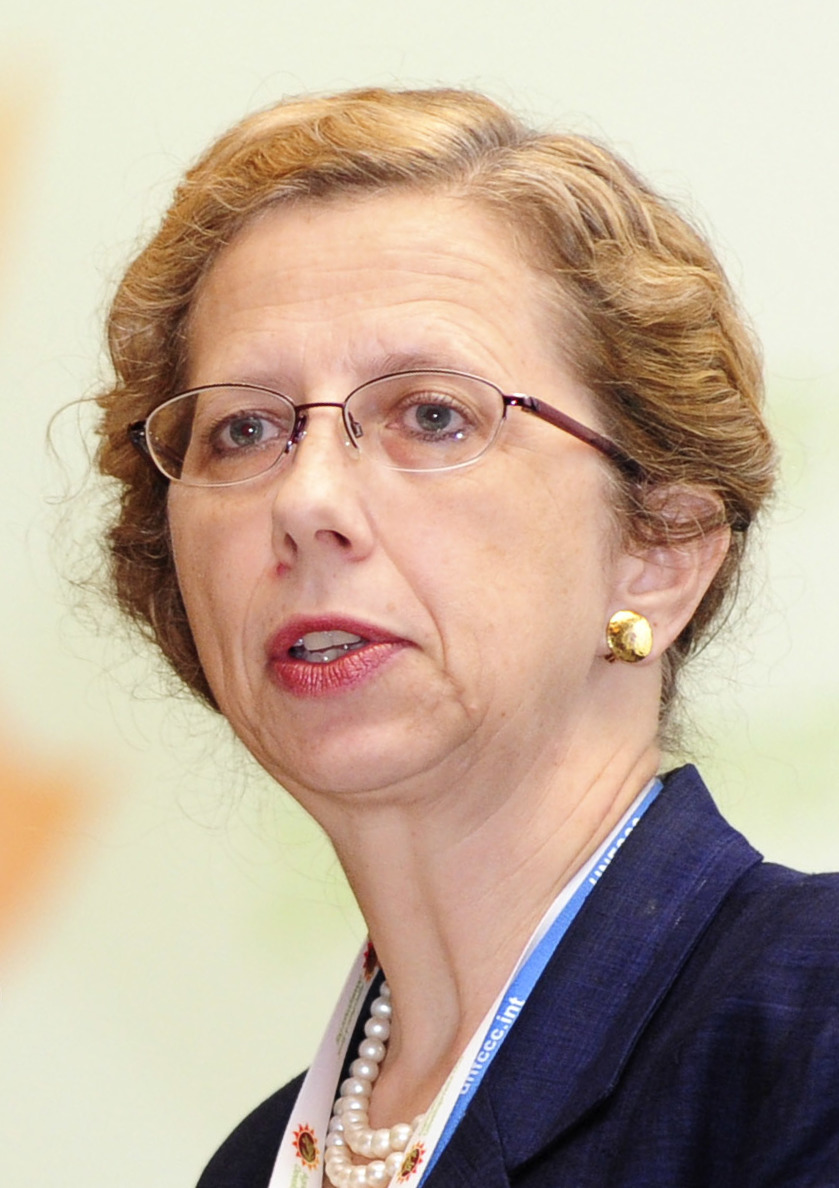
Inger Andersen, executive director of the UNEP

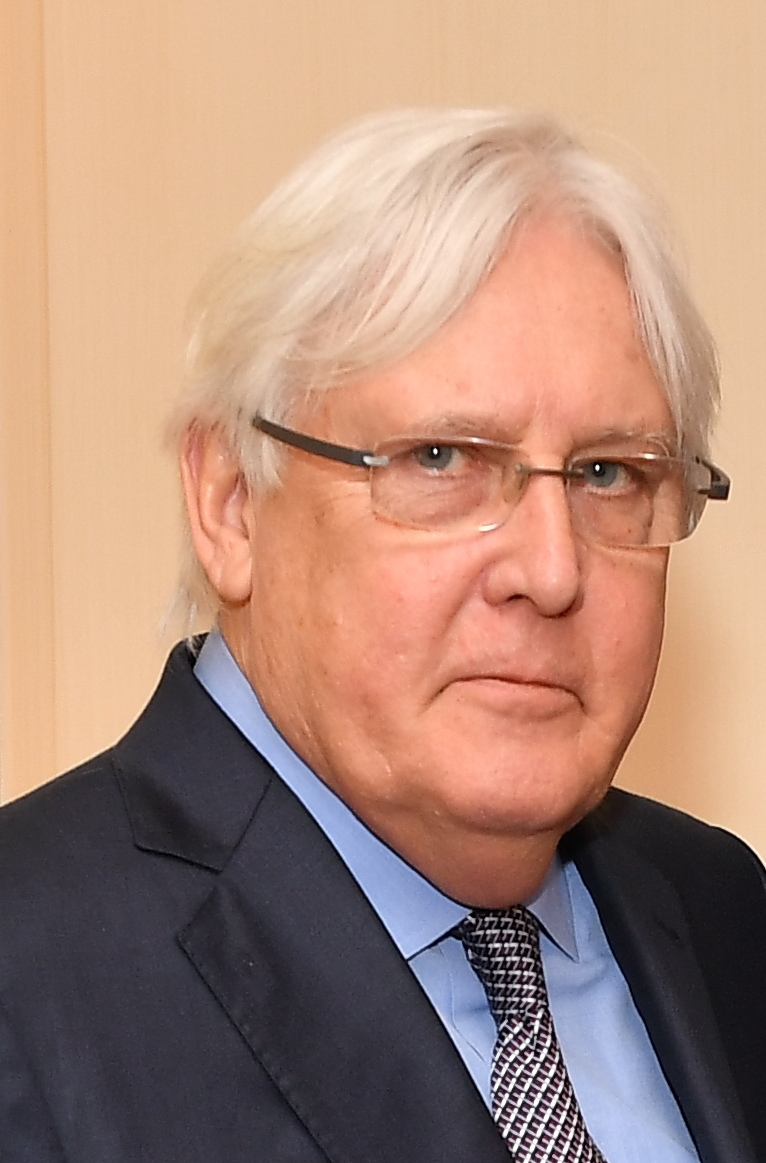
Martin Griffiths, former Under-Secretary-General for Humanitarian Affairs

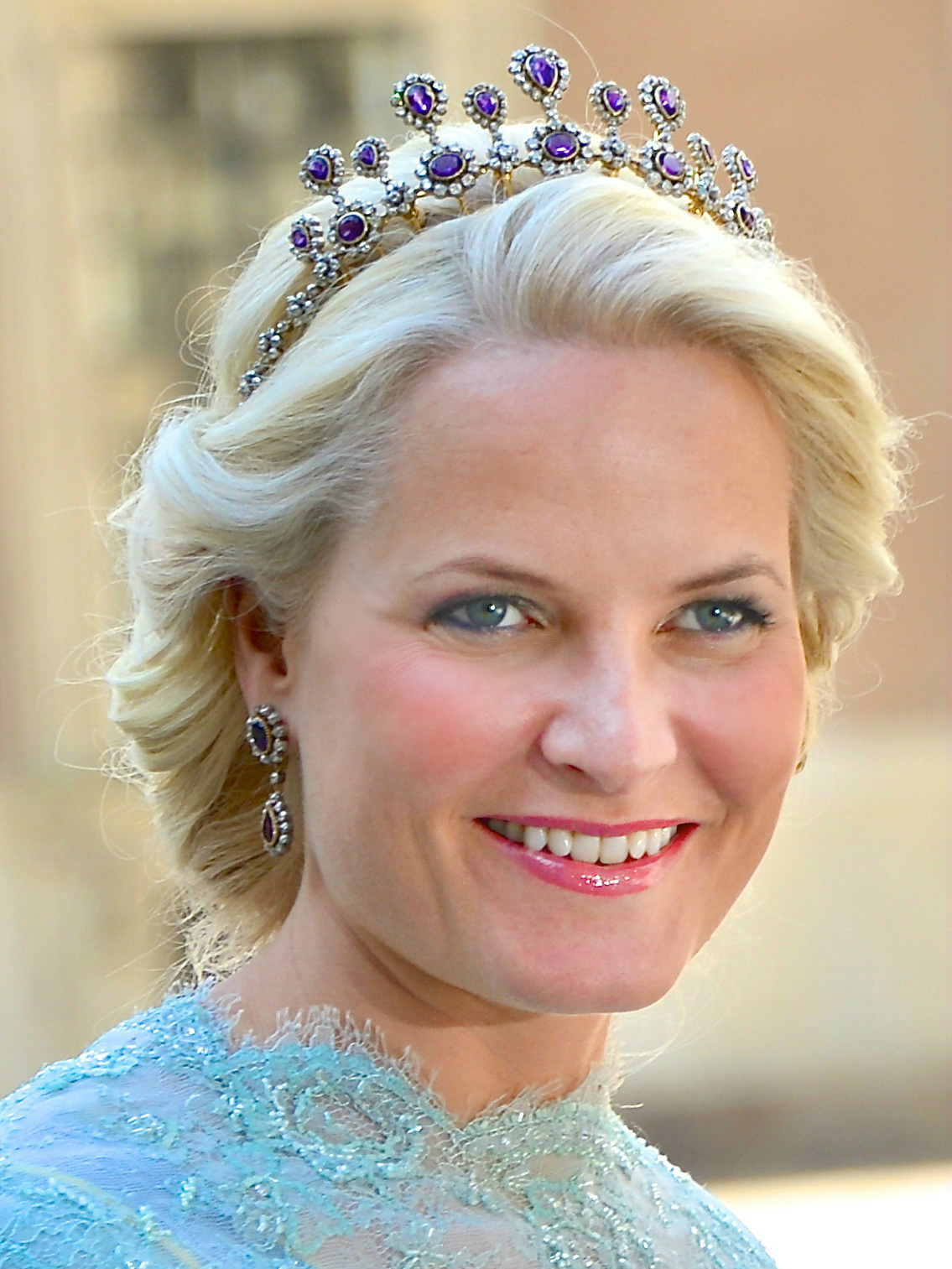
Mette-Marit, Queen of Norway

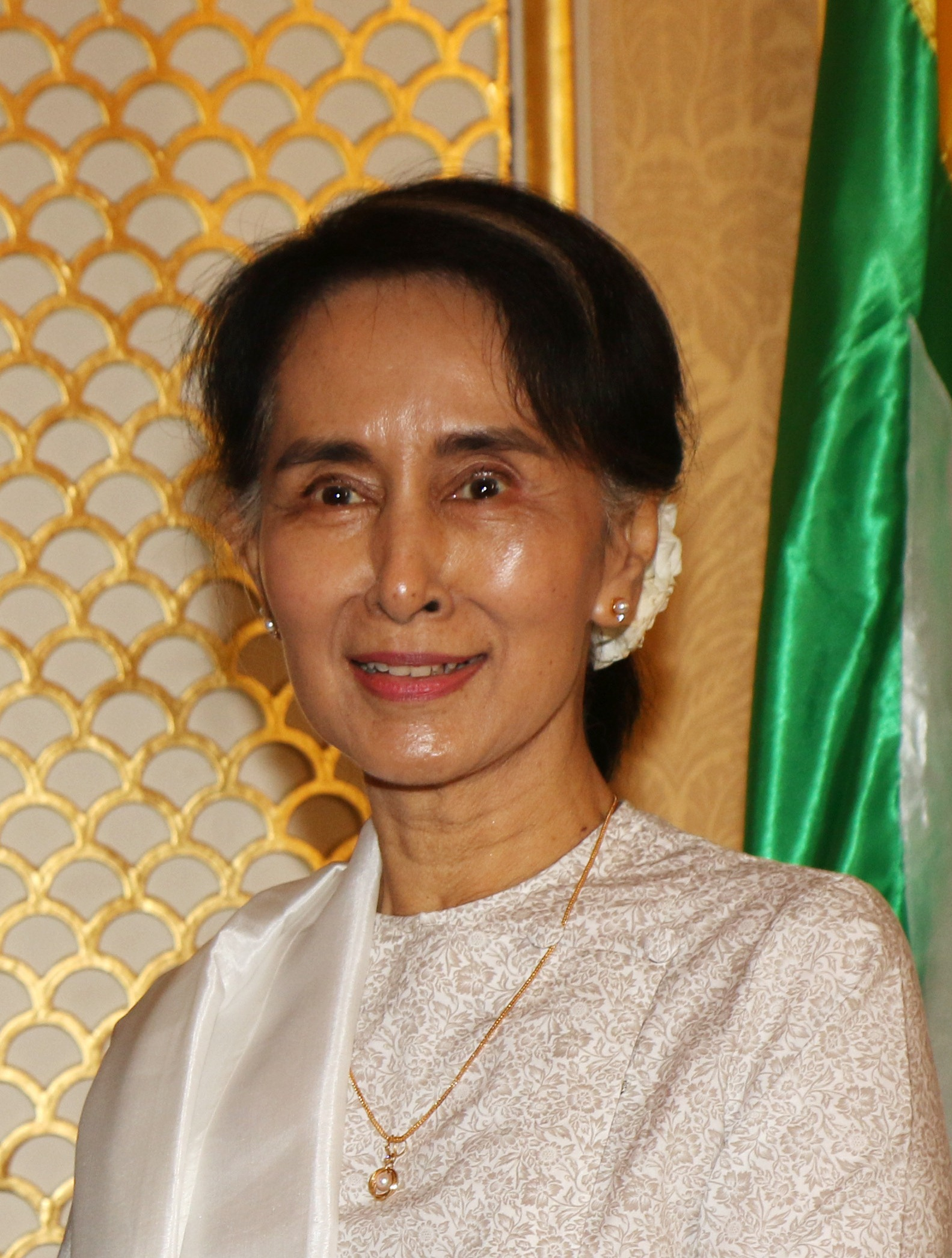
Aung San Suu Kyi, 1st State Counsellor of Myanmar

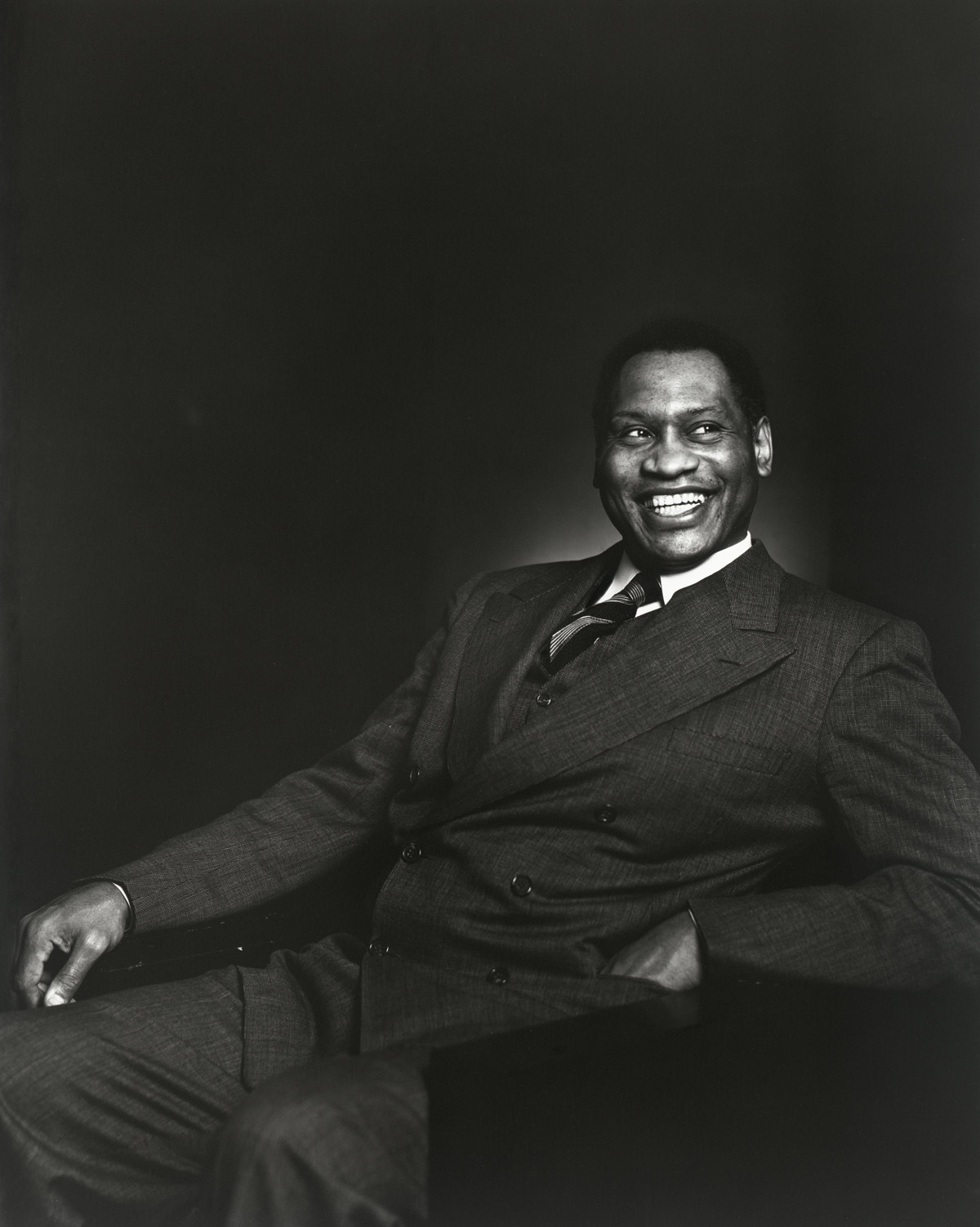
Paul Robeson, American singer

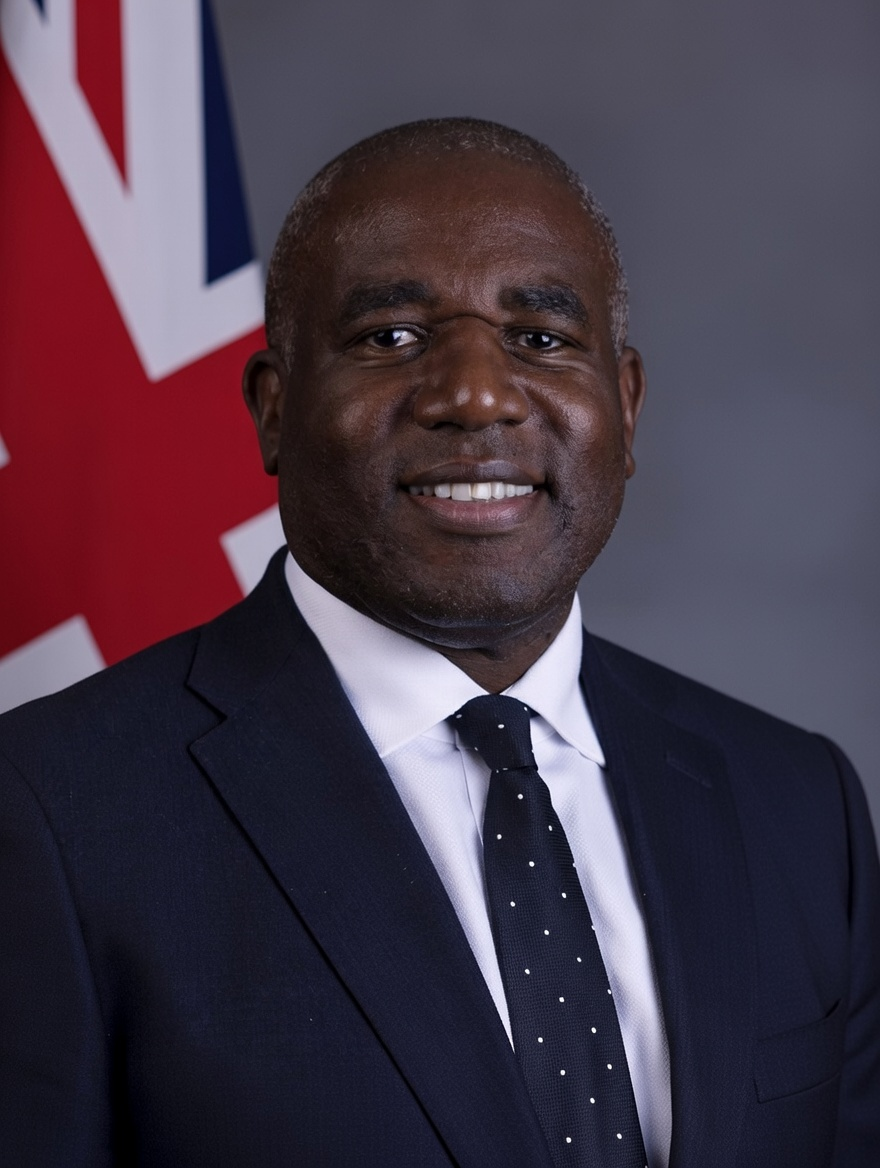
David Lammy, former Deputy Prime Minister of the United Kingdom

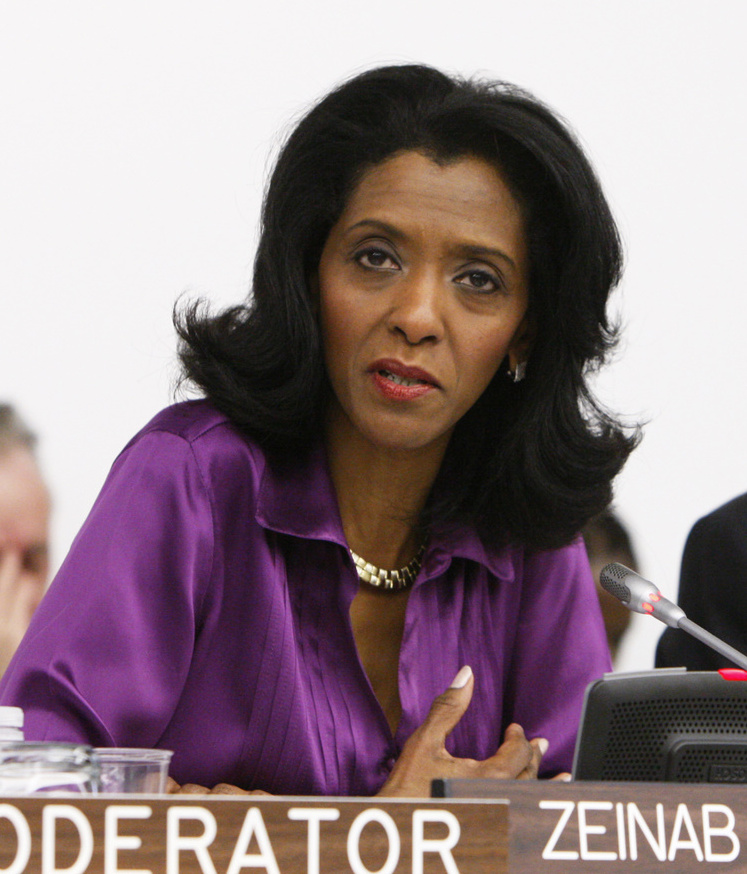
Zeinab Badawi, TV presenter

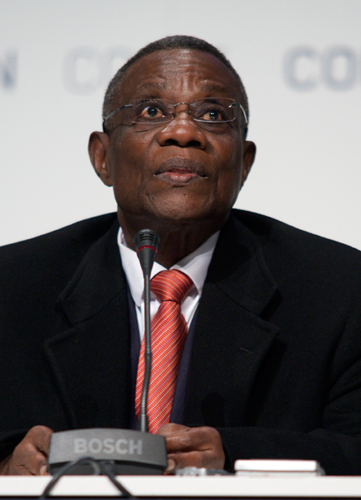
John Atta Mills, former President of Ghana

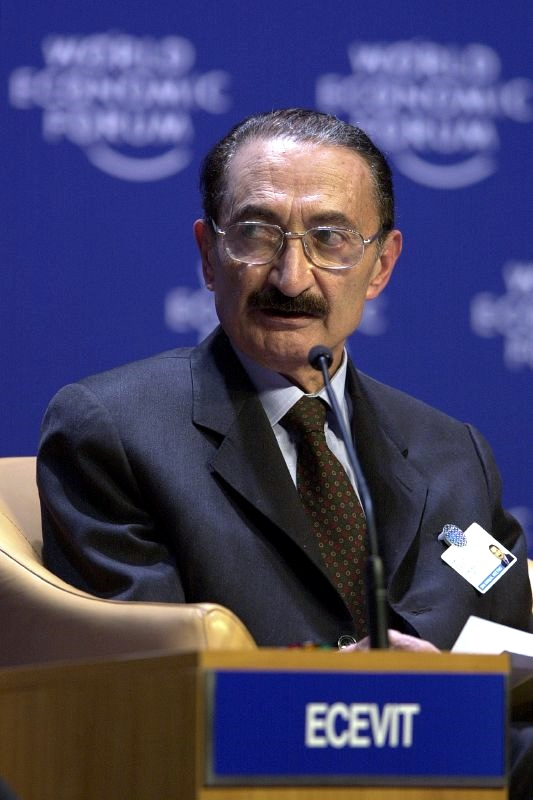
Bülent Ecevit, former Prime Minister of Turkey

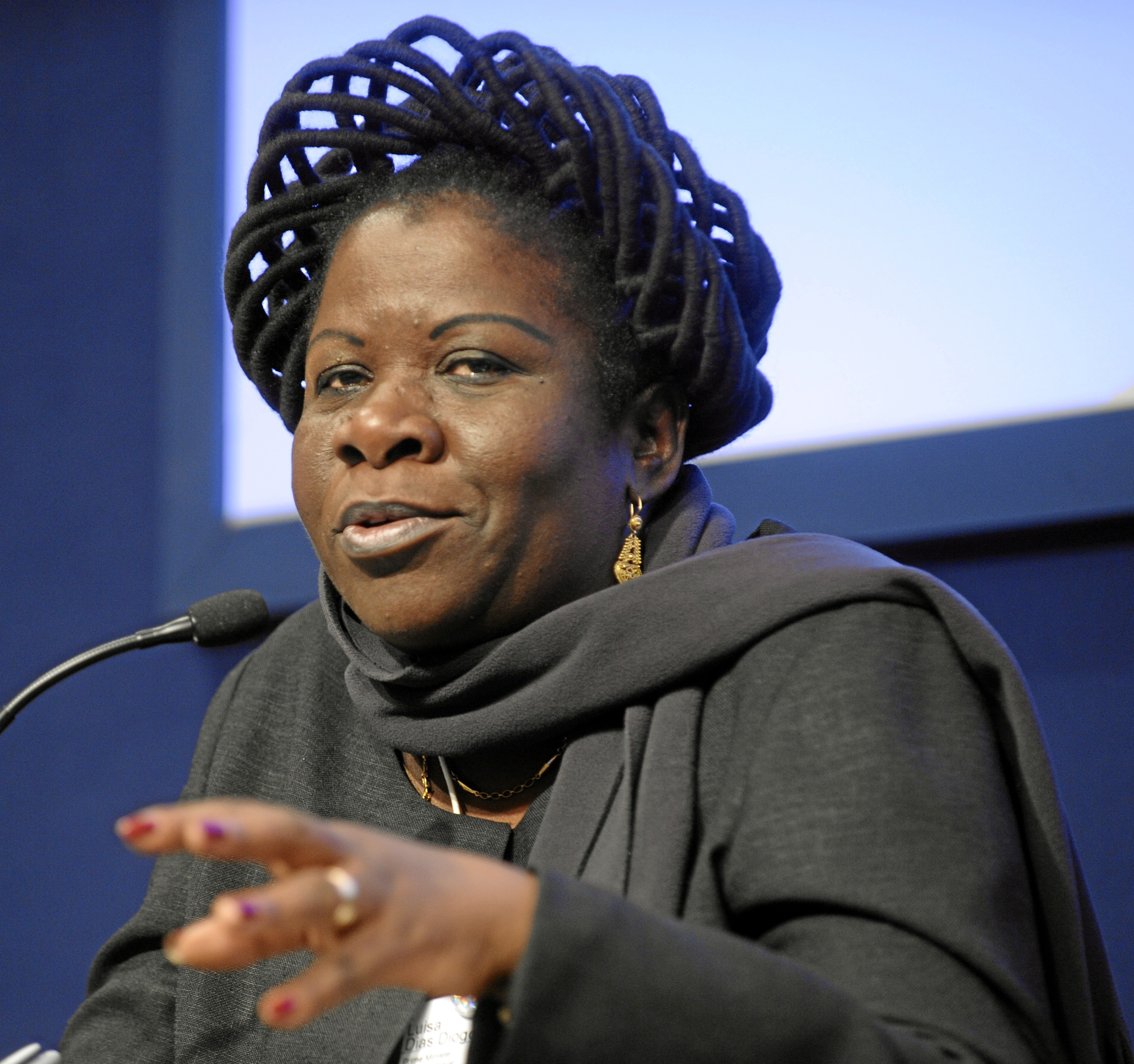
Luisa Dias Diogo, former Prime Minister of Mozambique

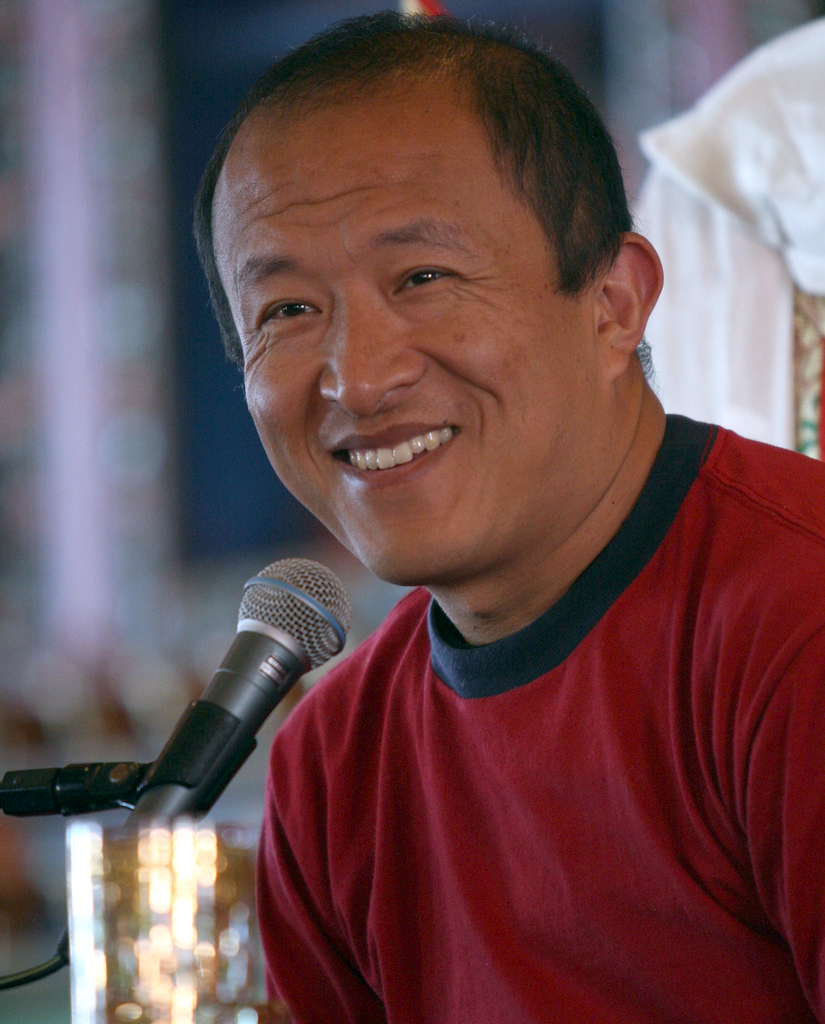
Dzongsar Jamyang Khyentse Rinpoche, Bhutanese lama and filmmaker

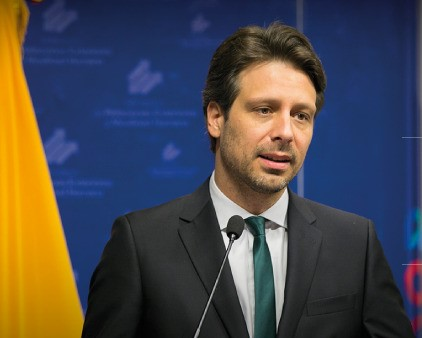
Guillaume Long, former Foreign Minister of Ecuador

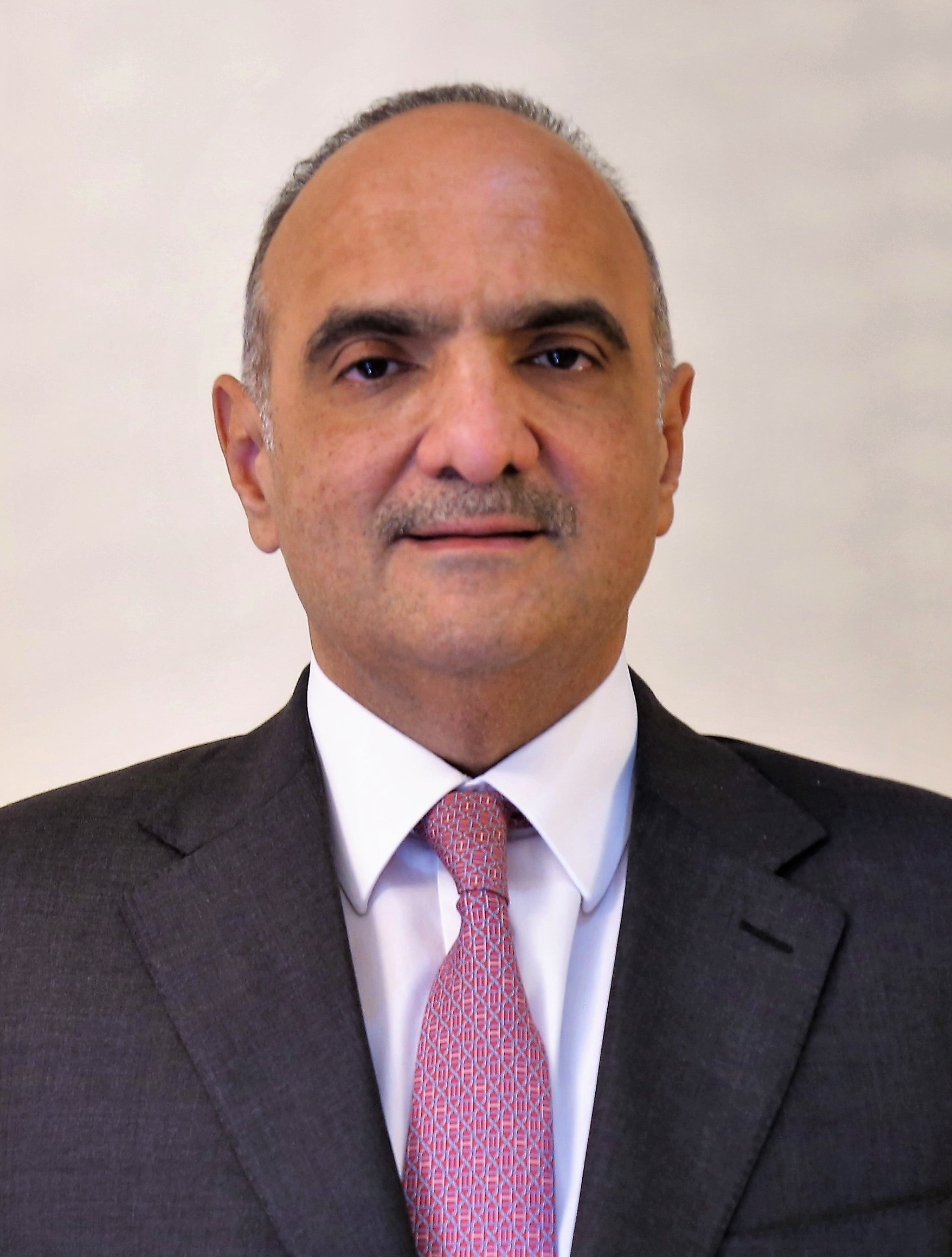
Bisher Al-Khasawneh, former Prime Minister of Jordan

Around the world, several national leaders and political figures are alumni: Aung San Suu Kyi, Nobel Peace Prize laureate and First and incumbent State Counsellor of Myanmar, Zairil Khir Johari, Member of the Malaysian Parliament

- In government, alumni include Dharma Vira, who served as 8th Cabinet Secretary of India, Johnnie Carson, former US Ambassador to Kenya, Zimbabwe and Uganda, Hassan Taqizadeh, Iranian Ambassador to the UK, Sir Shridath Ramphal, Secretary-General of the Commonwealth, Sir Leslie Fielding, British diplomat and former European Commission Ambassador to Tokyo, Sir David Warren, former UK Ambassador to Japan, Quinton Quayle, UK Ambassador to Thailand and Lao, Sir Robin McLaren, UK Ambassador to China and the Philippines, Sir Michael Weir, UK Ambassador to Egypt, Jemima Khan, UK Ambassador to UNICEF, Hugh Carless, UK Ambassador to Venezuela,
- Prominent journalists and broadcasters such as, Abdel Bari Atwan, editor-in-chief of Al-Quds Al-Arabi newspaper in London, Zeinab Badawi, presenter of BBC World News Today, Peter Barakan, longtime radio DJ and TV presenter for NHK FM and NHK World, Martin Bright, political editor of the Jewish Chronicle, Jung Chang, who is best known for her family autobiography Wild Swans, Hossein Derakhshan, Iranian blogger credited with starting the blogging revolution in Iran, Memoirist, freelance journalist, and crime writer Edward Chisholm is an alumnus.
- In business, alumni include: Fred Eychaner, American businessman and philanthropist

== See also ==
- Armorial of UK universities
- List of universities in the UK
