= Tim Lankester =

British economist

Sir Timothy Patrick Lankester, KCB (born 15 April 1942) is a retired British civil servant, a former President of Corpus Christi College, Oxford, and the first economic private secretary to Margaret Thatcher.

Lankester is the son of Preb. Robin Prior Archibald Lankester and Jean Dorothy Gilliat. He was educated at Monkton Combe School in Somerset. After undertaking Voluntary Service Overseas in British Honduras (1960–61), he went up to St John's College, Cambridge (BA Economics, MA, Honorary Fellow), before completing an MA at Yale University.

He worked for the World Bank, first in Washington, D.C., then in New Delhi (1970–73). From 1973 until 1995, he worked in the British Civil Service. He was Permanent Secretary at the Overseas Development Administration from 1989 until 1994. He left the British Civil Service after a brief spell in the Department for Education.

Lankester sits on the board of the Aga Khan Foundation and the MBI Al Jaber Foundation in the UK.

He was Director and Principal of the School of Oriental and African Studies, University of London from 1996 until 2000 and made an Honorary Fellow in 2002. He became President of Corpus Christi College, Oxford in 2001 and retired in 2009.

Lankester is Chairman of the Council of the London School of Hygiene and Tropical Medicine and a member of the joint advisory board of the Georgetown University School of Foreign Service in Qatar. He is also Chair of the Wells Maltings Trust, Wells-next-the-Sea, Norfolk.

== Honours ==
Lankester was appointed Knight Commander of the Most Honourable Order of the Bath in 1994.

== Publications ==
- Lankester, T. (2024). Inside Thatcher’s Monetarism Experiment. Bristol University Press.
- Lankester, T. (2013). The politics and economics of Britain's foreign aid: the Pergau Dam affair. London, Routledge.
- Lankester, T. (2005). International Aid Experience, prospects and the moral case. Cultura. 2, 131-153.
- Lankester, T. (2004). 'Asian drama': the pursuit of modernisation in India and Indonesia. Asian Affairs. 35, 291–304.
- Lankester, T. (1993). Twenty five years of development: a perspective from the Overseas development administration. Norwich, University of East Anglia. School of Development Studies.

== Sources and further information ==
- Corpus Christi College, Oxford
- School of Oriental and African Studies
- Aga Khan Development Network

Government offices
Preceded by Sir Geoffrey Holland	Permanent Secretary of the Department for Education; 1994–1995	Succeeded by Sir Michael Bichard as Permanent Secretary, Department for Education and Employment
Academic offices
Preceded by Sir Michael McWilliam	Director of SOAS University of London; 1996–2001	Succeeded by Colin Bundy
Preceded by Keith Thomas	President of Corpus Christi College, Oxford; 2001–2009	Succeeded by Richard Carwardine
New title	Principal of Green Templeton College, Oxford; 2008–2010	Succeeded by Sir David Watson
