= Jeremy Cowan =

British historian

Professor Jeremy Cowan CBE
- Born: Charles Donald Cowan; 18 November 1923
- Died: 3 September 2013 (aged 89)
- Other name: C. D. Cowan
- Occupation: Academic
- Known for: Director of SOAS University of London

Academic work
- Discipline: Historian
- Sub-discipline: Modern history
- Institutions: SOAS University of London
- Main interests: Modern Southeast Asia

Charles D. Cowan (1923–2013), normally known as Jeremy Cowan, was a British historian and academic administrator. He was the Director of the School of Oriental and African Studies in London during 1976–1989.

Jeremy Cowan was a historian of modern Southeast Asia. Under Cowan's leadership at SOAS, a Japan Research Centre was founded in 1978, a Centre of Music Studies in 1979, and a Centre for Art and Archaeology in 1981. As Director of SOAS, he had to deal with state funding cuts under the Margaret Thatcher government in the early 1980s, and many scholars were lost from the institution as a result. In 1986, the Parker Report, commissioned by the UK University Grants Committee to assess Asian and African study needs, criticized these cuts. Thus, in 1987–88, funding was provided for 18 new posts together with additional library support.

Cowan's portrait was painted by Richard Stone. He was awarded a CBE.

== Books ==
- Cowan, C.D. (1962). Nineteenth Century Malaya The Origins of British Political Control. Oxford University Press.
- Cowan, C.D. (1963). South East Asian History in London (Inaugural Lecture). University of London S.O.A.S. ISBN 978-0901877550.
- Cowan, C.D., ed. (2005). The Economic Development of China and Japan. Routledge. ISBN 978-0415381512.

Academic offices
Preceded by Cyril Philips	Director of SOAS University of London; 1976–1989	Succeeded by Michael McWilliam
