= Michael McWilliam =

British banker and academic administrator

Sir Michael McWilliam KCMG, MA, BLitt
- Born: 21 June 1933 (age 93); Kericho, Kenya
- Education: Oriel College, Oxford; Nuffield College, Oxford
- Occupations: Banker; Academic administrator Historian
- Employer(s): Standard Chartered Bank; SOAS University of London
- Known for: Director of SOAS University of London
- Board member of: Commonwealth Development Corporation

Michael McWilliam (born 1933) is a former British banker, academic administrator, and historian. He was the Director of the School of Oriental and African Studies in London during 1989–1996.

McWilliam was born in Kenya on a tea estate. His father was Douglas Sidney McWilliam (1904–1969), who worked for the Kenya Tea Company. He was educated in Cheltenham and then at the University of Oxford, graduated from Oriel College and Nuffield College. After his education, he returned to Africa, initially to the Northern Rhodesia Copperbelt. During 1956–7, he undertook research in East Africa, funded through a Rockefeller Foundation grant via Nuffield College, Oxford and further funding from the Tea Board of Kenya. He moved to the Kenya Treasury in 1958.

Later, McWilliam worked in banking, becoming the chief executive of the Standard Chartered Bank in the City of London. He then became the Director of the School of Oriental and African Studies (SOAS). During his time at SOAS, the Department of Music was founded in 1988. Though his career, he maintained an interest in the British Commonwealth, with roles in a number of related organisations, including as a Board member of the Commonwealth Development Corporation in the 1990s. During 1998–2012, he was Chairman of the Centre for the Study of African Economies in Oxford. He was also concurrently Chairman of the Cheltenham Festivals during 2007–2011.

McWilliam was awarded a Knight Commander of the Order of St Michael and St George (KCMG) in 1996 on his retirement. His portrait was painted by Aldo Balding in 2014. He has archive material in the Bodleian Library at the University of Oxford, donated in 2020. He is an Honorary Fellow of Oriel College, Oxford.

== Books ==
- McWilliam, Michael (2001). The Development Business: A History of the Commonwealth Development Corporation. Palgrave MacMillan.
- McWilliam, Michael (2020). Simba Chai: The Kenya tea industry. Prepare to Publish. ISBN 978-1905315154.
- McWilliam, Michael (2022). Finding Home: A memoir. Penhaligon Press. ISBN 978-1914076305.

Academic offices
Preceded by Jeremy Cowan	Director of SOAS University of London; 1989–1996	Succeeded by Sir Tim Lankester
