= Colin Bundy =

South African historian and academic administrator

Colin James Bundy (born 4 October 1944) is a South African historian, former principal of Green Templeton College, Oxford and former SOAS University of London director. Bundy was an influential member of a generation of historians who substantially revised our understanding of South African history. In particular, he wrote on South Africa's rural past from a predominantly Marxist perspective, but also deploying Africanist and underdevelopment theories. Since the mid-1990s, however, Bundy has held a series of posts in university administration. Bundy is also a trustee of the Canon Collins Educational & Legal Assistance Trust.

== Education ==
He received his secondary education at Graeme College, Grahamstown in the Eastern Cape Province.

Bundy was educated at the University of Natal (B.A.) and the University of the Witwatersrand (B.A. (Hons)). He was then a Rhodes Scholar at Merton College, Oxford (1968–70) and a Beit Senior Research Scholar at St Antony's (1970–72), graduating as an M.Phil. and D.Phil. of the University of Oxford with a thesis entitled African Peasants and Economic Change in South Africa, 1870–1913, with Particular Reference to the Cape (Thesis). University of Oxford. 1976.

== Career ==
Bundy was director and principal of the School of Oriental and African Studies (2001–06); deputy vice-chancellor of the University of London (2003–06); vice-chancellor and principal of the University of the Witwatersrand (1997-2001); and director of the Institute for Historical Research (1992–94) and vice-rector (1994-97), University of the Western Cape.

He returned to Oxford as a research fellow at Queen Elizabeth House (1979–80) and in the Department for External Studies (1980–84), subsequently being elected an honorary fellow of Kellogg College. From 2006 until 2008, he was warden of Green College, Oxford, becoming the first principal of Green Templeton College on 1 October 2008, when Green College merged with Templeton College. He retired from this position on 1 October 2010.

National Life Stories conducted an oral history interview (C1149/14) with Colin Bundy in 2010 for its Oral History of Oral History collection held by the British Library.

He is an Honorary Fellow of St Edmund's College, Cambridge.

== Publications ==
His publications include:

- "Land and Liberation: The South African National Liberation Movements and the Agrarian Question, 1920s-1960s". Review of African Political Economy. 11 (129): 14–29. 1984. doi:10.1080/03056248408703565. Archived from the original on 3 March 2016.
- History, revolution, and South Africa. University of Cape Town. 1987. ISBN 9780799211047.
- Remaking the Past: New Perspectives in South African History (Cape Town: University of Cape Town, 1987)
- Hidden Struggles in Rural South Africa: Politics & Popular Movements in the Transkei & Eastern Cape, 1890-1930. University of California Press. 1987. ISBN 978-0-520-05780-7. (with William Beinart)
- The Rise and Fall of the South African Peasantry. James Currey Publishers. 1988. ISBN 978-0-85255-047-2.
- The History of the South African Communist Party. University of Cape Town, Department of Adult Education and Extra-Mural Studies. 1991. ISBN 978-0-7992-1334-8.

Academic offices
| Preceded by Robert Charlton | Vice-Chancellor of the University of the Witwatersrand; 1997–2001 | Succeeded by Norma Reid Birley |
| Preceded by Tim Lankester | Director of SOAS University of London; 2001–2006 | Succeeded by Paul Webley |
| New title | Principal of Green Templeton College, Oxford; 2008–2010 | Succeeded by Sir David Watson |
