= Man and the Natural World =

Book by Keith Thomas

- Author: Keith Thomas
- Publication date: 1983

Man and the Natural World. Changing Attitudes in England 1500–1800 by historian Keith Thomas was originally published in Great Britain by Allen Lane in 1983.

== Outline ==
- Anthropocentric worldview. The first chapter introduces us to the extreme human-centred view of the natural world in early modern England. This view had theological foundations and roots in Greek philosophers such as Aristotle. All things were created for the benefit and pleasure of man. Wild animals, birds and fish are God's gift to all men. Plants were created by God for the sake of animals and animals for the sake of men and thus humans may lawfully kill animals. Cattle and sheep had only been given life in the first place to keep their meat fresh "till we shall have need to eat them". Furthermore, they were better off in man's care than left to the mercy of wild predators. If not for food, animals were created for moral or aesthetic purposes. The louse, for example, was created to provide "a powerful incentive to habits of cleanliness". Weeds exercised "the industry of man to weed them out". The purpose of singing-birds was to entertain mankind. No animal or plant existed for itself. This worldview was all-embracing and unquestioned at the time. Only after travellers came back with stories about the respectful treatment of animals by Buddhists and Hindus, an alternative worldview was possible in theory. But the general reaction was of baffled contempt. Humans are superior, animals are inferior.
- Human uniqueness. One of the pillars of the anthropocentric world view was the biblical view of human uniqueness. Humans are superior because humans have an immortal soul. There is an absolute and fixed barrier between humans and animals. This doctrine was reinforced by the philosophy of René Descartes (1630s onwards), who held that animals were machines and could not feel pain.

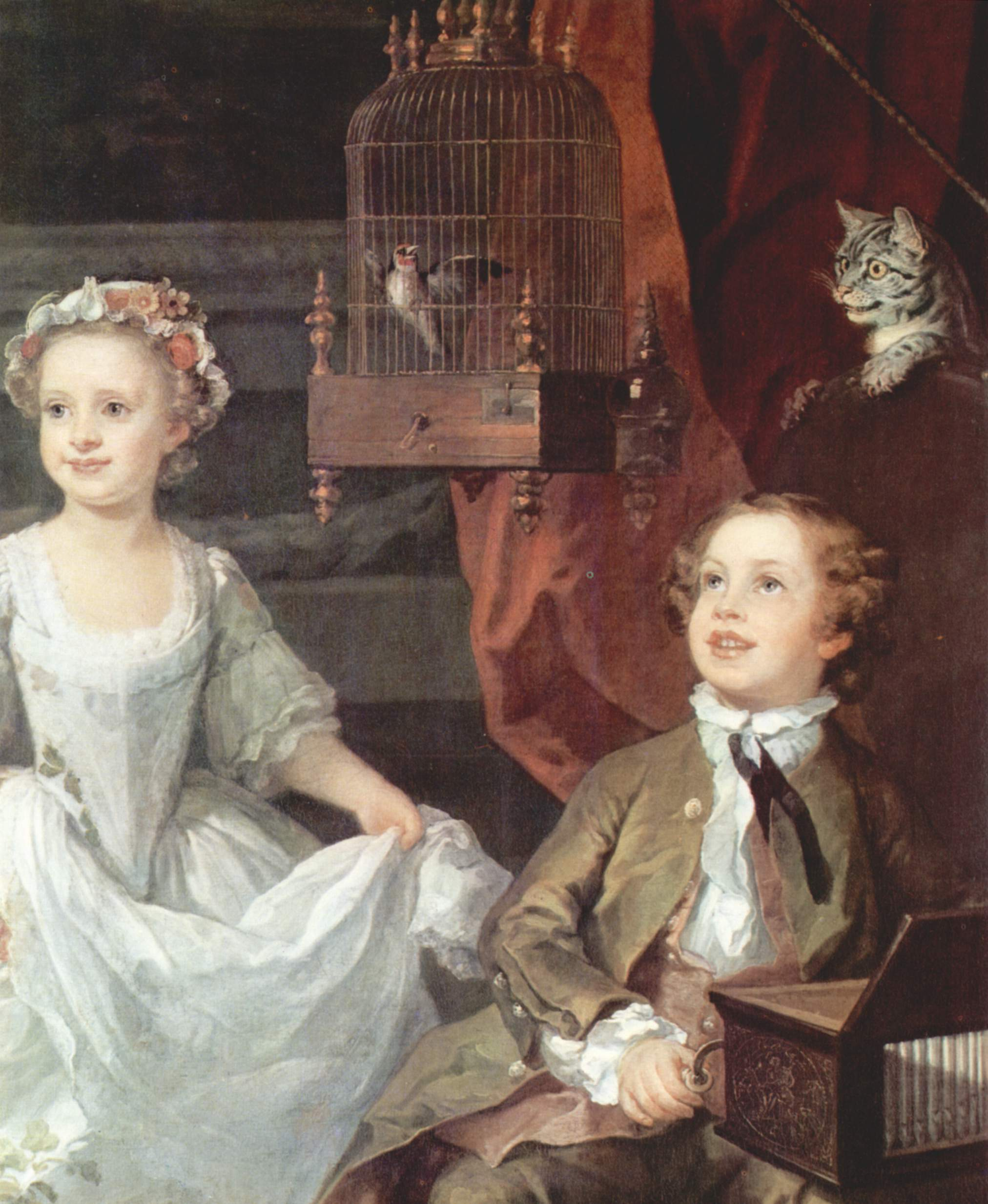
Children with cat and cage-bird, 1742. The bird is probably a goldfinch.

- Influence of botanists and zoologists. The rise of natural history helped to undermine this anthropocentric view. Anthropocentric classifications such as edible-inedible, useful-useless animals were gradually being replaced by more objective classifications based on observational criteria. That was real progress because old classifications were highly arbitrary and had harmful effects on wild animals. jays, woodpecker, worms, wrens and squirrels were targeted in particular. On the other hand, in some parts of England the robin and swallow were more or less sacred and treated with respect. The naturalists of the 17th century were beginning to study plants and animals for their own sake, independent of their utility or meaning for man.
- Pets narrowing the gap. In the 16th and 17th centuries pets had established themselves in the English households for company, especially in towns. Not only dogs and cats, but also pet monkeys, tortoises, otters, rabbits, squirrels and songbirds such as canaries, nightingales, goldfinches, larks, linnets, parrots, magpies and jackdaws. In the 18th century pets were given human names, and were never eaten. Observation of pets provided support for the view that pets could be intelligent, sensitive, responsive and almost every other human quality. All this helped to break down the absolute gap between animals and humans.
- Cruelty to animals. Cruelty to animals (bull-baiting, cockfighting, mistreatment of donkeys, horses) was almost universal in England before 1700. However, attitudes to cruelty were changing. Already theologian John Calvin, still firmly within the anthropocentric tradition, remembered that animals, like men, were part of God's creation, and were created for Man's sake, but we should handle them gently. From the 1740s onwards, there was a growing stream of writings by philosophers, scientists, and poets attacking cruelty, culminating in the foundation of the Royal Society for the Prevention of Cruelty to Animals (RSPCA) in 1824. Man was fully entitled to domesticate animals and to kill them for food and clothing, but to cause unnecessary suffering was morally wrong. Quakers forbid hunting for sport altogether. Jeremy Bentham in 1789 focused his thinking on the idea whether animals could suffer.
- Influence of astronomers and geologists. Astronomers and geologists too had a profound effect on changing attitudes, just like botanists and zoologists did earlier. As astronomers revealed that the earth was not the centre of the universe, it became increasingly hard to maintain that the universe was exclusively created for humans. Geologists discovered that the earth must have existed 'some 70.000 years' before the appearance of man. So, what was the point of an Earth without Man? If the universe and the earth were not specially created for humans, why would animals and plants be specially created for man?
- Attitudes to trees and flowers. Initially, the forest had been seen as wild and hostile, providing shelter for dangerous wild beasts and a refuge for outlaws. It was believed that the first human beings were 'woodland men', homines sylvestres. The progress of mankind was from the forest to the field. This resulted in large-scale forest clearance. Woodlands became a resource for shipbuilding. Between 1500 and 1700 the number of trees was substantially reduced. Later forests became 'romantic', they added beauty and dignity to the scene. Private landowners planted some 50,000,000 timber trees between 1760 and 1835. New exotic species were imported. Flowers were grown not because they were medicinally useful or symbolically meaningful, but because they were aesthetically pleasing. Flowers were imported from all over the world.
- Attitudes to nature. Mountains are a good example of changing attitudes to nature. In the mid-17th century mountains were hated as barren 'deformities', 'monstrous excrescences', 'rubbish of the earth', useless, unproductive and dangerous for men. Then theologians remembered that all God's works served a purpose, and that the purpose of mountains was supplying rivers with water and offering a home for goats. A century later mountains became objects of the highest aesthetic admiration. It was forgotten that mountains are agriculturally unproductive.
- Vegetarianism. The argument against cruelty to animals was carried one step further. Once it was accepted that domesticated animals should be treated with kindness, it seemed increasingly repugnant to kill them for food. Furthermore, the anthropocentric view that animals were made for man became a minority view, and biblical arguments became unconvincing in a secular world. Non-religious arguments were put forward: the slaughter of animals has a brutalising effect upon the human character, because it makes men cruel and ferocious; the consumption of meat is bad for human health because it is physiological unnatural; it inflicts untold suffering upon man's fellow-creatures; stock-breeding is a wasteful form of agriculture compared with arable farming, because crops produce far more food per acre. Despite all these arguments for vegetarianism, England did not become a vegetarian nation. Instead, pigs, calves, hares and rabbits were no longer served at dinner with their heads attached, concealing the true origin of meat, and slaughterhouses were concealed from public view.
- Conclusion. The conflict between new attitudes to nature and the realities of society, with its growing cities and growing population, was not resolved.
  A mixture of compromise and concealment has so far prevented this conflict from having to be fully resolved. It is one of the contradictions upon which modern civilization may be said to rest. About its ultimate consequences we can only speculate.

== Footnotes ==
All page numbers refer to the Penguin paperback 1984 edition.

== Editions ==
- ISBN 9780844669113 Peter Smith Publisher, 1997, hardcover
- ISBN 9780140146868 Penguin Books Ltd, 1984, 1991, paperback
- ISBN 9780141936048 Penguin Books Ltd, 1991, ePub eBook
- ISBN 9780713912272 Viking 1983 hardcover
- ISBN 0-394-49945-X Pantheon 1983 hardcover
