= D. H. Pennington =

Donald Henshaw Pennington (15 June 1919 – 28 December 2007) was a historian of 17th-century England. He taught at Manchester and Oxford universities, becoming a tutor at Balliol College, Oxford in 1965.

Donald was born in Marple, Greater Manchester, near Stockport. His father, Frederick Pennington, was the Headmaster of the Albert Schools in Marple when Donald was born. His mother Gladys (nee Prentice) also taught at Marple School. Donald's mother was a sister of Frederick's first wife, Clara Prentice. Frederick and Clara Prentice were married on 3 August 1905 at Marple, however, Clara died in 1915. Donald's parents were then married in Marple on 30 August 1918. By 1931 his father had become Headmaster of the Willows School.

On the 23 1955 he spoke on a forty five minute radio broadcast programme with Veronica Wedgwood and Hugh Trevor-Roper, about the causes of the English Civil War. There was a follow-up programme broadcast four days later. Winston Churchill also consulted Donald about the origins of the English Civil War. He was rewarded with signed copies of the first two volumes of Churchill's A History of the English-Speaking Peoples.

In 1956 Donald was actively engaged in the work of the National Committee for the Abolition of Nuclear Weapons Tests which was a precursor of the CND. He became a founding member of the Campaign for Nuclear Disarmament (CND) and was involved with that organisation from the outset. Donald served as the north-west regional secretary, and a member of the national executive.

His works include Europe in the Seventeenth Century, Members of the Long Parliament (with D. Bruton) and Puritans and Revolutionaries, Essays Presented to Christopher Hill (with Keith Thomas).
