= Micro-internship =

Freelance internships

A micro-internship or freelance internship is a short-term, paid, professional assignment that is similar to those given to new hires or interns. These roles have surged in popularity as the traditional employment landscape evolves in the face of digital innovation, changing work preferences, and global challenges.

== Overview ==
Micro-internships are typically project-based roles that last anywhere from a few hours to a few weeks. They can span across all departments and functions, from IT and marketing to research and sales. These roles often emerge through digital platforms that connect employers with potential interns, making the matching process more efficient.

== Context ==
The rise of micro-internships can be traced back to the early 2010s. Factors contributing to their rise include:

- Digital Revolution: Platforms such as Upwork, Fiverr, and Freelancer facilitated connections between freelancers and employers, setting a precedent for short-term, flexible roles.
- Economic Shifts: Economic downturns and global challenges made employers wary of long-term commitments, leading to an increased reliance on short-term roles.
- Changing Work Preferences: Millennials and Gen Z increasingly value flexibility and varied experiences, making micro-internships an attractive option.

== See also ==
- Gig worker
- Freelancer
- Remote work
- Digital nomad
