= David Watson (academic) =

British academic and educationalist

Sir David Watson
- Born: David John Watson; 22 March 1949; Broxbourne, England
- Died: 8 February 2015 (aged 65)
- Education: Clare College, Cambridge (BA); University of Pennsylvania (PhD)
- Occupations: Writer and professor of higher education, University of Oxford

Sir David John Watson (22 March 1949 – 8 February 2015) was a British academic and educationalist. He was Director of Brighton Polytechnic from 1990 to 1992 and Vice-Chancellor of its successor the University of Brighton from 1992 to 2005. In 2005 he was appointed Professor of Higher Education Management at the Institute of Education and was Course Director of the Institute's MBA in Higher Education Management. Between 2010 and 2015 he was Principal of Green Templeton College, Oxford and Professor of Higher Education at the University of Oxford.

== Early life and education ==
Watson was born on 22 March 1949 in Broxbourne, England. He was educated at Cheshunt Grammar School before winning a Fleming Scholarship (paid for by Hertfordshire County Council) to attend Eton College. From January 1967-August 1968 he taught at a boy's secondary school in Minaki, Tanzania, returning to the UK to matriculate at Clare College, Cambridge, where he was a choral exhibitioner. He graduated with a first class Bachelor of Arts (BA) degree. He won a Thouron Award to attend the University of Pennsylvania, and graduated with a Doctor of Philosophy (PhD) degree in intellectual history in 1975.

== Career ==
Watson's first post upon returning to the UK in 1975 was at Crewe and Alsager College of Higher Education. His major responsibility was the development of a new suite of courses in the humanities leading first to a Diploma in Higher Education, and then to a BA degree. In 1981 he was appointed Dean of the Modular Course at Oxford Polytechnic and then Deputy Director. In 1990 he was appointed Director of Brighton Polytechnic. In 1992, Brighton Polytechnic was granted university status and Watson became the first Vice-Chancellor of the University of Brighton.

In 2005 Watson retired from the University of Brighton and joined the Institute of Education, then part of the University of London, as Professor of Higher Education, Course Director of its MBA in Higher Education Management and Co-Director of its Centre for Higher Education Studies (CHES).

In 2010, he was elected Principal of Green Templeton College, Oxford. Upon taking up the position, he was also appointed Professor of Higher Education at the University of Oxford.

Watson played a significant role in the development of higher education in the UK, serving on the Council for National Academic Awards (CNAA) (1977-1993) and the Higher Education Funding Council for England (HEFCE) (1992–96) where he chaired its Quality Assessment Committee. He was a member of the Paul Hamlyn Foundation National Commission on Education (1991-1993) and the National Committee of Inquiry into Higher Education, commonly known as the Dearing Committee (1996-1997). He was Honorary President, Society for Research into Higher Education (SRHE) (2005-2012), and Member of the Advisory Board, Higher Education Policy Institute (HEPI) (2002-2013)

Watson’s love of teaching, and his commitment to the importance of lifelong learning led to other significant roles: Chair, Universities Association for Continuing Education (UACE) (1994–98), Chair, Steering Committee for ESRC Teaching and Learning Research Programme (TLRP) (1998-2003), Chair, Advisory Panel for National Teaching Fellowships (2003-2005) and Chair of the Commission of Inquiry into the Future for Lifelong Learning (IFLL) (2007-2009), co-authoring its report Learning Through Life, which was published in 2009. He was a Trustee of the Nuffield Foundation from 2005 to 2015.

== Honours and awards ==
Watson was awarded a knighthood in 1998 for services to higher education. In 2009 he was given the Times Higher Education Lord Dearing Lifetime Achievement Award. He was also the recipient of nine Honorary Doctorates in addition to Honorary Fellowships of Queen Mary University of London and the City and Guilds Institute London, and Honorary Membership of the Royal College of Music.

Following his death, the University of Brighton announced its intention to name a new academic building and library in his honour. The Watson building was rededicated in September 2018.

== Personal life and death ==
Watson was married to Betty Pinto Skolnick whom he met while studying in the USA. They had two children, Sarah and Michael, born in 1980 and 1984. Throughout his life Watson’s two passions were cricket and music. Whether in Cheshire, Oxford or Brighton he always found a cricket team to play for regularly. He was an accomplished pianist and enjoyed serving as repetiteur for the Oxford Operatic Society in the 1980s, giving occasional lunchtime concerts on Brighton’s Falmer campus with Andy Sherwood (violinist and leader of the Brighton Youth Orchestra), or accompanying students who came to the informal musical evenings he and Betty hosted at Green Templeton College.

He was Chair of the South East England Cultural Consortium (SEEC) (1999-2001), Chair of the Brighton Festival (2002-2005), Vice-Chair and Trustee, Friends of the Brighton Pavilion, Museum and Gallery (1998-2005) and Council Member, Royal College of Music (1995-2005).

Watson died on 8 February 2015, shortly after being diagnosed with pancreatic cancer. He was aged 65.

== Selected works ==
Watson was a prolific author; in addition to his own books and those which he edited and co-authored, he also published some 400 monographs and pamphlets, chapters in books, articles and reviews.

- Bines, Hazel; Watson, David (1992). Developing professional education: a polytechnic perspective. Milton Keynes: Society for Research into Higher Education / Open University Press. ISBN 0335097103.
- David Watson (1 April 2007). Managing Civic and Community Engagement. Open University Press. ISBN 978-0335220472.
- David Watson (1 October 2009). The Question of Morale: Searching for Happiness in University Life. Open University Press. ISBN 978-0335235605.
- Schuller, Tom; Watson, David (2009). Learning through life: inquiry into the future for lifelong learning. Leicester: National Institute of Adult Continuing Education. ISBN 978-1862014336.
- David Watson; Robert Hollister; Susan E. Stroud; Elizabeth Babcock (15 February 2013). The Engaged University: International Perspectives on Civic Engagement (International Studies in Higher Education). Routledge. ISBN 978-0415824224.
- David Watson (1 December 2013). The Question of Conscience: Higher education and personal responsibility. Institute of Education Press. ISBN 978-1782770268.

== Collections ==
Watson donated his papers to the University College London Institute of Education during his lifetime. After his death in 2015, his family donated additional material to the collection in 2023. Watson's work with the National Commission on Education and the Teaching, Learning and Research Programme are also archived at the IOE.

Academic offices
New title	Vice-Chancellor of the University of Brighton; 1992 to 2005	Succeeded by Julian Crampton
Preceded by Colin Bundy	Principal of Green Templeton College, Oxford; 2010 to 2015	Succeeded by Denise Lievesley
