= Kya Rosa, University of Pretoria =

Historic university building

Coordinates: 25°45′21″S 28°13′51″E

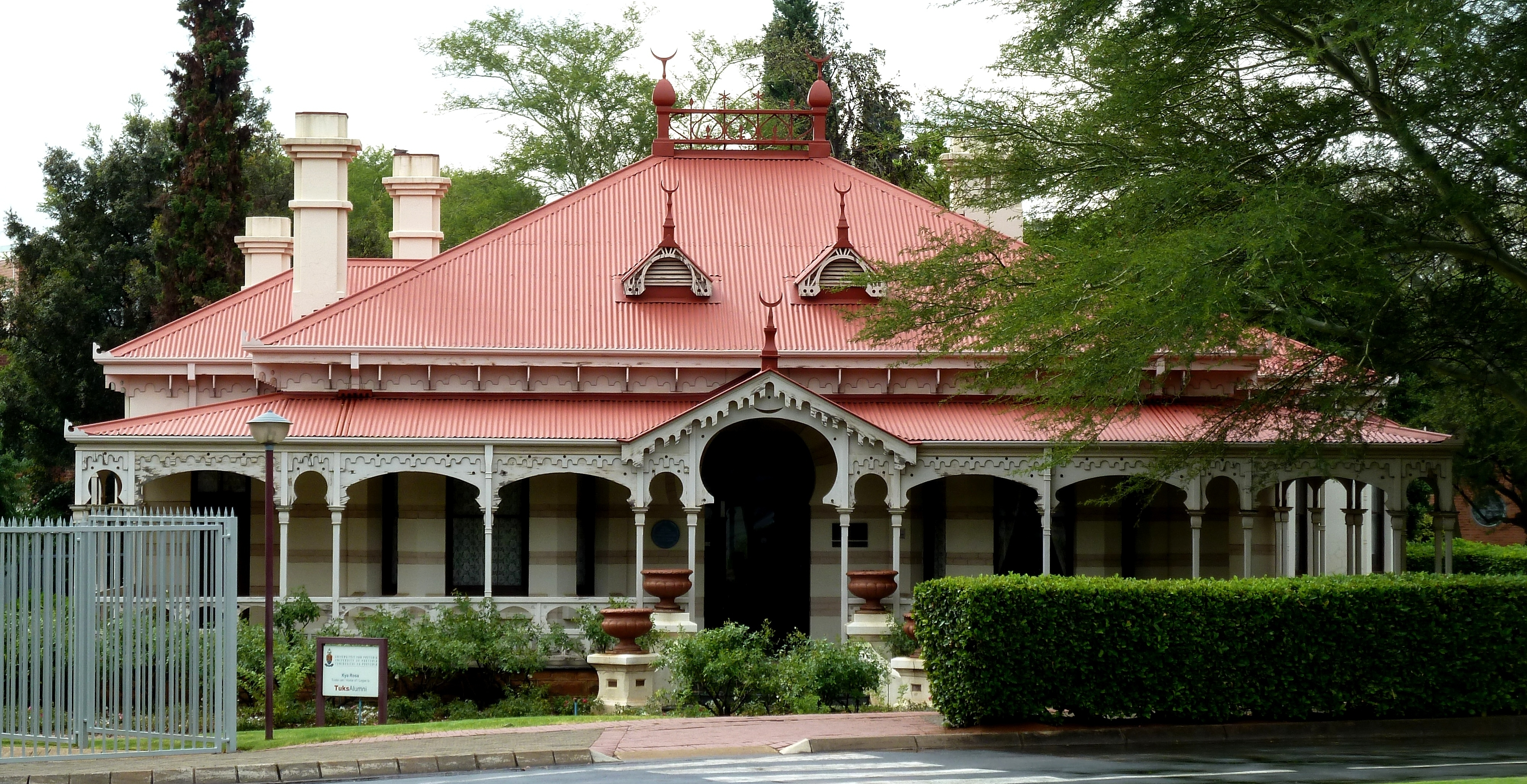
Kya Rosa, University of Pretoria

Kaya Rosa is a beautifully decorated late-Victorian house at the main entrance to the University of Pretoria in Pretoria, South Africa.

The original building was constructed in Skinner Street in 1895 and belonged to Leo Weinthal, owner of The Press. It was named after his wife, Rosa. The word ‘Kaya’ is the Zulu word for ‘house’.

Kaya Rosa later became the first home of the then Transvaal University College (TUC) – the predecessor of the University of Pretoria – but by 1911 construction of the Old Arts Building (University of Pretoria) had been completed following which Kaya Rosa was home to the first female student residence of the university until 1915, whereafter it was no longer in use. In 1980, the university commissioned the construction of a replica of the house where it stands today – at the Roper Street entrance to the university. Work began in 1983, under the guidance of architect Albrecht Holm, an alumnus of the University of Pretoria who is well known for his restouration work including that of the Ou Raadsaal as well as the Palace of Justice, Pretoria on Church square, Pretoria (Kerkplein, Pretoria) in the city centre.

Precise measurements were taken from the original building and old photographs were used as reference to ensure that the reconstructed building closely resembles the original house. Many of the original Victorian fittings were used in the reconstruction. Today, Kaya Rosa houses part of the Department of Enrolment and Student Administration of the university. The reconstructed replica of the house was officially opened by Dr Anton Rupert on 25 October 1985.
