= Old Arts Building (University of Pretoria) =

- Interactive map of the Old Arts Building area

General information
- Coordinates: 25.75417°S 28.23028°E

The Old Arts Building, on the main campus of the University of Pretoria, was one of the first structures built there. The building is located on the eastern side of an open courtyard facing the University of Pretoria Faculty of Engineering, the Built Environment, and Information Technology on the western side of same. The official city architect working for the Department of Public Works drew up the plans for the building. On August 3, 1910, Governor General of South Africa Herbert Gladstone, 1st Viscount Gladstone laid the cornerstone for a structure designed by John Johnstone Kirkness, and in 1911, the university moved to its current location.

Local sandstone was used on the building, featuring a style reminiscent of French Renaissance architecture. A distinctive bell tower and stained-glass windows with the coat of arms of the Transvaal University College (T.U.K.) are among the elements here.

The building houses the Mapungubwe Collection in the northern wing of the upper floor, where 166,000 artifacts from the Kingdom of Mapungubwe Mapungubwe excavation are exhibited. In the southern wing of the upper floor lies the Van Tilburg Collection, focusing mainly on South African antiquities and featuring the largest collection of Asian ceramics in the Southern Hemisphere. A collection of bronze sculptures by Anton van Wouw were also scheduled for exhibition in the central tower section of the Building.
