= University of Pretoria Faculty of Engineering, the Built Environment and Information Technology =

Technical school in Pretoria, South Africa

- Former names: Transvaal University College (1908–1930)
- Type: Public
- Established: 1908
- Affiliations: University of Pretoria
- Dean: Sunil Maharaj
- Location: (South Africa) Pretoria, Gauteng, South Africa
- Campus: Hatfield
Colours
Blue, Gold and Red
- Nickname: Tuks or Tukkies
- Mascot: Oom Gert
- Website: up.ac.za/faculty-of-engineering-built-environment-it

The University of Pretoria Faculty of Engineering, the Built Environment and Information Technology (commonly referred to as EBIT) educational programs stretch back to 1908 and consists of the School of Engineering, School for the Built Environment, School of Information Technology and the Graduate School of Technology Management. The university is the only African collaborator in the CDIO engineering initiative: Since 1997, the university as a whole has produced more research outputs every year than any other institution of higher learning in South Africa, as measured by the Department of Education's accreditation benchmark.

== History ==
The proposal for a university for the capital, first mooted in the Volksraad in 1889, was interrupted by the outbreak of the Anglo Boer War in 1899. In 1902 after the signing of the Peace of Vereeniging, the Normal College for teacher training was established in Groenkloof, Pretoria and in 1904 the Transvaal Technical Institute, with emphasis on mining education, opened in Johannesburg. In 1906 the Transvaal Technical Institute changed its name to the Transvaal University College. On 4 March 1908 when the Transvaal University College (TUC) transferred its arts and science courses to its newly established Pretoria Campus the precursor to the university was established, initially offering courses in languages, sciences, and law. The Department of Architecture was officially established 1943.

== Academics ==
The School of Engineering offers the undergraduate and postgraduate programmes in chemical engineering, civil and biosystems engineering, electrical, electronic and computer engineering, industrial and systems engineering, materials science and metallurgical engineering, mechanical and aeronautical engineering, mining engineering and the postgraduate only engineering and technology management programmes.

The School for the Built Environment offers the undergraduate and postgraduate programmes in architecture, landscape architecture, interior Architecture, quantity surveying, construction management, and town and regional Planning.

The School of Information Technology offers the undergraduate and postgraduate programmes in the fields of computer science, informatics and information science.

The Graduate School of Technology Management offers the postgraduate programmes in the fields of technology, management, project management, engineering management, life cycle managementand asset management.

== Accreditation and affiliations ==
Engineering programmes are accredited by the Engineering Council of South Africa (ECSA) and recognised internationally through the Washington Accord in Australia, Canada, Chinese Taipei, Hong Kong, China, Ireland, Japan, Korea, Malaysia, New Zealand, Singapore, Turkey, the United Kingdom and the United States of America.

The CDIO Initiative (CDIO is an initialism for Conceive — Design — Implement — Operate) is an innovative educational framework for producing the next generation of engineers. The framework provides students with an education stressing engineering fundamentals set in the context of Conceiving — Designing — Implementing — Operating real-world systems and products. Throughout the world, CDIO Initiative collaborators have adopted CDIO as the framework of their curricular planning and outcome-based assessment.

CDIO was formally founded by Massachusetts Institute of Technology in the late 1990s. In 2000 it became an international collaboration, with universities around the world adopting the same framework. The collaborators maintain a dialogue about what works and what doesn't and continue to refine the project. Determining additional members of the collaboration is a selective process managed a Council comprising original members and early adopters.

== Student activities and community engagement ==
- The university organises the annual SAE International sanctioned student automotive engineering Baja SAE competition in South Africa sponsored by Sasol. All undergraduate student participate in a compulsory community based project module as part of the university's wider community engagement strategy. The module was a finalist for the 2010 MacJannet Prize for Global Citizenship.
- House EBIT provides a platform for social engagement, community outreach and student engagement with the faculty.

== Reputation and ranking ==
League table rankings

The QS World University Rankings ranks the faculty as follows:

| Year | Engineering & IT |
|---|---|
| 2010 | 351-400 |
| 2009 | 291 |
| 2008 | — |
| 2007 | 368 |

Recent awards won by architecture students include:

| Year | Award |
|---|---|
| 2011 | Africa and Middle East Region's Holcim Next Generation Award for post-graduate students |
| 2010 | Hunter Douglas Award at the Archiprix International |
| 2010 | Networked Digital Library of Theses and Dissertations award |
| 2010 | Murray & Roberts Des Baker competition |
| 2010 | DesignHub Respond-Renew-Revitalise Competition |
| 2010 | DesignHub Respond-Renew-Revitalise Competition - best Architecture department |

== Alumni ==
Well-known alumni include: Marius Kloppers former CEO of BHP, the world's largest mining company and named by CNN Money as the world's 18th most powerful person in business. Calie Pistorius is a South African academic who is currently the Vice-Chancellor of the University of Hull, United Kingdom. Stefan Swanepoel is a recognized global real estate expert and author of more than 50 books and reports, some which have been listed on the New York Times and Wall Street Journal bestseller lists.
