= Lavagnon Ika =

- Born: Benin
- Citizenship: Canadian and Beninese
- Occupations: Project management scientist, academic and author

Academic background
- Education: Institut National d'Économie; Université du Québec à Hull; Université du Québec à Montréal
- Thesis: The key success factors for international development projects (2011)

Lavagnon Ika is a Benin-born, Canadian project management scientist, academic, thought leader, and author. He is professor of Project Management, the founding director of the Major Projects Observatory, as well as the program director of the MSc in Management at the Telfer School of Management at the University of Ottawa, and an Extraordinary Professor at the University of Pretoria.

Ika is most known for his contribution to the academic and policy debate on why large-scale projects experience cost overruns and benefit shortfalls worldwide, and how to make them work and deliver more success in the short and long terms. He is also known for his research on project success and for his contributions to research on managing global development projects, those initiatives that seek to address the challenges of sustainable and equitable poverty reduction and improvement of living standards in the Global South. In particular, he has sought to strengthen project management theory and practice in Africa. His work focuses on project management, primarily on project management and strategy implementation, major infrastructure delivery, international development, grand challenges, project behavior, and project performance.

He twice received the Global Research Award from the International Project Management Association (IPMA). He is the coauthor of the 2024 Project Management Institute (PMI) award-winning book titled Managing Fuzzy Projects in 3D: A Proven, Multi-Faceted Blueprint for Overseeing Complex Projects. He is also editor of The Cambridge University Handbook of Project Behavior, a compendium of chapters by project scholars over why large-scale projects take complex out-turns during their complicated life and what can be done about it.

== Education ==
Ika completed a Bachelor of Business Administration in 1997 from the Institut National d'Économie in Benin. In 1998, he moved to Canada for his MSc in Project Management. He completed his Master of Science in Project Management from Université du Québec à Hull in 2001. He obtained his PhD in Business Administration in 2011 from Université du Québec à Montréal, through a joint doctoral program with McGill, Concordia, and HEC Montréal. His thesis focused on the critical success factors of World-Bank funded projects.

== Career ==
Ika began his academic career in 2001 as a part-time professor at Université du Québec, where he eventually became associate professor. Concurrently, he joined the Telfer School of Management at the University of Ottawa as assistant professor, turning associate professor in 2015 and reaching the rank of full professor of Project Management in 2019. In 2020, he became the founding Director of the Major Projects Observatory.

In 2020, Ika was appointed as a World Bank Fellow, but the fellowship was later suspended due to COVID-19. In 2022, Ika was named the program director of both the MSc in Management and Health Systems Programs at the University of Ottawa. Additionally, since 2023, he has been an Extraordinary Professor at the University of Pretoria.

Ika provided guidance for the World Bank as external advisory panel member on their Results and Performance of the World Bank Group 2023 and for the Project Management Institute (PMI) in 2024 as a lead scholar on how to measure project success.

== Research ==
Ika's project management research is divided into two main streams.

=== Cost overruns and benefit shortfalls ===
The first stream investigates the prevalence of cost overruns and benefit shortfalls in the West (e.g., Canada and USA), assessing whether biases (e.g., over-optimism) or errors (e.g., poor management) played a more significant role. The stream builds on the work of former Oxford Professor Bent Flyvbjerg, Daniel Kahneman, and Albert Hirschman. This research explores the practical implications of Daniel Kahneman's Planning fallacy versus Albert Hirschman's Hiding Hand principle, particularly during significant infrastructure investments for post-COVID-19 economic recovery. The Planning Fallacy, the tendency to over-promise and under-deliver, suggested that forecasts of costs and benefits are unrealistically close to best-case scenarios and that many projects should never have been started. The Hiding Hand proposed that if promoters had known the real costs and benefits of many projects, they would not have been done. He critiqued Bent Flyvbjerg's dismissal of Hirschman's Hiding Hand principle, arguing that Flyvbjerg's narrow focus on cost-benefit analysis overlooked broader project impacts and problem-solving aspects, and thus that ignorance may be good for projects. He presented evidence that the Hiding Hand was more prevalent in project successes than Flyvbjerg acknowledged. Furthermore, he also demonstrated that 60% of projects are prone to optimism bias.

Furthermore, Ika examined the causes of cost overruns in transport construction projects by analyzing contextual factors such as program management, quality, safety, design, and management practices, recommending alternative procurement strategies to address these issues. He also explored the multidimensional nature of project success, addressing business case benefits delivery, diverse stakeholder perceptions, sustainability concerns, and proposed a four-dimensional model to assess and understand project outcomes over time.

Ika's first stream of research culminated with a new theory of project behavior and performance, coined "The Fifth Hand", which asserted that biases and errors combined to exact a heavy toll on projects. Following the work of Gerd Gigerenzer, the longtime director of the Max Planck Institute for Human Development and critic of Daniel Kahneman, he argued that the Planning Fallacy, along with its remedy "bias uplifts" such as Reference Class Forecasting (RCF), might work under risk, not uncertainty, where probability calculus falls short. He recommended instead, the use of heuristics and "best fit" practices. Such heuristics or rules of thumb included "Your biggest risk and asset is you" and "Plan your work and work your plan, but be ready for a few surprises down the road". He also argued that the Cassandras or the over-pessimistic and the Pollyannas or the over-optimistic promoters of projects were both right and wrong and called on promoters to be Januses, who are much more pragmatic characters in the world of projects. Ika's work (in collaboration with Peter Love and Jeffrey Pinto) on these challenges has led to IPMA's 2022 Research Award.

=== Global project management ===
In his second research stream, Ika explored the factors contributing to the success and failure of global development projects, with a particular focus on Africa. He suggested that projects in Africa often fall into four traps: the one-size-fits-all technical trap, the accountability-for-results trap, the lack-of-project-management-capacity trap, and the cultural trap. He investigated the importance of contextual understanding, the pitfalls of results-based management (RBM), and the complexities of scaling up and replicating successful projects across different locations to enhance the positive impact on beneficiaries, especially the poor and marginalized. Focusing on the theory of capacity building project delivery, his 2017 research examined structural, institutional, and managerial conditions for the success of international development projects in different contexts, proposing that high levels of multi-stakeholder commitment, collaboration, alignment, and adaptation were crucial. In related research, his 2022 study analyzed the evolution of the concept of "capacity building" through a literature review, suggesting a "new pragmatism" framework that emphasized context sensitivity, methodological pluralism, and collaborative knowledge creation for more effective public administration practices.

Looking into World-Bank funded projects, Ika also showed that 60% of them are prone to optimism bias, which affects up to 20% of their performance. His investigation of how beneficiary engagement levels influenced short and long-term success in global development projects found that both beneficiary involvement and participation positively influenced project outcomes. It also emphasized the importance of tailored approaches and factors like beneficiary trust in project governance for maximizing impact, especially in low- and middle-income countries, notably in Africa. Additionally, this second stream led to a "project management school" in global development, which explored how project activities and processes are really carried out.

Ika coined the term grand challenge projects, which represented projects that sought to tackle grand challenges or those complex problems the world faced (e.g., climate change, global pandemics, and unsustainable development). He suggested that grand challenges and project management were strange bedfellows, but a more adaptive, agile, collaborative, and best-fit project management approach, where strategic logic, heuristics, intuition, and agile experimentation prevailed, could work, considering the fuzziness that often characterized grand challenges. He further added that a portfolio, program, network, or national development plan approach was the best shot at tackling grand challenges sustainably.

Ika's work in this stream has led to international recognition including fellowships visiting professor postings in many African universities and a title of Extraordinary Professor at the University of Pretoria.

== Awards and honors ==
- 2017 – Global Research Award, International Project Management Association
- 2017 – The Emerald Outstanding Project Management Paper Award
- 2021 – Fellow, World Bank
- 2021 – Telfer's Established Researcher Award, Telfer School of Management
- 2022 – Global Research Award, International Project Management Association
- 2022 – Carnegie African Diaspora Fellow
- 2024 – PMI David I. Cleland Project Management Literature Award

== Bibliography ==
=== Books ===
- Managing fuzzy projects in 3D: A proven, multi-faceted blueprint for overseeing complex projects (2023) ISBN 9781264278343

=== Selected articles ===
- Ika, L. A. (2009). Project success as a topic in project management journals. Project management journal, 40(4), 6–19.
- Ika, L. A., Diallo, A., & Thuillier, D. (2010). Project management in the international development industry: the project coordinator's perspective. International Journal of Managing Projects in Business, 3(1), 61–93.
- Ika, L. A., Diallo, A., & Thuillier, D. (2012). Critical success factors for World Bank projects: An empirical investigation. International journal of project management, 30(1), 105–116.
- Ika, L. A. (2012). Project management for development in Africa: Why projects are failing and what can be done about it. Project management journal, 43(4), 27–41.
- Ika, L. A., & Donnelly, J. (2017). Success conditions for international development capacity building projects. International Journal of Project Management, 35(1), 44–63.
- Ika, L. A. (2018). Beneficial or detrimental ignorance: The straw man fallacy of Flyvbjerg's test of Hirschman's hiding hand. World Development, 103, 369–382.
- Love, P. E., Sing, M. C., Ika, L. A., & Newton, S. (2019). The cost performance of transportation projects: The fallacy of the Planning Fallacy account. Transportation Research Part A: Policy and Practice, 122, 1–20.
- Ika, L. A., Love, P. E., & Pinto, J. K. (2020). Moving beyond the planning fallacy: The emergence of a new principle of project behavior. IEEE Transactions on Engineering Management, 69(6), 3310–3325.
- Love, P. E., Ika, L. A., & Sing, M. C. (2022). Does the planning fallacy prevail in social infrastructure projects? Empirical evidence and competing explanations. IEEE transactions on Engineering Management, 69(6), 2588–2602.
- Ika, L., Pinto, J. K., Love, P. E., & Pache, G. (2023). Bias versus error: why projects fall short. Journal of Business Strategy, 44(2), 67–75.
- Love, P. E., Ika, L. A., & Pinto, J. K. (2023). Smart heuristics for decision-making in the ‘wild’: Navigating cost uncertainty in the construction of large-scale transport projects. Production Planning & Control, 1–18.
