= Van Gybland-Oosterhoff Collection =

The Van Gybland-Oosterhoff collection of the University of Pretoria in South Africa, collected by and donated by Louise Jeanette van Gybland Oosterhoff (1885–1973) in honor of her brother Dr Horace Hugo Alexander van Gybland Oosterhoff (1887–1937). It was accepted by the university on 22 June 1937 and is the largest collection of objects, publications, memorabilia and photographs of historical interest, relating to Dutch culture outside of the Netherlands.

== Engravings ==
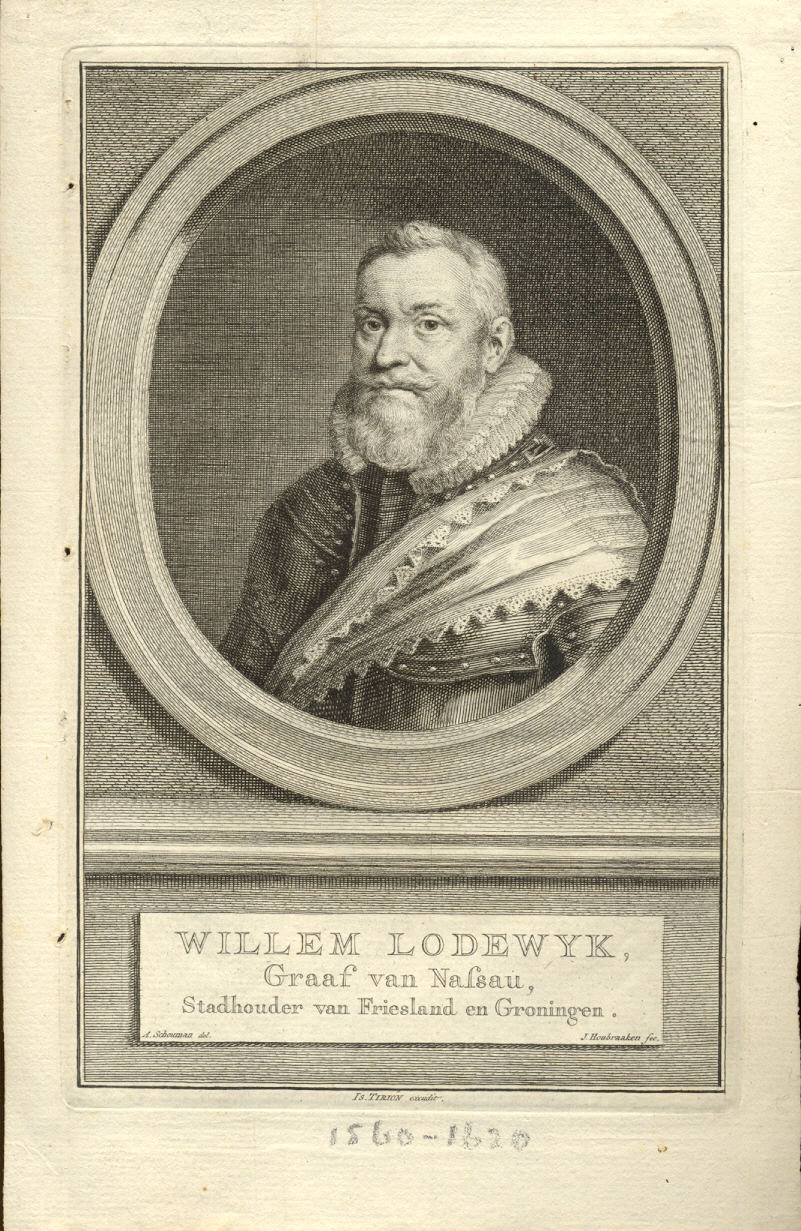
Willem Lodewijk, etching done by Jacobus Houbraken, published by Isaac Tirion, 1752

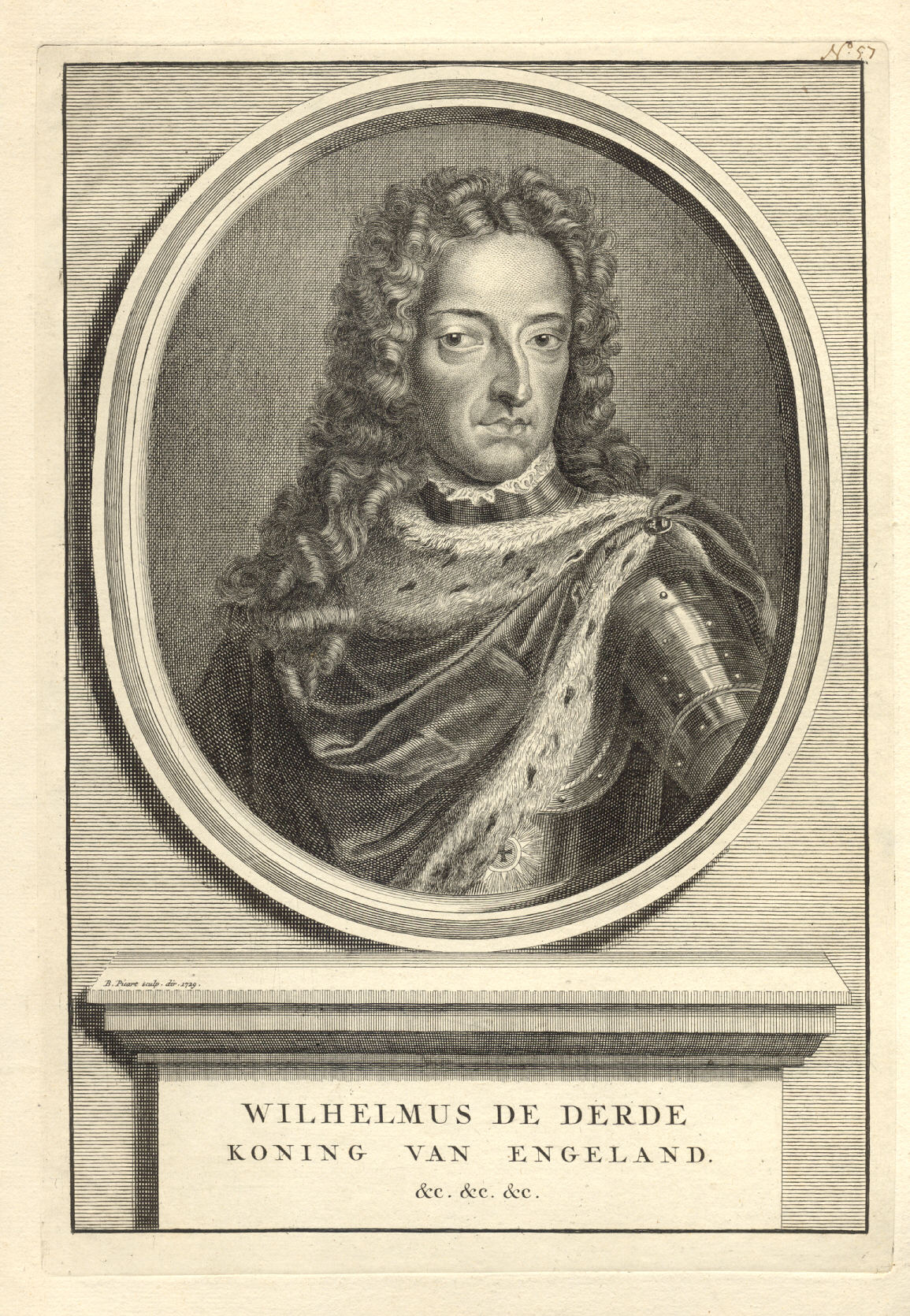
Engraving of an oval portrait of William III of England, Inscribed "Wilhelmus de Derde koning van Engeland " signed "B Picart sculp dir 1729

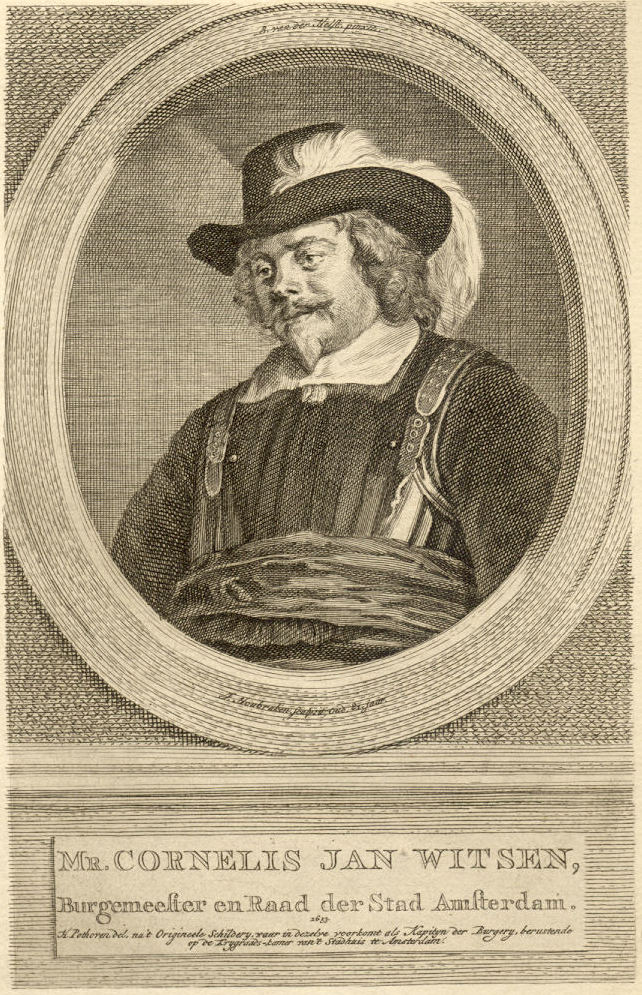
Cornelis Jan Witsen, engraved by Jacobus Houbraken (1698-1780)

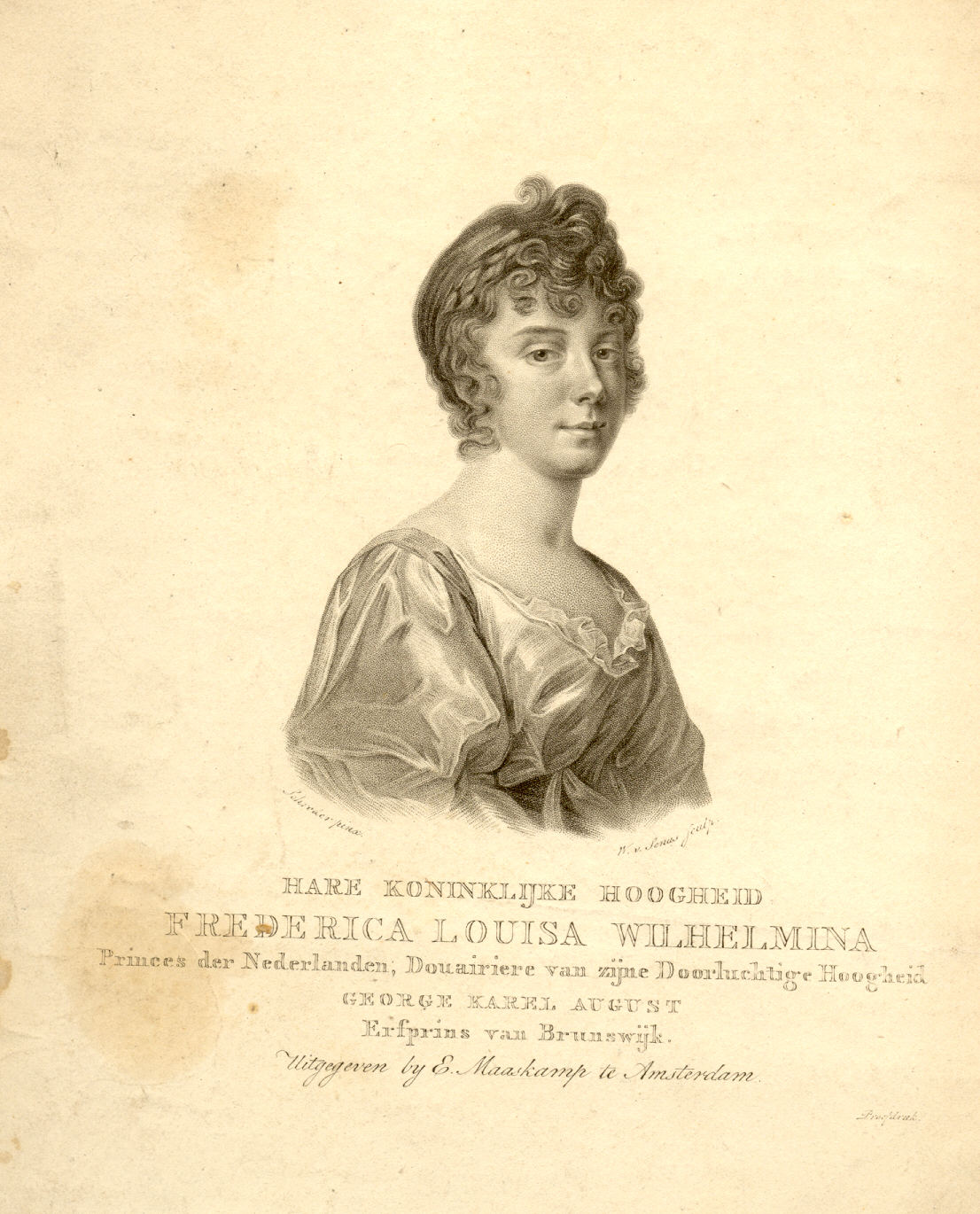
Wilhelmina of Prussia by Willem van Senus. Published by E Maaskamp in 1816

== See also ==
- Mapungubwe Museum
- Van Wouw Museum
