= Old School of Mines, Kimberley =

Historic building in South Africa

The Old School of Mines building in Hull Street, Kimberley, is where the South African School of Mines was established in 1896, later evolving into the Transvaal University College, and eventually into both the University of the Witwatersrand and the University of Pretoria. In 1904 the school was moved to Johannesburg, becoming the Transvaal Technical Institute which, in turn, was renamed the Transvaal University College in 1906. The separation of Johannesburg and Pretoria campuses in 1910 paved the way for establishment of the Universities of the Witwatersrand (1922) and of Pretoria (1930).

== Heritage, theatre and tourism ==
Kimberley's Old School of Mines building was declared as a national monument (now a provincial heritage site) in 1977 on account of its association with the development of the mining industry, having been erected to house the first technical training school for the mining industry in South Africa. Of architectural interest as well, it is an example of late Victorian style.

In the 1980s-90s the Kimberley Repertory Players converted the building for use as the Hull Street Theatre.

The building was being promoted as a tourist attraction by the Sol Plaatje Local Municipality in Kimberley's tourism website, Kimberley: the city that sparkles. But heritage conservation issues mark its most recent history in a context of neglect and with construction work on an adjoining property encroaching towards and partially obscuring the building.
