= University of Pretoria =

Public university in South Africa

- Universiteit van Pretoria; Yunibesithi ya Pretoria
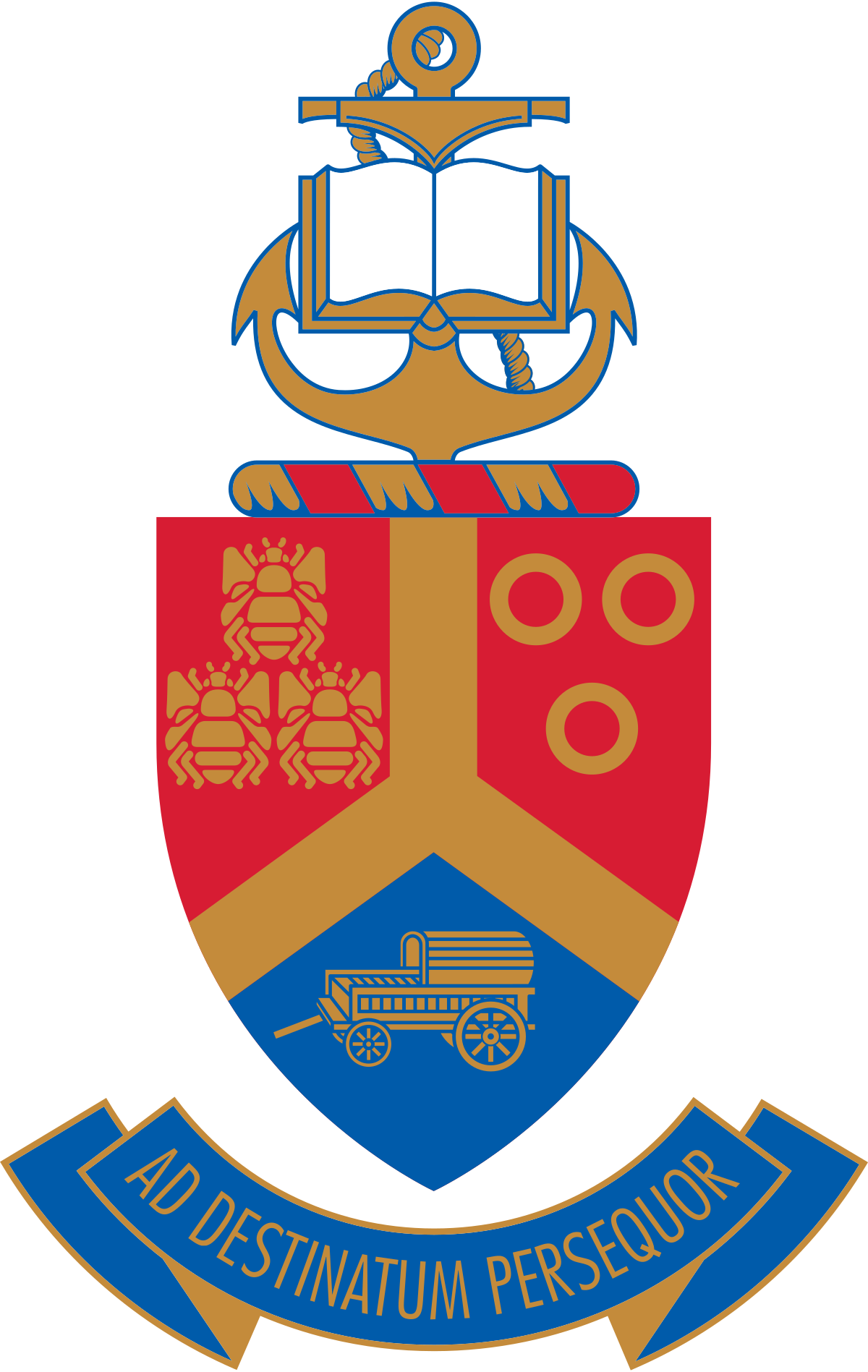
- Other name: Tuks or Tukkies
- Former name: Transvaal University College (1908–1930)
- Motto: Ad destinatum persequor (Latin)
- Motto in English: "With zeal and perseverance, strive towards the goal"
- Type: Public research university
- Established: 4 March 1908; 118 years ago
- Affiliations: AAU; ACU; FOTIM; HESA; IEASA
- Endowment: R 7.4 billion (2022)
- Chancellor: Sisi Khampepe
- Vice-Chancellor: Francis Petersen
- Chairperson of Council: Kuseni Dlamini
- Administrative staff: 13,814 (full-time)
- Students: 56,409 (total); 53,131 (contact); 3,278 (distance)
- Undergraduates: 35,942
- Postgraduates: 12,541
- Location: Pretoria, Gauteng, South Africa
- Campus: 1,120 hectares (2,800 acres); 7 suburban campuses and facilities
- Colours: Blue, gold, and red
- Website: www.up.ac.za

The University of Pretoria (Afrikaans: Universiteit van Pretoria; Northern Sotho: Yunibesithi ya Pretoria) is a multi-campus public research university in Pretoria, the administrative and de facto capital of South Africa. The university was established in 1908 as the Pretoria campus of the Johannesburg-based Transvaal University College and is the fourth South African institution in continuous operation to be awarded university status. The university has grown from the original 32 students in a single late Victorian house to approximately 53,000 in 2019. The university was built on seven suburban campuses on 1,190 hectares (2,900 acres).

The university is organised into nine faculties and a business school. Established in 1920, the University of Pretoria Faculty of Veterinary Science is the second oldest veterinary school in Africa and the only veterinary school in South Africa. In 1949, the university launched the first MBA programme outside North America, and the university's Gordon Institute of Business Science (GIBS) has consistently been ranked the top business school in Africa for executive education, as well as being placed in the top 50 in the world. In 2012, the Financial Times ranked the GIBS Executive MBA 1st in Africa and 60th in the world.

The university is commonly referred to as UP, Tuks, or Tukkies and in post-nominals the university is typically abbreviated as Pret or UP, although Pretoria is also used in official publications.

== History ==
=== Foundational years: 1889–1929 ===
The day might come when the Transvaal University College might mean to the Transvaal what Oxford University has meant to England. A long time might have to pass, and for a hundred years we might have to watch the grass growing on our lawns before that day arrives, but noble beginning has been made.

— Jan Smuts,
at the laying of the Old Arts building's foundation stone

The Old Arts Building in 1910, now a provincial heritage site

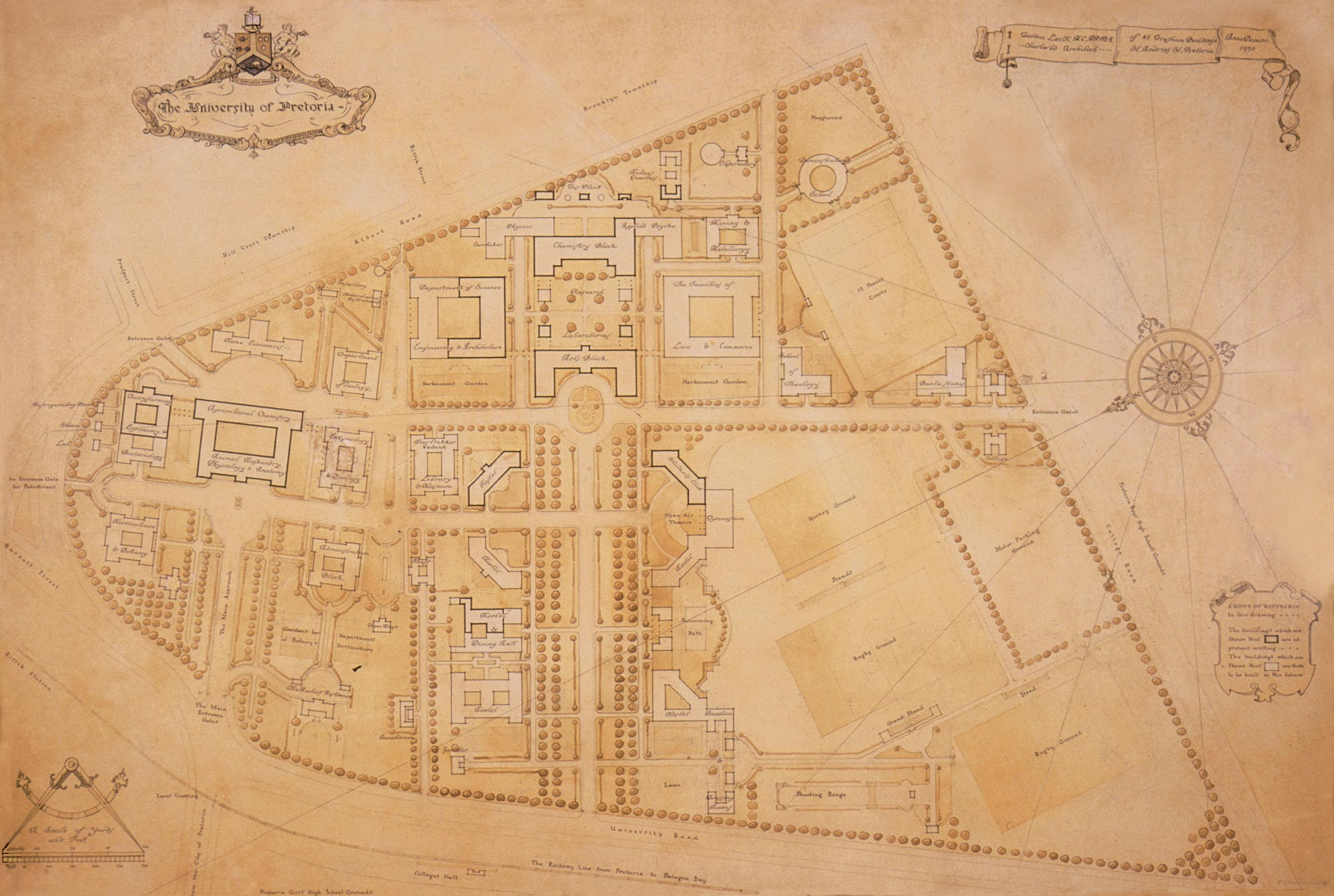
University of Pretoria Main Campus master plan in 1930

The proposal for a university for the capital, first mooted in the Volksraad in 1889, was interrupted by the outbreak of the Anglo–Boer War in 1899. In 1896, the South African School of Mines was founded in Kimberley. Eight years later, in 1904, the school was moved to Johannesburg and was renamed the Transvaal Technical Institute. The school's name changed yet again in 1906 to Transvaal University College. In 1902, after the signing of the Peace of Vereeniging, the Normal College for teacher training was established in Groenkloof, Pretoria. On 4 March 1908, when the Transvaal University College (TUC) transferred its arts and science courses to its newly established Pretoria campus, the precursor to the university was established, initially offering courses in languages, sciences, and law.

Instruction commenced with 32 students, 4 professors and 3 lecturers in the Kya Rosa, 270 Skinner Street a late Victorian residence purchased from Leo Weinthal the then owner of The Press (forerunner to the Pretoria News newspaper). The first four professors were H. Th. Reinink (Dutch), J. Purves (Scottish), D.F. du Toit Malherbe (South African) and A.C. Paterson (Scottish), who would also become the first vice-chancellor.

In 1910, the colonial secretary, General Jan Smuts tabled the act constituting the university as a separate entity before the Transvaal Parliament, the "Transvaalse and Universiteits-Inlijvingswet" Law 1 of 1910. On 17 May 1910, the Johannesburg and Pretoria campuses separated, each becoming an independent institution. The Johannesburg campus being reincorporated as the South African School of Mines and Technology, while the Pretoria campus retained the name of Transvaal University College until 1930. The South African School of Mines and Technology would later go on to become the University of the Witwatersrand in 1922. In 1910, the TUC acquired its own campus in the east of Pretoria, what is now the western part of the university's main campus in Hatfield. On 3 August 1910, Governor-General Herbert John Gladstone, 1st Viscount Gladstone laid the cornerstone of the Old Arts Building, the first building to be built on the newly established Hatfield campus. The building's striking Cape Dutch and Neo-Romanesque architectural style was recognised in 1968 when it was declared a provincial heritage site. During this time the colloquial name for the university, Tukkies or Tuks, was derived from the Afrikaans acronym for the college, i.e. Transvaalse Universiteitskollege (TUK).

The late 1910s and early 1920s saw the establishment of several faculties as the academic activities were expanded. Courses in agriculture (1917), theology (1918), economics and political science (1919), veterinary science (1920), and music (1923) were established as the institution grew.

=== Establishment and expansion years 1929–1982 ===
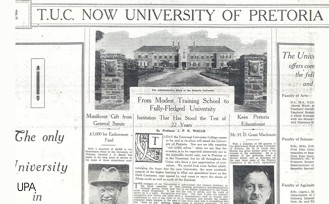
A newspaper article celebrating the name change

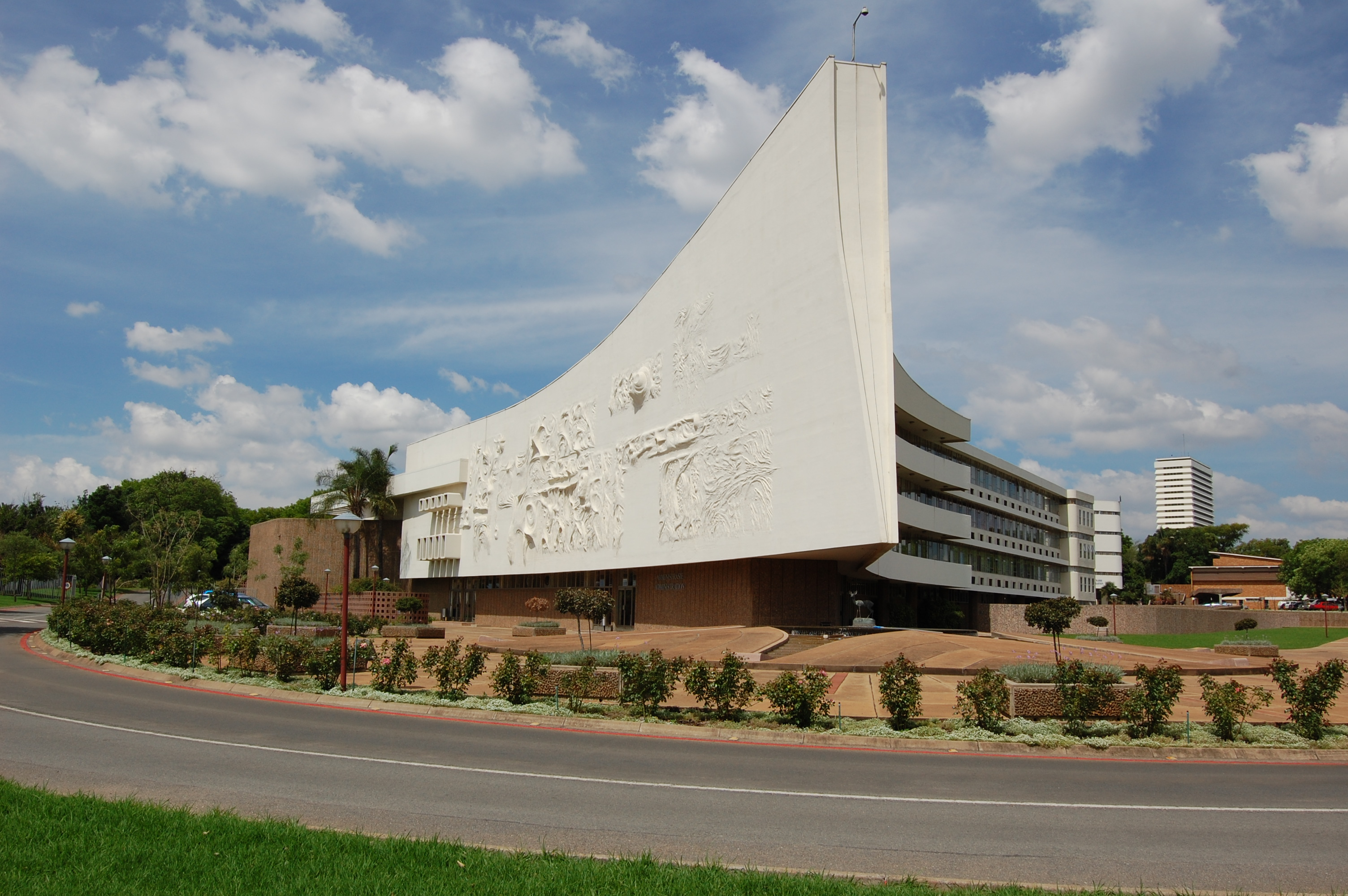
The Administration Building (nicknamed "The Ship") at the corner of Lynnwood and University Roads in Hatfield, Pretoria

On 10 October 1930, the University of Pretoria Private Act, No. 13 of 1930 changed the name of the TUC to the University of Pretoria. The TUC originally established as an English-medium institution had evolved into the only fully bilingual university in South Africa and remained as such until the early 1930s. The rapid increase of Afrikaans-speaking students brought about an imbalance between the demographics of students and the languages of instruction. By 1931, although 65% of students were Afrikaans-speaking, 68% of the classes were conducted in English. In 1932, the University Council addressed the imbalance, deciding that Afrikaans would become the only medium of instruction. An increase in student numbers necessitated the building of new facilities such as the Club Hall and Administration Building (colloquially known as the ship) when the seventh faculty, the Medical Faculty, was established in 1943. This period further saw the establishment of numerous student activities such as the annual Spring Day event and intervarsity. Student publications established include the Trek in 1931, the first Rag Mag in 1936 and the weekly student newspaper Die Perdeby in 1939. The period of 1948–1982 is characterised by the substantial increase in numbers of an almost exclusively white student body and the concomitant physical growth of the university infrastructure. The nearly doubling of student numbers demanded the physical expansion of the Hatfield campus and new buildings were built in quick succession as the campus grew eastward. In the mid-1960s, the university urgently required additional land and acquired the adjacent property of Christian Brothers' College, Saint Gabriel's. This property now forms the eastern section of the Hatfield campus.

In 1949, the university founded the Graduate School of Management (GSM),

=== Transformation years: 1982 and beyond ===
University of Pretoria Faculty of Law building

During the period of 1982 to 2008, the university transformed into a bilingual, multiracial and inclusive institution. The comparatively smooth introduction of students from all races formed the initial impetus for transformation and in 1989 the university was declared officially desegregated and opened for all races. In 1993, a policy document was introduced, aiming to position the university in a newly democratic South Africa. In 1994, the university regained its status as a bilingual university when a new language policy was adopted. However, in 2019 a new language policy was adopted which discontinued Afrikaans as a language of instruction in favour of English only.

In 1999, the only two veterinary science faculties in the country, those of the University of Pretoria and Sefako Makgatho Health Sciences University, formerly Medunsa, were amalgamated. The university's Onderstepoort campus once again housed the only veterinary faculty in South Africa. In 2000, the Teachers Training College Pretoria, formerly the Normal College Pretoria founded in 1902, was incorporated into the university's Faculty of Education, which saw the faculty moving to the self-sufficient Groenkloof campus.

The university's business school in Illovo, Johannesburg, the Gordon Institute of Business Science (GIBS), was established in January 2000 following a substantial contribution by Sir Donald Gordon, the founder of Liberty Life and Liberty International, and a major investment by the University of Pretoria following discussions which started in 1998. The now defunct Vista University's Mamelodi campus was incorporated on 2 January 2004, as part of the restructuring of South African tertiary institutions. In 2011, GIBS opened a satellite campus on Pritchard Street in the inner city of Johannesburg. The Business school follows on the university's, now defunct Graduate School of Management's, long tradition of MBA tuition as the first business school outside North America and replaced it in January 2008.

== Administration and organisation ==
=== Governance ===
Faculty founding
Faculty	Year founded
Faculty of Economic and Management Sciences	1920
Faculty of Education	1902
Engineering, Built Environment and Information Technology	1908
Faculty of Health Sciences	1943
Faculty of Humanities	1908
Faculty of Law	1908
Faculty of Natural and Agricultural Sciences	1917
Faculty of Theology	1919
Faculty of Veterinary Science	1920

As set out in the Higher Education Act No 101 of 1997, the university is governed by the council with the vice-chancellor and principal, Professor Francis Petersen, the executive head responsible for the day-to-day administration, and the chancellor, Justice Sisi Khampempe, being the non-resident titular head of the university. The registrar is responsible for the academic administration of the university, as well as legal matters, and is secretary to the University Council and Senate.

The university's academic activities are divided into nine faculties and one business school. Whilst the faculties comprise 140 departments and 85 institutes, bureaus and centres.

== Main campus ==
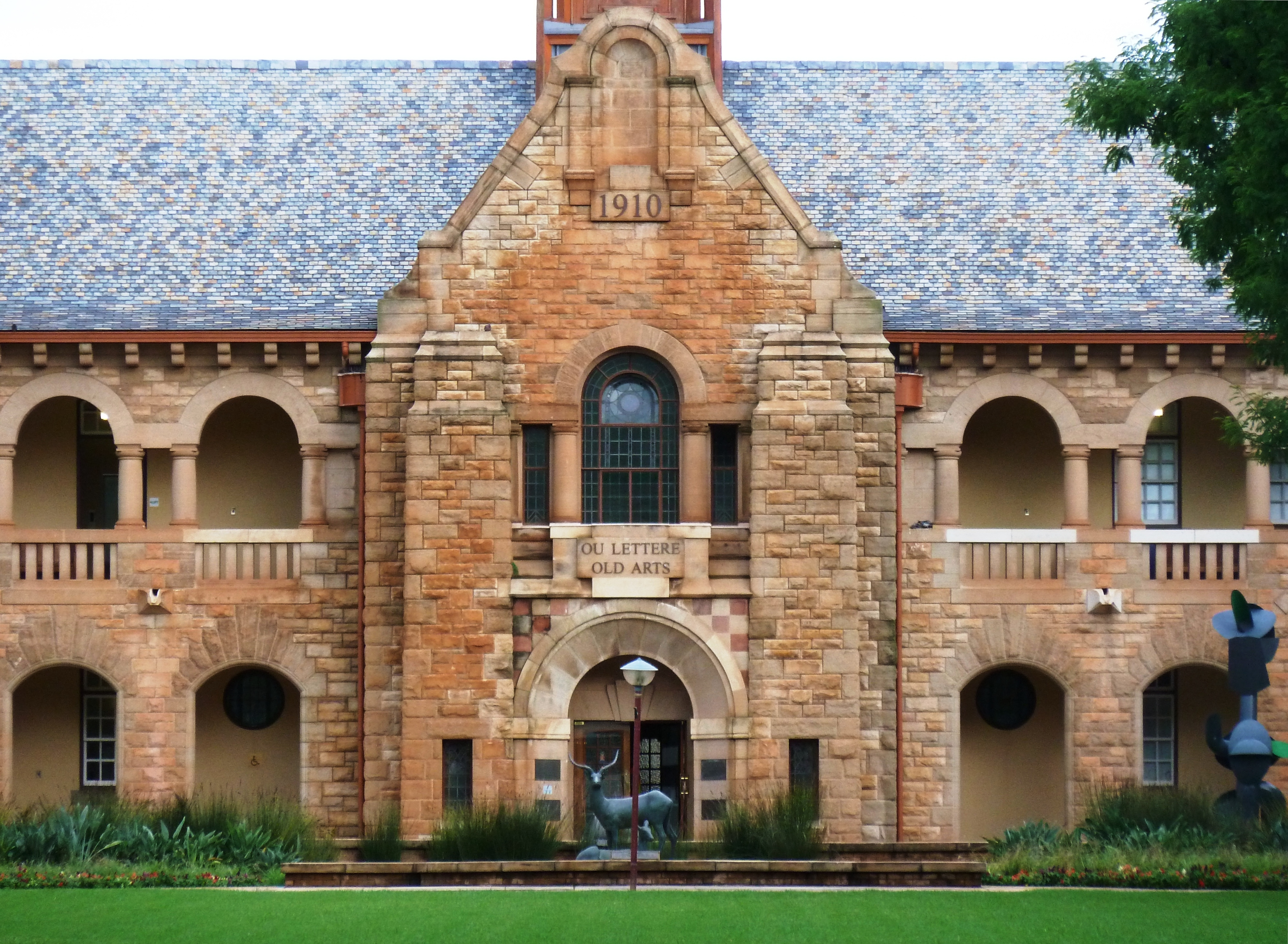
The Old Arts building now contains several museums

=== Hatfield ===
The university's main campus and central administration offices are situated in the suburb of Hatfield, Pretoria and houses six of the nine faculties. The campus, bordered by the suburb of Brooklyn to the south and Hatfield to the north, was built over 24 hectares (59 acres) and has more than 60 buildings of historical value.

Adjacent to the Hatfield campus is the Hillcrest campus, which contains the High Performance Centre and LC de Villiers Sports Grounds, which were developed on 76 hectares (190 acres). Adjacent to the sport grounds is the university's experimental farm, which is used to conduct field experiments for the Faculty of Natural and Agricultural Sciences. The campus is served by the Hatfield Gautrain station connecting Pretoria and Johannesburg. A university bus shuttle service operates between the Hatfield campus and the Groenkloof and Prinshof campuses, whilst a park-and-ride shuttle service operates between the Hatfield and Hillcrest campus.

==== Museums ====
The university's art collection consists primarily of paintings, sculptures and graphic works by South African artists including the likes of Jacobus Hendrik Pierneef, Gregoire Boonzaier, William Kentridge and Sam Nhlengethwa. The collection also incorporates artworks by renowned international artists such as Max Pechstein, Käthe Kollwitz, Max Liebermann, George Grosz, Otto Mueller, Thomas Benton and Marc Chagall. The university's sculpture collection, the largest such collection in South Africa, contains sculptures by Sidney Kumalo, Maureen Quinn, Michael Teffo, Anton Smit, Anton van Wouw, Edoardo Villa and others.

The Old Arts Building was proclaimed a provincial heritage site in 1968 and houses the Van Tilburg Collection, Van Gybland-Oosterhoff Collection and Mapungubwe Collection.

What survives are the almost untouched remains of the palace sites and also the entire settlement area dependent upon them, as well as two earlier capital sites, the whole presenting an unrivalled picture of the development of social and political structures over some 400 years.

— UNESCO,
on the Mapungubwe World Heritage Site

The university is the custodian of the collection of artefacts found at the Mapungubwe National Park and World Heritage Site and such display these artefacts in the Javett Art Centre. Gold ornaments, ivory, bone, ceramic-ware, clay figurines, trade beads, iron and copper artefacts are on permanent public display. The Van Gybland-Oosterhoff Collection is a ceramic collection, donated by Dr Horace Hugo Alexander van Gybland Oosterhoff and accepted by the university on 14 March 1939, is the largest collection of objects, publications, memorabilia and photographs of historical interest, relating to Dutch culture outside the Netherlands.

The Old Merensky Library houses the Edoardo Villa Museum, the home of the largest collection of sculptures by the Italian artist Edoardo Villa and one South Africa's most renowned sculptors, as well as sculptures by Anton van Wouw and the largest work by the artist Alexis Preller (3m x 13m) titled The Discovery.

Other art collections include the Christo Coetzee collection which was bequeathed to the university by the artist in 2001 and consists of more than 3000 objects, NKP Ceramics Collection, Hilgard Muller Collection, Mike Edwards Collection, Kruger Collection, Frans Esterhuizen Cartoon Collection, Baldinelli Trust Collection and Mimi Coertse Collection.

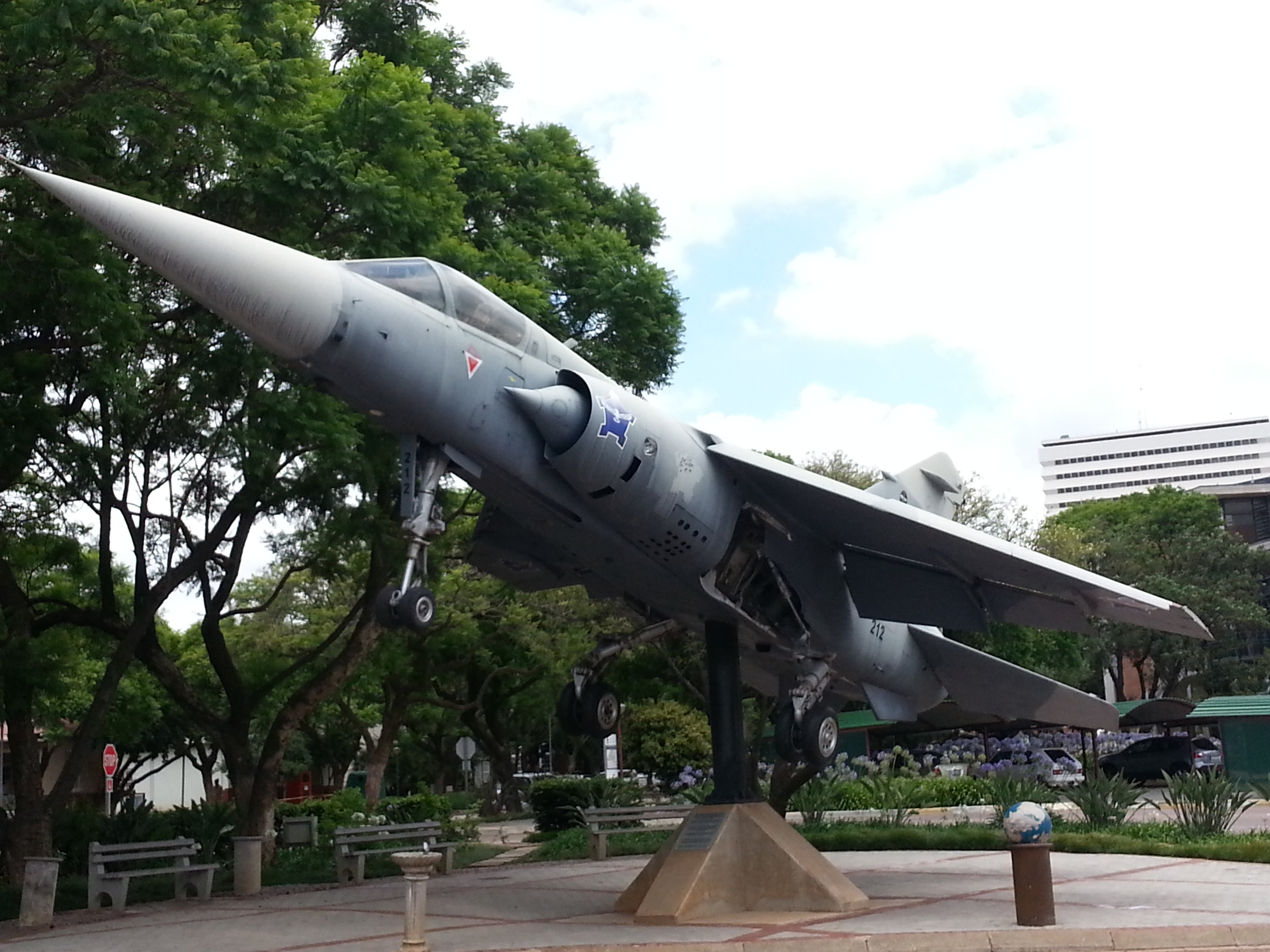
A retired SAAF Mirage F1CZ donated to the university and assembled with the help of the South African Air Force Museum from AFB Swartkop, the Air Force Servicing Unit at the Waterkloof Air Force Base, Mirage specialists from Aerosud, Lona Construction and Intermine Agencies. The Mirage F1 was assembled in order to promote science and technology at the University of Pretoria.

The university's Science, Engineering and Technology (SET) Discovery Centre, Sci-Enza, was officially launched in 1977. The Discovery Centre is an umbrella complex where young children, students and adults can explore the world of science, engineering and technology in a "play-as-you-learn" way. Activities at the Centre museum include: a digital planetarium; exploratorium; camera obscura; biological science exhibit; botanical garden and indigenous technology exhibit.

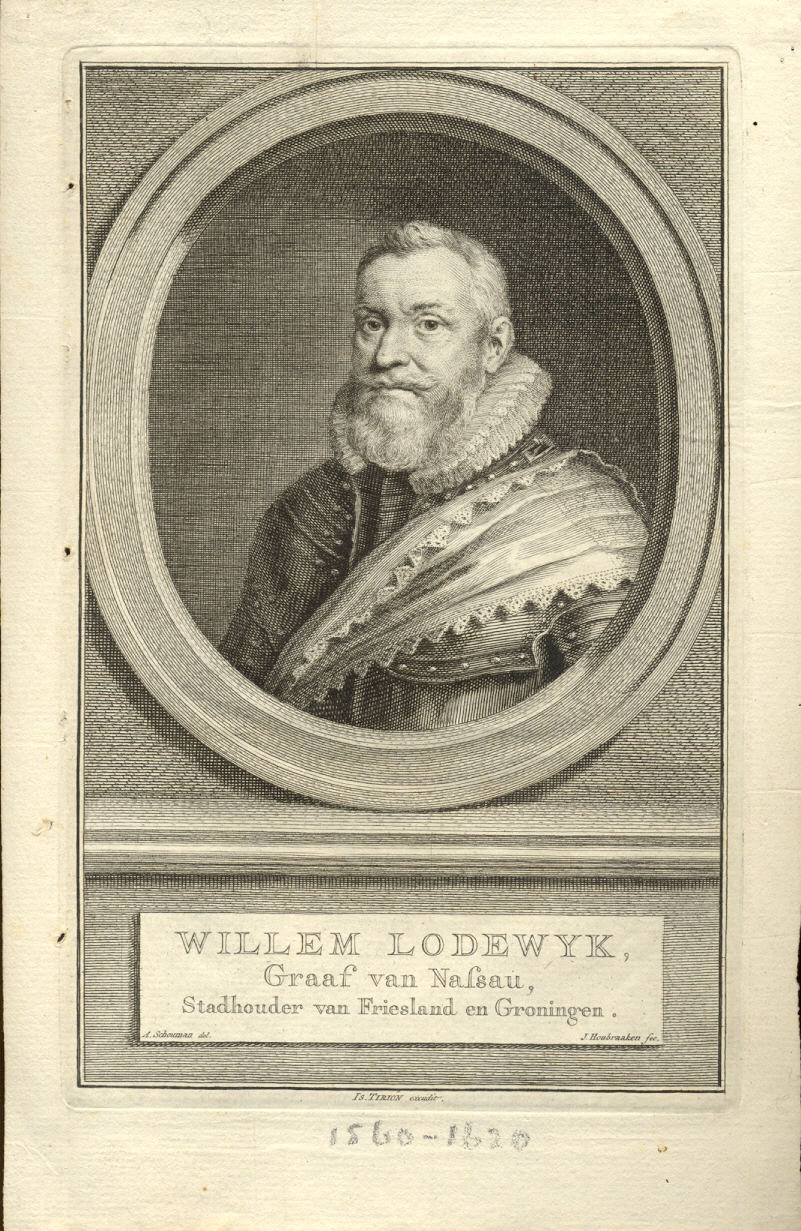
Willem Lodewijk, etching done by Jacobus Houbraken, published by Isaac Tirion, 1752. Forming part of the van Gybland-Oosterhoff Collection

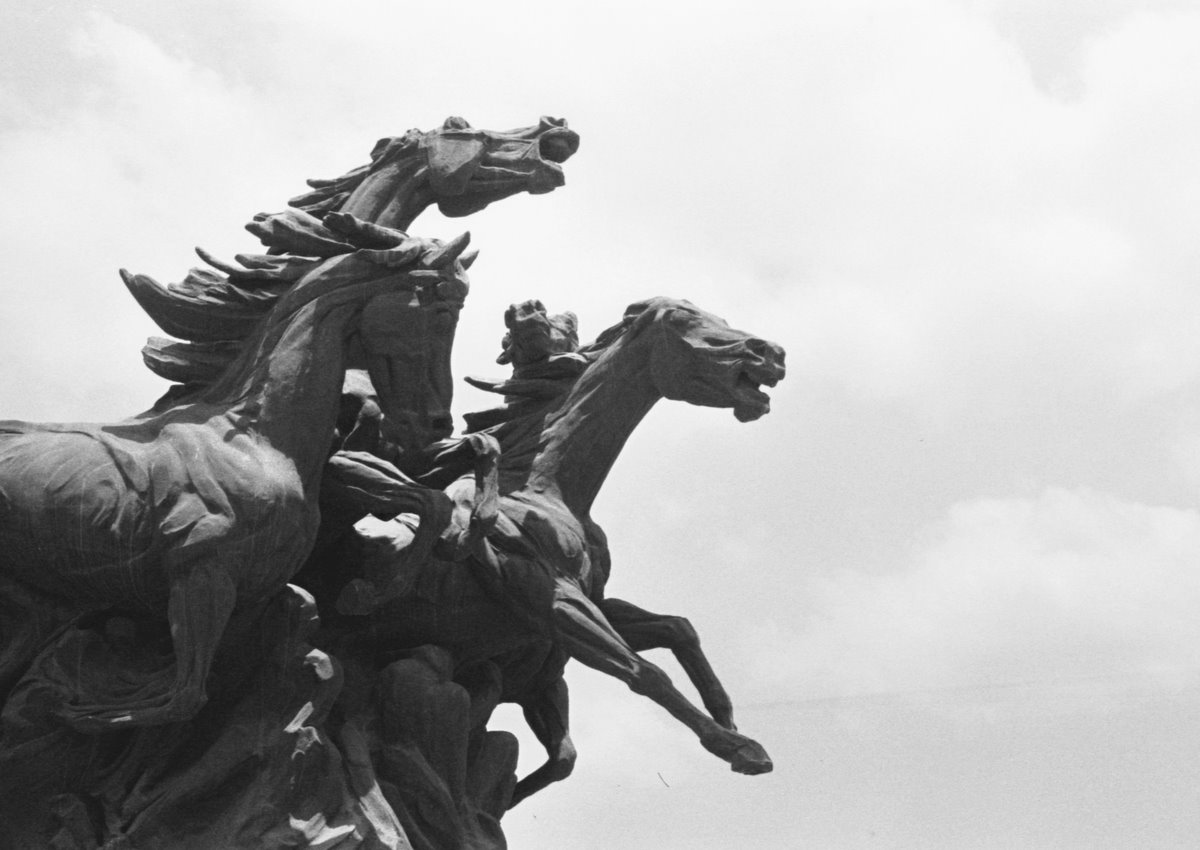
Equine sculpture by Danie de Jager, Lc de Villiers Sports grounds

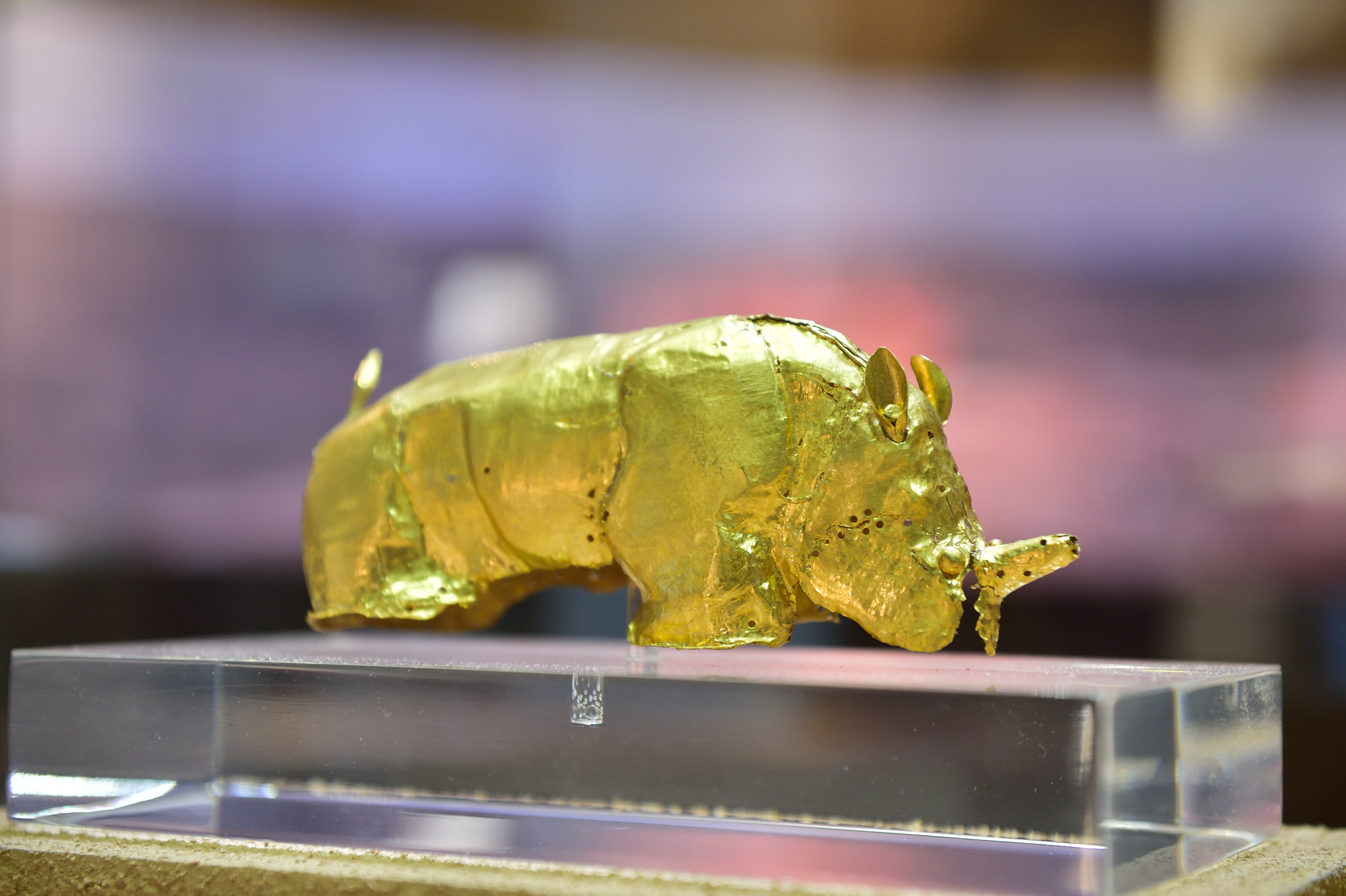
The gold rhino statuete in the Mapungubwe Museum

==== Key places ====
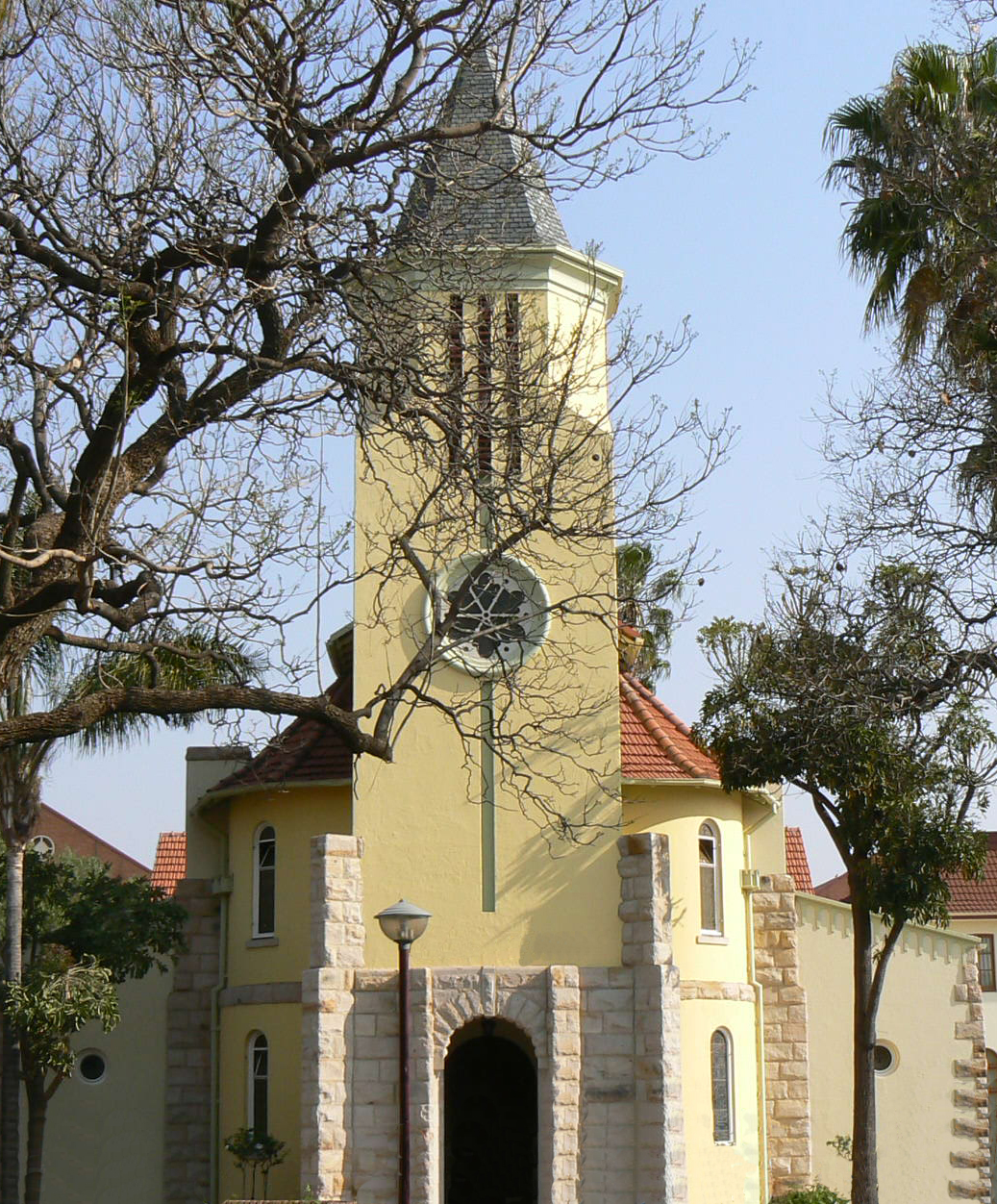
The University Chapel

The main hall and site of ceremonies, the Aula, was designed by Karel Jooste and completed in 1958. The Aula was the first opera house to be built in the capital and remained the major venue in the city until the State Theatre's completion in the early 1980s. The 1012-seat auditorium has played host to foreign dignitaries, presidents and local and international artists. The main music complex, comprising the 500-seat Musaion and 3000-seat Amphitheatre, was built between 1960 and 1964. The University Chapel, formally the Church of Saint Alfons Maria de Liguori, and the accompanying monastery, was built in 1925 and was bought from the Catholic Church in 1980. Saint Alfons, who was canonised in 1839, was the founder of the order of Ligournians (or Redemptorists), an order founded in 1732 in Naples, Italy and dedicated to helping underprivileged communities.

== Other campuses ==
=== Onderstepoort, Pretoria ===
The possibility of training veterinarians in South Africa was frequently raised after the first Colonial Veterinary Surgeon in South Africa was appointed in approximately 1874, but it was not until 1920 that the Swiss-born veterinarian, Sir Arnold Theiler, was appointed as Director of Veterinary Education and Research at Onderstepoort under the supervision of the then Transvaal University College. New facilities were inaugurated at the end of 1921 and the first residence was opened in 1924. The first eight South African trained veterinarians qualified in 1924.

The Faculty of Veterinary Sciences was developed on the 65 hectares (160 acres) Onderstepoort campus, with buildings covering a total of 55,000 square metres (590,000 sq ft) 30 kilometres (19 mi) north-west of the Hatfield campus and 15 kilometres (9.3 mi) north of the Pretoria city center. The Onderstepoort Veterinary Academic Hospital provides clinical services rendered with full student participation as part of the primary teaching mission of the Faculty of Veterinary Science. It is the only faculty in South Africa educating veterinarians and veterinary nurses.

=== Groenkloof, Pretoria ===
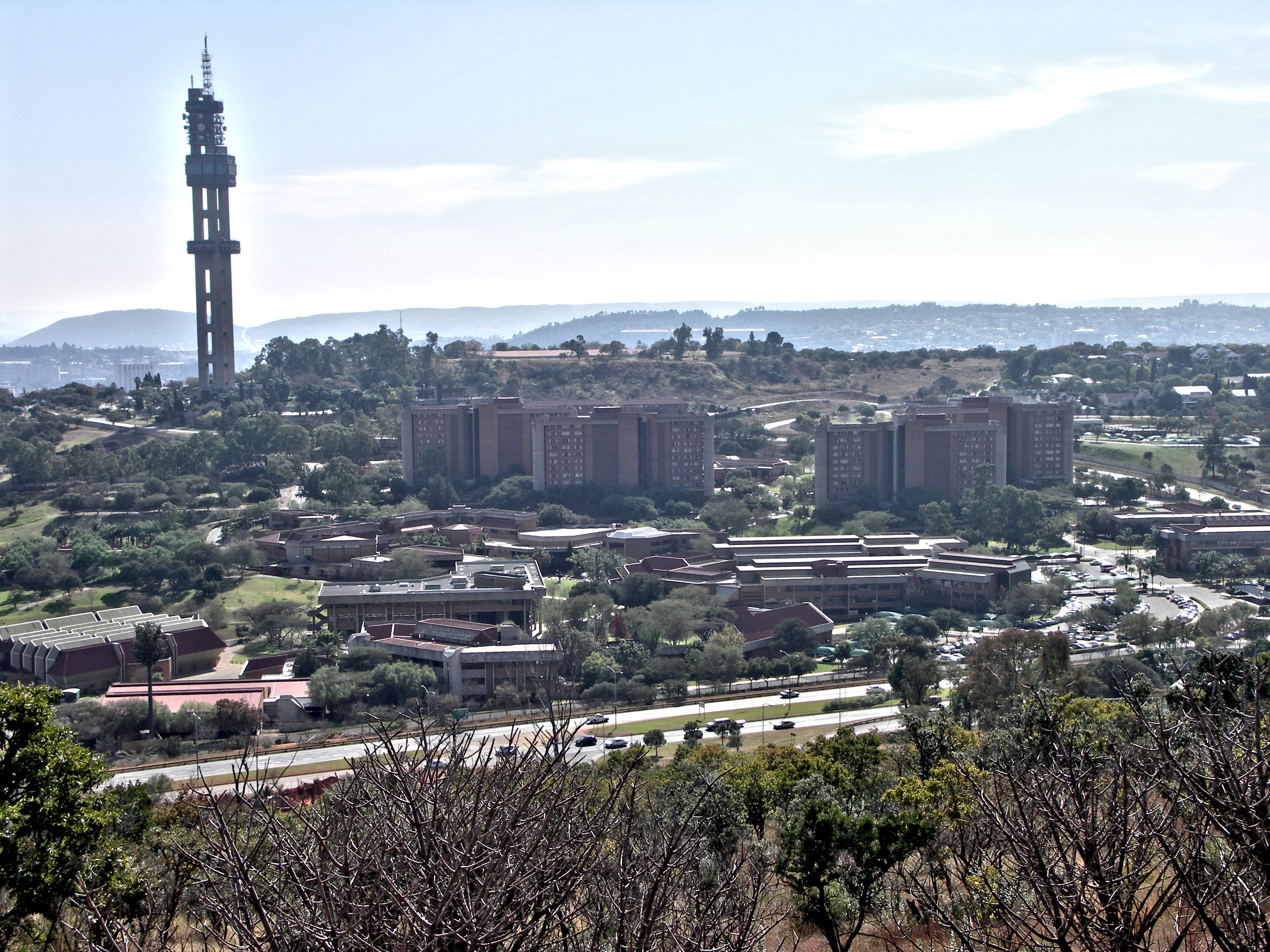
Groenkloof campus as seen from Klapperkop hill.

During the Conference of Teachers in Town and Refugee Camp Schools of the Transvaal and Orange River Colony of 1–10 July 1902, a resolution was passed to establish "Normal Schools" for the education of teachers in Johannesburg and Pretoria. The Pretoria Normal School, was first established in a house in 126 Rissik Street. In 1903 the Johannesburg Normal School's 40 students were transferred to Pretoria when it was closed and the Pretoria and Johannesburg institutions were merged to form the Transvaal Normal College. When the Transvaal University College was established in 1908 the first students include students from the Transvaal Normal College. In 1909 the school was renamed the Pretoria Normal College when new teacher training facilities were established in Heidelberg and Johannesburg. In 1954 the school was again renamed to the Onderwyskollege van Pretoria (English: Teachers College Pretoria). In 1974 the University of Pretoria took over the sole responsibility for training secondary teacher from the Teachers College Pretoria.

Although the Teachers College Pretoria purchased new college grounds in Groenkloof during 1975, the college only occupied the new grounds in 1988 and was inaugurated in 1989. The Johannesburg Goudstadse Onderwyskollege, 'Gold-city Teachers College', Transvaal College of Education, Laudium and the Transvaal Education College Soshanguve amalgamated and moved their operations to the Teachers College Pretoria in 1993 and the latter two in 1998 respectively. In 2000 the Teachers Training College Pretoria was incorporated into the university's Faculty of Education, which saw the faculty moving from the main Hatfield campus to the self-sufficient Groenkloof campus.

=== Prinshof, Pretoria ===
25°43′57″S 28°12′10″E

Students in the Faculty of Health Sciences are taught at the Prinshof campus, adjoining the Steve Biko Hospital (formerly Pretoria Academic Hospital and HF Verwoerd Hospital), the main healthcare training facility of the university, and the Tshwane District Hospital. Additional healthcare training facilities include the Kalafong Hospital on the western outskirts of Pretoria in the suburb of Atteridgeville, the Weskoppies Psychiatric Hospital west of the city centre and built on the site of the old Pretoria botanical gardens and Tembisa Hospital south of Pretoria in the East Rand, Johannesburg.

=== Illovo, Johannesburg ===
The university's business school, the Gordon Institute of Business Science (GIBS) purpose-designed by the architect and urban designer Henri Comrie, is situated along Illovo Boulevard, a mixed-use commercial precinct between the suburbs of Rosebank and Sandton in Johannesburg, with a satellite Inner City campus on Pritchard Street. The Illovo campus is served by the Rosebank Gautrain station, with a nearby Gautrain bus stop and the inner city campus by the Johannesburg Park Station. GIBS Europe operates out of London, United Kingdom offering company specific programmes.

=== Other sites ===
The Witbank and Hammanskraal satellite campuses, were established in 1988 and 1994 respectively and are used as additional practical facilities and for community engagement. The now defunct Vista University's Mamelodi campus was incorporated on 2 January 2004, as part of the restructuring of South African tertiary institutions. The Mamelodi campus hosts the extended BSc degree programme and functions as the community engagement hub for the university.

== Academics ==
=== Library system ===
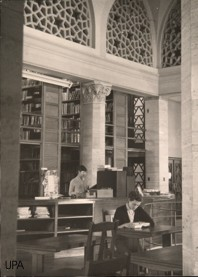
The Old Merensky Library

"This country has given me so much that I am only too happy to be allowed to help it to develop and to be able to give back to it a fraction of what it has given to me".

— Hans Merensky
at the opening of the Merensky Library ".

In 1933, the university decided that the library collection necessitated the building of a new library building, the collection which at that time was kept in the Old Arts building. The library was designed by the South African architect Gerard Moerdijk, following a donation of £10,000 (£592,201 as of 2023) from mining geologist Hans Merensky and construction started in 1937. Drawing from his inspiration from Persia and Africa, the design of the building incorporates several architectural styles including Art Deco, Neo-Classicism, Arts and Crafts, Cape Dutch and Regency. The Old Merensky Library was proclaimed a provincial heritage site in 1991.

Despite expansions to the Old Merensky Library in 1957, the library subsequently became insufficient to meet the growing needs of the institution and in 1975 the Merensky Library II was completed, currently housing 7 of 9 the faculty libraries. Besides the main Merensky Library complex, the university library system also includes the separately administered Jotello F Soga Library (Veterinary Science), Oliver R Tambo Law Library, Education Library, Mamelodi Library, Dentistry Library and Health Sciences Library.

The Oliver R Tambo Law Library houses the Faculty of Law's collection of legal materials and the Law of Africa collection in the library is the single most comprehensive and current collection of primary legal materials of African countries.

In 1974 the Jotello F Soga Library of the Faculty of Veterinary Science at the Onderstepoort campus was established and is named in honour of the first South African to qualify as a veterinary surgeon, Dr Jotello Festiri Soga.

In 2006 the university established UPSpace, its own open access digital research repository. and the university's library has since become one of 27 partners in the World Digital Library project.

=== Archives ===
In 1978 the first task group responsible for the investigation in creating an archive system for the University of Pretoria was chaired by Prof. Adriaan Nicolaas Petrus Pelzer (Vice-rector). Due to the death of Prof. Pelzer in 1981 the project stalled, but by 1994 the need for a central archive system was again recognised by the acting Registrar, Prof. C.R. de Beer. The archives were finally established by 13 September 1994 by the Management of the university and this date is considered as the founding date of the archives of the University of Pretoria.

=== Research ===
The Faculty of Humanities building, designed by alumnus Brian Sandrock, was constructed over Roper Street in 1977

The university's achievements and performance in research locally and internationally, including its collaboration and cooperation with the private sector, industry, science councils, foundations and NGOs, the large number of graduates that it produces (particularly doctoral and other postgraduate students) as well as scientists and engineers and its focus on innovation, contribute directly towards enhancing the South Africa's competitiveness. A 2010 report by Centre for Higher Education Transformation identified the university as a top research-intensive university in South Africa. The university is member of the CDIO Initiative, an international engineering education collaboration.

The strategic alliance formed in 1999 between the University of Pretoria and the Council for Scientific and Industrial Research (CSIR), has been abandoned for unpublished reasons. This alliance, which was known as the Southern Education and Research Alliance (SERA), collaborated locally and internationally with universities, NGOs, companies and multinational bodies in various research areas.

Notable research includes:

- Centre for Human Rights
- Forestry and Agricultural Biotechnology Institute (FABI)
- African Centre for Genome Technologies
- Department of Zoology & Entomology

=== Digital institutional repositories ===
==== UPeTD ====
UPeTD (University of Pretoria electronic theses and dissertations) was launched in July 2000 and forms part of the university's open scholarship programme. In August 2021, the Webometrics World Ranking of Institutional Repositories, UPSpace is ranked 130th Internationally, 2nd in Africa and 1st in South Africa. The records in UPeTD were migrated to the UPSpace institutional repository in August 2014, and UPeTD was subsequently discontinued.

==== UPSpace ====
UPSpace (Institutional research repository of the University of Pretoria) is the name of the open access digital institutional repository of the University of Pretoria, established as a means for the management and dissemination of digital materials created by the institution and its community members. UPSpace contains a collection of the intellectual and research output produced by past and current researchers of the University of Pretoria. The spectrum of material covered includes the following: historical or archival material, research articles, popular research material, unpublished research, inaugural addresses, conference proceedings, technical reports and open lectures.

=== Reputation and ranking ===
University rankings

Global – Overall
- ARWU World: 401–500 (2023)
- QS World: =362 (2026)
- THE World: 501–600 (2024)

League table rankings

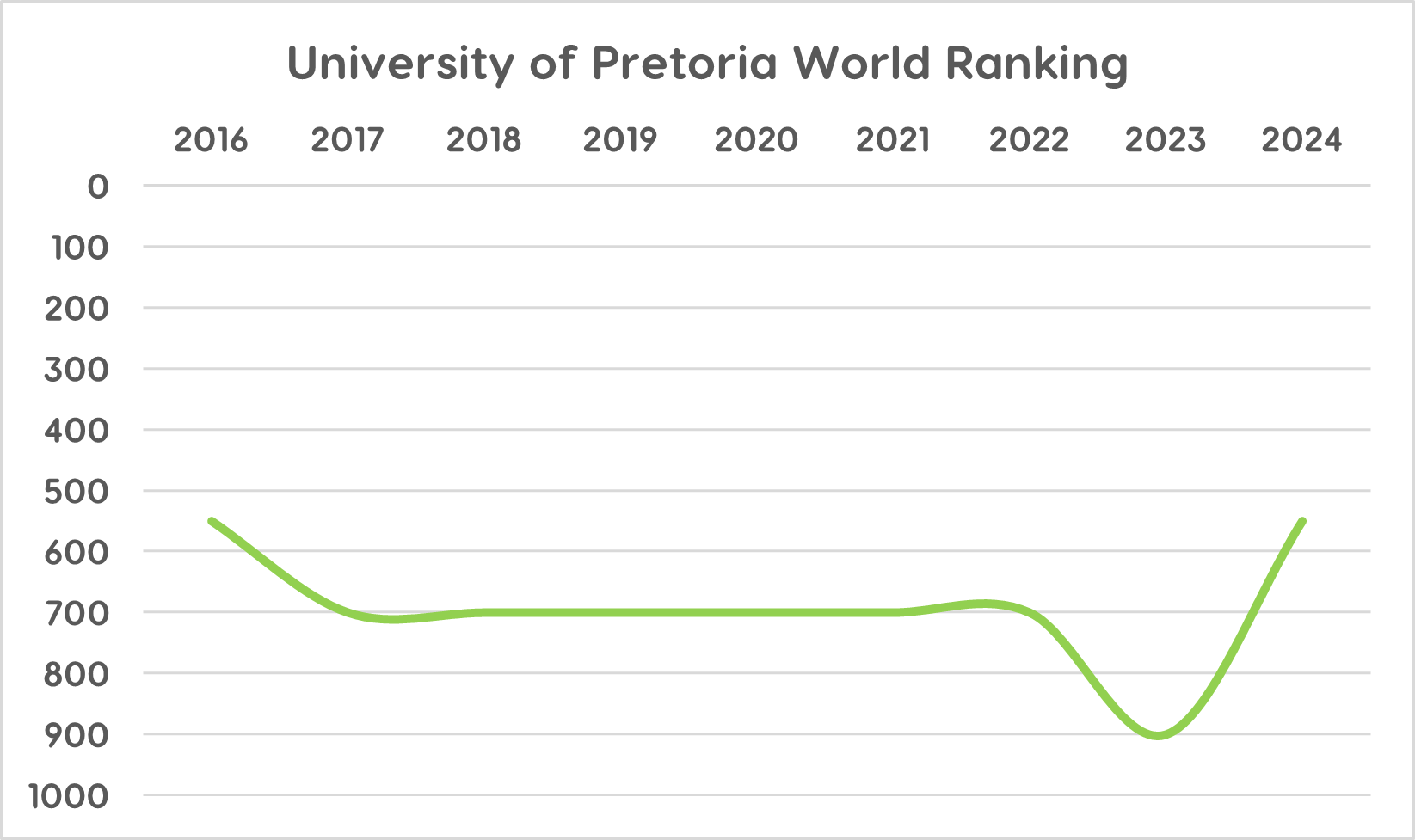
University of Pretoria World Ranking

UP Times Higher Education Ranking 2016 to 2024
Year	World Rank
2024	501–600
2023	801–1000
2022	601–800
2021	601–800
2020	601–800
2019	601–800
2018	601–800
2017	601-800
2016	501-600

The QS World University Rankings ranks the university as follows:

Year	World rank	Art & Humanities	Archaeology	Biological Sciences	Engineering & IT	Life Sciences	Agriculture & Forestry	Theology	Social Sciences
2020	551–570	383	151–200	301–350	364	348	51–100	51–100	320
2019	561–570	365	151–200	301–350	401–450	360	101–150	51–100	334
2018	501–550	345	151–200	351–400	—	391	101–150	51–100	398
2017	451–500	351–400	151–200	301–350	351–400	—	101–150	51–100	351–400
2016	401–500	—	—	301–400	291	—	101–150	—	—
2015	501+	—	—	301–400	—	—	101–150	—	—
2014	469	405	—	—	368	367	51–100	—	290

Financial Times World Ranking	2007	2008	2009	2010	2011	2012	2013	2104	2015	2016	2017	2018	2019	2020
Executive MBA	-	-	-	-	67	60	70	80	87	74	87	67	82	
Executive Education Customised	49	51	41	38	-	42	–	53	53	45	41	51	45	60
Executive Education Open	39	38	49	50	49	47	–	45	48	46	52	45	38	32

In January 2011 Webometrics ranked the university as the 2nd in South Africa and Africa.

In January 2015 Webometrics ranked the university as the 3rd in South Africa and 4th Africa.

In July 2015 Webometrics ranked the university as the 4th in South Africa and Africa.

GIBS again ranks in the top 100 – UK Financial Times Executive MBA Ranking 2019.

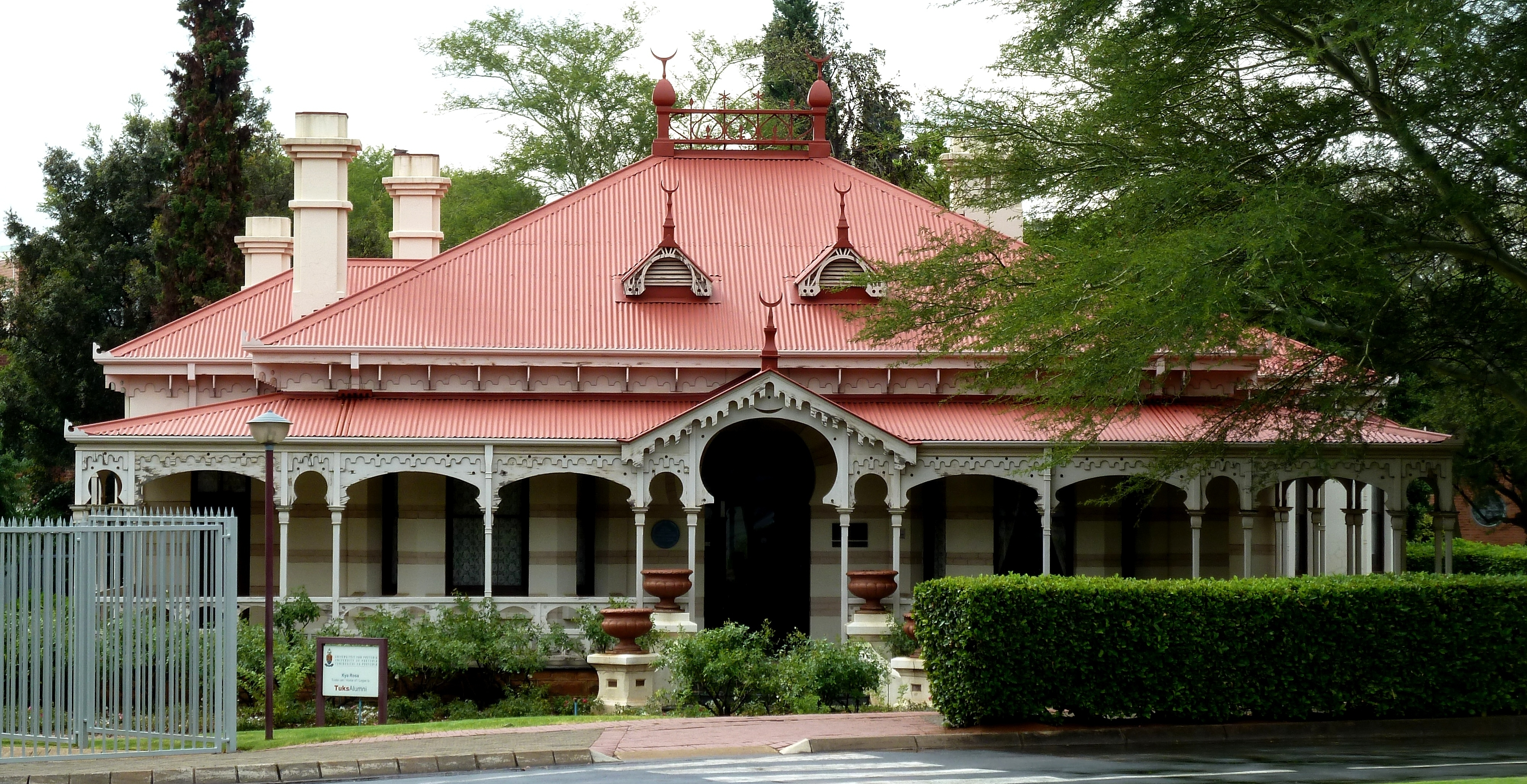
Kya Rosa, the original building of the Transvaal University College

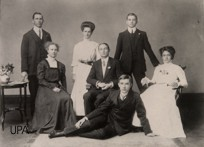
The first student council in 1909

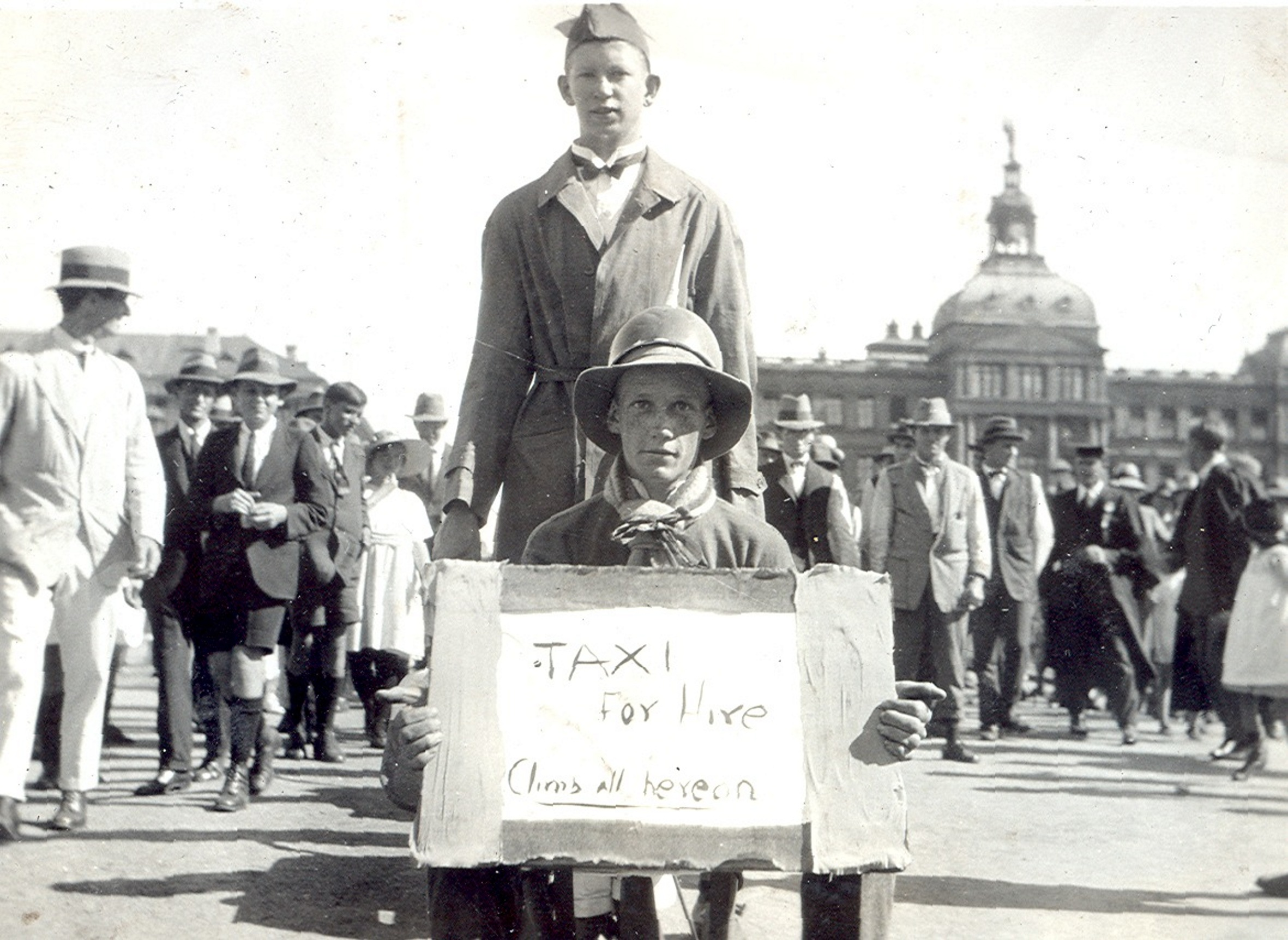
Rag festivities in Church Square in 1910

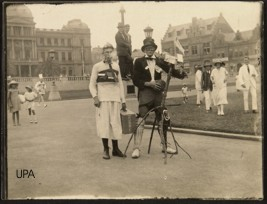
Welcoming day for first years in 1929

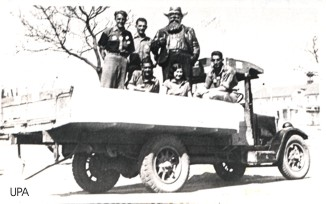
The university's mascot, Oom Gert in 1939

== Student life ==
Number of Student Registrations per Ethnic Group
Ethnic Group	2020	%	2021	%	2022	%	2023	%
African	26,831	52%	29,542	54.79%	31,281	57.4%	31,928	56%
Coloured	1,558	3%	1,680	3.11%	1,758	3.2%	1,759	3%
Indian	3,205	6.2%	3,516	6.52%	3,452	6.3%	3,567	6,2%
White	19,336	37.9%	19,141	35.5%	17,929	32.9%	20	0,03%
Undisclosed	25	0.1%	33	0.1%	46	0.1%	16,737	29,36%
Total	50,955	100%	53,912	100%	54,446	100%	57,011	100%

=== Residential life ===
Residence is provided to students in 24 undergraduate and postgraduate residences and 3 postgraduate-only residences spread over the university's campuses. The first students of the Transvaal University College resided in the Kya Rosa, a Victorian house in Skinner Street. In 1915, the first male residence, Kollegetehuis, was constructed on the Hatfield campus and the first female residence, Asterhof, in 1925. Students not living in a university residence can join one of four Day Houses ( Docendo, Dregeana, Luminous, and Vividus Ladies) which gives them the opportunity to partake in organised student life activities.

=== Student organisations ===
More than 100 student clubs and organisations operate on the university campus. These include numerous student government, service providers, and service organisations. The most prominent amongst these are the Student Parliament, Student Representative Council, and Constitutional Tribunal (Student Court). The Student Parliament is the plenary body of student governance and determines the wider mandate for student governance. The Student Representative Council (SRC) is the executive body of student governance and subsequently charters and provides most of the funding for other student groups, and represents students' interests when dealing with the administration. The SRC is the residential student government, specialising in programming, policy, and facilities and services. Societies are registered in the following categories as catering for religious, political, social, cultural, academic and other. The Constitutional Tribunal is the judicial body of student governance and adjudicates disputes primarily between student organisations. Its judges sit on the panel of student disciplinary hearings. The various service providers are the university's primary programming organisations, serving as a centre of social, cultural, intellectual and recreational life.

=== Student activities ===
The university has a long tradition of student activities and traditions. It is common belief that if a blossom from a Jacaranda tree falls on your head, you will do well in the end-of-year exams. Other traditions and customs vary by residence, day house and faculty.

The university started the tradition of Rag (student society) (Afrikaans: Jool), a student-run charitable fundraising organisation, in South Africa in 1925. During Rag, students take to the streets in a parade of floats whilst collecting money for charity.

The university's Springday celebrations are a declared university holiday and are held annually on the second Wednesday of September.

Students' song and dance competitions include Insync (formerly Ienkmelodienk), Serenade and Serrie. In addition, the university's Drama Department hosts the annual week-long Krêkvars Arts Festival each July in the intimate Bok, Lier and Masker theatres on Hatfield campus. The festival has transformed from an event started in 2000 and centred around the drama honours students' directing course to an open festival where other students and the public at large are encouraged to put on productions.

The amphitheatre hosts the annual Insync song and dance competition between the first years of the various residences and day houses in January. The annual Serenade and Serrie singing competitions between the residences and day houses are held in the Musaion and Aula theatres in July/August and April/May respectively. The winners of the Serenade competition go on to represent the university at the National Serenade competition.

The university maintains the: UP Symphony Orchestra (UPSO), the only comprehensive student orchestra in Pretoria frequently performing symphonic repertoires, UP Chorale, UP Brass Band, Tuks Camerata, UP Children's choir, UP Concert choir and the UP Youth choir. The university supports, and has been host to the annual National Youth Orchestra course for a number of years.

In addition to cultural activities, students participate in several other non-cultural activities. The university organises the annual SAE International sanctioned student automotive engineering Baja SAE competition in South Africa sponsored by Sasol. Baja SAE is an intercollegiate and interuniversity design competition run by the Society of Automotive Engineers (SAE) where teams of engineering students design, build and race small off-road cars.

=== Mascot ===
Oom Gert (translates affectionately to Uncle Gert, from Dutch and Afrikaans) has been the official university mascot since 1929 and has been the object of perennial attempted kidnappings.

=== Student media ===
The Perdeby (lit. The Wasp), the official university newspaper, was founded in 1939 and has a readership of approximately 30 000. Tuks FM (107.2 FM), the campus radio station, was established on 9 February 1981 and is hosted by university students and broadcast to the Northern Gauteng area.

=== Civic service ===
Civic service and outreach programmes are performed in the fields in which the university has proven competencies. These fields include professional associations, business and management and are performed in underdeveloped or developing communities.

== Sport ==
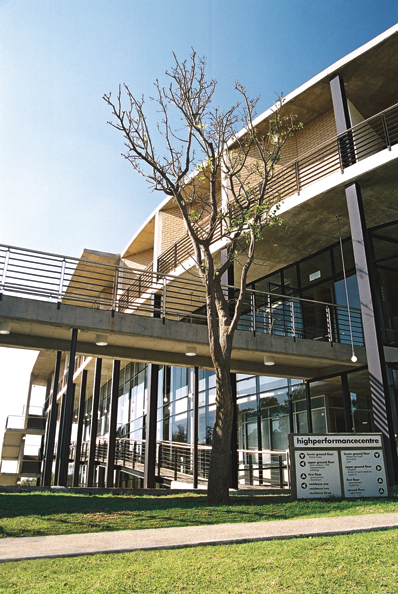
The High Performance Centre on the LC de Villiers Sport Grounds

The university maintains a long tradition of student participation in sport and recreation. The university has 30 registered sport clubs and 10 academies, in which 9 000 students annually participate in on a competitive and recreational level, more than 1 000 volunteers are involved in sport in various designations and capacities. In 2007, the university produced 93 Senior Proteas and Springboks and 4 South Africa national rugby union team (Springbok) Captains. The university's sports facilities, on the Hillcrest campus, include the LC de Villiers Sports Grounds and the High Performance Centre (HPC), situated at an altitude of approximately 1,500 metres (4,900 ft) above sea level, were developed on an area of 760,000 square metres (8,200,000 sq ft).

The HPC, which was established in 2002, has become the favoured location for the pre-departure camps of Team South Africa in addition to being chosen by several national and international federations as their preferred specialisation centre.

The HPC has a bifurcated role between hosting the TuksSport academies and hosting athletes and teams for pre-season or pre-event training. The HPC includes the Institute for Sport Research, Sport Science and Medical Unit and the Sports Law Centre.

HPC's TuksSport High School, established in 2002, is an independent specialised co-ed sports school catering for Grade 8 – 12 learners following the National Curriculum as offered by the Gauteng Department of Education. The school is supported by several national sporting federations and allows learners to train and travel internationally whilst staying in school.

=== Rugby ===
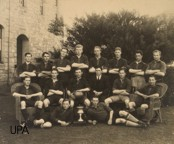
University of Pretoria Rugby team circa 1930

Rugby is a particularly popular sport, and there are competitions between residences, faculties, and the university participates in the National Club Championships, Carlton Cup and the Varsity Cup Rugby Union tournament, involving the top 8 rugby playing universities in the South Africa. In the 2012 and 2013 seasons, the university won the Varsity Cup and the under 20-year-old Varsity Rugby Young Guns competitions.

The Tuks Rugby League Football Club, based at the University of Pretoria, compete in the Rhino Cup (First Division) as TUKS Reds and in the Protea Cup (Second Division) as the TUKS Blues. In the 2012–13 season, the Reds won the Rhino Cup Final and the Blues won the Protea Cup Final.

=== Mind Sports ===
The university has a very active club that was only founded in 2013. The club is affiliated to Mind Sports South Africa and caters for all the disciplines that are controlled by such National Federation.

The club has had some major successes in 2014, with no less than 12 gamers qualifying for National Team Trials. The club has also become the top university club in South Africa.

=== Football ===
In 2002 the university established the Tuks Football Academy and the University of Pretoria F.C. oginally playing in the SAFA Gauteng South Division. In the 2003–04 season the university acquired Pretoria City F.C.'s second division status, subsequently winning the National First Division (NFD) Vodacom League play-offs and being promoted to the NFD in 2004–05. In the 2006–07 season the club qualified for the Mvela Golden League play-offs. In the 2008–09 season the club was a Nedbank Cup finalist losing to Premier Soccer League team Moroka Swallows 0–1.

Following the 2011/2012 season the University of Pretoria F.C. gained promotion to the South African Premier Soccer League (PSL), the top domestic league.

== Alumni and people ==
The university, in more than a century of academic service, has delivered more than 250 000 alumni.

Alumni in commerce include several CEOs of JSE Top 50 and American Fortune 500 companies. Dr. Anton Rupert was a South African entrepreneur, businessman, conservationist and founder of the Rembrandt Group, which eventually split up into Remgro, Richemont, the second-largest luxury goods company in the world by turnover, and Reinet Investments, as of January 2008 the largest component of the Luxembourg Stock Exchange. He was honoured as Tukkie of the century, former chancellor of the university, and a major benefactor of the university. Marius Kloppers was the CEO of BHP, the world's largest mining company and named by CNN Money as the world's 18th most powerful person in business. Johan De Nysschen was the former president at Audi Japan and is the current president of Audi America. Russell Loubser is a former CEO of the Johannesburg Stock Exchange, and a member of the team that started the futures industry in South Africa in 1987. Meyer Kahn is the Chairman of SABMiller the second largest brewer in the world.

Alumni in law include several Judges of the High Court, Supreme Court of Appeal and Constitutional Court as well as serving as United Nations Special Rapporteurs and the United Nations International Law Commission. Johann van der Westhuizen is a judge in the Constitutional Court of South Africa. He was appointed to the bench in 2004 by Thabo Mbeki. He was previously a professor at the University of Pretoria Faculty of Law and the founding director of the university's Centre for Human Rights. He currently sits on the board of the Centre for Human Rights and the University of Pretoria Council. Johann Kriegler is a former Constitutional Court and Appeal Court judge from South Africa. Christof Heyns (10 January 1959 – 28 March 2021), a former director (1999–2006) of the Centre for Human Rights, was a professor of human rights law, co-director of the Institute for International and Comparative Law in Africa at the University of Pretoria and United Nations Special Rapporteur on extrajudicial, summary or arbitrary executions. Dire Tladi is a former Principal State Law Adviser for International Law for the South African Department of International Relations and Cooperation, legal advisor to the South Africa Mission to the United Nations and member of the United Nations International Law Commission.

Alumni in divinity include several theologians. Albert Geyser was a South African cleric, scholar and anti-apartheid theologian. He was one of the first Afrikaner nationalists to speak out against the Broederbond and apartheid on theological grounds. He is also known for his work as one of a number of scholars involved in the first annotated edition (1953–1958) of the Bible in Afrikaans. Johan Heyns, was an influential Afrikaner Calvinist theologian and moderator of the general synod of the Nederduits Gereformeerde Kerk (NGK). He was assassinated, although his murder was never officially resolved it is widely believed that it was directly related to his criticism of Apartheid. Nelson Mandela paid homage to him as a martyr for his country and a soldier of peace.

Alumni include several sporting personalities. South Africa national rugby union team member's (Springboks) associated with the university include coach Heyneke Meyer and former Springbok captains Victor Matfield, Wynand Claassen, Naas Botha and Joost van der Westhuizen. Other notable sporting personalities include Caster Semenya, Tatjana Schoenmaker and Oscar Pistorius, who became the first double amputee runner at an Olympic Games when he competed at the London 2012 Summer Olympics.

Graduate with a banner of the TUC

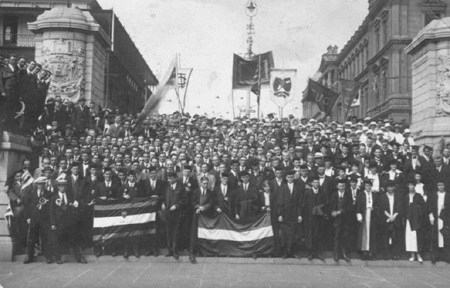
Graduation ceremony in 1918

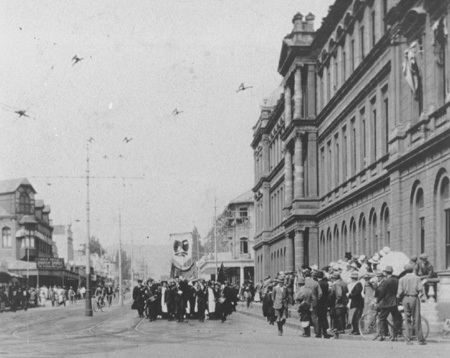
Graduation ceremony in 1920

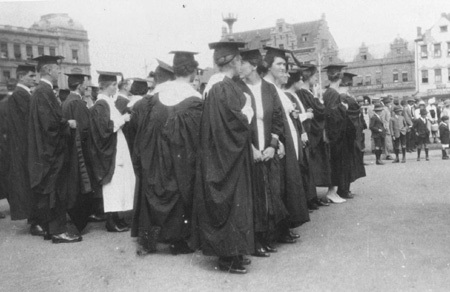
Graduation ceremony in 1922

== Campus and Policy Issues ==
In 2022, when the university allegedly owed Tshwane R34 million in outstanding municipal bills, Tshwane moved to disconnect the water and power supply of their Hillcrest campus. The university paid up under protest at the last minute, stating that an interruption would compromise various facilities including student residences, sensitive research equipment and experiments, data centres and live animals.

The university's medical school has been ranked among the top five in the country. In 2022 Dr Angelique Coetzee, then chairwoman of the South African Medical Association, stated in a radio interview that admission processes at medical schools are highly politicized, and that medical faculties implement race quotas. After she apologized for her statements and resigned as chairwoman, Dirk Hermann of Solidarity reiterated that race-based admission processes were explicitly included in admission policies, and stated that these were detrimental to white students and health care.

The University of Pretoria has issued public statements condemning all forms of discrimination, including racism and religious intolerance. In March 2023, the university reiterated its commitment to these principles following a surge of anti-Jewish sentiment on campus. During this period, the Student Representative Council (SRC) had aligned with the Palestine Solidarity Committee (PSC) and excluded the South African Union of Jewish Students (SAUJS). University authorities worked with the South African Jewish Board of Deputies (SAJBD) to help ensure the safety and freedom of students who were reportedly subjected to antisemitic or discriminatory statements and actions on campus. A university spokesperson stated that necessary steps would be taken against anyone breaching the institution’s anti-discrimination policies and reaffirmed the university’s commitment to providing a safe environment for all students, regardless of race or religious belief.

== Notable faculty ==
- Maxi Schoeman (1954-2025), Social Scientist
- Theo Akkermann (1907–1982), German sculptor
- Conrad J. Wethmar, systematic theologian
- Johan Heyns, systematic theologian
- Lavagnon Ika, management scientist
- Shudufhadzo Musida, Miss South Africa 2020
- Lalela Mswane, Miss South Africa 2021 and Miss Supranational 2022

== See also ==
- De Goede Hoop Hostel
- Open access in South Africa
- List of South African open access repositories
