= Transvaal University College =

Former university in South Africa

- Former names: South African School of Mines (1896–1904); Transvaal Technical Institute(1904–1906)
- Type: Public university
- Active: 1896–1910/1930 The University of the Witwatersrand was named the Transvaal University College from 1906 to 1910. The University of Pretoria was named the Transvaal University College from 1908 to 1930.
- Location: Johannesburg and Pretoria, Gauteng, South Africa
- Nickname: TUC

Transvaal University College was a multi-campus public research university in South Africa which gave rise to the University of the Witwatersrand and the University of Pretoria.

== History ==
In 1896 the South African School of Mines was founded in Kimberley. Eight years later, in 1904, the school was moved to Johannesburg and was renamed the Transvaal Technical Institute. The school's name changed yet again in 1906 to Transvaal University College. On 4 March 1908 the Transvaal University College (TUC) transferred its arts and science courses to its newly established Pretoria Campus initially offering courses in languages, sciences, and law. In 1910 the Colonial Secretary, General Jan Smuts tabled the act constituting the university as a separate entity before the Transvaal Parliament, the "Transvaalse Universiteits-Inlijvingswet", Law 1 of 1910. The Johannesburg and Pretoria campuses separated on 17 May 1910, each becoming a separate institution.

== University of the Witwatersrand ==
The Johannesburg campus was reincorporated as the South African School of Mines and Technology which in 1920 was renamed the University College, Johannesburg and ultimately became the University of the Witwatersrand on 1 March 1922. The University of the Witwatersrand, named the Transvaal University College from 1906 to 1910, is the third oldest South African university in continuous operation.

== University of Pretoria ==
Instruction commenced in 1908 with 32 students, 4 professors and 3 lecturers in the Kya Rosa, 270 Skinner Street a late Victorian residence purchased from Leo Weinthal the then owner of The Press (forerunner to the Pretoria News Newspaper). The first four professors were Prof H. Th. Reinink (Dutch), J. Purves (Scottish), D.F. du Toit Malherbe (South African) and A.C. Paterson (Scottish), who would also become the first Vice-Chancellor.

The Pretoria campus remained the Transvaal University College until 10 October 1930 when it became the University of Pretoria when the University of Pretoria Private Act, No. 13 of 1930 was promulgated. During this time the colloquial name for the university, Tukkies or Tuks, was derived from the Afrikaans acronym for the college — Transvaalse Universiteits-Kollege (TUK). The University of Pretoria is the fourth South African institution in continuous operation to be awarded university status.

Graduate with a banner of the TUC in 1928

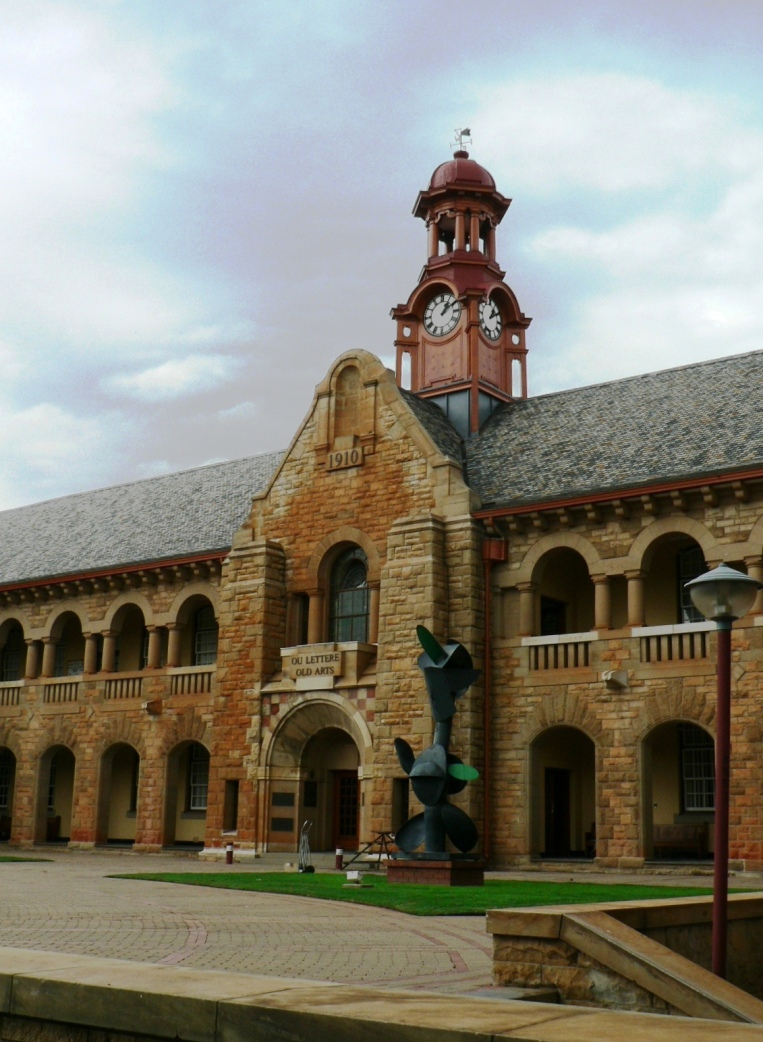
The University of Pretoria Old Arts building

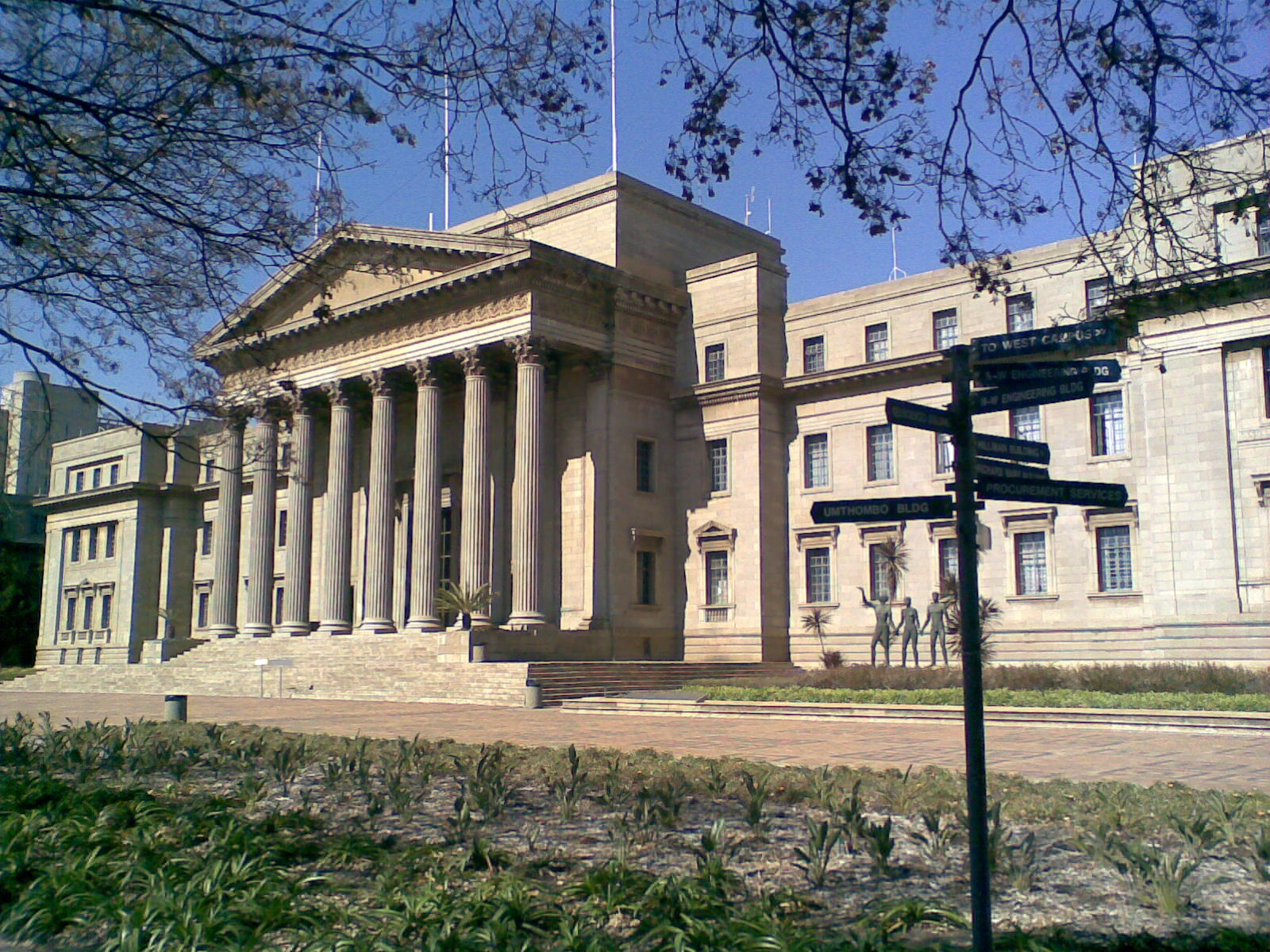
The University of the Witwatersrand Great Hall
