= Mabel Jansen (judge) =

South African judge

Her Honour Mabel Jansen SC
- Born: Maria Mabel Jansen
- Citizenship: South African
- Education: UNISA, BA LLB; LLM; Stellenbosch University, BA (Hons)
- Occupation: Former High Court Judge
- Years active: 22–23
- Employer: Gauteng High Court
- Title: Judge of the High Court
- Children: 2 daughters
- Relatives: Ernest George Jansen (grandfather), Martha Mabel Jansen (grandmother)
- Awards: Johannes Voet medal Grotius medal

Mabel Jansen SC is a former judge of the High Court of Gauteng and a lawyer specialising in intellectual property, mercantile and constitutional law. She has acted on behalf of many of the large companies in South Africa and has chaired several commissions of enquiry. She was the first woman to be elected chair of the Pretoria Bar Association. Jansen appeared in court in South Africa's first case concerning patents for genetic engineering.

In May 2017, she retired from the bar following media reports and a Judicial Service Commission investigation into opinions she expressed during an online conversation that the incidence of rape, child rape, and murder in South African black communities was due to those crimes being a pastime for black men

== Education and career ==
Jansen graduated from Stellenbosch University with a BA (Hons) in French and initially worked as an advertising copywriter at De Villiers and Schonfeldt, where she was involved in the creation of advertisements for Rembrandt Group, Wonderbra, Caltex, the Dried Fruit Board and other companies. Part of her responsibilities was the translation of the English advertisements into Afrikaans. She obtained a BA LLB (cum laude) followed by an LLM (cum laude) in property law from the University of South Africa (UNISA). The Pretoria Bar Association awarded her the Voet medal (named in honour of Johannes Voet) for the best final-year law student, as well as the Grotius Medal for most outstanding law student.

In 1994, Jansen was appointed an advocate of the Society of Advocates of SA and was appointed a Senior Counsel. At the time she was one of only two women practicing as advocates; by 2006 there were 80 female advocates but only 3 of them were senior counsel. Clients that she has acted on behalf of include Cipla Medpro, Bayer, McDonald's, The Body Shop, Pritt, Parmalat, Vodacom, Kellogg's, Monsanto, Cadbury's, Bakers Limited, the Whisky Association, Telkom, Ericsson, Sasol, Harley Davidson, Verimark, Mars, the Rembrand companies, BMW, and Adcock Ingram. She has appeared in more than 150 court cases.

Jansen has chaired several Commissions of Enquiry, including the investigation into the misdemeanours of Vice Chancellor A.T. Mokadi of the Vaal University of Technology, which uncovered fraud and corruption. This led to Mokadi's dismissal, although he was later re-instated (three times) after the charges of fraud and corruption were dropped. She also acted on behalf of the State Theatre, Pretoria, in the matter of Gaynor Young, who survived a fall of 18 metres (59 ft) down an open stage shaft at the theatre in 1989.

She was appointed a judge of the Gauteng High Court on 1 December 2013. Jansen has served as a member of the executive committee of the General Council of the Bar; served one term as the vice-chair of the general council and as chair of the Pretoria Society of Advocates in 2003 and 2004.

== Controversies ==
In May 2016, snippets of a conversation on Facebook between Jansen and social justice activist Gillian Schutte were subsequently reposted online by Schutte. In these snippets Jansen is quoted as saying "in their [black] culture, a woman is there to pleasure them" and that "the gang rape of babies, daughters and mothers is a pleasurable pastime for some." She is also quoted as saying "black people are by far no angels" and "their conduct is despicable."

Jansen responded to these statements on Twitter saying that they were made in the context of and specifically referred to rape cases she had presided over. She said that Schutte had taken the statements out of context. She further stated that instead of labelling her as a racist, South Africa should "address the real issue of protecting vulnerable women and children."

The ANC immediately called for her conduct to be addressed as "it gives a negative impression of the judiciary." Zizi Kodwa (spokesperson of the ANC in 2016) said that this "reveals that there are issues of stereotypes even within the bench."

The statements were condemned by several individuals and organisations including: the Ahmed Kathrada Foundation, which said that "her views might have had an impact on the cases of black offenders she presided over"; Lutendo Sigogo of the Black Lawyers Association described her comments as "gross misconduct" and said that the outcomes of Jansen's murder and rape cases must be reviewed; the Cabinet discussed "the furore" and outlined a hate speech draft bill; and several people expressed their outrage on social media.

The DA reported her statements to the Judicial Service Commission (JSC). Although other organisations and political parties stated their intention to report her to the JSC, the JSC confirmed that they only received one complaint.

In light of the complaint, the Minister of Justice Michael Masutha approved special leave for Jansen. The Black Lawyers Association called on Jansen to resign or, failing that, for the JSC to impeach her and called for a review of all the cases she had presided over.

Jansen referred to Schutte as a coward, claiming Schutte had endangered Jansen's family. Jansen resigned from her position as a judge on 4 May 2017.

== Personal life ==
There are several lawyers within Jansen's family-tree: her mother was one of the first women in South Africa to study law (but never practiced) and her father was an Appellate Division judge. Her grandfather, E.G. Jansen was a lawyer who later became Governor-General of the Union of South Africa. Her grandmother, Martha Mabel Jansen, was a writer, politician and proponent of Afrikaans.

Jansen is married and has two daughters.
