= Stephanus Le Roux Marais =

South African composer (1896–1979)

Stephanus le Roux Marais
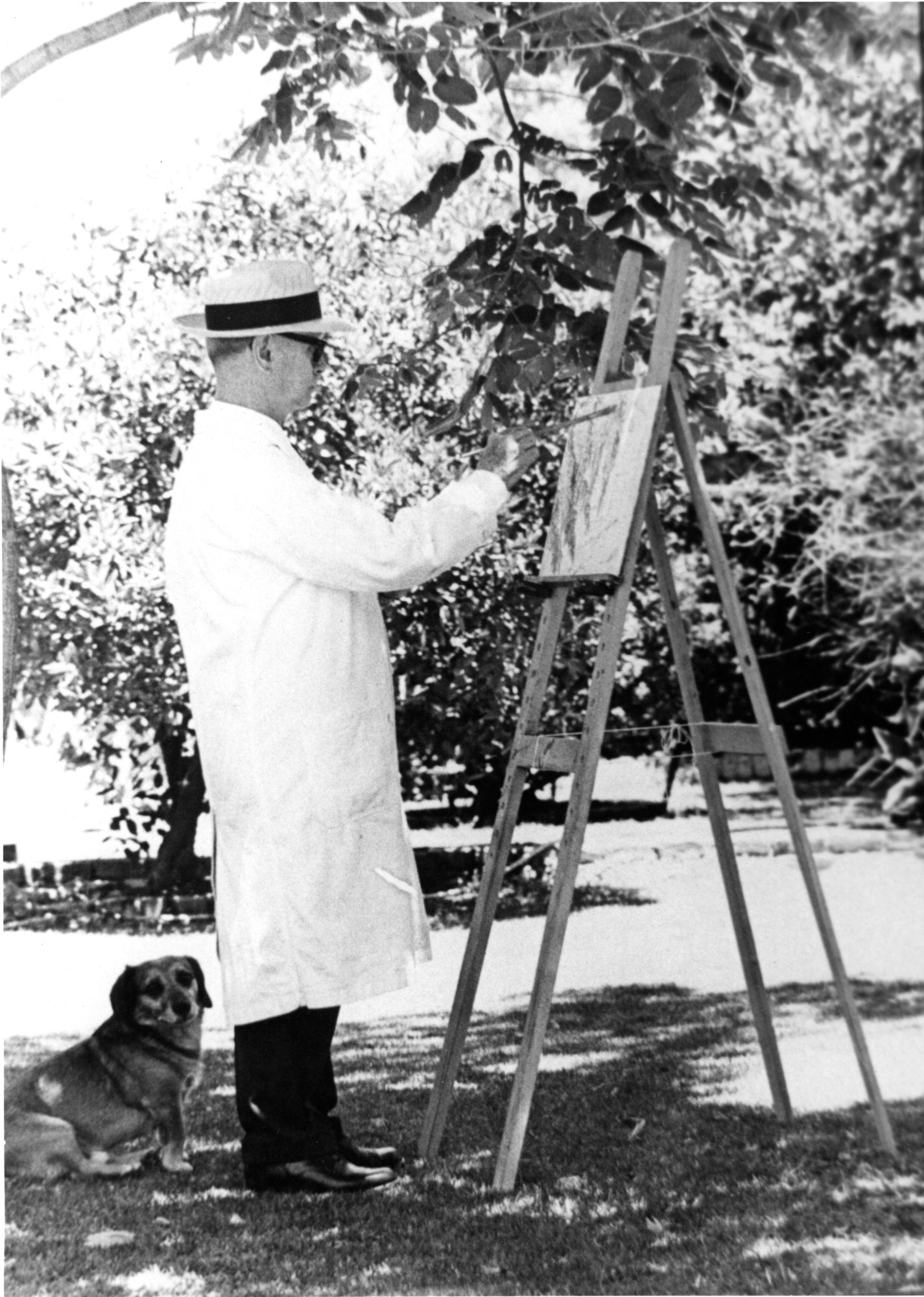
- Stephanus le Roux Marais (1896–1979)

Background information
- Born: Stephanus le Roux Marais; 1 February 1896; Aasvogelkop, Bloemfontein District, South Africa
- Died: 25 May 1979 (aged 83) Graaff-Reinet, South Africa
- Genres: Afrikaans art song
- Occupations: Composer, Organist, Music Teacher
- Instruments: Piano, Organ
- Years active: 1918–1979
- Spouse: Edith Johanna Rex

Stephanus le Roux Marais (1 February 1896 – 25 May 1979) was a South African composer known for his significant contribution to Afrikaans art song.

== Early life and education ==
Stephanus le Roux Marais was born on 1 February 1896, on the farm Aasvogelkop in the district of Bloemfontein, South Africa. His father, Jakobus Francois Marais, was initially a school teacher in the Republic of the Orange Free State and later became the principal of Daljosaphat Elementary School in 1901. Marais’s mother, Brechje Jakoba le Roux, died in 1898, after which his father remarried Hester Helena le Roux, who played a significant role in raising Stephanus and his siblings.

Marais began taking piano lessons at the age of eight. In 1910, after his father was ordained as a minister in Wepener, Marais continued his piano lessons under Miss A. Nowers. He matriculated in 1913 and then enrolled at the Bloemfontein Normal and Polytechnical College in 1914, where he studied music under P.K. de Villiers, who encouraged him to start composing. This marked the beginning of his commitment to a career in music.

In 1921, Marais studied at the South African College of Music under Prof. W.H. Bell (Theory and History of Music), Thomas Barrow-Dowling (Organ), and Pierre de Beer (Piano). He obtained a Teacher's Licentiate in 1923 and subsequently traveled to London to study at the Royal College of Music, earning the Associate of the Royal College of Music (ARCM) diploma in 1924. Returning to South Africa, he started his career as a rural music teacher and church musician, serving the Dutch Reformed Church for 36 years.

== Career and musical contributions ==
Marais held various posts across South Africa as an organist and music teacher. His career included roles in Bloemfontein North (1924–1926), Brandfort (1927–1929), Ermelo (1930–1940), Graaff-Reinet (1942–1944), Ficksburg (1944–1946), and Benoni North (1947–1955). He also lectured in school music and class singing at the Wellington Training College between 1941 and 1942. During his service to the Church, he organized concerts, often donating the proceeds to charity. His modesty and sincerity earned him the respect and affection of every community he served.

Marais's first composition, "Slaapdeuntjie," was completed in 1918 and later included in the FAK Sangbundel in 1937. It was during his time in Brandfort that he gained recognition as a composer, encouraged by the singer Mrs. B. du Preez. His song "Die Roos" won first prize at the Cape Town Eisteddfod in 1929, leading to further compositions, including "Geboorte van die lente" (1930) and "Malie die slaaf se lied" (1931). By 1934, he had received 23 distinctions at various eisteddfods and subsequently withdrew from competitions.

== Compositional style ==
Marais’s compositional style is often described as instinctive, characterized by its melodic warmth and simplicity. According to Holzapfel, Marais did not concern himself with formal compositional techniques or word-painting; instead, his works embraced a neo-romantic idiom with melodies that were emotionally charged and accessible to a wide audience. His songs, such as "Heimwee" and "Die Roos," display a clear, lyrical quality, reflecting a deep emotional resonance in their musical portrayal of themes like longing, nostalgia, and the South African landscape.

Despite his lack of formal composition training, Marais’s music exhibits a strong sense of melody, often described as straightforward and uncomplicated. This simplicity, however, does not detract from its aesthetic value; rather, it is seen as one of the defining features that made his music relatable and enduring. His use of traditional harmonic structures, with frequent shifts between major and minor tonalities, adds a melancholic depth to his compositions, enhancing their emotional impact.

== Significance, influence, and legacy ==
Stephanus le Roux Marais played a pivotal role in establishing Afrikaans art songs in the early 20th century, marking a transition from traditional folk music and patriotic songs to a more refined art song tradition modeled after European forms. His work captured the unique qualities of the Afrikaans language and culture, becoming deeply embedded in the consciousness of the Afrikaner community. Marais's work was part of a broader movement that sought to elevate Afrikaans as a language of literary and musical expression. According to Grové, the cultivation of an Afrikaans art song tradition in the 20th century aimed to 'make the Dutchman proud of his language,' reflecting a cultural and nationalistic sentiment among Afrikaners during this period. His compositions became an integral part of this movement, reinforcing the significance of the Afrikaans language in both domestic and artistic spheres. His music was widely disseminated through the Federasie van Afrikaanse Kultuurvereniginge (FAK) Sangbundel, the 20th-century South African equivalent of the German Des Knaben Wunderhorn. His songs, such as "Heimwee" and "Kom dans Klaradyn," gained popularity to the point that they were considered almost as national songs, reinforcing cultural and nationalistic ideals among Afrikaners.

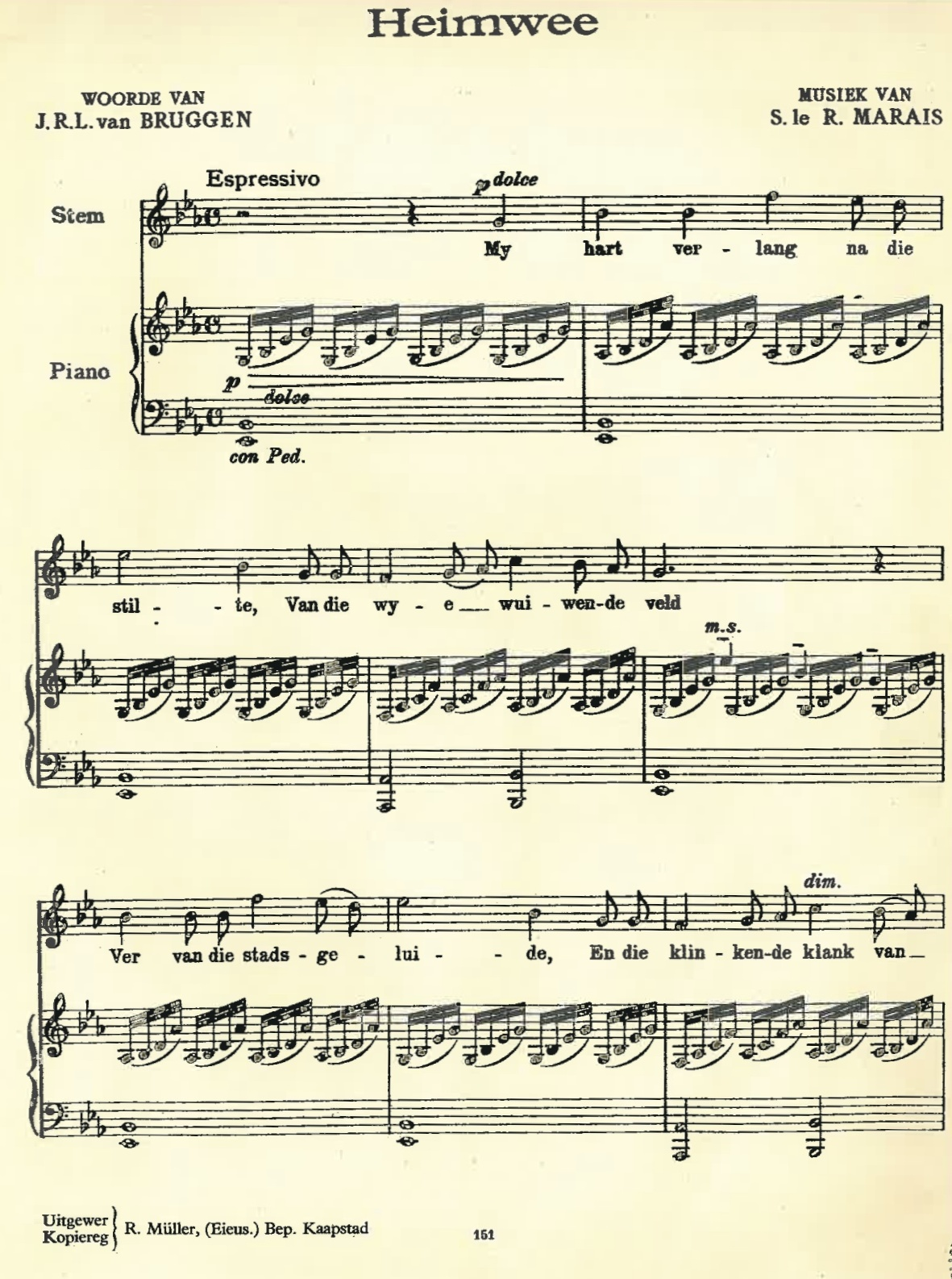
First page of S le Roux Marais's song 'Heimwee'.

Marais's music, described as "simple, uncomplicated," carried a sweet melancholy that resonated with the collective sentiment of the Afrikaner community. It played a role in shaping an imagined national identity, projecting a romanticized vision of the South African landscape. His compositions were seen as both a reflection of Afrikaner culture and an instrument for embedding a European influence within the South African environment. Despite critiques of aesthetic conservatism, Marais's works became cornerstones of Afrikaner cultural expression, admired for their accessibility and emotional depth.

His contributions to Afrikaans music were publicly recognized multiple times during his career. In 1946, he was honored by the Suid-Afrikaanse Akademie vir Wetenskap en Kuns with a medal at a special event in Bloemfontein. During this occasion, Prof. W.F.C. Arndt compared Marais's impact on Afrikaans music to Langenhoven's influence on Afrikaans literature, highlighting his role in fulfilling the Afrikaner's need for cultural expression in their language.

The legacy of Marais extended beyond his lifetime. His songs were widely performed by notable South African singers such as Betsy de la Porte, Louis Knobel, and Helena Strauss. Later, artists like Mimi Coertse, Hanlie van Niekerk, and Cato Brink propagated his works, introducing them to audiences abroad through concert recitals and recordings. In the post-apartheid era, Marais's music has been revisited and re-evaluated, reflecting its historical and cultural significance as well as the complexities of South African history. His legacy endures in his role in awakening the Afrikaner community's consciousness of the musical values of their language and in cementing Afrikaans as a "singing language."

== Works ==
Marais's body of work was extensive, including vocal pieces, instrumental works, and operettas. Below is a selected list based on the South African Music Encyclopaedia:

A. Vocal works

Published Songs (by R. Müller and later by Boosey & Hawkes):

- Four Afrikaans Songs (1928): "Wees sterk my siel" (J.F.E. Celliers), "Slaapdeuntjie" (J.R.L. van Bruggen), "Viermaal gesien" (Totius), and "Amors konfetti" (Jan Celliers).
- Heimwee (1930) (J.R.L. van Bruggen).
- Die roos en ander Afrikaanse liedere (1930): Includes "Die roos" (A.G. Visser), "Dis al" (J.F.E. Celliers), "As saans" (A.D. Keet), and others.
- Vyf kunsliedere (1932): Features "Voor jou en mij" (A. van Scheltema), "Geboorte van die lente" (A.G. Visser), "Malie die slaaf se lied" (Leipoldt), and "Sluimer beminde" (Dirk Mostert).
- Bosveld-toe en twee ander liedere (1934): "Bosveld-toe" (C.F. Visser), "Gee my!" (J.R.L. van Bruggen), and "Nuwe somer" (Eitemal).
- Kom dans Klaradyn (1936) (C.F. Visser).
- Ses kunsliedere (1938): Includes "Moder" (A.D. Keet) and "Bosveldhuisie" (Ben Dreyer).
- Lida en die liedjieskrywer (operetta, 4 acts, 1961, libretto: Joan Retief).

Unpublished wongs:

- Daybreak (Longfellow) (1919).
- Die blomtuin (operetta, libretto: S.J.M. Osborne, 1937).
- Various school songs, including "Ermelo School Song" (J.J. Spruyt) (1938) and "Potchefstroom School Song" (1949).

B. Instrumental works

- Mymeringe for piano (1916).
- Aubade for organ (1930).
- My eerste musiekboek (1946), dedicated to his wife, Edith Johanna Rex.

C. Songs included in the FAK Volksangbundel

- "Amors konfetti" (included in the 1st and 3rd editions).
- "As saans" (included in the 3rd edition).
- "Bosveldhuisie" (included in the 1st and 3rd editions).
- "Heimwee" (included in the 3rd edition).
- "Kom dans Klaradyn" (included in all three editions).
- "Die roos" (included in the 1st and 3rd editions).
- "Slaapdeuntjie" (included in the 1st edition).

== Personal life ==
In 1945, Marais married Edith Johanna Rex, a teacher of commercial subjects at the Union High School in Graaff-Reinet. They had no children, and Marais continued his involvement in music and painting. He retired as an organist in 1955 and settled in Graaff-Reinet, where he taught music until 1964. He died on 25 May 1979 in Graaff-Reinet.

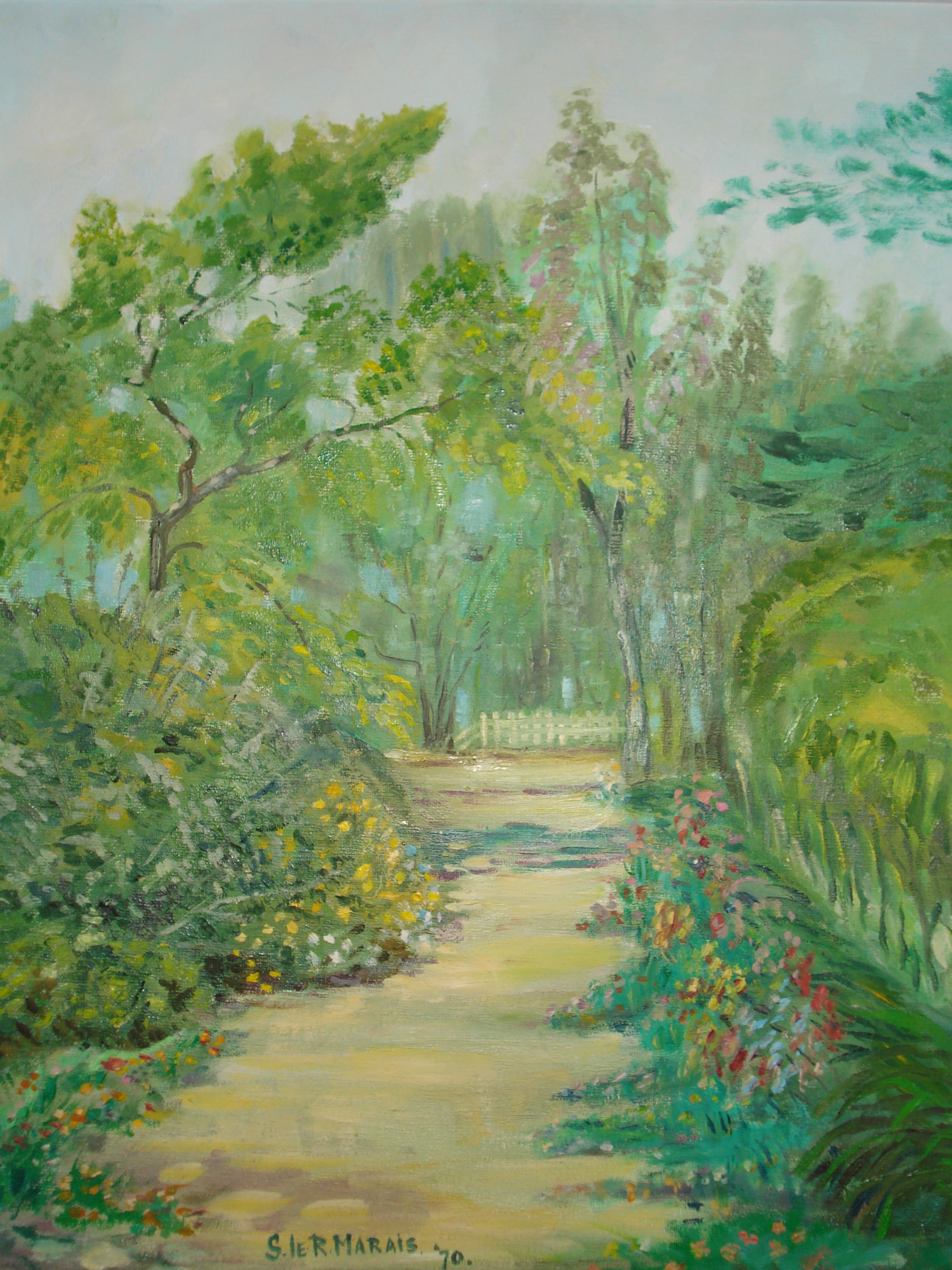

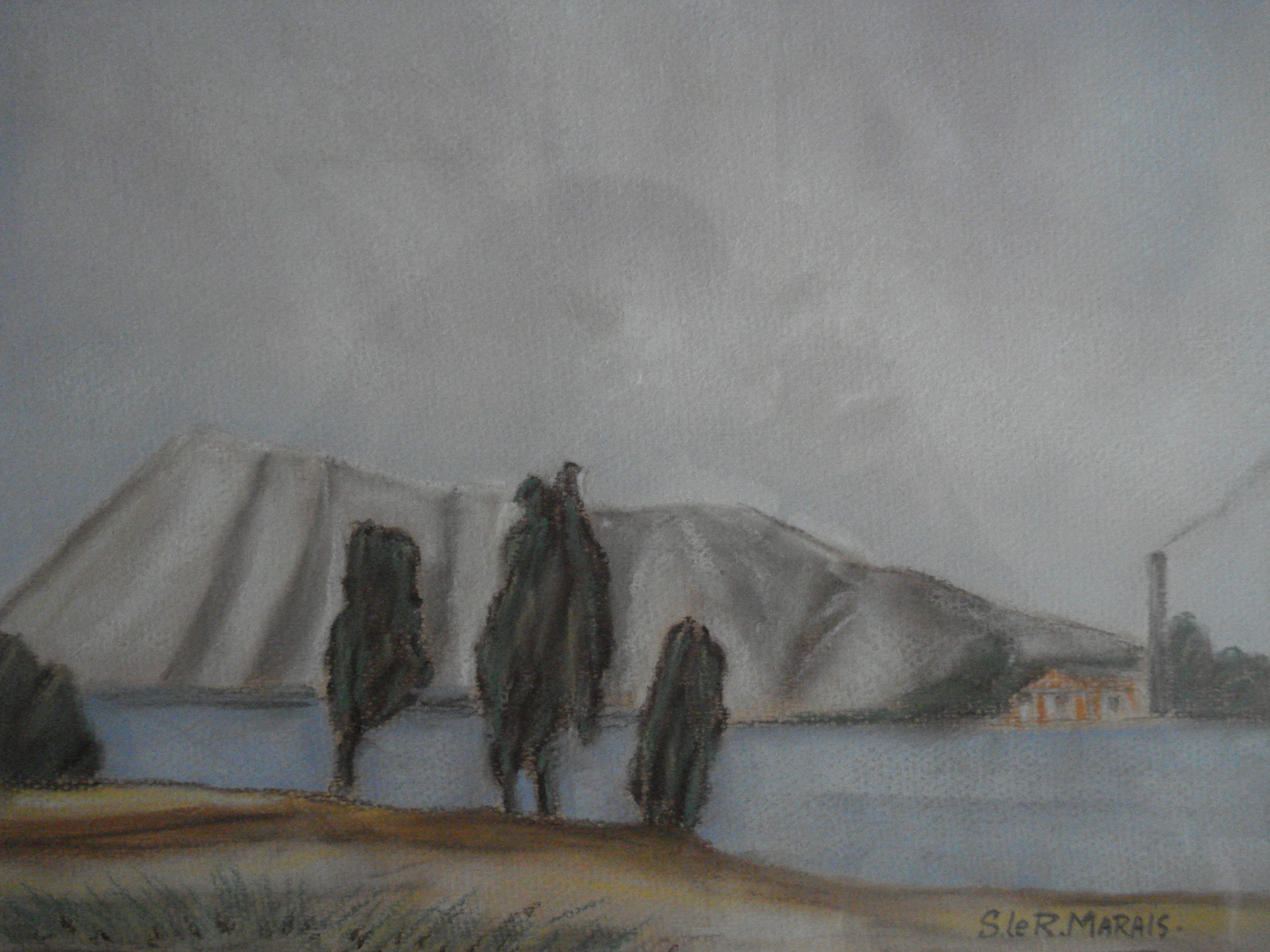
