= Mabel Jansen =

South African writer and politician (1889–1979)

Martha Mabel Jansen DMS
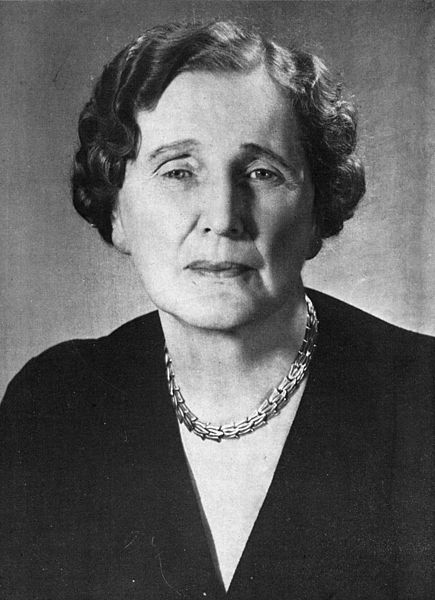
- Jansen in a photo taken around 1953.
- Born: Martha Mabel Pellissier; 1 November 1889; Bethulie, Orange Free State
- Died: 8 January 1979 (aged 89); Pretoria, Transvaal, South Africa
- Citizenship: South African citizenship
- Education: MA Greek and Latin
- Alma mater: Huguenot College
- Occupations: Educator, writer, journalist, cultural leader, politician and promoter of Afrikaans
- Spouse: E.G. Jansen (m. 1912)
- Children: Erns Louis Jansen (judge) (1918-2011)
- Relatives: Parents: Samuel Henri Pellissier and Josephine Elise Johanna Roux; Grand-daughter: Mabel Jansen, SC
- Writing career
- Language: Afrikaans
- Notable awards: Decoration for Meritorious Services; Gold Medal of the Saamwerkersunie; FAK's Public Service Honorary Award

Martha Mabel Jansen, DMS (née Pellissier; 1 November 1889 — 8 January 1979) was a South African educator, writer, journalist, cultural leader, politician and pioneer in the promotion of Afrikaans, as well as the spouse of the penultimate Governor-General of the Union of South Africa, E.G. Jansen.

She was a founding member of the Saamwerkersunie (Cooperative Union), the Voortrekkers (an Afrikaans pioneer organisation), the Vroue-Nasionale Party (Women's national party) in Natal, the Federasie van Afrikaanse Kultuurvereniginge (FAK) (Federation of Afrikaans Cultural Organisations), and the first woman member of the Suid-Afrikaanse Akademie vir Wetenskap en Kuns (South African Academy of Science and Arts).

She was the author of numerous dramas and novels, as well as the first Afrikaans grammar guide. She was involved in the founding of Voortrekkerpers (Pioneer publishers) and Die Transvaler (The Transvaler newspaper), a leading figure in the education and upliftment of impoverished Afrikaans railway workers, and an avid supporter of the preservation of cultural-historical monuments.

== Background ==
Jansen was the youngest of six children, a daughter of Samuel Henri Pellissier (1850 - 1921) and a granddaughter of Rev. Jean Pellissier, a French missionary who arrived in South Africa in 1831 and took over the London Missionary Society's mission station at Bethulie in the southern Free State on behalf of the French Missionary Society after Rev. Clark abandoned the work in July 1833 as hopeless. Her mother, Josephine Elise Johanna Roux (1857 - 1907), was a daughter of Rev. Piet Roux (1825 - 1913), the first pastor and founder of the Dutch Reformed community of Smithfield.

Jansen was educated in Bethulie and later Riversdale, Western Cape. She matriculated at Girls' School in Paarl and was placed first in the senior certificate examination in South Africa. She completed a MA in Greek and Latin at the Huguenot College in Wellington, Western Cape in 1909. The accepted work for an educated women at that time was botany or teaching, so after a year as a teacher she was appointed a lecturer at the Training College in Pietermaritzburg.

== Teacher ==
Jansen not only advocated for the Afrikaans language, but also for Afrikaans education and welfare in that she started the first on-site further education of Afrikaans railway workers in Natal. From 1924 the poor whites in the Witwatersrand area were sent to Natal to work on the railways so as to alleviate some of the social pressures in the Witwatersrand area. Jansen arranged for them to be housed in the hall of the Dutch Reformed church in Pietermaritzburg and she established one of the first railway hostels for the displaced workers, later named after her. Over the period 1924 to 1936, Jansen and a group of six teachers taught lessons to the railway workers while on the trains and arranged for a welfare worker, Henning Klopper, to visit them.

== Author ==
Jansen's first published work was the historical melodrama Afrikanerharte, written in 1914 but only published in 1918. The work was not well received by either G. Dekker in his Afrikaanse literatuurgeskiedenis (1935) or F.E.J Malherbe in his Aspekte van Afrikaanse Literatuur (1940).

Dekker commented, "That our playwrights would make an eager use of historical material was to be expected, especially when we consider that the play was a beloved propaganda tool in the language struggle. These historical dramas have also become part of the national awareness and played a role that should not be underestimated, even though the pure dramatic value of these works is generally low."

Malherbe compared her works to J.F.E. Celliers' Liefde en Plig (Love and Duty) (1909) and Heldinne van die Oorlog (Heroines of the War) (1924); and C.J. Langenhoven's Die Hoop van Suid-Afrika (The Hope of South Africa) (1913) and Die Vrou van Suid-Afrika (The South African Woman) and commented, "With the advent of the Afrikaans movement, dramas, especially those with motifs from the patriarchal history, are avidly produced. They have little literary value and are mostly propaganda; but much beloved, they have helped to raise and strengthen the consciousness of the people of the nation."

In 1919, Jansen's collection of stories Die veldblommetjie (The field flower) was published followed by similar collections Sommerso (Just so), and Erfenis (Heritage) in 1940. Under the pseudonym "Marta", Jansen published a children's play Die onnut (The useless) in 1923 and a recipe book Vrugte-heerlikheid: meer as duisend maniere om Suid-Afrikaanse vrugte voor te berei (Fruit glory: more than a thousand ways to prepare South African fruit) in 1942.

Afrikanerharte and Die veldblommetjie are of historical value but she was not recognised for her contributions to literature, but rather due to her actions in politics and Afrikaans-cultural life.

== Journalist ==
From its first edition in Bloemfontein in 1919, the Landbouweekblad (Farmer's Weekly) had a women's section managed by Jansen. It was published as a separate leaflet first known as "Housewife" and later as "The House Page" She dealt with anything the farmer's wife might be doing around the house: cooking, crafts, sewing, other household affairs and flower gardening. She had a section that responded to letters from readers and later wrote about Afrikaans language under the pseudonym "Marta".

== Politician ==
Jansen was politically active before voting rights were granted to white women in South Africa in 1930 and had been appointed provincial chairman of the National Women's Party, which she founded in 1923. In 1933 she was elected deputy leader of the National Party in Natal and served on the Federal Council. After a large part of the National Party merged with the South African Party in 1934, she assisted J.G. Strijdom and C.J.H. de Wet in the reconstruction of the National Party in the Transvaal.

The process had started at the Transvaal congress of the National Party on 9 August 1934 in Pretoria. At this meeting J.G. Strijdom voted against the merger while J. B. M. Hertzog voted in favour of it and the overwhelming majority of the delegates (281, including Jansen's husband) agreed with him while a minority (38, composed mostly of women including Jansen) were opposed to it. This small group left the meeting and set up their own meeting at the Polleys Hotel on Pretorius Street. They decided to keep the original party name (although they were referred to as the Purified National Party and from 1939 as the Reunited National Party) and decided to establish their own party newspaper, Die Vaderland (The Fatherland). Jansen's husband resigned from the United Party in 1939, and rejoined the National Party.

Jansen only stood once as a candidate for the Volksraad (literally People's Council, the Parliament of South Africa) in 1938, but lost to Abraham de Kock.

== Cultural work ==
=== Saamwerkersunie ===
Jansen did groundbreaking work in Natal from 1917 to 1929. She advocated for the introduction of Afrikaans language exams which led to the Taalbond (language board) exams from 1920. The Saamwerkersunie was established in 1917 to unite the various unions and encourage the use of Afrikaans language in examinations in the Natal province.

The Afrikaans language exams created an urgent need for an Afrikaans grammar guide, which Jansen created in collaboration with C.M. Booysen in 1917. The work was not universally well received even within the Afrikaans community. However, in July 1959 the Saamwerkersunie presented Jansen with a gold medal as a recognition of her "great cultural work".

=== Suid-Afrikaanse Akademie vir Wetenskap en Kuns ===
In 1920, Jansen became the first female member of the Suid-Afrikaanse Akademie vir Wetenskap en Kuns, and in 1969, they gave her an honorary lifelong membership.

=== Voortrekker movement ===
Flag used by the Dutch pioneers in South Africa and adopted by the Voortrekkers organisation in 1931

Jansen was closely involved in the founding of the Voortrekker movement on 30 September 1931 in the old town hall in Bloemfontein. Present at the meeting were several prominent members of the Afrikaans community including prime minister JBM Hertzog, N.J van Der Merwe (leader of the National Party in Natal), S.H. Pellissier (Jansen's cousin and leader of the Volkspelebeweging (People's games movement)), C.F. Visser (who established the precursors to the Voortrekkers) and Rachel Steyn (widow of president M.T. Steyn). Jansen was elected provincial leader of Natal and later was appointed deputy leader, a position that had to be held by a woman.

At the meeting, the first group of recruits to the Voortrekkers were recognised. Amongst them was the daughter of C.F. Visser, Marie Visser, who was presented with a Voortrekker flag that had been made by Jansen.

Jansen also served on the Voortrekker Monument Committee, of which her husband was the chair, and participated in the cornerstone laying on 16 December 1938 and the inauguration on 16 December 1949.

=== Other ===
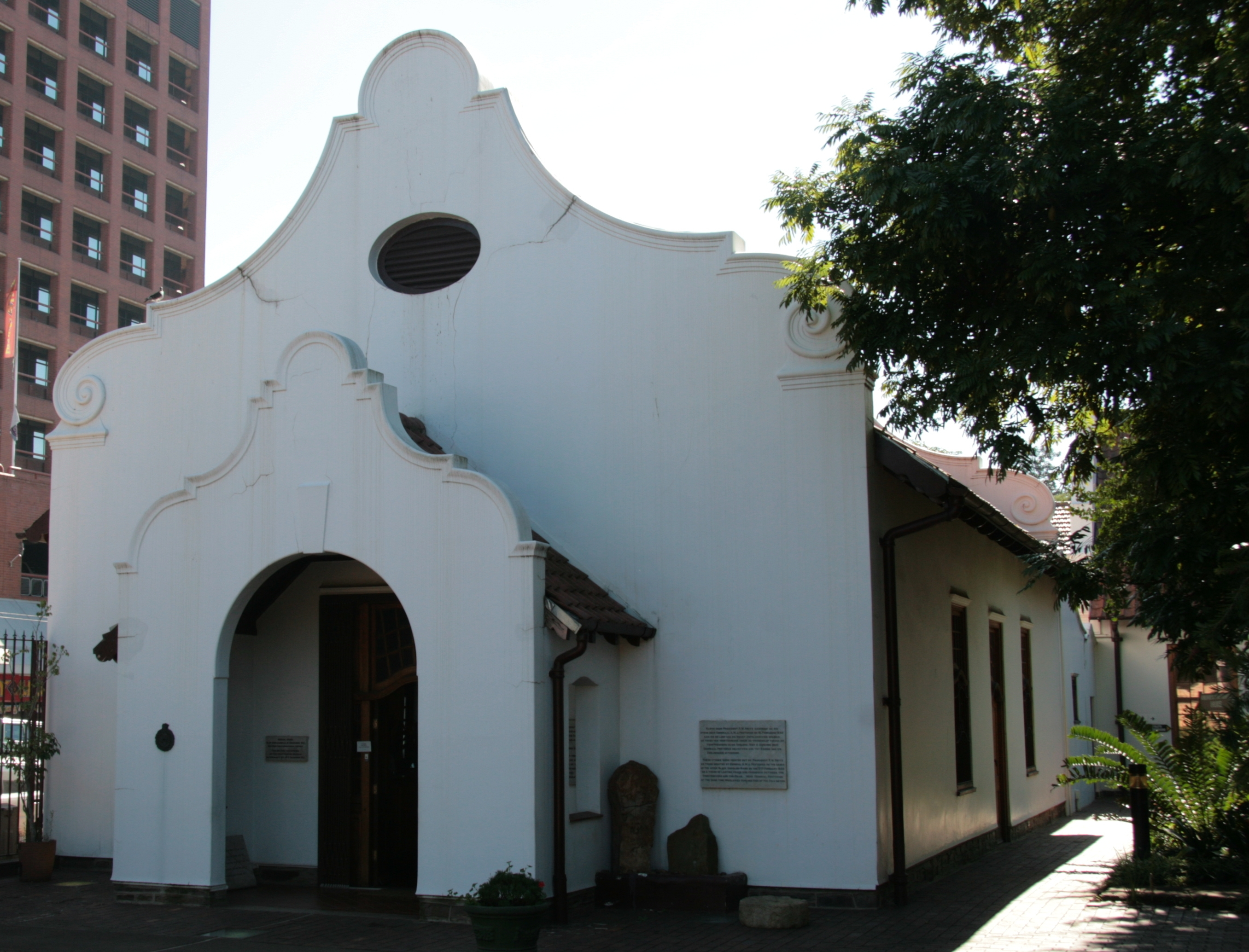
Church of the Vow, Pietermaritzburg

Jansen served on the management of the Kruger Committee, the Union Flag Committee and the Archives Committee and was also a member of the Enforcement Association. With the establishment of the Federation of Afrikaans Cultural Societies (FAK) in 1929, she became the first female member of the executive committee and retained this distinction for decades. She served as a member until 1935, and on 11 July 1974, the FAK awarded her the Public Service Honorary Award.

Both E.G. Jansen and Mabel Jansen were involved in the preservation of historic sites within Pietermartizburg, such as the Voortrekker Church of the Vow, and the erection of monuments, such as that in honour of Piet Retief, Gerrit Maritz and Piet Uys that had been funded by donations from the public and unveiled by Jansen on 6 April 1962.

== Selected works ==
Jansen published both fiction and non-fiction works including the first book on Afrikaans grammar:

- Jansen, M.M.; Booysen, C.M. (1921). Praktiese grammatika van die Afrikaanse taal: spesiaal vir gebruik in Afrikaans-medium skole tot en met matriek (in Afrikaans). De Nationale Pers.

Voortrekkerpers published her work recounting the pledge made by the pioneers before the Battle of Blood River, as recounted by Sarel Cilliers:

- Jansen, M.M.; Bon, G. (1938). Geloftelied: gelofte van Voortrekkers voor Slag van Bloedrivier (volgens bewoording van Sarel Cilliers) : gebed by die Eeufees (in Afrikaans). Voortrekkerpers.

Jansen published an historical, melodramatic play entitled Afrikaner-harte in 1918. It had six editions and was translated into English. It is amongst her most widely held work:

- Jansen, M.M. Afrikaner-harte: drama in drie bedrywe (in Afrikaans). Voortrekkerpers Bpk.

== Personal life ==
Jansen was secretary of the Christian Women's Association of Natal, a Sunday School teacher and a church organist. In 1912 she married Advocate E.G. Jansen, who had started practicing as a lawyer in Pietermaritzburg in 1906. Her husband had already played a leading role in the promotion of Afrikaans language and culture in the predominantly English-speaking Natal. He was prominent in the cultural-historical life of this province and served on the board of the Debats- en Letterkundige Vereniging (Pietermaritzburg Debate and Literary Society), which he founded in 1908, and also of the Voortrekker Museum Committee.

Jansen was involved in a car accident in the 1930s from which she never fully recovered, although it had no effect on her mentally. E.G. Jansen died in 1959, and from that point on Mabel Jansen lived alone in her home in Irene with her dog, Referendum. The Jansens only had one child, Erns Louis Jansen, who became a Transvaal judge and later appellate judge and died in Pretoria on 23 May 2011. One of his three daughters, Mabel Jansen, SC, followed in her grandfather and father's legal footsteps and chaired the Pretoria Bar Council from 2003 to 2004. The other two daughters are Erna Heyns and Christine Loubser. At the time of his death, there were seven grandchildren.

On her 86th birthday celebration in 1975, the prime minister, John Vorster, paid tribute to her and in 1976 she was honoured by State President N.J. Diederichs with the Decoration for Meritorious Services.

Jansen's epitaph in the cemetery in Centurion, Gauteng reads, in Afrikaans:"Gelowend in God het sy haar volk met eer gedien." (in English: "Believing in God, she served her people with honour.")

She remained steadfastly true to her principles throughout her life, to the extent that when her husband followed JBM Hertzog from the National Party to the United Party in 1933, she remained a Nationalist and helped build the party up after the merger. On the eve of World War II, E.G. Jansen returned to the party his wife had been faithful to all the time.
