= Ernest George Jansen =

South African politician (1881–1959)

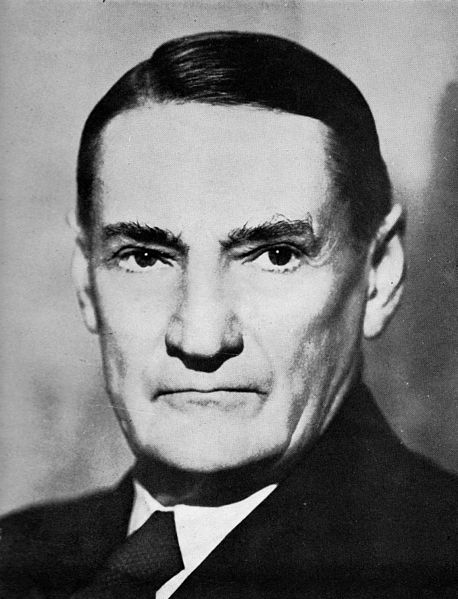

8th Governor-General of South Africa
- In office 1 January 1951 – 25 November 1959
- Monarchs: George VI; Elizabeth II
- Prime Minister: D. F. Malan; Johannes Strijdom; Hendrik Verwoerd
- Preceded by: Gideon Brand van Zyl
- Succeeded by: Lucas Cornelius Steyn (acting); Charles Robberts Swart

Personal details
- Born: 7 August 1881 Dundee, Colony of Natal
- Died: 25 November 1959 (aged 78) Pretoria, Transvaal, South Africa
- Resting place: Heroes' Acre, Pretoria, Gauteng, South Africa
- Other political affiliations: Nasionale Party

Ernest George Jansen (7 August 1881 – 25 November 1959) was the penultimate Governor-General of the Union of South Africa, holding office from 1951 until his death in 1959.

== Early life and education ==
Born on 7 August 1881, he was educated at the Durban High School and then graduated with a law degree from the University of the Cape of Good Hope in 1905, and was admitted as an advocate (the South African equivalent of a barrister) in 1913.

== Political career ==
An ardent champion of Afrikaner interests, he joined the National Party in 1915 and was a member of Parliament from 1915 to 1920, from 1921 to 1943, and from 1947 to 1950.

In 1919, he was a member of a delegation which tried unsuccessfully to persuade American president Woodrow Wilson to call for independence to be restored to the former Boer republics of the Orange Free State and the Transvaal.

In Parliament, Jansen was Speaker of the House of Assembly of South Africa from 1924 to 1929, Minister of Native Affairs and of Irrigation from 1929 to 1934, and Speaker again from 1934 to 1943. He was highly regarded for his firm and impartial speakership.

He was Minister of Native Affairs again from 1948 to 1950, but was thought to be too soft on the new policy of apartheid, for which his department was primarily responsible. He was subsequently replaced by hardliner Hendrik Verwoerd and formally promoted by Prime Minister Daniel Malan to the politically neutral post of Governor-General once vacant. As an Afrikaner nationalist and stout republican, Jansen declined to wear the ceremonial uniform, or to take the oath of allegiance to the monarch whom he represented. He held office until his death in 1959, when he was succeeded by Minister of Justice Charles Robberts Swart.

== Personal life and legacy ==
Jansen married Martha Mabel Pellissier in 1912. Both were prominent figures in Afrikaner cultural circles. Jansen was a founder member of the South African Academy for Science and Art (Suid-Afrikaanse Akademie vir Wetenskap en Kuns - SAAWEK) in 1909, of the Co-operation Union (Saamwerk-Unie) in 1917, of the Federation of Afrikaner Cultural Associations (Federasie van Afrikaanse Kultuurvereniginge - FAK) in 1929, and of the Voortrekkers (the Afrikaner equivalent of the Boy Scouts and Girl Guides) in 1930, and was master of ceremonies at the laying of the foundation stone of the Voortrekker Monument in 1938 and at its dedication in 1949.

Hoërskool Dr. E.G. Jansen (High School), in Boksburg, is named after him.

== See also ==
- Afrikaner
- Afrikaner Calvinism
- Afrikaner nationalism

Political offices
Preceded by Gideon Brand van Zyl	Governor-General of the Union of South Africa; 1951–1959	Succeeded by Lucas Cornelius Steyn
