= Stellenbosch University Conservatorium and Music Department =

Coordinates: 33.9344°S 18.8662°E

Stellenbosch University Conservatory
- Konservatorium van die Universiteit Stellenbosch
- Established: 1905
- Parent institution: Stellenbosch University
- Location: Stellenbosch, Western Cape, South Africa

The Stellenbosch University Conservatory is the music department of Stellenbosch University, based in Stellenbosch, South Africa. Founded in 1905, it is the oldest institution for tertiary music education in the country.

== History ==
The Stellenbosch University Conservatorium, originally founded in 1905 as the South African Conservatorium of Music, claims to be the oldest institution for tertiary music education in South Africa. It was established by five private music teachers: F.W. Jannasch, Hans Endler, Armin Schniter, Nancy de Villiers, and Elisabeth von Willich. The Conservatorium was incorporated into Stellenbosch University as a department of the Faculty of Arts and Humanities in 1934.

== Development and growth ==
The Conservatorium's incorporation into Stellenbosch University in 1934 aligned with broader efforts to institutionalise Afrikaans culture and identity, often associated with the Third Language Movement (Afrikaans: Derde Taalbeweging). In 1944, formal degree courses were introduced, leading to a significant increase in student numbers. By 1957, the growing demand necessitated the expansion of facilities, resulting in the acquisition of neighbouring buildings. In 1978, the current Conservatorium building, including the Endler Hall, was inaugurated.

Following the appointment of Dutch music historian Jan Bouws in 1960 as Professor of Music History and Palaeography, the Conservatorium saw a notable expansion in academic research. Bouws was instrumental in advancing music historiography - especially Afrikaans - and fostering a research culture within the department. His writings documented South African and especially Afrikaans musical history, often framing it within nationalist narratives. His extensive publishing in both academic and popular formats helped establish a distinctly Afrikaans scholarly discourse on music.

== Endler Hall ==
The Endler Hall, named after one of the founding figures Hans Endler, is the main concert venue within the Conservatorium. Designed by architect Gilbert Colyn and featuring acoustic engineering by W. Keet, the hall was opened in 1978. It has since served as a key cultural space, hosting performances by local and international artists. The hall was originally conceived to promote Western classical music but has expanded its programming over time to include jazz, contemporary, and African music performances.

== Academic programs ==
The Music Department offers undergraduate and postgraduate degrees and certificates in music performance, music education, musicology, and composition. The curriculum is rooted in Western classical traditions but has been adapted over the years to include African and popular music studies.

== Apartheid and transformation ==
Stellenbosch University's alignment with Afrikaner nationalism would long shape the ideological orientation of the department and its intellectual traditions. During apartheid, the department operated within a Eurocentric intellectual and aesthetic framework, contributing to the development of a white Western musical culture. The Music Department, like Stellenbosch University as a whole, was largely racially exclusive. Racial segregation was enforced in admissions and concert attendance. The first "coloured" student, Peter Abels, was admitted by special permission in 1978, and broader racial integration only began in 1984.

In his review of Izak Grové's centenary book on the Conservatorium, Chris Walton highlights the institution's lack of critical engagement with its past, particularly its role in upholding apartheid-era exclusivity and Afrikaner cultural nationalism. Walton argues that the book largely serves as a self-congratulatory history, omitting any in-depth reckoning with the exclusionary practices that defined the department for much of the 20th century. He also points to the limited representation of black musicians in the institution's historical narrative and questions the extent to which meaningful transformation has occurred in recent decades.

== Important initiatives ==
The Stellenbosch University Music Department has been involved in several initiatives aimed at promoting music education and performance. One of the most notable is the Stellenbosch International Chamber Music Festival (SICMF), founded in 2004. The festival brings together students and professional musicians from around the world for masterclasses, workshops, and performances, fostering cross-cultural engagement and musical excellence.

== Notable alumni and faculty ==
Several notable musicians have been associated with the Stellenbosch Conservatorium, including:

- Arnold van Wyk – composer
- Hubert du Plessis – composer
- Hendrik Hofmeyr – composer
- Manuel Escorcio – tenor
- Deon van der Walt – operatic tenor

== See also ==
- Stellenbosch University
- South African College of Music
- Western classical music
- Afrikaner nationalism
