= Bloemfontein Teachers' Training College =

Former teacher's college in Bloemfontein, South Africa

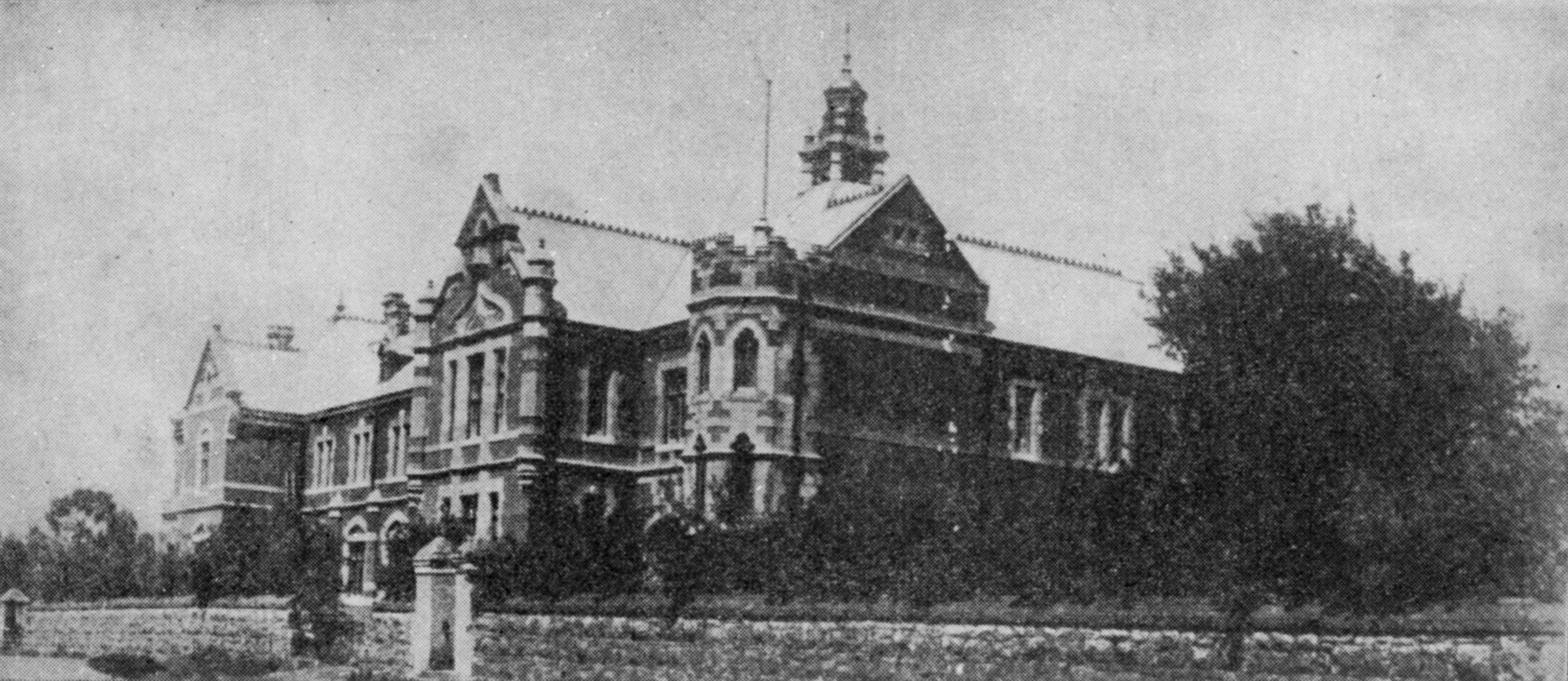
The Bloemfontein Normal School in 1907.

The Bloemfontein Teachers' Training College was one of several names and forms taken over a century by a training institution for teachers in Bloemfontein, the capital of Free State, South Africa.

The Normaalskool opened on October 12, 1898, on the recommendation of Dr. John Brebner of the Free State Volksraad, with P.J. du Pré le Roux as its first president. After the Second Boer War, the school was reopened as the Normal School with Mr. E.M. Firks as president. In 1912, the college was renamed the Normal and Polytechnic College, but when the new offices were opened on February 8, 1916, the word Polytechnic was dropped from the name.

The Afrikaans language was taught as a course from 1919 onward, and became the medium of instruction under the directorship of Dr. C.F. Visser (1929-1942). On December 6, 1944, the Normal College became the Department of Education of the University of the Free State (UFS), and in 1951, it was renamed the UFS Edudcation College. It was detached from the UFS on June 16, 1965, and renamed the Bloemfontein Teachers' Training College.

== Sources ==
- (af) Swart, Dr. M.J. (chairman, editing committee). 1980. Afrikaanse kultuuralmanak. Auckland Park: Federasie van Afrikaanse Kultuurvereniginge.
