= Pyott =

Pyott is a surname. Notable people with the surname include:

- David E. I. Pyott (born 1953), American businessman
- John Pyott (1863–1947), Scottish-born South African baker and industrialist
- Keith Pyott (1902–1968), British actor

== See also ==
- Pott (surname)
