= John Pyott =

South African baker and industrialist

- Born: May 3, 1863; Dundee, Scotland, United Kingdom
- Died: July 24, 1947 (aged 84); Port Elizabeth, Cape Province, South Africa
- Occupation(s): Baker, industrialist, local politician
- Known for: Founder of the Pyott baked goods company
- Spouse: Annie Mahaffey (m. 1884)
- Children: 8

John Pyott (May 3, 1863, Dundee, Scotland – July 24, 1947, Port Elizabeth, Cape Province) was a South African baker and industrialist.

== Early life in Scotland ==
Pyott was the son of George and Margaret Pyott. He completed elementary school in his hometown and began working in his teens for the miller and bakery Lindsay & Law in Dundee. Before he emigrated to South Africa in 1882, he had already become the manager at one of the firm's branches at the age of twenty.

== South Africa ==
Pyott settled in Port Elizabeth, where he founded a small mill, and three years later, he offered his first commercial product, pastries. They were joined in 1887 by biscuits and in the following years by jam. In 1900, the business went public as a limited liability company, of which he was the managing director.

In the 1900s, Pyott's pastry and baking firm expanded to Woodstock, Cape Town, and in 1906 to Johannesburg, from which he fed the Witwatersrand and Transvaal. He also opened a store and factory in Durban, and despite fierce competition from local factories, his business was successful and won seventy awards from South African agricultural shows and other contests over its first twenty years in existence.

== Politics ==
Pyott was elected in 1903 to the Parliament of the Cape of Good Hope and represented the Eastern Circle constituency in the Union of South Africa from 1910 onward. In May 1904, he was appointed to a select committee of Parliament to report on the state of industry in Cape Colony. The Colony's eventual customs and tariffs system was largely based on his report. Pyott was in favor of the Southern African Customs Union to open markets for Cape products and advocated for butter subsidies as a benefit for local farmers.

== Personal life ==
Pyott served for a number of years on the Port Elizabeth City Council, was an influential leader of the local Chamber of Commerce, a founding member of the Chamber of Industries in Port Elizabeth, and was a director of the South African Reserve Bank before his death in 1946. He was also a member of the Public Service Club in Cape Town and Port Elizabeth. Pyott bowled for recreation and won a trophy in the championships of the Tenpin Bowling Association of South Africa.

The Pyott business was founded in 1885, and remains one of the leading baked goods brands in the country, now owned by AVI. He married Annie Mahaffey in 1884, and they had four sons and four daughters.

== See also ==
- Bakers (bakery)
- AVI Limited

== Sources ==
- Leverton, B.J.T. and Beyers, C.J., ed. Suid-Afrikaanse Biografiese Woordeboek (Hardcover). Pretoria: Chris van Rensburg nms. die RGN. p. 962. ISBN 0796904197.
