= Scouting and Guiding in South Africa =

Scouting and Guiding associations in South Africa

The Scout and Guide movement in South Africa consists of two independent national organizations:

- Girl Guides South Africa
- Scouts South Africa

== See also ==
- Voortrekkers
