= Jacques Philip Malan =

South African musicologist (1917-2012)

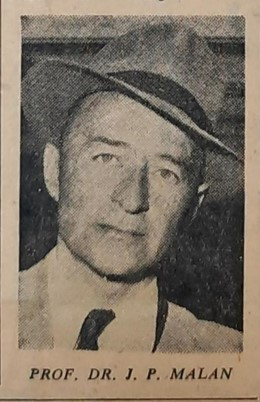
- Born: 24 October 1917; Bloemfontein, South Africa
- Died: 20 June 2012 (aged 94); Hartbeespoort, South Africa
- Occupation: Musicologist
- Known for: Editor of South African Music Encyclopedia

Jacques Philip Malan (24 October 1917 - 20 June 2012) was a South African musicologist who held several prominent positions in South African music throughout his career. He was also the editor of the South African Music Encyclopedia, published in four volumes by Oxford University Press between 1979 and 1986.

== Early life and education ==
Jacques Philip Malan was born on 24 October 1917 in Bloemfontein. He undertook his early musical training at the Free State Music School. In 1940, he received his teaching and performer's licentiates from the University of South Africa, and in 1943 a BA degree from Grey University College (later the University of the Orange Free State, and now the University of the Free State). Malan was the first South African to undertake musicological studies overseas, completing his doctoral studies at the University of Vienna with a thesis on the content and form of the motifs in Handel's oratorios under the supervision of Erich Schenk in 1954.

== Career and contributions ==
Malan was responsible for the establishment of a music department at Potchefstroom University College for Christian Higher Education (which became the Potchefstroom University for Christian Higher Education (PU for CHE) in 1951 and is now known as the North-West University) in the 1940s. In 1960, he was appointed as the head of the music department at the University of Pretoria. Under his guidance, the department's research had a strong focus on South African and particularly Afrikaans topics. During his time at the University of Pretoria, he also compiled and edited the South African Music Encyclopedia, a process which lasted from 1960 to 1986. In 1978, Malan left the University of Pretoria to join the Human Sciences Research Council as the head of its Research Centre for South African Music.

== Research and publications ==
In the early stages of his career, Malan concentrated on Afrikaner church music, as evidenced by his publications from 1961 to 1964. Over time, his focus shifted towards the organization and reform of South African music education and research, reflecting a growing emphasis on the intellectual life of universities. This shift is evident in his inaugural professorial address, where Malan described the university as a crucial element in shaping and reflecting the consciousness of the "volk". He argued that a civilized society depends on the university's role as a research center, training hub, and cultural focal point, contributing to a vibrant intellectual life.

== Criticism and legacy ==
In her master's thesis, Carina Venter identifies Malan as a scholar whose discourse is marked by nationalism and Christianism. She argues that Malan's critique of Afrikaans church music echoes the racially charged ideologies of Apartheid, particularly through themes of Afrikaner unity and segregation. Venter also identifies themes of national goals, integration, order, and racial segregation in Malan's other work, noting that his stance on ethnomusicology was aligned with apartheid's ideals of separate development.

Malan has been critiqued by scholars such as Christine Lucia, who describes him as a "political activist waiting to exploit 'the possibilities of a new kind of (white) critical inscription'", placing his scholarship within the "discursive realm of political activism".

However, in her PhD dissertation, Mieke Struwig argues for a more nuanced perspective of Malan. Struwig argues that Malan recognized the importance of indigenous music for developing an authentic South African compositional style and was aware that white appropriation of Black music would be problematic. She also highlights that Malan opposed the politicization of music studies, though this stance itself could be seen as political. While Struwig acknowledges that Malan was not "an apartheid ideologue", she points out that his scholarly activities were complicit in the intellectual project of apartheid.

== Publications ==
- Malan, J.P. (1950) 'In Memoriam: Johann Sebastian Bach (1685–1750)', Koers – Bulletin for Christian Scholarship, 18(1), 13–17.
- Malan, J.P. (1959a) 'Die Lewens- en Wêreldbeskouing van Johann Sebastian Bach: I', Standpunte, XII(5), 4–11.
- Malan, J.P. (1959b) 'Die Lewens- en Wêreldbeskouing van Johann Sebastian Bach: II', Standpunte, XII(6), 8–19.
- Malan, J.P. (1961a) 'Die Afrikaner en sy Kerkmusiek', Standpunte, XIV(3), 22–34.
- Malan, J.P. (1961b) 'Die Afrikaner en sy Kerkmusiek – 2', Standpunte, XIV(4), 31–41.
- Malan, J.P. (1961c) 'Die Afrikaner en sy Kerkmusiek – 3', Standpunte, XIV(5), 41–49.
- Malan, J.P. (1962) 'Die Afrikaner en sy Kerkmusiek – slot', Standpunte, XV(2–3), 19–37.
- Malan, J.P. (1964) 'Ons Kerkmusiek', Standpunte, XVII(4), 59–63.
- Malan, J.P. (1967) Universiteit en Musiek. Pretoria: University of Pretoria.
- Malan, J.P. (1970) 'Die pad vorentoe in die musiekonderwys', The South African Music Teacher, 79, 8–10.
- Malan, J.P. (ed.) (1973) Musiekwoordeboek/Dictionary of Music. Cape Town: Tafelberg.
- Malan, J.P. (1979) Die Musiekskole in Duitsland en die Toepassing van die Idee in Suid-Afrika. Pretoria: HSRC.
- Malan, J.P. (1980) 'Besinning oor die SAME in die Suid-Afrikaanse Musieklewe', Ars Nova, 12, 5–10.
- Malan, J.P. (1981) 'n Bydrae tot 'n voorgestelde nasionale kunsbeleid', South African Journal of Musicology, 1, 30–44.
- Malan, J.P. (1983) 'Suid-Afrikaanse Musiekwetenskap: 'n Uitdaging en 'n Verantwoordelikheid', South African Journal of Musicology (SAMUS), 3, 27–34.
- Malan, J.P. (1986) 'Bach en kommunikasie – 'n verlustiging met die mensekind', Communicatio: South African Journal for Communication Theory and Research, 12(1), 3–12.
- Malan, J.P. (2000) 'Die PU-Konservatorium as liggaam: Enkele aantekeninge oor sy wording', Koers-Bulletin for Christian Scholarship, 65(2), 261–267.
- Malan, J.P. (2007) 'n Nuwe Lied', Die Kerkblad, 110(3206), 28–31.

== Bibliography ==
- Lucia, C. (ed.) (2005) The World of South African Music: A Reader. Newcastle-upon-Tyne: Cambridge Scholars Press.
- Malan, J.P. (ed.) (1984) The South African Music Encyclopedia: Volume III. Cape Town: Oxford University Press.
- Malan, J.P. (ed.) (1986) The South African Music Encyclopedia: Volume IV. Cape Town: Oxford University Press.
- Muller, S. (2007) 'Review of The World of South African Music: A Reader by Lucia, C. (ed.)'. Fontes Artis Musicae, 54(3), 374–379.
- Struwig, M. (2024) An Intellectual History of Institutionalised Music Studies in South Africa. PhD Dissertation. Stellenbosch University. https://scholar.sun.ac.za/handle/10019.1/130248.
- Venter, C. (2009) The Influence of Early Apartheid Intellectualisation on Twentieth-Century Afrikaans Music Historiography. Master's thesis. Stellenbosch University. http://hdl.handle.net/10019.1/2839.
