= Percival Kirby =

Percival Robson Kirby
- Born: 17 April 1887; Aberdeen, Scotland
- Died: 8 February 1970 (aged 82); Makhanda (formerly Grahamstown), South Africa
- Occupations: Ethnomusicologist, Musicologist, Historian, Professor
- Known for: Study and preservation of southern African indigenous music
- Notable work: The Musical Instruments of the Native Races of South Africa (1934)

Percival Robson Kirby (17 April 1887 – 8 February 1970) was a Scottish-born South African ethnomusicologist, musicologist, historian, and professor. He is best known for his work on the study and preservation of southern African indigenous music, particularly his pioneering text The Musical Instruments of the Native Races of South Africa (1934). Kirby played a significant role in documenting and preserving African musical traditions during his tenure as Professor of Music at the University of the Witwatersrand.

== Early life and education ==
Kirby was born in Aberdeen, Scotland, where he developed an early interest in music. He played the flute and timpani with local orchestras during his youth. Kirby was educated at the Church of Scotland Normal College, Aberdeen, where he trained as a schoolteacher, and later at the University of Aberdeen, from which he graduated with a Master of Arts degree in 1910.

In 1910, Kirby received a scholarship to study at the Royal College of Music in London. There, he studied under Daniel S. Wood (flute), Herbert Sharpe (piano), Charles Wood (counterpoint and harmony), and Charles Villiers Stanford (composition). Kirby was awarded the Diploma of Associate of the Royal College of Music in 1913 for composition.

== Career in South Africa ==
In early 1914, Kirby relocated to South Africa after being appointed as the Music Organiser for the Natal Education Department. This role marked the beginning of his influential career in South Africa. After seven years with the Natal Education Department, Kirby was appointed as the Chair of the Music Department at the University College, Johannesburg, in 1921. This institution would later become the University of the Witwatersrand.

Kirby was the first person to hold the position of Professor of Music at the University of the Witwatersrand, where he served for thirty-one years until his retirement in 1952. During his tenure, he played a pivotal role in developing the music department and expanding the scope of music education in South Africa. Kirby published extensively throughout his life and in various fields. Kirby's legacy as a lecturer was far-reaching in South African music studies, with notable students including Anton Hartman, Rosa Nepgen, and Yvonne Huskisson. Mieke Struwig has discussed Kirby's influential impact as a scholar and supervisor of many music students at the University of the Witwatersrand.

Kirby was awarded the degree D.Litt. in 1931 on the merits of a thesis entitled "Literary Contributions to the Study of Music" and was made a Fellow of the Royal College of Music (1924) and the Royal Anthropological Institute of Great Britain and Ireland (1936). Rhodes University conferred upon Kirby the honorary degree of Doctor of Literature in 1965.

== Ethnomusicological work ==
Kirby's ethnomusicological research, particularly his work on African musical instruments, remains a cornerstone in the field. His most famous publication, The Musical Instruments of the Native Races of South Africa (1934), is regarded as one of the first comprehensive studies of African musicology. Kirby's research involved extensive fieldwork throughout southern Africa, where he collected and documented various indigenous musical instruments. The text has been republished several times, with the most recent edition, Musical Instruments of the Indigenous People of South Africa, released in 2013.

Despite its impact, Kirby's ethnomusicological work has been critiqued. Scholars like Veit Erlmann and Grant Olwage have pointed out that Kirby's devotion to—in Olwage's words—"tribe and tradition" created what W.D. Hammond-Tooke described as "static and nostalgic images" of indigenous cultures. As noted by Olwage, David Coplan, and Struwig, there are also problematic evolutionary attitudes in Kirby's work, depicting non-Western musics as essentialist, historical precursors to Western Music. Nevertheless, scholars like Coplan and Kofi Agawu have praised his work for its thoroughness and its lasting importance in the study of the organology of southern African indigenous music.

== Musicological work ==
Kirby's first monograph, entitled The Kettledrums: A Book for Composers, Conductors and Kettledrummers, was published in 1930. Despite his enduring legacy in ethnomusicology, this book and several publications on musical theatre and western art music illustrate the diversity of his musical work, covering topics such as acoustics, music analysis, music history, and organology. In 1938, Kirby published an article entitled "Saint Cecilia Goes South: A Contribution to the History of Music in South Africa", which serves as a brief overview of the history of Western music in South Africa and highlights how Western music has been adopted within indigenous communities, linking his work and views in musicology, history, and ethnomusicology into one text.

== Composer ==
Kirby's entry in the South African Music Encyclopedia (vol. 3, 1984), includes a long list of compositions, most existing only in manuscript form. Only two of his compositions—Three African Idylls, for soprano solo with piano accompaniment (Johannesburg: Witwatersrand University Press, 1939/1940), and O mistress mine, for unaccompanied mixed chorus, text by William Shakespeare (London: J. Curwen & Sons, 1961)—are listed as published.

== Historical work ==
Kirby's work was not limited to music. As an historian, he published extensively, especially after his retirement as Professor of Music at the University of the Witwatersrand in 1952. Kirby was involved with the South African Museums' Association and was made president of the association several times. His historical works include texts on local history and European exploration. Jonathan Hughes has disputed the accuracy of an article published by Kirby on a historic William Hill chamber organ at Wesley Methodist Church, Makhanda. Given that the instrument is currently the oldest playable pipe organ in South Africa, the article has been widely cited, despite several inaccurate claims made by Kirby without evidence.

== Legacy ==
Percival Robson Kirby's contributions to musicology and ethnomusicology have had a lasting impact on the study of African music. His large collection of more than six hundred musical instruments—many pre-dating 1934—is currently held by the South African College of Music, University of Cape Town. Kirby's work has been instrumental in preserving the rich musical heritage of southern Africa and continues to influence the field of ethnomusicology.

Following his retirement, Kirby settled in erstwhile Grahamstown, where he lived until his death on 8 February 1970. His legacy is measured through his influential publications, his collection of African musical instruments, and his role in advancing the study of indigenous music in South Africa.

== Selected publications ==
- Kirby, Percival R. 1934. The Musical Instruments of the Native Races of South Africa. Oxford: Oxford University Press.
- Kirby, Percival R. 1934. "The Effect of Western Civilization on Bantu Music", in Schapera, I. (ed.) Western Civilization and the Natives of South Africa: Studies in Culture Contact. London: Routledge, 131–140.
- Kirby, Percival R. 1938. "Saint Cecilia Goes South: A Contribution to the History of Music in South Africa." Proceedings of the Musical Association 64 (1): 25–38.
- Kirby, Percival R. 1949. "The Hottentot Venus", Africana Notes and News, 6(3): 55–62.
- Kirby, Percival R. 1952. "La Vénus Hottentote en Angleterre", Aesculape 33(new series)(1): 14–21. 207
- Kirby, Percival R. 1953. "More about the Hottentot Venus, Africana Notes and News, 10(4): 124–34.
- Kirby, Percival R. 1953. "A Sourcebook on the Wreck of the Grosvenor East Indiaman". Cape Town: The Van Riebeeck Society.
- Kirby, Percival R. 1958. "An Early Organ by William Hill." The Organ 150: 87–91.
- Kirby, Percival R. 1967. Wits End. Cape Town: Howard Timmins.
