= Joshua Pulumo Mohapeloa =

Mosotho choral composer (1908–1982)

Joshua Pulumo Mohapeloa OBE
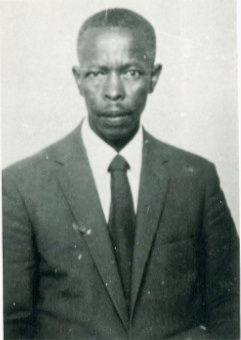
- Joshua Pulumo Mohapeloa, ca. 1930s

Background information
- Born: 28 March 1908; Molumong, Lesotho
- Died: 12 January 1982 (aged 73) Maseru, Lesotho
- Genre: Choral

Joshua Pulumo Mohapeloa (March 28, 1908 – January 12, 1982) was a prominent choral music composer in Sesotho.

== Early life ==
Joshua Mohapeloa, a member of the Bataung clan, was born in Molumong in Lesotho, Southern Africa. Joshua Mohapeloa's family converted to Christianity in the 19th century. Both his grandfather Joel Mohapeloa and his father Joel Mohapeloane Mohapeloa were reverends, and it is evident from his works that Christianity influenced Joshua Mohapeloa. After completing his elementary schooling, Joshua Mohapeloa enrolled at the PEMS (Paris Evangelical Missionary Society) mission institution Morija Training College from 1923 to 1927. It was at Morija Training College that he studied music and music education, completing his Junior Certificate in 1927.

== Education ==
In 1928 Joshua Mohapeloa enrolled at Fort Hare College, and in 1929 completed his teacher training. Joshua Mohapeloa also enrolled at the University of the Witwatersrand and became a student of Percival Kirby.

== Musical influence ==
From the early 1930s to 1937, Joshua Mohapeloa was active as the choirmaster of the then Morija Choristers. A number of Mohapeloa's own works began to be performed by the Choristers during this time. In 1935 his first collection of compositions, titled "Meloli le Lithalerre tsa Afrika", was published by the Morija Printing Press and Book Depot. Joshua Mohapeloa is renowned for composing musical works that blended SeSotho themes with Western styles. Joshua Mohapeloa's ambition was at times stifled as is evident in correspondence between T. Mashologu, Counsellor in the office of Lesotho’s High Commission in London, and Hugh Tracey; and in the words of Bonisile Gcisa (an author and expert on the African choral music) at a commemoration event in honor of Johsua Mohapeloa in 2015, where Gcisa stated that Joshua Mohapeloa faced a number of challenges, including attempts by the missionaries to suppress his talent.

== Awards ==
Joshua Mohapeloa was appointed an Officer of the Order of the British Empire (OBE) by the British Government in the 1961 Birthday Honours., or 1964 according to Huskisson. In 1974 he was awarded the Knight Commander of Ramts'eatsane by Lesotho. He is furthermore known as Poet Laureate of Kingdom of Lesotho. The National University of Lesotho conferred on him an honorary doctorate, Honorary D.Litt., in 1978.

== Publications ==
- "Coronation song" in 1937. Originally this work celebrated the coronation of King George VI of the United Kingdom. Through adaptations and reprints in 1945, 1955, 1966 and 1980, with the mid-1970 version transforming into ‘Lesotho Lefa la Rōna’ (Lesotho Our Heritage)
- Meloli le Lithallere tsa Afrika I [African Songs and Extemporary Harmonizations book 1]. Foreword by Akim. L. Sello, Preface by J.P. Mohapeloa. Morija, Lesotho: Morija Sesuto Book Depot. 1935; 1953; 1977; 1983; 1988. [32 songs]
- Meloli le Lithallere tsa Afrika II. Morija, Lesotho: Morija Sesuto Book Depot. 1939; 1945; 1955; 1980; 1996. [32 songs]
- Meloli le Lithallere tsa Afrika III. Morija, Lesotho: Morija Sesuto Book Depot. 1947; 1966; 1977; 1983; 1988. [28 songs]
- Khalima-Nosi tsa ’Mino Oa Kajeno [Shining Examples of Today’s Music]: Harnessing Salient Features of Modern African Music. Preface by J.P. Mohapeloa. Morija: Morija Sesuto Book Depot. 1951; 2002. [5 songs]
- Christmas, Balisa, Hosanna, O, phokolang, Molimo ke moea, Silevera le gauda, Ahe, Moren’a Khanya! and Na le ’na? in Hosanna: Lipina tsa Kereke [Hosanna: Church Songs], Morija: Morija Sesuto Book Depot. 1955 [two printings]. [songs 1, 2, 4, 10, 19, 20, 22, 24]
- Lifela tsa Sione [Songs of Zion], Morija: Morija Sesuto Book Depot, 1st ed. 1844; reprinted many times, last reprint 2010. [Hymn 445 (= Hosanna 19)]
- Butha-Buthe, Leheshe-heshe, Lehlomela la Thesele le letle-letle, Leribe, Maloti a Lesotho, and Quthing, in Binang ka Thabo [Sing with Joy] Mazenod: Mazenod Institute, 1963
- Meluluetsa ea Ntšetso-pele le Bosechaba Lesotho [Anthems for the Development of the Lesotho Nation]. Foreword by Dibarata Ghosh. Preface by J.P. Mohapeloa. Cape Town: Oxford University Press. 1976. [25 songs]
- Mohapeloa, J.P. 1976. ‘Selelekela’ [Preface]. In Meluluetsa ea Ntšetso-pele le Bosechaba Lesotho, J.P. Mohapeloa, 13-14. Cape Town: Oxford University Press.
