= South African Music Encyclopedia =

Four volume book by Jacques Philip Malan

The South African Music Encyclopedia (Suid-Afrikaanse Musiekensiklopedie, or SAME) is an encyclopedia of South(ern) African musicians and music. Its four volumes were published in 1979, 1982, 1984, and 1986 under the editorship of Afrikaans music scholar Jacques Philip Malan in both English and Afrikaans. Commissioned by the South African Music Council in 1960, the work was ultimately overseen by the Human Sciences Research Council and published by Oxford University Press.

== Genesis ==
In the 1950s, the South African Music Council, an organisatory body established in 1951 (and disbanded in 1962) which aimed to oversee, manage and regulate formal musical activities in South Africa, came to believe that an "incomplete, inadequate picture of musical life... existed in South Africa". Funding for the compilation of an encyclopedia on South African music was subsequently requested from the Department of Education, Arts, and Science in 1960. Soon thereafter, Jacques Philip Malan accepted the position of editor.

== Compilation ==
Planning and work initially took place under the auspices of the National Bureau for Educational and Social Research and an advisory committee consisting of Anton Hartman (Chairman), F.C.L. Bosman (Vice-chair and representative of the Music council), Jan Bouws, Mr. D.I.C. de Villiers. Dr P.J. du Toit, Dr Yvonne Huskisson, Miss Aïda Lovell, Dr P.M. Robbertse (head of the National Bureau for Educational and Social Research), Percival Kirby and Malan. With the establishment of the Human Sciences Research Council (HSRC) on 1 April 1969, oversight of SAME shifted to the HSRC's Institute for Languages, Literature and Arts.

Work on SAME was predominantly driven by Malan, assisted by an administrative secretary and a small group of informally-appointed sub-editors including Lily Wolpowitz, Percival Kirby, George Jackson, John Blacking and Jan Bouws. There was significant challenges with sourcing material for the encyclopedia, including insufficient existing research, a general "apathy to preserve our cultural heritage" which had resulted in many of the details "slip[ping] back into complete obscurity, and even oblivion", the "complete inaccessibility" of much of the necessary source material and a lack of trained scholars to act as contributors. As a result, contributions were often sought from a wide range of individuals, including amateur scholars, music enthusiasts, as well as musicians and their family members. Malan also greatly relied on his personal network of friends, colleagues and acquaintances to obtain information and source possible respondents. This reliance on these "networks had the potential to create echo chambers where the existent biases of its constituent individuals were simply repeated. The information Malan could obtain would also have been limited by whatever knowledge and expertise his personal networks (and their immediate networks) could muster."

One hundred fifty-five individuals eventually contributed to the compilation of the encyclopedia. In addition to Malan, other well-known music scholars and writers who contributed numerous entries include Percival Kirby, Frits Stegmann and Dr GG Cillié.

== Scope and contents ==
Malan claimed that encyclopedia brought "the totality of South African musical life under the spotlight". Its contents are spread over four volumes comprising 988 entries and 1 163 stub entries. Entries consider a range of topics, including composers, musicians, orchestras, musical societies, dance and dancers, the history of music in specific towns and so-called musical families. A distinguishing category of entries in SAME are those entries that document the musical history various South(ern) African towns and cities. Important cities such as Pretoria and Johannesburg as well as various small towns such as Barberton are included. Whilst work was started on entries for the important historical centres Stellenbosch, Paarl and Cape Town, these were never completed due to a variety of challenges.

Recent analysis of the entries has shown that 'light' music(ians) and African music(ians) make up only 3% and 1% of the entries respectively. There are, however, more pages dedicated to African music(ians) - 17% of the encyclopedia - as a result of the centralisation of much of the related content into two main entries 'Bantu composers' and 'Indigenous Musics of South Africa'.

Entries for more as many as 200 composers appear. For well-known white South African composers (e.g. Arnold van Wyk, Stefans Grové and John Joubert), discussions on the composer's style in addition to the standard work lists appear. Several Dutch and Flemish composers who never visited South Africa but had composed songs to Afrikaans poetry were also included. Only five black composers received individual entries: Reuben Caluza, Benjamin Tyamzashe, Michael Mosoeu Moerane, John Knox Bokwe and Joshua Pulumo Mohapeloa. A lengthy entry by Yvonne Huskisson (with an introduction by Percival Kirby) on "Bantu Composers of South Africa" is organised according to the missionary and other education centres at which these composers received their training. This "emphasis on the role of the white missionaries in these composers' training" has led Mieke Struwig to argue that it "reinforces the well-hashed apartheid idea that Black musicians needed white mentors to 'guide' them into civilisation – musical and otherwise". The entry is concluded with a brief discussion of jazz and urban Black music. Whilst this discussion mentions musicians such as Dollar Brand, Kippie Moeketsi, Hugh Masekela and Jonas Gwangwa, there is no mention of apartheid politics and political/artistic exile.

== Reception ==
The various volumes of SAME were met with mixed reviews upon publication. Afrikaans scholars, or scholars based at Afrikaans universities, in general tended to hold more positive views of the encyclopedia. Following the publication of the first volume, UNISA-affiliated musicologists Derik Van der Merwe and Bernard van der Linde declared that its publication was one of the most important events in the history of South African music studies. Arthur Wegelin noted, in turn, that the publication of SAME would ultimately assist researchers in their efforts to make South African music studies as influential and respected as its European counterparts.

In his review of the first volume, Arthur Wegelin, noted that it connected previously thought to be unconnected aspects of South African musical life. Wegelin also considered the entry on Bantu Composers as particularly important considering that South African indigenous musics had been "neglected" at South African universities. Although Izak Grové was similarly positive in his review, he noted a few linguistic, editorial and presentational inconsistencies.

Volume I was also well received by the editor of the South African Music Teacher, Michael Whiteman, and the publication's Afrikaans editor, Retha Theron. Nevertheless, Whiteman also commented on various of editorial inconsistencies and noted the apparent arbitrariness of the selection of town histories. His praise for the "Bantu composer" entry was accompanied by a call for an entry on "Ethnic musics of Southern Africa", perhaps with contributions by "some of the many African musicians now academically trained ... for the sake of strict authenticity". In turn, Theron declared SAME an "important milestone" in the documentation of South African music and praised its accuracy, thoroughness and the inclusion of interesting anecdotes (Whiteman and Theron, 1980:8). Theron also noted (unspecified) gaps in the encyclopedia's coverage.

In contrast to such celebratory accounts of SAME, other scholars – particularly those based at English universities in South Africa or internationally – were critical of SAME's shortcomings on the subjects of Black South African music and popular music and its 'political/ideological bias'".

In his review of Volume II, Veit Erlmann remarked that "... the general bias of the encyclopedia is unmistakably towards Western music, thereby reflecting the dominant 'white' culture and the way in which it wishes to present itself". He proceeded to note that the value of the indigenous musics section (which comprises about half the volume) is substantially diminished by the fact that interest in traditional African music during apartheid often resulted from an attempt to justify separate development. Morné Bezuidenhout voiced similar concerns, noting SAME's lack of coverage of Black popular music and jazz.

Various internationally-based scholars also commented on SAME. In his review, Stanley Glasser critiqued the lack of coverage of African music and Black popular musicians but noted that popular music in general was absent. Also critiquing the mere "perfunctory mention" of coloured and Black jazz and popular musicians, composer John Joubert also noted the seemingly arbitrary choice of towns covered, the omission of important information due to too early cut-off points for gathering information and the need for consistency across the photographic illustrations and music examples. Joubert nevertheless lauded Blacking's capable handling of the "Indigenous Musics" entry and decreed the work a landmark of South African music scholarship, even if it only represented a hopeful beginning. In addition to pointing to the now well-acknowledged lack of attention to Black music and musicians, Ruth Thackeray stated that full coverage should have been possible in a country with comparatively young musical traditions. Thackeray also found the seriousness with which the entries were written at odds with SAME's "anecdotal" nature and its documentation of "trivial" content.

== Status ==
In line with the reviews of the international scholars above, Christine Lucia has more recently pointed to SAME's saturation with "the apartheid discourse of the 1970s and 80s", its "sweeping ideological frame of reference [which] herds Black South African musics into reduced representations of the 'Bantu'" and its omission of popular music. SAME's publication in Afrikaans and the involvement of Malan (whom Lucia considers a particularly problematic scholar) leads Lucia to position SAME in opposition to explicitly anti-apartheid musical scholarship by scholars such as Christopher Ballantine and Richard Salmon.

In a response to Lucia, Stephanus Muller has problematised the juxtaposition of SAME to explicitly anti-apartheid texts, arguing that this suggests that Malan was "a political activist waiting to exploit 'the possibilities of a new kind of (white) critical inscription'", rather than a "passive, surveying subject—typical of the positivistic attitudes of a scholarship believing in 'objectivity' and of Malan's work in particular". For Muller, SAME should not be considered as part of the "discursive realm of [Afrikaner nationalist] political activism", but rather as simply "ideologically complicit scholarship" filled with "the complacencies of the apartheid assumptions". Winfried Lüdemann has also problematised many of the earlier "perhaps unfair" critiques of SAME, and argues that SAME "reflect[s] the kind of scholarship that [wa]s available at the time of its compilation".

An in-depth consideration of SAME has recently been conducted by Mieke Struwig. In addition to an account of the compilation and analysis of the composition of the encyclopedia, Struwig views the encyclopedia as a "textual field of social, political and aesthetic explication", reading its silences and foci as an explication of the project of music scholarship in South Africa at the time of its compilation. The limitations of the "field and disciplinary structures of the time" that Struwig identifies in this way are: "significant blind spots in terms of popular music (Black and white); a general lack of scholarship on African music (particularly in terms of its aesthetic rather than ethnographic value); a certain characteristic domesticity surrounding the discipline, its participants and its endeavours; an unequal educational system that fractured Black intellectual life (effecting Malan's ability to obtain information from Black scholars); a recurrent European orientation (in the inclusion of European musicians and composers who were only marginally relevant to South Africa), as well as a depoliticised and ethnographically unmoored form of music historiography that enabled a general (white) South African nationalism to be normatively expressed" .

With regards to the latter point, Struwig acknowledges the importance that the text held for Afrikaans music scholars, yet identifies a more general white South African nationalism, rather than exclusively Afrikaner nationalism, present in SAME. Whilst Western art music in South Africa already "represented a convenient shared identity and heritage for white South Africans" because of its origins in "a confluence of various Western European traditions", SAME harnessed the power of this shared heritage further through "eschew[ing] all political aspects of these traditions" in its the approach to historiography in the encyclopedia.

== Legacy ==
SAME is currently serving as the basis for the compilation of a new online and open access Southern African Encyclopedia of Music & Sound within Wikipedia. This encyclopedia project, led by the Africa Open Institute at Stellenbosch University, will

"serve a decolonial function and contribute to developing African scholarship by including entries on different genres, styles, traditions, cultures and practices in South Africa’s eleven official languages, and in the longer run also include other Southern African and African languages. Thus, it will open the field of Southern African music and sound studies to as wide a readership as possible."

== Bibliography ==
- Africa Open Institute for Music, Research and Innovation (2024). Southern African Encyclopedia of Music & Sound. https://aoinstitute.ac.za/southern-african-encyclopedia-of-music-and-sound/
- Bezuidenhout, M. (1986) Review of The South African Music Encyclopedia Vols. III & IV by Malan, J.P. (ed.). South African Journal of Musicology (SAMUS), 6(1), 94–96.
- Erlmann, V. (1983) Review of The South African Music Encyclopedia: Vol. II by Malan, J.P. (ed.). African Music, 6(3), 118–120. https://doi.org/10.21504/amj.v6i3
- Glasser, S. (1986) Review of In Township Tonight! South Africa's Black City Music and Theatre by Coplan, D. and South African Music Encyclopedia: Volume III by Malan, J.P. (ed.). African Affairs, 85(341), 620–622. https://doi.org/10.1093/oxfordjournals.afraf.a097827
- Grové, I. (1985) Review of Die Suid-Afrikaanse Musiekensiklopedie: Deel II by Malan, J.P. (ed.). South African Journal of Musicology (SAMUS), 5, 51–52.
- Henning, C.G. (1977) 'Research on South African Music History: Its Application to the teaching of music history in the Republic', Ars Nova, 9(1), 25–37. https://doi.org/10.1080/03796487708566390
- Joubert, J. (1987) 'Formative Years', Times Literary Supplement, 8 May.
- Kirby, P.R. (1966, July 14) Correspondence from P.R. Kirby to J.P. Malan. Document held in HSRC Collection (Kirby Folder) at the National Archives of South Africa, Pretoria.
- Lucia, C. (2005a) 'Introduction', in Lucia, C. (ed.) The World of South African Music: A Reader. Newcastle-upon-Tyne: Cambridge Scholars Press, xxii–xlvi.
- Lüdemann, W.A. (2020) Windows on South African Art Music in the European Tradition. Senior doctoral dissertation. Stellenbosch University. http://hdl.handle.net/10019.1/109124
- Malan, J.P. (1979a) 'Introduction', in Malan, J.P. (ed.) South African Music Encyclopedia: Volume I. Cape Town: Oxford University Press, i-iii.
- Malan, J.P. (ed.) (1979b) South African Music Encyclopedia: Volume I. Cape Town: Oxford University Press.
- Malan, J.P. (1980) 'Besinning oor die SAME in die Suid-Afrikaanse Musieklewe', Ars Nova, 12, 5–10. https://doi.org/10.1080/03796488008566414
- Malan, J.P. (ed.) (1982) South African Music Encyclopedia: Volume II. Cape Town: Oxford University Press.
- Malan, J.P. (ed.) (1984) South African Music Encyclopedia: Volume III. Cape Town: Oxford University Press.
- Malan, J.P. (ed.) (1986) South African Music Encyclopedia: Volume IV. Cape Town: Oxford University Press.
- Muller, S. (2007) Review of The World of South African Music: A Reader by Lucia, C. (ed.). Fontes Artis Musicae, 54(3), 374–379. http://www.jstor.org/stable/23510778.
- Struwig, M. (2024) An Intellectual History of Institutionalised Music Studies in South Africa. PhD Dissertation, Stellenbosch University. https://scholar.sun.ac.za/handle/10019.1/130248
- Thackeray, R. (1986) Review of South African Music Encyclopedia: Vols. II & III by Malan, J.P. (ed.). The Musical Times, 127(1719), 337–338. https://doi.org/10.2307/965078
- Van der Merwe, D. and Van der Linde, B. (1980) 'Van die Redaksie/Editorial Comment', Ars Nova, 12, vi–vii. https://doi.org/10.1080/03796488008566412
- Wegelin, A. (1981) Review of South African Music Encyclopedia: Vol. I by Malan, J.P (ed.). South African Journal of Musicology (SAMUS), 1, 91–94.
- Whiteman, M. and Theron, R. (1980) 'The New S.A. Music Encyclopedia'. Review of the South African Music Encyclopedia: Vol. 1 by Malan, J.P. (ed.). The South African Music Teacher, 97, 6–8.
