= Voortrekkers (youth organisation) =

South African youth organization

- The official emblem of the Voortrekkers
- Formation: September 30, 1931; 95 years ago
- Website: voortrekkers.co.za

Voortrekkers

Flag of the former Natalia Republic, re-adopted by the organisation

The Voortrekkers is an Afrikaner youth organisation, founded in South Africa in 1931, for Afrikaner boys and girls. It tries to develop resilience, service, leadership and a good character through team meetings, skills development and camping in nature, with the opportunity for whole families to get involved. The movement is based on Christian nationalist principles.

== Mission, values and principles ==
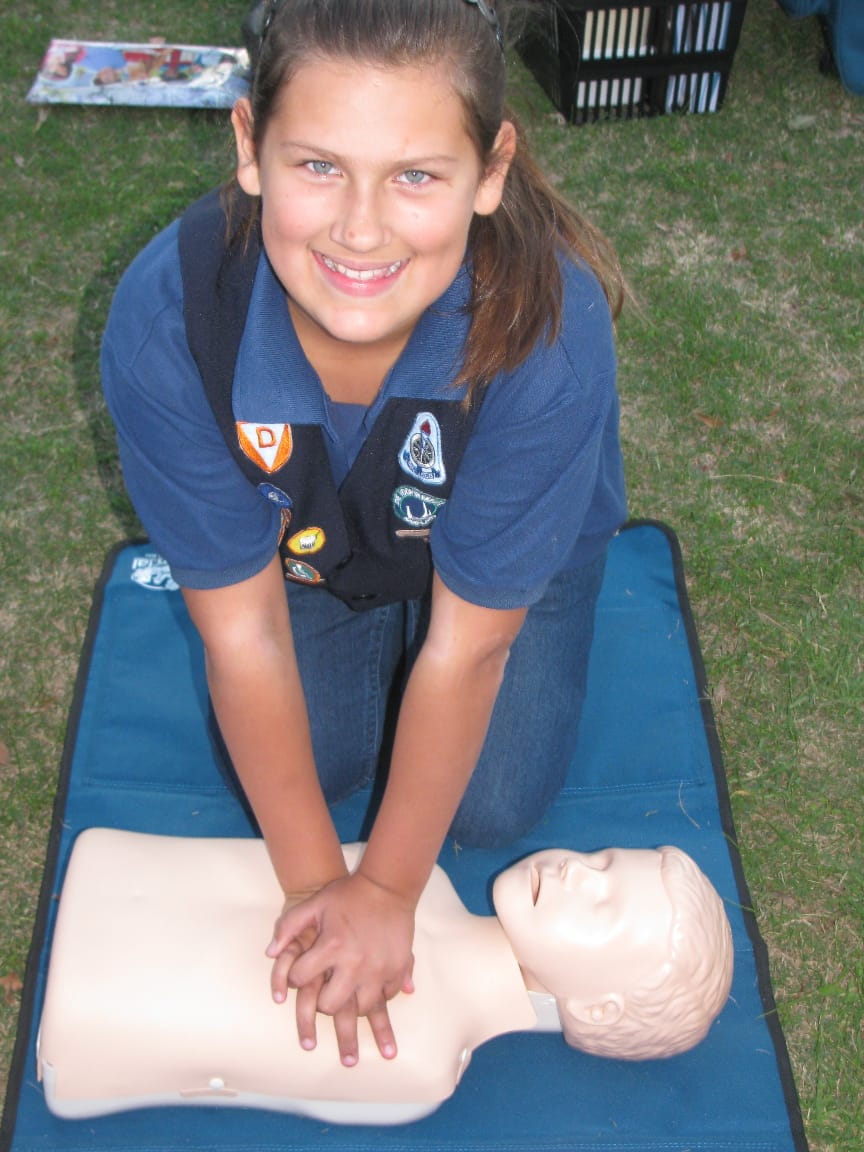
Voortrekker girl receiving first aid training. She is wearing the new (current) style uniform.

In the words of its mission statement (as translated), "The Voortrekkers is a cultural movement that equips our members, especially the youth, to live out their calling through service as modern Afrikaners, positive citizens and consistent Christians."

The motto of the movement, "Hou Koers", translates as "Hold [your] Course". The values of the organisation are encapsulated in what is referred to as "The ABC".

=== The ABC ===
- Afrikanerskap (Being an Afrikaner)
- Burgerskap (Citizenship)
- Christenskap (Christianity).

The ten principles that guide the members of the movement are:

1. A Voortrekker believes in the triune God and serves Him.
2. A Voortrekker's word is his honor.
3. A Voortrekker is obedient.
4. A Voortrekker lives with respect.
5. A Voortrekker is proud of his language, culture and heritage, and promotes it.
6. A Voortrekker learns from history and builds on it.
7. A Voortrekker appreciates and conserves his environment.
8. A Voortrekker is a true leader.
9. A Voortrekker is observant and resilient.
10. A Voortrekker is serviceable.

== History ==
=== 1913-1940 ===
The founding of the Voortrekkers coincided with a growth in Afrikaner nationalism in South Africa, then a member of the British Commonwealth. In some ways the Voortrekker organisation represents an Afrikaans-language alternative to the largely English-speaking Boy Scout movement, with its British heritage.

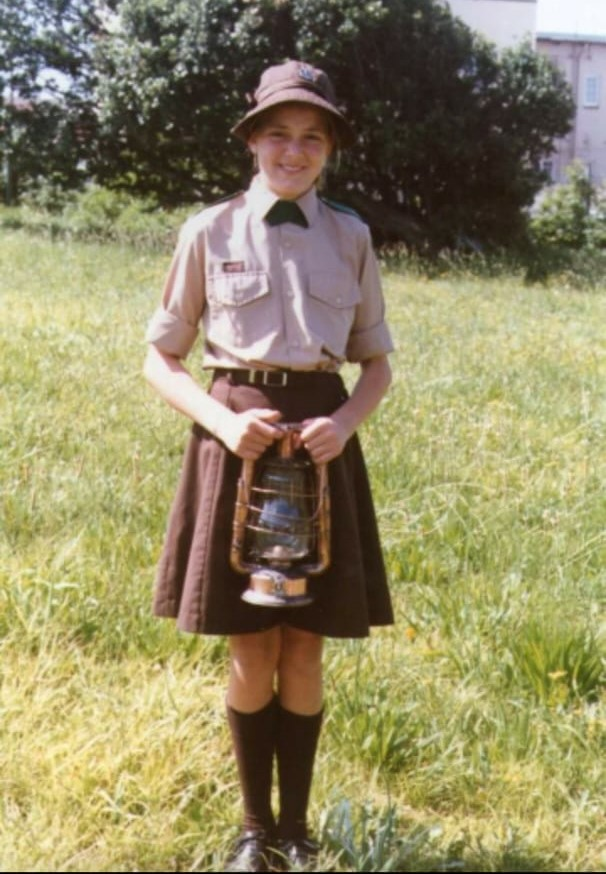
Voortrekker-girl dressed in the previous (older) Voortrekker-uniform.

Dr. C. F. Visser formulated the original concept of a youth movement amongst Afrikaners in 1913 in Bloemfontein. Dr. Visser appealed to the directors of the Boy Scout movement (founded in 1907 and spreading to South Africa from 1908) to allow the incorporation of the Voortrekkers into the "broader church" under one umbrella, but this venture failed. The Scouts were in the main speakers of English, and differences about the role of language led to difficulties. There were further complications hinging upon religious declarations or beliefs, and no agreement could be reached. The values and principles of the Voortrekker organisation were perceived, at the time, to be more nationalistic and religious in tone than those of the Scouting Movement programme.

In 1920 the first "Kommando" of the Voortrekkers (English equivalent: "Troop") was established in Bloemfontein at the Central High School. In 1923 two more kommandos started - in Graaf Reinet (led by "Oom Japie Heese") and in Nieuwoudtville (with "Oom Laubie" as leader). (Note: the term Oom in Afrikaans ("Uncle") is, amongst other things, an honorific and is equivalent to the "Colonel" in "Colonel Sanders" of KFC).

The official establishment of the Voortrekker movement dates from 30 September 1931. (This is distinct from the early endeavours of the informal movement established by Dr. C. F. Visser (also called "Vader (Father) Visser", seen as the father of the movement)). Dr. N.J. van der Merwe became the first "Hoofleier" (Chief leader) of the movement. Gen. J.B.M. Hertzog welcomed the first official Voortrekkers in the movement.

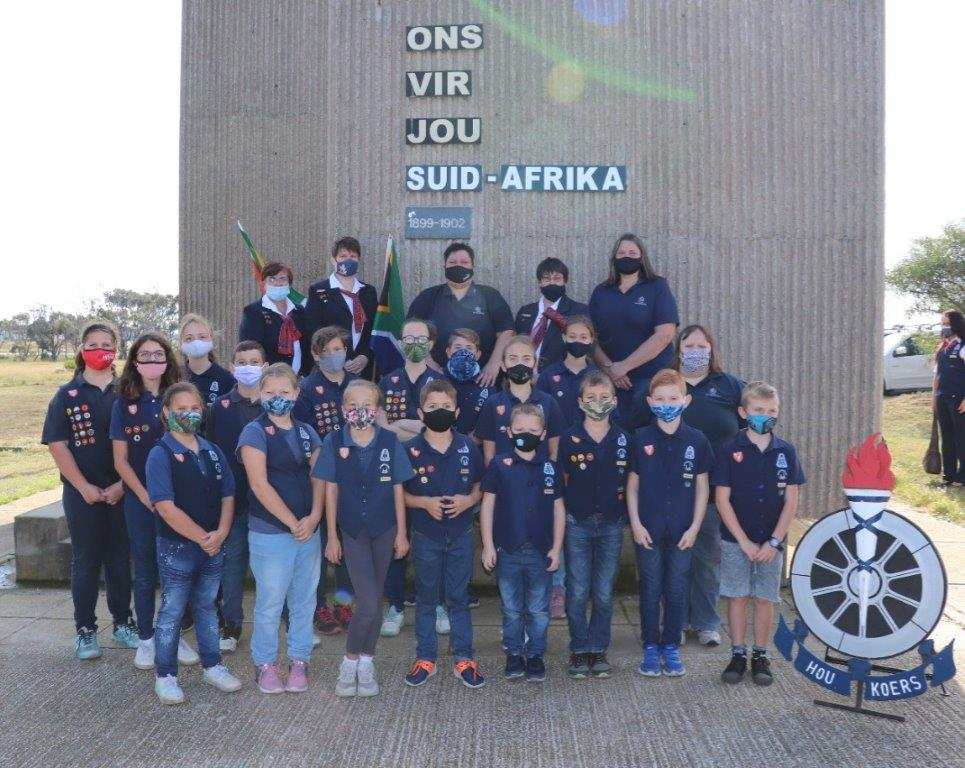
Voortrekker children attending a memorial service at Karel Landman Monument near Alexandria, Eastern Cape. Children are wearing the new (current) standard attire.

In 1939 the Voortrekkers took part in the laying of the foundation stone at the Voortrekker Monument in Pretoria. Voortrekkers and other Afrikaners celebrated this event widely, walking with burning torches in many locations in South Africa.

=== 1940-1959 ===
In 1940, Dr. C. F. Visser became the leader of the Voortrekkers. The members of the organisation celebrated the completion of the Voortrekker Monument in 1949. They also contributed to the festival of van Riebeeck in Cape Town in 1952, where the arrival of Jan van Riebeeck in Table Bay in 1652 was commemorated.

=== 1959-1966 ===
Dr. J. de V. Heese (“Oom Japie”) became the new leader of the Voortrekkers in 1959. He had previously served as the General Secretary of the movement. Heese died in 1966.

=== 1966-1981 ===
In 1966, “Oom Badie Badenhorst”, was elected as leader of the Voortrekkers. During his term of office the Voortrekkers contributed to the inauguration of the monument at Bloedrivier between 13–17 December 1971 as well as the inauguration of the Taalmonument (Afrikaans language monument) in Paarl on 10 October 1975. The first “President's Verkenners” received their badges from State President C. R. Swart.

=== 1981-1989 ===
Prof. C. W. H. (“Oom Carel”) Boshoff was the leader during this period. This was a time of serious discord and argument among Afrikaners about Apartheid. Most believed that Apartheid was wrong, but some resisted change. These upheavals had a negative effect on the Voortrekker movement, but the Voortrekker leaders participated in the transition of South Africa by making submissions to CODESA.

=== 1989-1997 ===
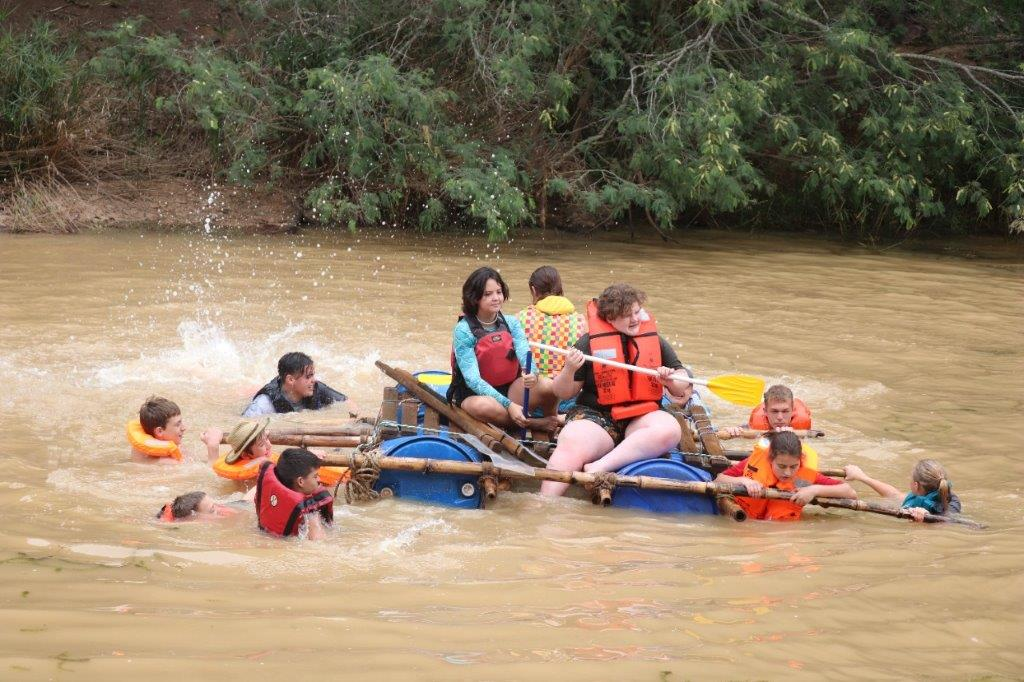
Voortrekker children taking part in a raft race at Bruintjieskraal in the Baviaanskloof, South Africa. 2021

Ds. (Reverend) J. P. L. (“Oom Johan”) van der Walt was elected as leader for the Voortrekkers in 1989. The Voortrekkers started to transform the movement in 1989, adapting its constitution for a changing South Africa.

=== 1997-2001: New symbols ===
At the Voortrekker’s national congress at Hartenbos in 1997, Prof Tom Dreyer was elected as new leader until 2001. This congress was marked by a debate whether the new South African flag from 1994 and other National symbols should be used in the Voortrekkers. The vast majority voted for Dreyer, who was in favour of adopting the new symbols. A short while after the congress, Theuns de Wet broke away with "a small group" of Voortrekkers to form the Afrikaner Kultuurbond.

During Dreyer's term, the old-fashioned and formal, militaristic uniform, was replaced with a more modern and cost-effective Voortrekker attire. This consists of a blue or red polo shirt with the emblem, jeans and dark blue waistcoat that is adorned with badges, representing the training modules that the wearer has completed.

=== 2001-2013 ===
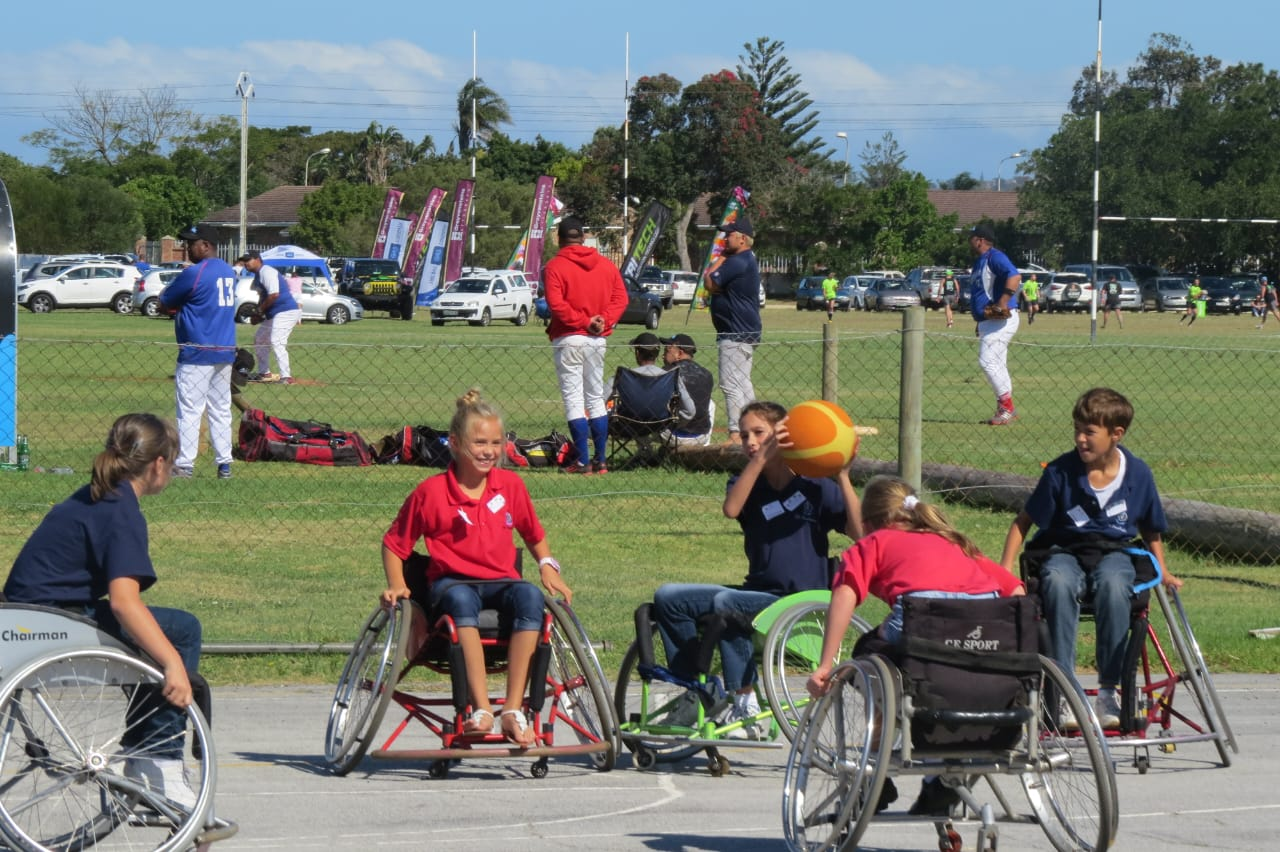
Voortrekker children taking part in a disability awareness programme with the Londt Park disabled basketball team, Port Elizabeth, South Africa. 2015

During the congress of 2001 in Pretoria, the eighth leader of the Voortrekker, Prof. T. P. Strauss (“Oom Piet”) was elected. Constant adaptations were made, and are still made, to transform the Voortrekkers to a modern and "forward-looking" youth movement for Afrikaners. At the congresses of 2005 and 2009 respectively, Prof Strauss was re-elected as leader for two more four-year terms.

=== 2013-2023 ===
At the 2013 congress, Dr Danie Langner was elected as the new Voortrekker leader. Dr Langner is also the Managing Director of the FAK (Federation of Afrikaans Cultural Associations) as of 2012.

=== 2023 - current ===
On 14 July 2023 Karin Stofberg was elected as the first female leader in the organization's 93-year existence, succeeding Langner. Stoffberg wants to renew and market the movement and she would like to establish an improved digital strategy.

== Organisation ==
Organisationally, the Voortrekkers are divided into a number of gebiede (areas) which loosely correspond to the South African provinces, which in turn are subdivided into oorde (districts) and then kommandos (commandos or troops). Each kommando consists of a number of spanne (teams) divided according to age groups.

=== Membership levels ===
At primary-school level (ages 5–12), members are known as Penkoppe (boys) and Drawwertjies (girls); the emphasis at this stage is to develop personal leadership qualities.

In high school (ages 13–17), members are referred to as Verkenners (scouts) and its emphasis is to continue what was learned in the earlier primary-school phase by applying its lessons to developing general leadership skills.

Young adult members (ages 18–30) are known as Staatmakers (dependables), with the program emphasising training for leadership positions at its several levels of organisation.

== See also ==
- Ernest George Jansen
