= Tenpin Bowling Association of South Africa =

Sports governing body in South Africa

- Sport: Ten-pin bowling
- Jurisdiction: South Africa
- Abbreviation: TBASA
- Affiliation: World Bowling
- President: Kiley Cassel

Official website
- www.tenpinbowling.co.za
- (South Africa)

The Tenpin Bowling Association of South Africa (TBASA) is the recognised official governing body of the sport of ten-pin bowling in South Africa. It is the sanctioning body recognised by World Bowling, the sport's world governing body to organise competitions in South Africa, and is responsible for the growth and development of the sport. It is also affiliated to European Tenpin Bowling Federation, Commonwealth Tenpin Bowling Federation, as well as SASCOC. TBASA is responsible for the award of official coaching qualifications for the sport in South Africa.

TBASA organises competitions at all levels of development and was behind the founding of the continental governing body World Bowling Africa in 2016, in an attempt to establish and develop the African zone of tenpin bowling in conjunction with World Bowling. The South African tenpin bowling men's and women's national team won the inaugural African Nations Tournament in 2017. TBASA holds national competitions for singles, teams and seniors (over 50) including the TBASA Cup.

== See also ==
- Sport in South Africa
