= Jan Bouws =

- Born: 28 July 1902; Purmerend, Netherlands
- Died: 26 January 1978 (aged 75); Cape Town, South Africa
- Occupation: Musicologist
- Known for: Work on Afrikaans folk music, history of South African music
- Spouse: Juliana Bouws van Heijningen
- Awards: Stalsprys (Suid-Afrikaanse Akademie vir Wetenskap en Kuns); Medal of Honour (Suid-Afrikaanse Akademie vir Wetenskap en Kuns); Honorary Award (FAK)

Jan Bouws (1902-1978) was a Dutch-born musicologist and folk music scholar, known for his contributions to the study and preservation of South African folk music. He was instrumental in the establishment and development of South African musicology through both his work as educator and researcher, often being described as “one of the pioneers of South African musicology”.

== Early life and education ==
Jan Bouws was born on July 28, 1902, in Purmerend, Netherlands. Although educated and working as a schoolteacher in Amsterdam, Bouws studied musicology part-time at the University of Amsterdam with Karel Philipus Bernet Kempers and Jos Smits van Waesberghe. Bouws married Juliana van Heijningen, a writer and researcher, with whom he had two sons, Niels and Jan.

== Career and contributions ==
In 1960, Bouws moved to South Africa to establish and direct the Institute for Folk Music at Stellenbosch University. Here he also lectured music history and palaeography at the University's music department. He received his D.Phil. from Stellenbosch University in 1965 with a dissertation on the musical life of Cape Town from 1800–1850. Bouws retired from the university in 1972, but continued to do research and publish.

Bouws was a prolific scholar, producing more than 1,000 research items in numerous formats including books, contributions to encyclopedias, articles in academic journals, newspaper and magazine articles, radio talks, and lectures. Many of his articles and encyclopedia contributions were published in international publications, including Die Musik in Geschichte und Gegenwart. These works cover a variety of topics, such as Afrikaans folk music (1958, 1962), contemporary South African composers (1957, 1971), and the history of music in South Africa (1966, 1972, 1982). As a composer, Bouws is best known for setting Afrikaans poetry to music, including the well-known piece "Op my ou ramkietjie" ("On My Old Ramkietjie"), with lyrics by C. Louis Leipoldt.

Bouws also advanced South African music in practical ways by organizing radio broadcasts for South African compositions abroad, finding European publishers for South African musical works, and convincing several eminent Dutch composers to set Afrikaans poetry to music

== Awards and recognition ==
Bouws received several honors for his work, including:

- The Suid-Afrikaanse Akademie vir Wetenskap en Kuns’s (The South African Academy for Science and Art) Medal of Honour in 1959 for his contributions to the knowledge of Afrikaans music
- The Suid-Afrikaanse Akademie vir Wetenskap en Kuns's Stalsprys in 1968 for his contributions to cultural history (in particular for his Die Musieklewe van Kaapstad, 1800–1850)
- An honorary award from the Federasie van Afrikaanse Kultuurvereniginge (FAK) in 1972 for his work on Afrikaans folk songs

== Critiques ==
Scholars have criticized Bouws's methodologies and scholarship for a variety of reasons. Carina Venter argues that Bouws frequently published the same material with minimal changes, resulting in a repetitive and stagnant body of work. Venter also critiques Bouws's lack of critical engagement with his subjects, pointing to his short book chapters and preference for factual statements over deeper analysis as evidence of this. For Venter, this approach, along with his avoidance of a distinct authorial voice, is a significant shortcoming in his research

Recent critiques by Becky Steltzner, Rebecca Sandmeier, and Erik Dippenaar have raised significant concerns about the accuracy of Bouws's historical research. Steltzner argues that Bouws's use of sources is problematic, as he often relied on secondary or tertiary sources rather than primary documents, undermining the reliability of his conclusions. Sandmeier contends that Bouws's research was influenced by political and ideological biases, citing his claim that Charles Etienne Boniface was the first South African composer despite insufficient evidence. Dippenaar extends this critique to suggest that Bouws's analysis was compromised by his preconceived intentions and ideological perspectives, leading to a distortion of historical facts. Dippenaar highlights that Bouws's aim to identify “Western ideals” in South Africa may have resulted in an exaggerated assessment of certain historical artifacts and events.

== Death ==
Bouws died on January 26, 1978, in Parow, Western Cape.

== Selected publications ==
- Bouws, J. (1946) Musiek in Suid-Afrika. Brugge: Uitgeverij Voorland Brugge.
- Bouws, J. (1957) Suid-Afrikaanse komponiste van vandag en gister. Cape Town: Balkema.
- Bouws, J. (1958) Die Afrikaanse volkslied. Johannesburg: F.A.K.
- Bouws, J. (1961) Woord en wys van die Afrikaanse lied. Cape Town: H.A.U.M.
- Bouws, J. (1962) Die Volkslied, weerklank van 'n volk se hartklop. Cape Town: H.A.U.M.
- Bouws, J. (1964) Maatgespeel – ’n bundel musiekjoernalistiek. Cape Town: Human & Rousseau. (Essays on music published in Die Burger, Die Huisgenoot, Res Musicae, Die Sondagblad, Standpunte, Die Taalgenoot, en Tydskrif vir Letterkunde).
- Bouws, J. (1966) Die Musieklewe van Kaapstad, 1800–1850, en sy Verhouding tot die Musiekkultuur van Wes-Europa. Cape Town: Balkema.
- Bouws, J. (1971) Komponiste van Suid-Afrika. Stellenbosch: C.F. Albertyn.
- Bouws, J. (1972) Geskiedenis van die musiekonderwys in Suid-Afrika. Nasionale Opvoedkundige Uitgewery.
- Bouws, J. (1982) Solank daar musiek is… musiek en musiekmakers in Suid-Afrika 165–1982. Cape Town: Tafelberg. (Editing by Juliana Bouws-Van Heijningen.)

== Bibliography ==
- Biography on SA History http://www.sahistory.org.za/people/jan-bouws
- Biography on Stellenbosch Writers.
- Bouws, J. (1965) Die Musieklewe van Kaapstad, 1800 – 1850, en sy Verhouding tot die Musiekkultuur van Wes-Europa. Unpublished doctoral dissertation. Stellenbosch University.
- Dippenaar, E.G.D.V. (2021) Conquering the Cape: the role of domestic keyboard instruments in colonial society and the colonisation process. Doctoral dissertation. University of Cape Town.
- Lüdemann, W.A (2005) ‘Die Konservatorium en Musiekwetenskap’, in Grové, I.J. (ed.) Konservatorium 1905–2005: Die Departement Musiek en die Konservatorium by die Geleentheid van die Eeufees. Stellenbosch: SUN Press, 102–105.
- Sandmeier, R. (2018) In search of ‘The first South African composer’: The potholes and pitfalls of researching the history of Western music in South Africa. University of Cape Town: Inaugural lecture.
- Steltzner, B.L. (2016) The History of the Clarinet in South Africa. Doctoral dissertation. University of Cape Town.
- Struwig, M. (2024) An Intellectual History of Institutionalised Music Studies in South Africa. PhD dissertation. Stellenbosch University.
- Venter, C. (2009) The Influence of Early Apartheid Intellectualisation on Twentieth-Century Afrikaans Music Historiography. Master's thesis. Stellenbosch University.
