= Bakers (bakery) =

South African food company

Bakers Limited
- Type: Private
- Industry: Food manufacturing
- Founded: 1851; 175 years ago
- Founder: John Michael Leonard Baumann
- Headquarters: Johannesburg, South Africa
- Area served: South Africa
- Products: Biscuits
- Owner: AVI Limited (via National Brands Limited)
- Website: http://www.bakers.co.za

Bakers Limited, commonly known as Bakers, is a South African food manufacturing company that produces a wide variety of savoury and sweet biscuits.

Bakers is part of National Brands Limited, an FMCG company which is a subsidiary of South African holding company AVI Limited. Bakers products are manufactured in Durban, Pretoria, and Johannesburg.

== History ==
The company commenced when John Frederick Baumann migrated from England to South Africa, where in 1851 at the age of 26 he established a grocery and bread bakery in Durban, in the British Colony of Natal (now a province of South Africa).

In 1879, Baumann visited London where he met with his nephew, John Michael Leonard Baumann, suggesting he emigrate to South Africa. J. M. L. Baumann had previously left his native village in Niederstetten, Germany at the age of 16, and moved to London where he worked as a baker's assistant before acquiring his own bakery business.

J. M. L. Baumann arrived in Durban in 1881 and joined his uncle's bakery and grocery business. A few years later when the lease on their premises expired, J. M. L. Baumann purchased the bakery operations from his uncle. He bought a site at the corner of Brickhill Road and West Street, where he constructed a small building.

In 1885, Baumann purchased a hand-operated biscuit machine for £65 from another baker, Plowright. The machine produced 'dry' biscuits for sale to ships and army garrisons.

In 1895 Baumann purchased an advanced biscuit machine and commenced manufacture of more 'fancy biscuits' such as Ginger Nuts and Marie. He printed his first price list and operated under the name L. Baumann & Co The factory survived the anti-German riots of 1915 when the shop and bread and cake premises were burnt down.

At the time, the biscuit factory was producing biscuits for the army, and two of JML Baumann's sons were fighting the Germans in the then German colony of South West Africa (now Namibia). The factory was put under government protection to prevent further damage.

Due to the anti-German sentiment in 1915, the company's name was changed from Baumann's to Bakers Limited. In 1918 Baumann's son, William, opened a biscuit factory in Cape Town, the business was registered in October 1918 as Selected Products Ltd, trading as Baumann's Biscuits. William sold the company back to Bakers Limited in 1922 but continued to operate it as a subsidiary.

At the beginning of the 1930s, almost 200 people were employed and the 1935 wholesale catalogue listed 240 different biscuit lines. Originally biscuits were packed loose in tins and the company was prepared to pay railage on the empty returns.

The company then introduced packets which consisted of two layers of paper: one was the familiar blue lattice printed Bakers paper and the other inside layer was of 'pure vegetable parchment'.

In 1968 Bakers Ltd established a factory at Isando in the Transvaal. Bakers Ltd then established a new factory at Pinetown, which commenced operations on 6 December 1972. The following year the company closed their operations in Durban and consolidated them at the new Pinetown factory. In 1977 Bakers Ltd built a small factory, Lexim (Pty) Ltd, at Butterworth, Transkei.

In 1981 the company was acquired by Anglovaal Industries Limited (AVI). In 1993 AVI purchased Pyotts Pty Ltd, a savoury biscuit manufacturer, and the following year regrouped the companies under the title, Associated Biscuits.

In 1996 Associated Biscuits was consolidated into National Brands Limited.

In 2014, Bakers entered the breakfast market, launching Bakers Good Morning Breakfast biscuits.

In November 2021, American multinational food manufacturer Mondelez International was in talks to acquire AVI Limited; Bakers' parent company. However, in December of the same year, it was announced that the sale did not progress.

In April 2022, Bakers worked with design agency The Graphic Ballroom (GBR) to update the packaging of all 33 of its lines of food. GBR had been working with National Brands (the holding company of Bakers) for 15 years at that point.

== Brands ==
Bakers savoury biscuit brands include:

- Provita
- Salticrax
- Cream Crackers
- Kips
- Mini Cheddars
- Wheatsworth

Bakers sweet biscuit brands include:

- Betta Snack (whole wheat digestive biscuits)
- Romany Creams
- Tennis
- Boudoir
- Strawberry Whirls
- Iced Zoo
- Topper
- Choc-Kits
- Blue Label (Marie biscuits)
- Red Label (Lemon Cream, Strawberry Cream, Vanilla Cream, Choc Cream)
- Good Morning Breakfast biscuits
- Ginger Nuts
- nuttikrust
- Eet-Sum-Mor
- Jolly Jammers (Raspberry and Vanilla, Choc Cream)
