= Federasie van Afrikaanse Kultuurvereniginge =

- Founded: 18–19 December 1929; Bloemfontein, Orange Free State Province, Union of South Africa.
- Type: Non-governmental organisation
- Location: Voortrekker Monument, Pretoria, Republic of South Africa
- Key people: Prof. Danie Goosen (chairman); Dr. Danie Langner (managing director)
- Website: fak.org.za

The Federasie van Afrikaanse Kultuurvereniginge ("Federation of Afrikaans Cultural Associations") is a non-profit, non-governmental Afrikaans cultural organisation. Founded in 1929, it celebrated its 85th year in 2014. Its offices are situated at the Voortrekker Monument in Pretoria.

== History ==
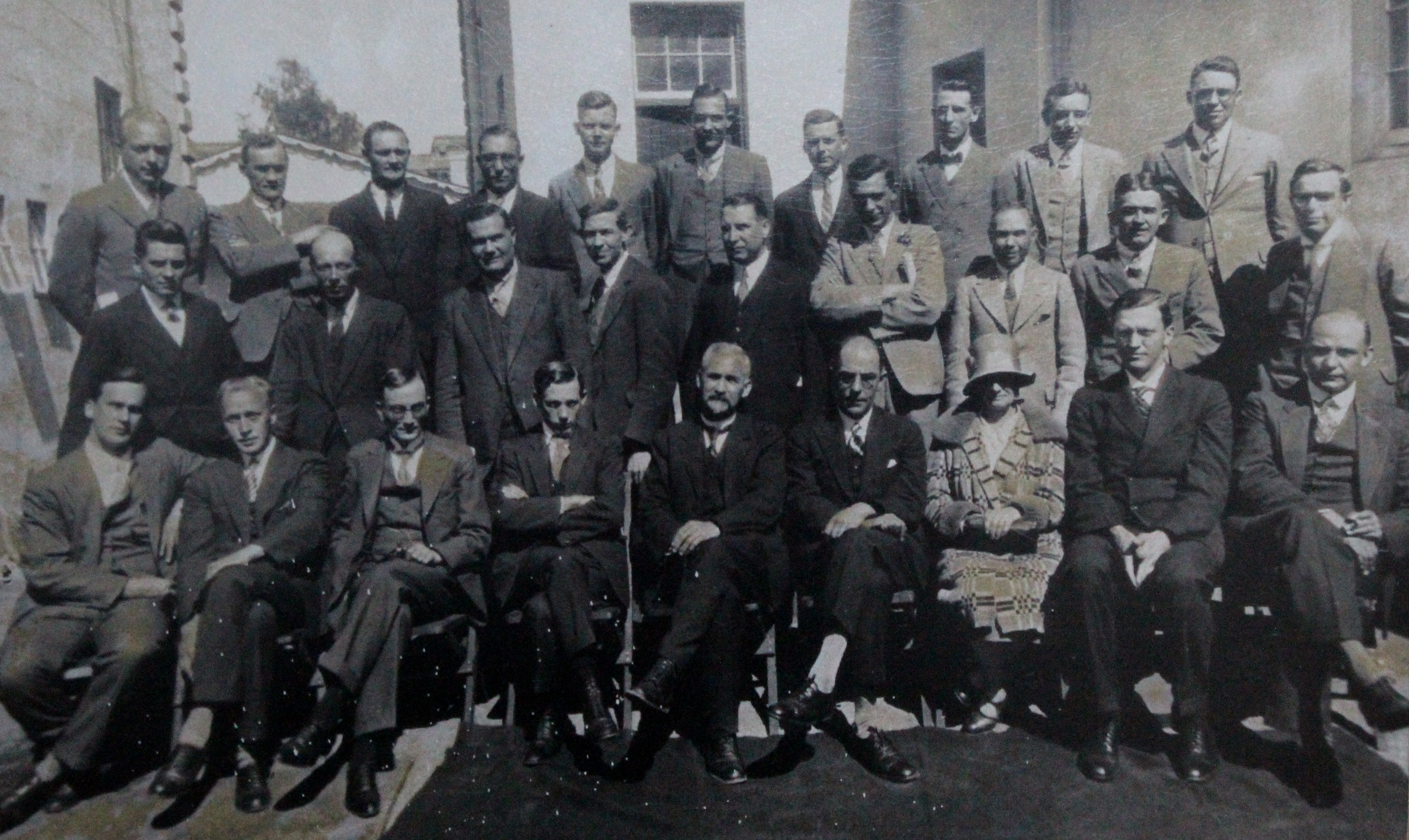
The organising committee of the FAK in 1929

In the twenties and thirties Afrikaners began to organise culturally in a variety of institutions. Despite severe political divisions among Afrikaners from the earliest times, a need was expressed for a form of cultural unity. Although the ideal of political unity remained out of reach for the time being, Afrikaners were able to achieve cultural cohesion to a large extent.

The need for an inspirational and significant cultural organisation was born out of the needs of the Afrikaner people. After the Afrikaner's lost the Boer War, their culture and heritage came under severe threat. They were being labelled as stubborn, incompetent and insignificant, some reports even suggest that Afrikaners were labelled as "donkeys" if they refused to speak English in schools. Furthermore, The economic distress of the Great Depression resulted in poor Afrikaners moving to the cities. Urbanized Afrikaners were uprooted from their traditional family support systems and their language and cultural ties came under severe pressure. Afrikaners had no training to compete professionally in the cities, they were financially impoverished, were politically and culturally insecure and isolated.

On 24 August 1929 a group of Afrikaners under the umbrella of the Suid-Afrikaanse Akademie vir Wetenskap en Kuns met to reflect upon the protection of their cultural heritage. The goal was to bring people and organisations with similar inner convictions together, and to launch actions for the enforcement of the Afrikaans language and the positive development of Afrikaner culture. Hence the FAK motto: "Handhaaf en bou" – "Maintain and build". The FAK was then founded at the Uniale Taal- en Kultuurkongres (Language and Cultural Conference of the Union) which was held at the Bloemfontein city hall on 18–19 December 1929.

== Development ==
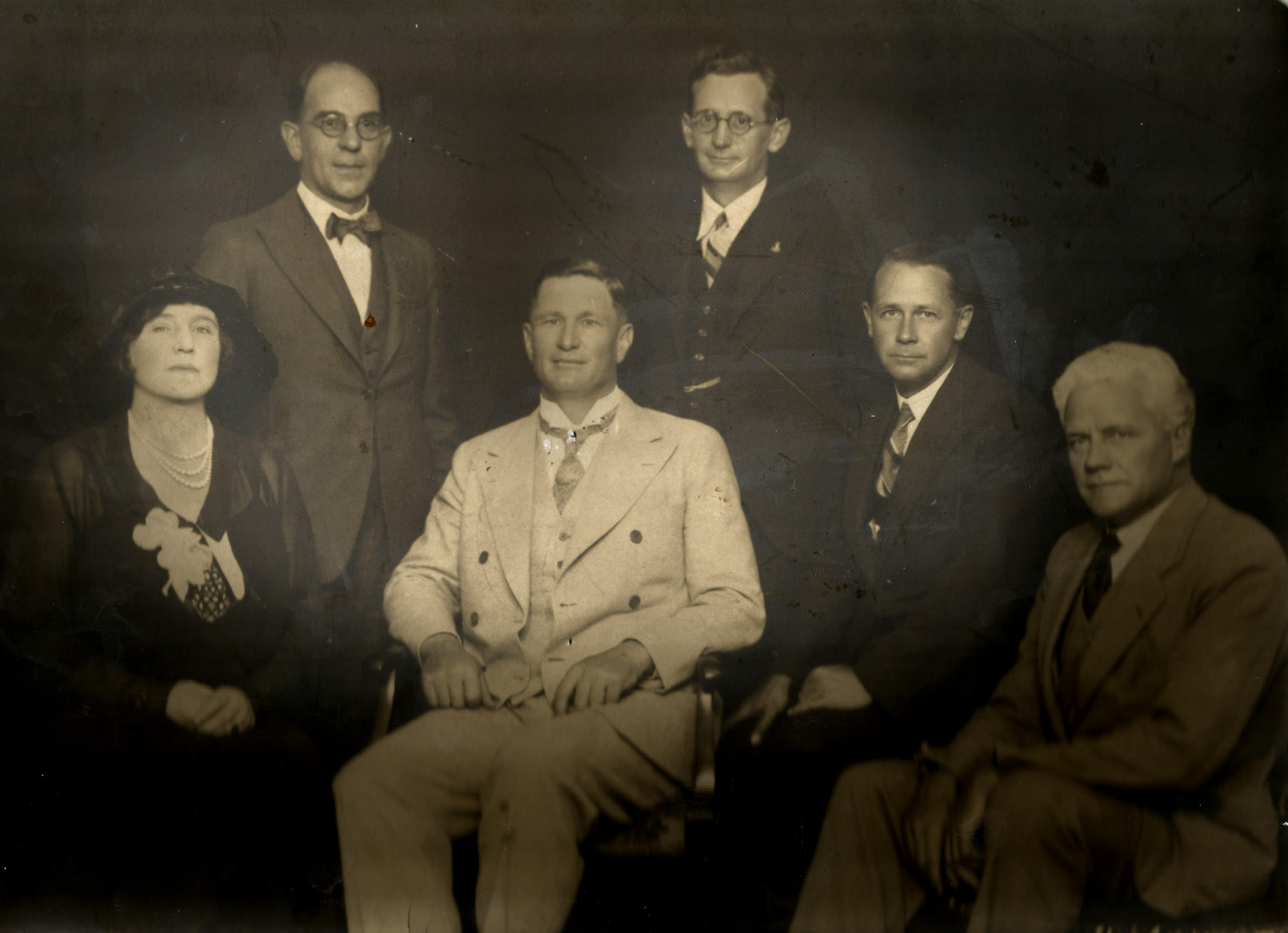
The first executive committee of the FAK

At first, the main imperative of the FAK was the maintenance of the Afrikaans language. The importance of Afrikaans glossaries was realised early on. The first published works that appeared include English-Afrikaans glossaries for automotive terms, grocers terms and butchers term. Professor PJ Nienaber was the first editor of the "Handhaaf en bou"-series (Maintain and build), which published shoemaker terms, cooking terms and photographic terms. Later English-Afrikaans glossaries for rugby, football, cricket, shooting, bridge, athletics, boxing, swimming, water polo, tennis, billiards, hockey, basketball and golf terms were published. Afrikaans was established in the agricultural area by the pamphlet series "Die boer en sy taal" – The Farmer and his language.

Although the notion of erecting a monument in commemoration of the Voortrekkers had already been mentioned by president Paul Kruger at Blood River in 1888, the idea only really came to fruition in 1930 when a small group of Afrikaners led by the famous painter Pierneef decided to take the matter further in a coordinated manner under the leadership of the FAK. On 4 April 1931 the Sentrale Volksmonumentekomitee (Central People's Monuments Committee) was founded in Bloemfontein, the FAK's first committee. The purpose of the commission was to strive towards the erection of a monument in light of the Great Trek centenary of 1938, as well as for other approved monuments. The result was the Voortrekker Monument in Pretoria, Blood River Monument, Voortrekker Monument in Winburg and the statue of Piet Retief at the Covenant Church in Pietermaritzburg.

A further milestone in the history of the FAK was the 1961 release of the Jamie Uys documentary Doodkry Is Min which highlighted the rise of the Afrikaans language and the history of the Afrikaans speaking people.

== FAK-Sangbundel ==
The idea of an Afrikaans songbook originated with the Afrikaanse Studentebond (Afrikaans Student League). Initial collection of songs was slow, thus the student league requested the FAK in 1930 to manage the entire endeavour. At a meeting on 7 March 1931, the executive committee of the FAK decided to comply with this request. The story of the FAK-Volksangbundel (People's songbook) is interwoven with the historical development of Afrikaans popular music. The first edition of the FAK songbook was published in 1937, the sequel to Mansvelt's Dutch-Afrikaans songbook (1907) and Van Niekerk's Groot Afrikaanse-Hollandse Liederebundel (1927). In these two works, 78 Afrikaans-Dutch songs were collected, of which only 28 have been incorporated in the 1937 FAK songbook of 314 songs. Of the 314 songs in the songbook 275 songs were specifically written for singing along. The massive leap from 78 songs in 1927 to 314 in 1937 indicates the tremendous development of Afrikaans music in the short space of a mere decade. The first copy of the first FAK-Volksangbundel was handed over to then chairman, dr. NJ van der Merwe on 7 June 1937 on the occasion of the FAKs annual general meeting in Bloemfontein. By the time the revised edition appeared in 1961, 60,000 copies had been sold.

In 2009 the idea arose that in view of the songbook's 75th anniversary in 2012, a new edition should be developed that acknowledges the development of Afrikaans music since 1979. The 2012 edition would be the first time in 33 years that a new songbook appeared. One of the features of the 2012 songbook is that songs appearing in previous editions would not be included in the new. In this sense the new songbook is regarded as a second volume in the Afrikaans repertoire. The new FAK-Sangbundel was distributed to many schools across South Africa and Namibia. The songbook was further introduced to music festivals at Aardklop (Potchefstroom), Woordfees (Stellenbosch), Klein Karoo Nasionale Kunstefees (Oudtshoorn) and Vryfees (Bloemfontein).

== Offices ==
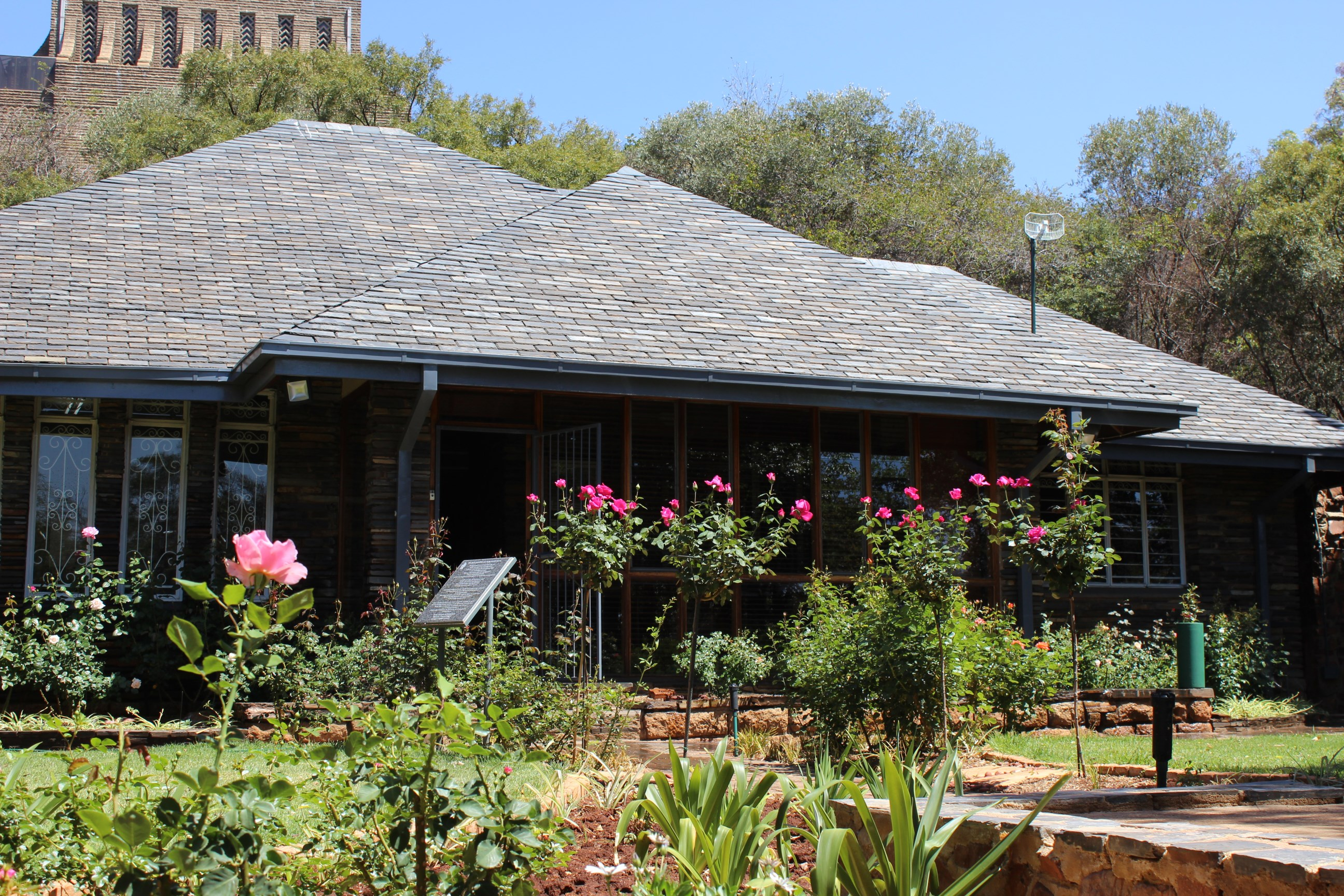
The offices of the FAK, with the Voortrekker Monument in the background

The offices of the FAK are situated in the Gerard Moerdijk-huis (house) at the Voortrekker Monument heritage site in Pretoria. The house, named after the architect responsible for the design of the monument, was originally built to accommodate the caretaker. When Die Eike (The Oaks) in Auckland Park, Johannesburg, where the FAK had its offices, came up for sale in 2002, the offices were moved to Pretoria.
