= Anton Hartman =

Anton Carlisle Hartman
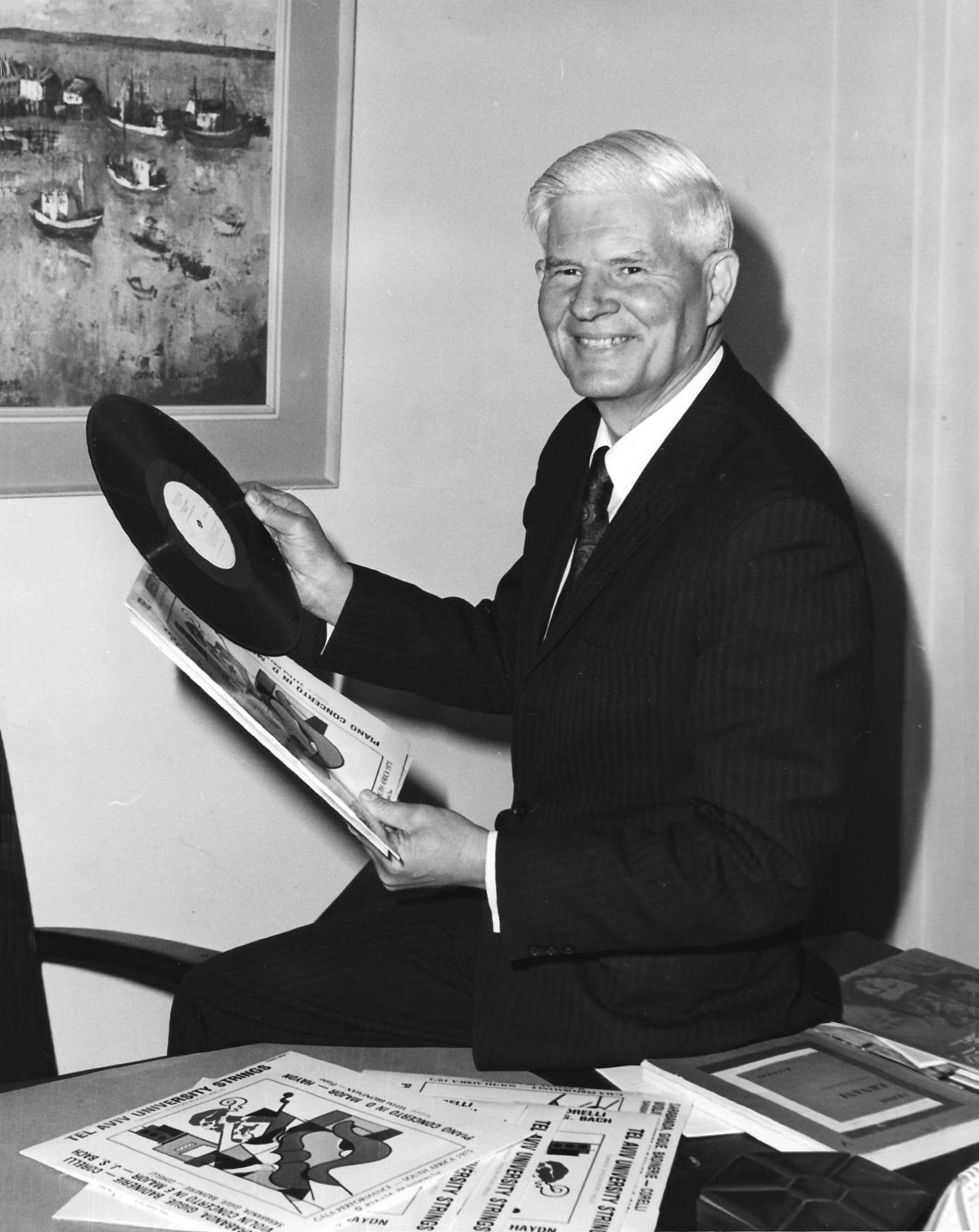
- Hartman selecting records for the SABC broadcast

Background information
- Born: Anton Carlisle Hartman; 26 October 1918; Springs, South Africa
- Died: 3 February 1982 (aged 63) Johannesburg, South Africa
- Years active: 1939–1982

Anton Carlisle Hartman (1918–1982) was a South African conductor. He was head of music and principal conductor at the South African Broadcasting Corporation (SABC) and head of music at the University of the Witwatersrand. He became a central figure in art music in South Africa during the mid 20th century.

== Early life ==
Anton Hartman was the third of six children of a poor family, born at Geduld near Johannesburg in South Africa on 26 October 1918. His father Stephanus Lionel Hartman, a champion marathon runner, was a mine worker, and his mother, Maria Barbara Van Amstel, née Van Ryneveld, a piano teacher. She also played piano accompaniments to the silent movies in the 1920s. Hartman first received piano lessons from his mother when he was about seven years old. He made good progress and was soon playing solo piano works and Lieder accompaniments. His elder sisters were also able singers. The family was keen on their long playing records, the predecessors of CDs, listening again and again to a vast collection of music. As a child and teenager, Anton Hartman was a loyal member of the Voortrekkers, an Afrikaner youth movement that promoted Afrikaner culture and upheld a racist ideology supporting segregation and white supremacy. He became a leader in his commando, helping to instil those exclusionary values in younger members. The organisation remains active today with an emphasis on Christian ethics, personal development and community service, its origins in Afrikaner nationalism and promotion of racist ideology continue to inform its cultural legacy. Hartman obtained the Performer's Licentiate in Piano of the University of South Africa (Unisa) and a BMus degree at the University of the Witwatersrand (Wits) in 1939, Adolph Hallis being his teacher. Aged 21, Hartman started his career at the South African Broadcasting Corporation (SABC) in December 1939 and his first position was that of programme compiler of classical music for the Afrikaans service.

== Achievements ==
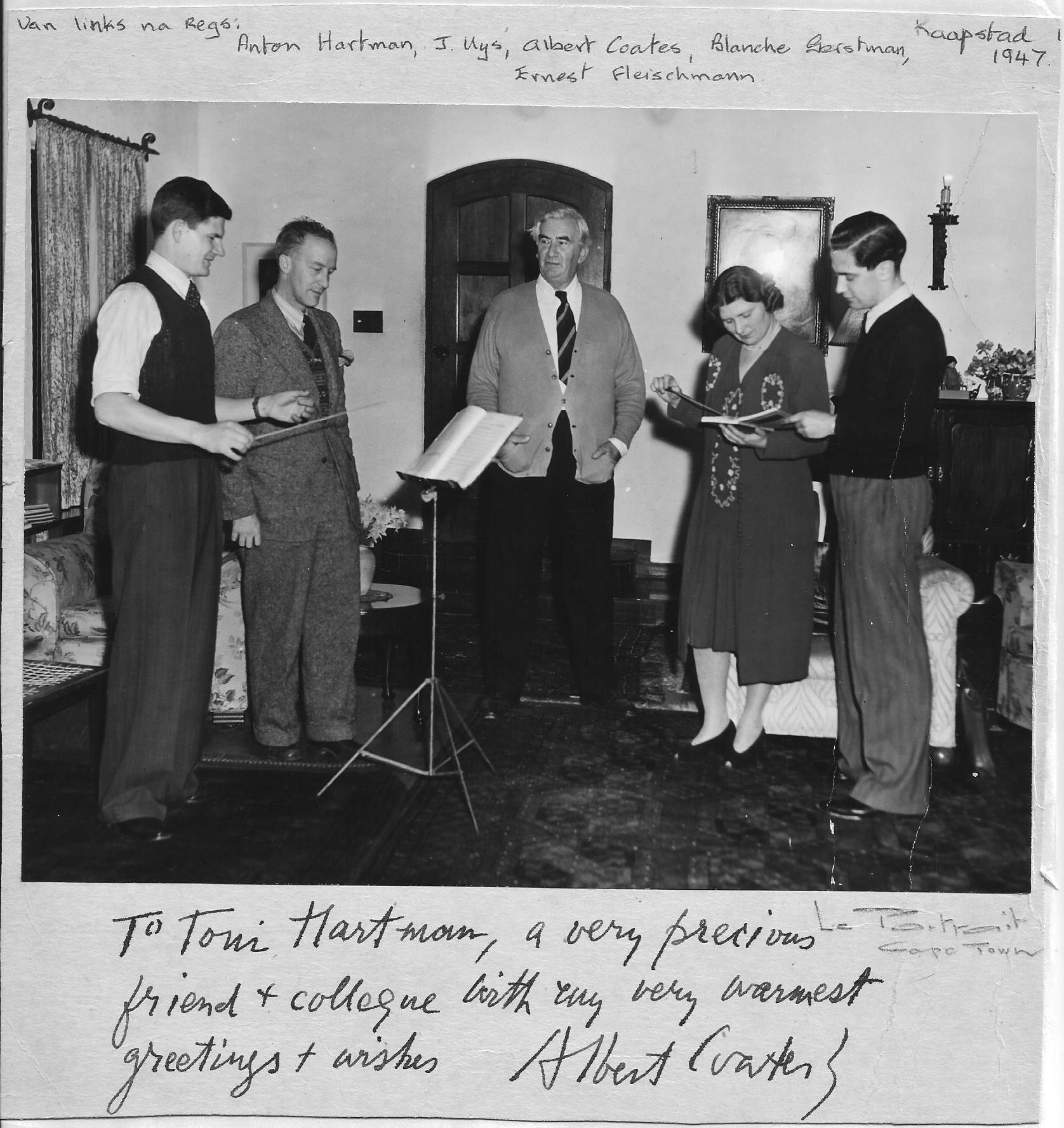
Conducting class. Anton Hartman, Hannes Uys, Albert Coates, Blanche Gerstman, Ernest Fleischmann. (1947)

The SABC environment provided many opportunities to acquaint himself with its symphony orchestra: rehearsals, recordings and concerts, many of which were broadcast live and which were the order of the day. Hartman began to realise that, most of all, he wanted to become a conductor. While temporarily transferred to Cape Town in 1947 he took conducting lessons with Albert Coates, sharing these group lessons with Ernest Fleischman, Blanche Gerstman (composer) and Hannes Uys (the father of Tessa and Pieter Dirk Uys).

In 1948 he was appointed part-time conductor of the Johannesburg Symphony Orchestra and the West Rand Municipal Orchestra of Krugersdorp, both of which were amateur orchestras.

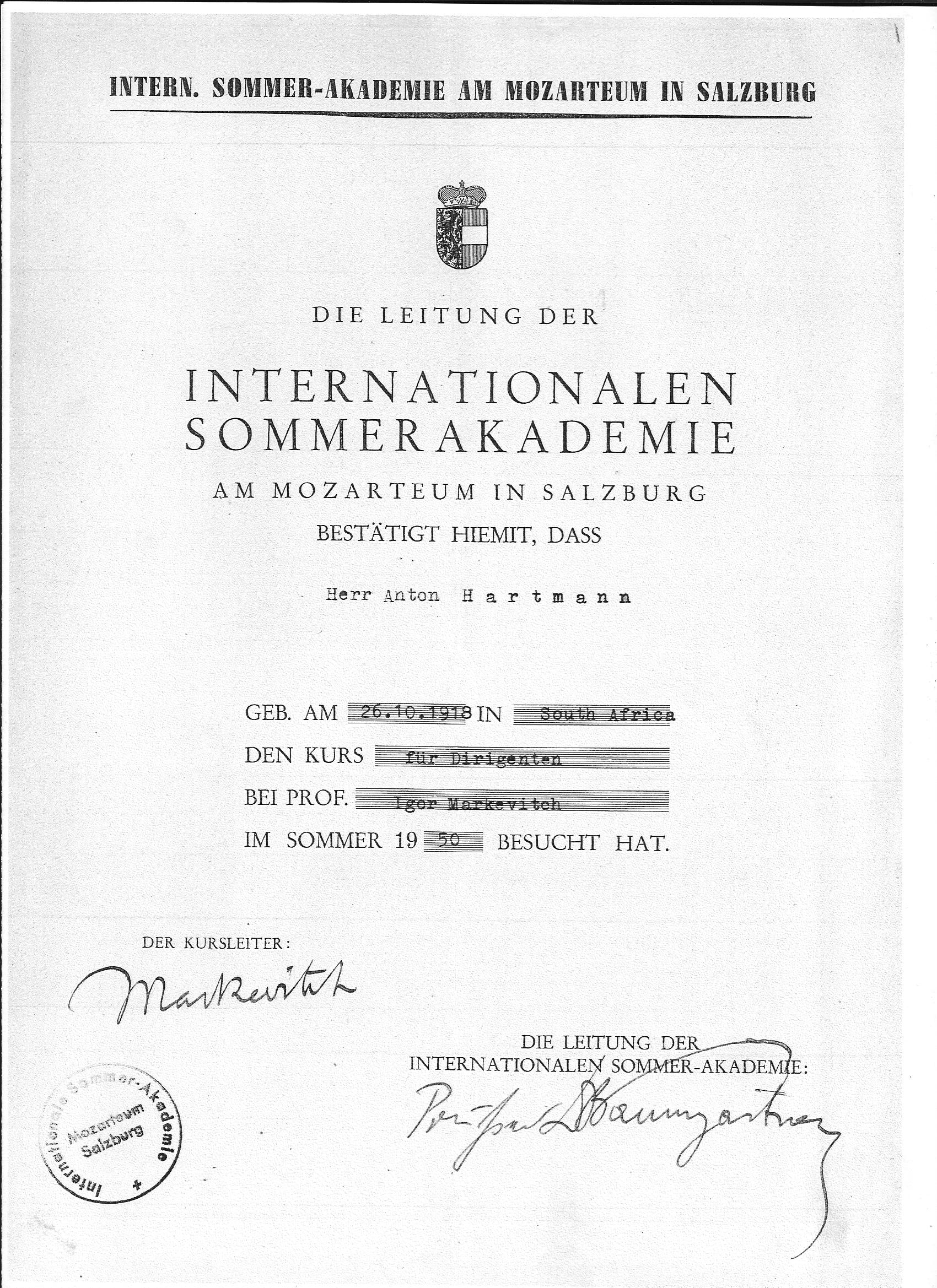
Certificate of attendance of the International Summer Music Academy in Salzburg (1950)

In 1944 he married Josina Wilhelmina (Jossie) Boshoff, a singer whom he first met as a secretary at the SABC. Hartman was awarded the Melanie Pollak Scholarship and Union Post Graduate Scholarship which enabled him to study abroad. Having obtained study leave from the SABC, he and Jossie left for Europe in 1949. Vienna became a second home where his conducting teachers included Felix Prohaska (conductor of the Vienna State Opera) and Clemens Krauss for close on two years. His other teachers were Felix Petyrek (composition), Renate Lang (piano) and Oskar Fitz (violin and viola). Jossie's singing teacher was Maria Hittorf. During the summer holidays of 1950 and 1951 Hartman attended the International Summer Academy courses at the Mozarteum in Salzburg with teacher Igor Markevitch, at which he excelled. Markevitch invited the South African to be his assistant at the courses of 1953 and 1955. The latter event saw a very young Daniel Barenboim as one of Hartman's students. In Salzburg he met Wolfgang Sawallisch who became a lifelong friend. Austria was where his skills, know-how and tastes were refined. He attended many rehearsals and performances conducted by the great names of the time. Karl Böhm, Otto Klemperer, Erich Kleiber, Rafael Kubelik, Rudolf Moralt, Wilhelm Furtwängler, Hans Knappertsbusch and Herbert von Karajan were on his list of admired maestri, whereas he found Leopold Stokowski's theatrical mannerisms outrageous.

Upon his return to South Africa late in 1951 Hartman was appointed assistant conductor at the SABC, alongside Jeremy Schulman and Edgar Cree. His first live broadcast with the SABC Orchestra was on 15 November 1951, Beethoven's Third Symphony (the Eroica) being presented as the main work on the programme. Renowned visiting American pianist Andor Foldes performed with the SABC under his baton in 1953. Hartman added his voice to the plea for a bigger symphony orchestra which could perform and broadcast a wider range of music. This became a reality in 1954 when the orchestra amalgamated with the Johannesburg City Orchestra.

== Career ==
The Federasie van Afrikaanse Kultuurvereniginge (FAK), translated Federation of Afrikaans cultural societies, was founded in 1929. Hartman had already served on the dynamic music committee of the FAK since 1944. In 1955 he was appointed head of this committee, a position he retained until 1981. Over the following decades Hartman and his committee made significant strides in producing popular Afrikaans song books, presenting courses for school music, arranging competitions for choirs and awarding bursaries for deserving musicians.

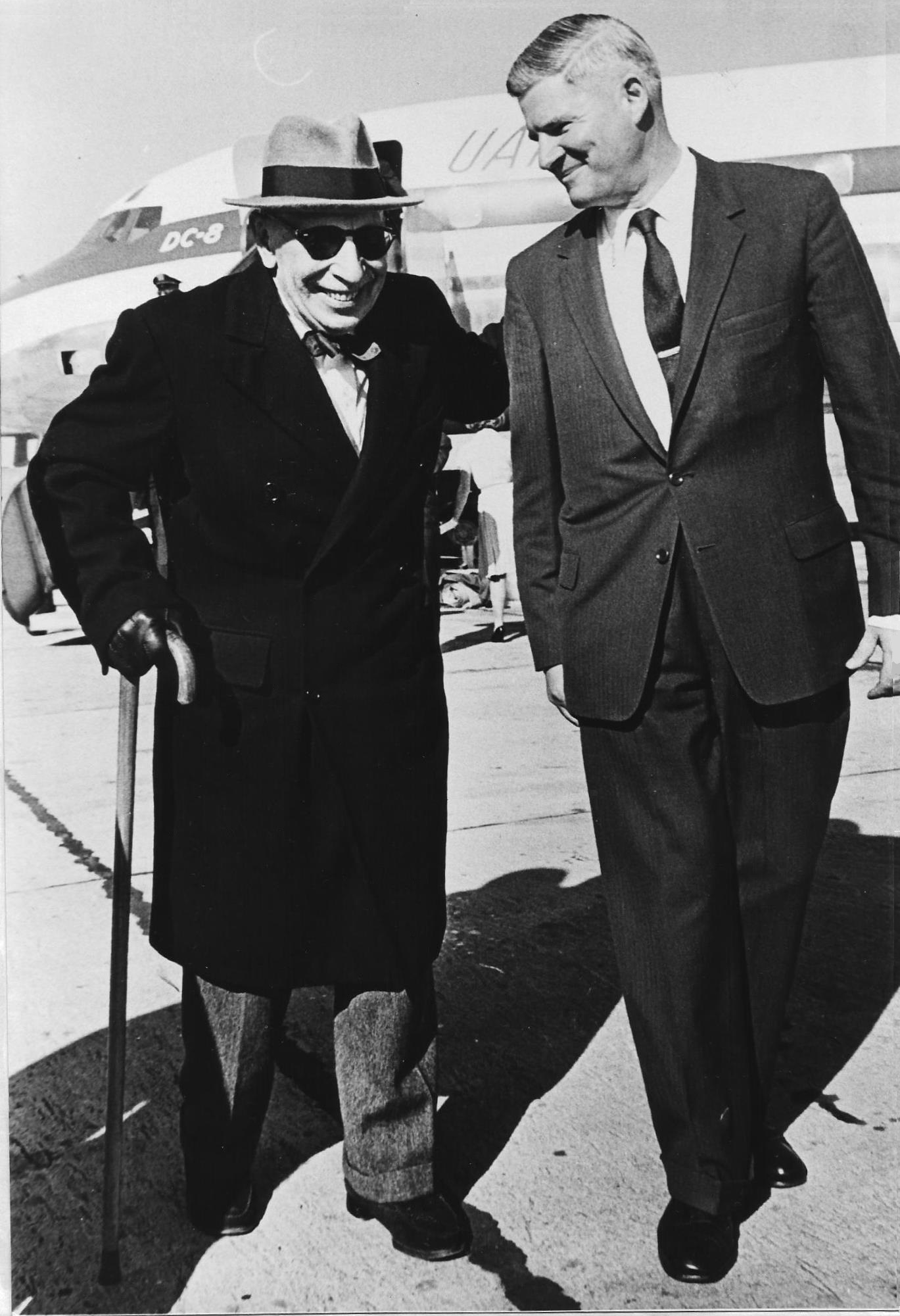
Hartman meets Igor Stravinsky at the Johannesburg international airport (1962)

In 1960 Hartman was appointed head of music at the SABC, a newly created position. This resulted in a scaling down of his conducting load and his being sent to Europe to investigate management models and recruit orchestra players. It was the first of a number of such visits to Europe. Upon his return home he initiated more projects for light music as well as ethnic Afrikaans music (Boeremusiek). For the former projects international artists Mantovani and Jos Cleber were involved. The next two decades Hartman's career at the SABC saw him becoming principal conductor in 1964 and later head of music again in 1967 until 1977. He was a long time friend and associate of Hans Adler (Chairman of the Johannesburg Musical Society, and well known for his keyboard instrument collection and extensive library, later willed to Witwatersrand University, where Hartman had just earlier become head of music) and their co-operation led to many years of concerts and SABC recordings by the finest overseas musicians.

Classical musicians who accepted invitations by the SABC to perform or conduct in South Africa in the sixties and seventies included Radu Aldulescu, Henk Badings, Michel Block, Erling Blondell-Bengtsson, Jorge Bolet, Alfred Brendel, Frederick Brenn, Pierre Boulez, Alfredo Campoli, Edgar Cosma, Robert Craft, Marina de Gabaráin, Monique de la Bruchollerie, Antal Dorati, Phillipe Entremont, Christian Ferras, Arthur Fiedler, Pierre Fournier, Josef Friedland, Erick Friedman, Pierino Gamba, Leonce Gras, Monique Haas, Piet Halsema, Jascha Horenstein, Mindru Katz, Gerald Krug, Louis Lane, Franco Mannino, Dennis Matthews, Ivan Melman, Hans Mommer, Andre Navarra, Rafael Orozco, Franco Patone, Gyorgy Pauk, Edith Peinemann, John Pritchard, Ruggiero Ricci, Witold Rowicki, Malcolm Sargent, Bela Siki, Constantin Silvestri, Abbey Simon, Ruth Slenczynska, Maria Stader, Janos Starker, Daniel Sternefeld, Karlheinz Stockhausen, Igor Stravinsky, Henryk Szering, Bryden Thomas, Sergio Varella-Cid, Tibor Varga, Tamas Vasàry, Heinz Wallberg, Ernst Wallfisch, Daniel Wayenberg, Kurt Wöss, Narciso Yepes (Concert programmes).

Hartman was also committed to presenting South African musicians in SABC broadcasts. Instrumentalists and vocalists were traced through auditions and offered contracts. South African composers were commissioned to compose for broadcasting and be 'discovered'. Stefans Grové, Arnold van Wyk, Hubert du Plessis, Roelof Temmingh and Peter Klatzow featured in this group. His passionate desire to involve the youth in art music flowered into the founding of the South African National Youth Orchestra, in association with the South African Society of Music Teachers. The SABC also had its own Junior Orchestra. The inception in 1970 of the SABC Music Prize for young local performers who wished to pursue a solo career was another brain-child of Hartman's. As a result of Hartman's establishing of the Opera Society of South Africa (OPSA) in 1957, opera productions in Afrikaans increased and local singers performed and shone in their roles. Operas and oratorios were translated into Afrikaans by Hartman himself together with his colleagues.

The SABC Orchestra visited local cities, rural towns and neighbouring countries, Mozambique and South West Africa (today Namibia) to introduce audiences to the genre. Orchestras in Salisbury (today Harare) and Bulawayo in Rhodesia (today Zimbabwe) were conducted by Hartman in 1971, 1973 and 1976. During the 70th anniversary celebrations of the city of Johannesburg in 1956 the London Symphony Orchestra visited the 'City of Gold' and Hartman conducted one of the performances. Hartman was invited to conduct in Europe, in many instances being the first South African to do so. In 1953 he conducted the orchestra at the opening concert at the International Summer Academy in Salzburg. A performance with the radio symphony orchestra of Vienna followed in 1955, as well as with the radio symphony orchestra of the North West German radio in Hamburg in the same year. A recording of works by South Africans John Joubert and Arnold van Wyk was made by the latter orchestra. In 1964 he conducted three concerts in Brussels, Belgium, that were recorded and later broadcast. In August 1966 Hartman was on the outdoor podium with the orchestra of Santa Cecilia in the Forum Romanum in Rome, Italy. More invitations to Italy followed when Hartman was selected as jury member for the Radio Italia Prix in 1969, 1972, and 1976.

== Academic ==
In 1944 Hartman obtained BMus Hons and in 1947 MMus, both with distinction, from the University of the Witwatersrand. The M-thesis is titled 'A Survey of European Music in South Africa, 1652 – 1800'. In 1968 he served on the board of the newly established Rand Afrikaans University (today the University of Johannesburg). The University of Stellenbosch awarded Hartman an honorary degree DMus in 1968 and his alma mater awarded Hartman an honorary degree DMus in 1975. The commendation in the brochure for the occasion read.

‘During his tenure of office as head of Music, the SABC has made considerable efforts to develop the appreciation and performance of serious music among all races in South Africa … He has been the leading musical administrator in South Africa.’

In 1968 Hartman was appointed a full faculty member of the Suid-Afrikaanse Akademie vir Wetenskap en Kuns. In 1978 Hartman left the SABC to take up the post of head of music at the University of the Witwatersrand. Anton Nel was the top piano student there at the time and later pursued an international career as pedagogue and concert pianist. Hartman sought insight into the running of academic music departments and drawing up syllabi. For this purpose he visited eleven institutions in the US, including the Curtis Institute of Music, Eastman School of Music, Oberlin College in Ohio, Cleveland Institute of Music, Akron (university and symphony orchestra), North Carolina School of Arts, Florida State University and the Juilliard School of Music in January 1980. Personalities interviewed by Hartman included John de Lancie, Clayton Krehbiel, Louis Lane (a personal friend) and Dorothy Delay. Delay accepted the invitation to visit South Africa the following year to present master classes. New music courses were subsequently introduced at Wits. Throughout the years numerous articles by Hartman were published in books and journals, including 'History of the music of the Afrikaner'. The South African State Theatre in Pretoria was inaugurated in May 1981. Hartman conducted one of the gala concerts with soloists Mimi Coertse, Evelyn Dalberg, Bernard de Clerk and Deon Van der Walt. Hartman was diagnosed with lymphatic cancer in that year and died on 3 February 1982.

== Role in the Perpetration of Apartheid and Afrikaner Nationalism ==
Afrikaner nationalism was aimed at countering British imperialism in South Africa. It originated in the late 19th century and reached its zenith by about 1975. Tangible until at least the mid 20th century, British imperialism evaporated as Afrikaner nationalism took over. Afrikaner nationalism flourished in the organisations that sprouted from it. The Afrikaner Broederbond (AB, founded in 1918) was one such organisation. In English this can be translated to Brotherhood. It was a 'secret' and powerful Afrikaner men's society that exerted its influence in many spheres. Broederbonders who became prominent in the South African landscape included the industrialist Anton Rupert, poet and playwright N.P. van Wyk Louw, Nobel Peace Prize Winner and Apartheid era president FW de Klerk, and Piet Meyer. Meyer was appointed director-general of the SABC in 1959, the same year that he became chairperson of the AB. According to his diary Hartman, aged 33, was invited to join the AB on 29 February 1952.

Over the next decade, Hartman rose to head of music and principal conductor of the SABC Philharmonic Orchestra, transforming it into the largest ensemble south of the Sahara. He programmed 20th-century art music alongside the traditional classical repertoire, commissioning new works by South African composers and introducing modern compositions—Stravinsky, Stockhausen and others—to local audiences.

Yet Hartman's work unfolded within an institution inseparable from the apartheid state. As a prominent member of the Afrikaner Broederbond, he actively supported a broadcasting system that served only white listeners: concerts, tours and broadcasts were organised exclusively for white communities, while black South Africans were denied access. His commitment to “uplifting” ordinary listeners applied solely to those classified as white under apartheid, effectively cementing the machinery that privileged Afrikaner culture and enforced racial segregation. In doing so, he lent his considerable influence to policies that oppressed non-white citizens: forced removals, restricted access to education and employment, and denial of political rights. At the same time, Afrikaner nationalism imposed its own constraints on white South Africans—particularly those who spoke English or resisted cultural conformity—requiring loyalty to a narrowly defined identity, limiting dissent even among whites and fostering suspicion toward anyone not embraced by the Broederbond's ideals. Though Hartman's musical leadership provided the foundations for South Africa's professional orchestral scene, it did so by upholding a regime that both excluded non-white people and confined white people within the strictures of a nationalist agenda.

== Awards bestowed on Anton Hartman ==
1962: Honorary Medal for Music, by the Suid-Afrikaanse Akademie vir Wetenskap en Kuns 1972: Honorary Member of the South African Society of Music Teachers (SASMT) 1977: Artes Award, SABC 1979: Half Century Memorial Award, by the FAK 1979: Honorary Membership of the Johannesburg Jewish Guild 1982: (Posthumous): A golden Medal of Honour, Erepenning vir Volksdiens by the FAK 1982: (Posthumous): Honorary Medal for the Promotion of Music, by the Suid-Afrikaanse Akademie vir Wetenskap en Kuns

== South African composers whose works were conducted by Anton Hartman ==
W.H. Bell, Richard Cherry, Pieter de Villiers, Hubert du Plessis, David Earl, Gideon Fagan, Johannes Fagan, Blanche Gerstman, Stefans Grové, John Joubert, Pierre Malan, P.R. Kirby, Peter Klatzow, P.J. Lemmer, Rosa Nepgen, Graham Newcater, Stephen O’Reilly, Charles Oxtoby, Priaulx Rainier, Hans Roosenschoon, Henk Temmingh, Roelof Temmingh, Arnold van Wyk, Arthur Wegelin, Theo Wendt.

== Bibliography ==
- Bender, A. [Sa]. Note van herinnering. [Sl]: Watermark printers.
- Dommisse, H. 2001. Long Journey of the heart. Pretoria LAPA.
- FAK (www.fak.org.za). Accessed 2 April 2014.
- Hartman, A.C. 1950. Austria diaries [Sl:sn].
- Hartman, A.C. 1951. Austria diaries [Sl:sn].
- Hartman, A.C. 1952. Johannesburg diary [Sl:sn].
- Hartman, A.C. 1979–80. America diary [Sl:sn].
- Hartman, B. de W. 1985. Dis my storie. [Sl:sn].
- Hartman, B. de W. [Sa]. Jeugjare. Pretoria [Sl:sn].
- Anton Hartman reminisces with musical tour organiser, musicologist and friend Hans Adler.
- Suid-Afrikaanse Akademie vir Wetenskap en Kuns (www.akademie.co.za). Accessed 2 April 2014.
- Theunissen M (ed). 1996. The voice, the vision. A sixty-year history of the South African Broadcasting Corporation. Johannesburg: Advent Graphics.
- Voortrekkers (https://www.houkoers.co.za). Accessed 2 April 2014.
- Walton, Chris 2004. Bond of broeders: Anton Hartman and music in an apartheid state. In: Musical Times Summer 2004 Vol. 145 Number 1887. Musical Times: Middlesex.
