= Blanche Gerstman =

South African composer (1910-1973)

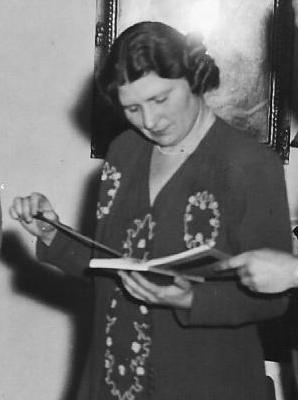
- Gerstman during a conducting class in 1947

Background information
- Born: April 2, 1910; Cape Town, South Africa
- Died: August 11, 1973 (aged 63) Cape Town, South Africa
- Genres: Chamber music, Choral music
- Occupations: Composer, teacher
- Instruments: Piano, double bass
- Works: From the Past, Ode to South Africa

Blanche Gerstman (April 2, 1910—August 11, 1973) was a South African composer who played the piano and double bass. As a young child, she was raised by foster parents who encouraged her study of music. After working as a pianist for the South African Broadcasting Corporation, Gerstman made her debut in 1935 and went on to have a fruitful career. She taught music at the University of Pretoria, played double bass at the Durban Civic Orchestra, and composed around 20 songs.

== Early life ==
Gerstman was born in Cape Town on April 2, 1910. She was raised by foster parents and took their family name when she was 12 years old. She began studying music at the same age, working with British composer Victor Hely-Hutchinson on the topic of harmony. Her first composition was entitled Hellas, and she performed it when she was 18 in 1928.

Gerstman attended the South African College of Music and studied composition from William Henry Bell and piano from Colin Taylor. She became the University of Cape Town's first graduate in the music department.

== Career ==
Gerstman first worked as a radio pianist for the South African Broadcasting Corporation for a decade. Beginning in the 1930s, her compositions gained popularity throughout South Africa. In 1935, Gerstman and her peer Arnold van Wyk made their composer debuts at the Oranje Club in Cape Town.

In 1950, Gerstman became the main double bass player in the Cape Town Municipal Orchestra, but she won the Performing Rights Society Scholarship and left shortly after to travel to London in order to study under Howard Ferguson at the Royal College of Music. She returned to South Africa in 1952 and restarted work as a music teacher at her alma mater.

In 1961, Gerstman began to work at the University of Pretoria, teaching harmony and counterpoint. Two years later, she left the position to join the Durban Civic Orchestra. In 1964, she returned to the South African College of Music for a teaching position. In 1969, she rejoined the Cape Town Municipal Orchestra as a double bass player.

== Later life and legacy ==
Gerstman died in Cape Town on August 11, 1973. She was 63. Two of her most successful and famous works were From the Past and Ode to South Africa, the latter of which was commissioned by the South African Broadcasting Corporation. It is estimated she composed around 24 songs, and at the very least 19.
