= Poerpasledam for flute and piano =

Composition by Arnold van Wyk

Poerpasledam for flute and piano is a work by South African composer Arnold van Wyk (1916–1983), known for its harmonic complexity. The work was originally written as a piano duet in 1944, during World War II, but Van Wyk revisited the piece in 1981, adapting it for flute and piano. The work is now considered an example of Van Wyk's approach to balancing seriousness with playfulness amidst the dire circumstances of war and his longing for his homeland. It is regarded as an important piece in South Africa's classical flute repertoire. The title, Poerpasledam, is an Afrikaans corrupted phrase that translates from the French pour passer le temps, meaning "to pass the time".

== Composer background ==
Arnold van Wyk was born in Calvinia, South Africa, in 1916, into a conservative Afrikaner family. He displayed an early talent for music and received formal training at the University of Cape Town before pursuing advanced studies at the Royal Academy of Music in London. According to music scholar Stephanus Muller, Van Wyk's early life and career were deeply shaped by the hardships he faced as an artist growing up in an increasingly polarized apartheid South Africa. His struggle to create beauty in harsh social environments is a recurring theme in his work, a "hard, stony, flinty path" that would come to define his life and art.

Van Wyk's talent earned him recognition both in South Africa and abroad. His time in London during World War II was particularly formative, as his training in London continued the type of education he had first received in South Africa, a former British colony. Much of his music from this period, including Poerpasledam, reflects the emotional and physical displacement he experienced during the war.

== Composition and original version ==
Van Wyk composed Poerpasledam for piano duet in 1944. Only two known performances of this version were held: The first was at Wigmore Hall in London on 20 February 1945, as part of the Boosey & Hawkes concert series, with Myra Hess and Howard Ferguson as the pianists; Edwin Evans provided the program notes for this performance. The second performance took place at the National Gallery in London on 2 April 1945, during a lunchtime concert, again with Hess and Ferguson as the pianists.

A review of the Wigmore Hall performance, written by Clinton Gray-Fisk, appeared in the April 1945 edition of Musical Opinion. Gray-Fisk praised the piece for its inventiveness, describing it as "diverting, charming, and stimulating"—qualities that he noted made the composition a welcome addition to the piano duet repertoire. Van Wyk himself described Poerpasledam as a "lightish work—about 10–12 minutes—I think you'll like it", in a letter to Freda Baron dated 31 October 1944.

== 1981 flute and piano version ==
Late in 1980, despite a long period of depression, Van Wyk revisited Poerpasledam and adapted it for flute and piano when Éva Tamássy, a flautist and colleague at Stellenbosch University's music department, invited him to embark on a concert tour to South West Africa (present-day Namibia). Although the tour was cancelled, Poerpasledam was subsequently premiered at a Southern Cross Fund concert event in Durbanville on 20 February 1981, thereby once again immersing the work into a setting of conflict, this time the South African Border War.

Howard Ferguson, who played a significant role in supporting Van Wyk's compositions in London and remained a lifelong friend, prepared a printer's copy of the flute and piano version in January 1984, after Van Wyk had died. Ferguson also wrote an editor's introduction to the work, detailing its origins and first performances. This printer's copy has never been published, and it resides in the DOMUS archive at Stellenbosch University, where it has been digitized.
