= Rosa Nepgen =

South African composer (1909–2000)

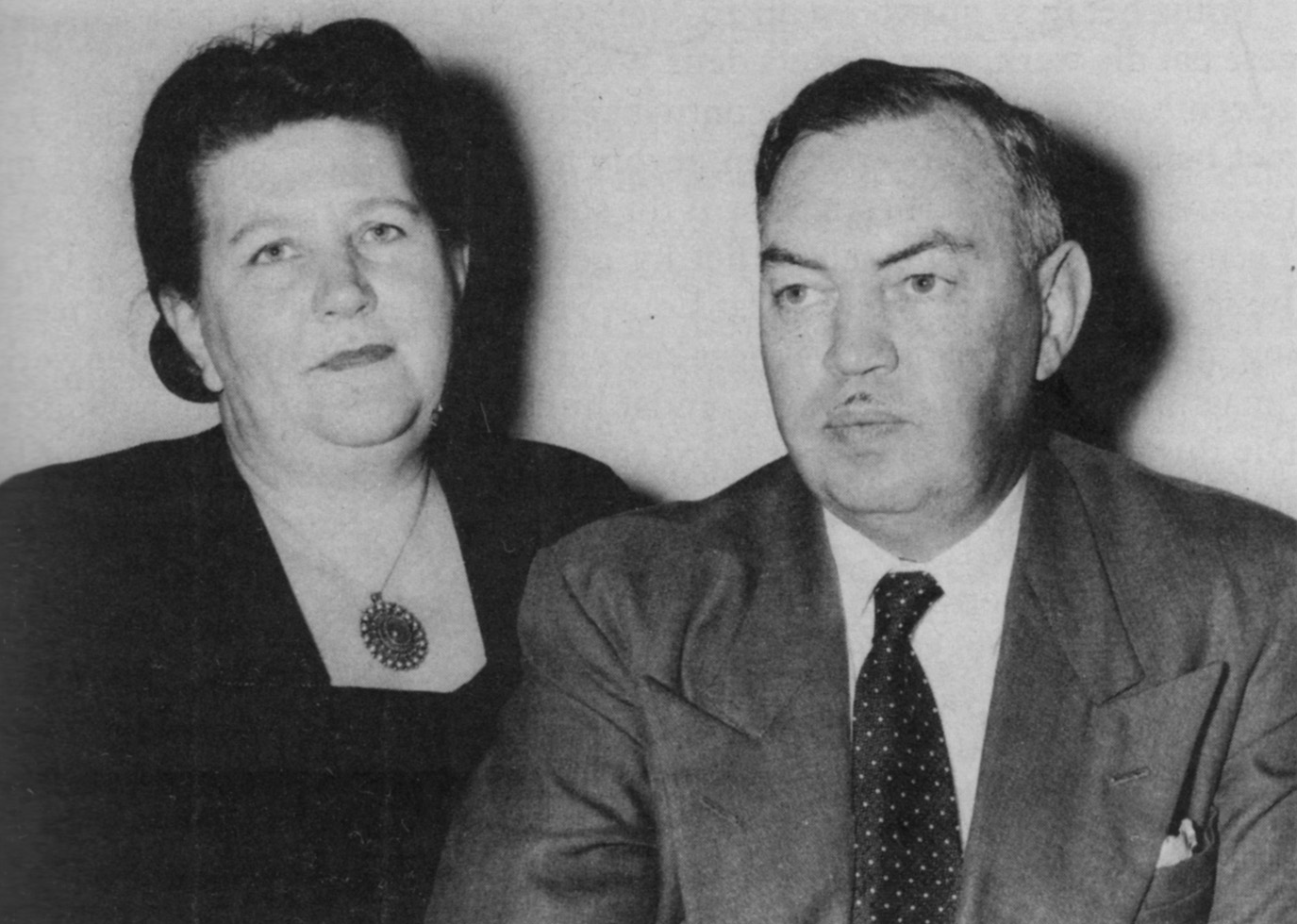
- Nepgen and her husband W.E.G. Louw
- Born: Rosa Sophia Cornelia Nepgen; 12 December 1909; Barkly East
- Died: 14 February 2000 (aged 90); Stellenbosch
- Occupation: composer
- Spouse: W.E.G. Louw

Rosa Sophia Cornelia Nepgen (Barkly East, Cape Colony, 12 December 1909 – Stellenbosch, South Africa, 14 February 2000) was a South African composer. The bulk of her oeuvre consists of settings of Afrikaans poems for voice and piano, including numerous songs with lyrics by her husband, W.E.G. Louw, and his brother the poet N.P. van Wyk Louw.

== Early life, education, and marriage ==
She was the daughter of Johann Nepgen, a barrister in Barkly East, and Millicent Grace Schlemmer, a talented singer, pianist, and violinist. She received piano lessons from her mother at an early age. The family moved to Pretoria in 1912 and to Standerton in 1913. In the latter place she was taught by organist Dirk Meerkotter, but in the meantime she also took lessons with Ellen Norburn at the Pretoria College of Music. This was supplemented with singing and organ lessons with Stephanie Faure. From 1927 onwards, Nepgen studied at the University of the Witwatersrand in the faculties of Music, English, and Ethics. In 1931, she graduated with a B.Mus. She subsequently became a lecturer at the aforementioned university. In 1944, she married Louw, who, besides being a poet, was also a professor of Afrikaans and Dutch at Rhodes University.

== Early composing ==
One of the first works she wrote was the music for the performances of Aristophane's Clouds. She was supported in this by her piano teacher, Horace Barton. A series of songs based on English texts followed, such as those for the miracle play The Three Marys for soloists and chamber orchestra. From 1940 onwards she focused more on Afrikaans texts. While studying the anthology Uit ons digkunst (From Our Digikunst), she became acquainted with the poems of Louw. During this time, she also earned money as (assistant) organist at the Dutch Reformed Church in Melville, a suburb of Johannesburg. In 1944, the couple moved to Grahamstown. Her marriage also allowed her to immerse herself in Dutch poetry.

== Move to Cape Town and journeys in Europe ==
In 1957, the family moved to Cape Town, where her husband tried to elevate the magazine Die Burger, particularly in the arts. Nepgen took charge of the book department. She began singing in the choir Goeie Hoop, where she was able to immerse herself in repertoire ranging from the Middle Ages to contemporary music. During those years, she regularly attended concerts of the Cape Symphony Orchestra and made musical journeys to Europe. There, she briefly apprenticed with the Flemish Flor Peeters (1949) and Ernest Willem Mulder and Peter Frankl of the Amsterdam Conservatory . She developed lasting friendships with composer Henk Badings, musicologist and critic Eduard Reeser, and singers Laurens Bogtman and Annie Woud. She also visited Italy with her husband, learned the language, and together with her husband wrote an Afrikaans version of Georg Friedrich Handel's Messiah, which was published by Novello. In Italy she met composer Luigi Dallapiccola and poet Eugenio Montale, whose work she would translate and set to music.

== At Stellenbosch ==
In 1966, her husband was appointed professor at the University of Stellenbosch, and the Louw-Nepgen family moved there. That same year, she wrote her "Psalter, met hart en mond" (Psalter with Heart and Mouth), based on Afrikaans translations of the psalms of Totius. She remained active in all areas, earning her an award from the South African Academy of Science and Art in 1980. She died on February 14, 2000, in Stellenbosch at the age of 90.

== Works ==
Nepgen's oeuvre was a victim of her self-criticism. Although she wrote approximately 300 songs, she continually tinkered with them, so that most remained in manuscript form; only a few made it to the printing press. Her instrumental works include the Fugal Fantasy (1937), a sonata (1937), and a single orchestral work: Vroeë aand, also from 1937. Seven collections were published under the title Die liedere van Rosa Nepgen. Along with Priaulx Rainier and Blanche Gerstman, she is considered one of the most important female composers in South Africa of the 20th century.
