= Little Theatre (Cape Town) =

Performing arts centre in South Africa

- Interactive map of Little Theatre
- Address: 37 Orange St; Cape Town City Centre; Cape Town; South Africa
- Coordinates: 33°55′48″S 18°24′51″E
- Owner: University of Cape Town

Construction
- Opened: 18 August 1931

Website
- www.ctdps.uct.ac.za/CTDPS/Facilities

The Little Theatre Complex consists of three theatres in a building located on the University of Cape Town's Hiddingh campus on Orange Street in Cape Town. The Little Theatre, the main theatre in the building, is actually the largest providing seating for 240 people. The other two theatres, the Arena and Intimate theatres, can seat 70-80 people. The theatre complex is adjacent to the fine arts and drama departments at the University of Cape Town.

== History ==
Originally a chemistry laboratory, the Little Theatre was opened in 1931 as a venue to house drama and opera productions. The theatre was founded by William Henry Bell, Dean of the College of Music who personally financed the lighting equipment for the theatre. This was seen as an experimental space and had a stage as large as the auditorium, seating only 194 people. The theatre was inaugurated on 18 August 1931 with a production of Anton Chekov’s The Seagull (directed by W.A Sewell). The first Opera held at the Little Theatre was Cimarosa’s Secret Marriage in 1933. Following the success of Bernard Shaw's The Apple Cart in 1933, the press canvassed for the rebuilding of the auditorium. The refurbished theatre was opened with Mozart’s The Marriage of Figaro in 1934. The new theatre was built on the continental seating plan, with continuous rows with only side isles, giving spectators an uninterrupted view of the whole stage, and could now seat 300 people. In order to promote theatre in Cape Town, the theatre was made available to any dramatic society in the city free of charge, although all proceeds went to the theatre. Subsequently it became the ‘home’ of the Cape Town Repertory Theatre Society between 1934 and 1948. The theatre moved to the professional era in 1937 with André Van Gyseghem's production of Bernard Shaw’s Man and Superman in 1937. The theatre began to host a club of professional theatre practitioners known as 'the Theatre Club' under Rollo Gamble. When Gamble returned to the UK the Theatre Club broke up, but Leontine Sagan was convinced to undertake a residency at the theatre. During the Second World War Noël Coward visited the theatre and gave a performance to servicemen and women. In the 1950s the theatre began to forge a closer relationship with the University's Drama Department, leading to a break with the College of Music.

In 1952, during the 300-year celebration of Jan Van Riebeecks' arrival in the Cape, the Little Theatre put on Ivor Jones’ The Ball at the Castle in an open-air presentation at the Castle in Cape Town. In the 1950s the theatre hosted actors from the Flemish National Theatre in Antwerp under the leadership of Fred Engelen and his wife Tine Balder. Engelen was subsequently appointed as Professor in Drama at Stellenbosch University. The relationship with Engelen led to closer ties with European theatres. When Engelen produced D.F. Malherbe’s version of Shakespeare’s The Merchant of Venice, Mavis Taylor’s costume designs were used in follow up productions in Antwerp. At this time the Little Theatre's workshops caught fire and over 21 years of collected costumes were destroyed as well as workshop gear, tools, and spaces for used for teaching or as officed. The decision was made to reconstruct the drama school and the workshop roof was raised, teaching studios were made more spacious and a proper broadcasting training set-up was constructed.

To celebrate the 400th Anniversary of Shakespeare's birth in 1964 the British Council helped the Little Theatre to bring out the noted English director Norman Marshall to direct Shakespeare’s Romeo and Juliet.
