= South African College of Music =

Department of the Faculty of Humanities at the University of Cape Town

Coordinates: 33°57′23″S 18°28′12″E

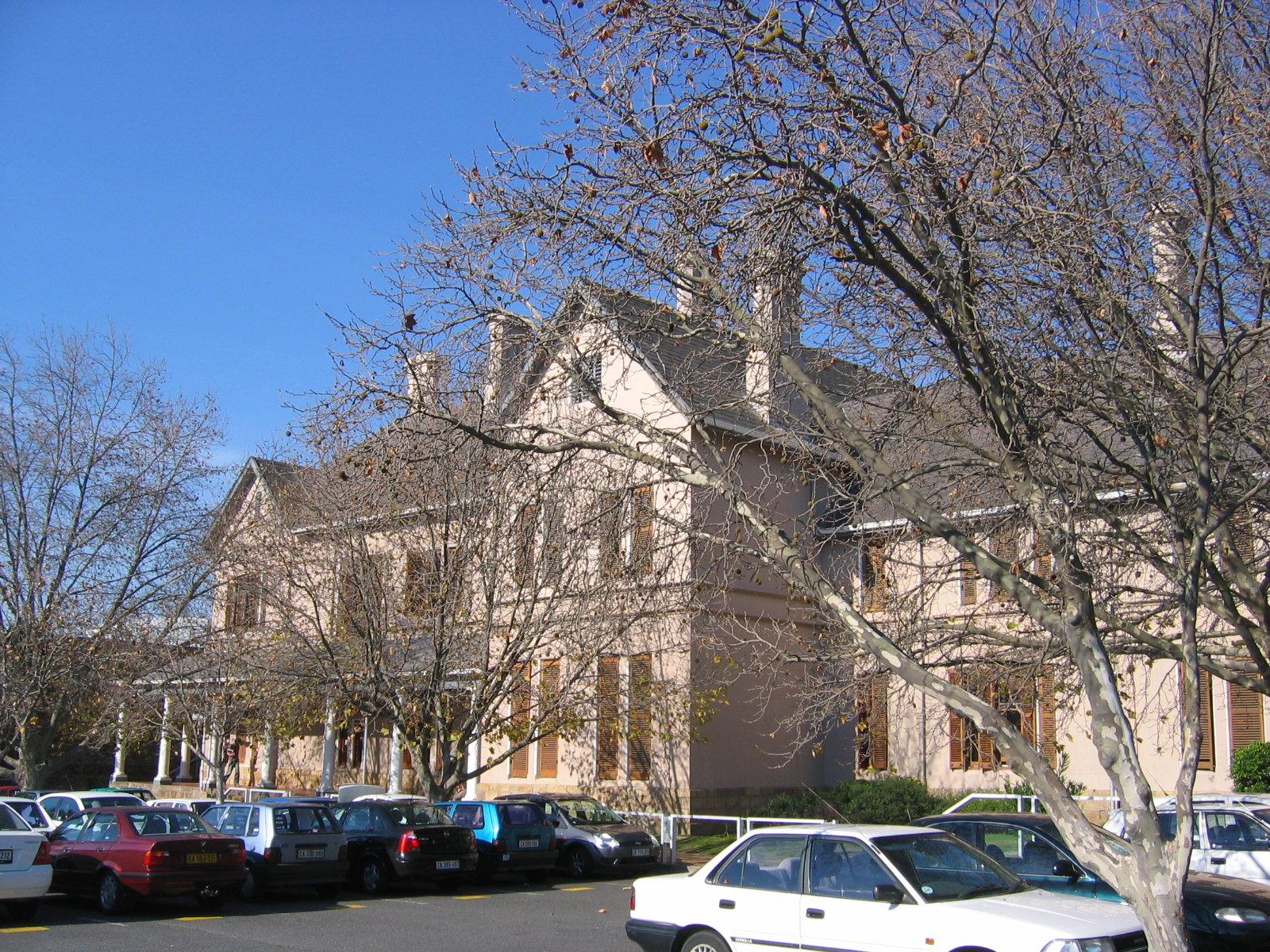
Strubenholm, home of the SA College of Music

The South African College of Music, abbreviated as SACM, is a department of the Faculty of Humanities at the University of Cape Town. It is located on the university's Lower Campus in Rondebosch, Cape Town.

== History ==
The South African College of Music was founded by a group of musicians led by Madame Apolline Niay-Darroll and opened in 1910 in Strand Street, Cape Town, with six students. In 1912 Mr William Henry Bell was appointed Principal and, in 1914, the SACM moved to larger premises in Stal Plein.

In 1920 Mr Bell was made Professor of Music at the University of Cape Town, where he held classes for degree courses. In 1923 the SACM was incorporated into the university and Professor Bell became dean of the Faculty of Music. In 1999 the Faculty of Music was absorbed into the Faculty of Humanities.

Strubenholm, previously the private residence in Rosebank of Henry Struben, has been home to the SACM since 1925. It now houses administrative offices and lecture rooms as well as an exhibition hall for the world-renowned Kirby Collection of African, European and Asian instruments.

Two new buildings, linked to Strubenholm, were completed at the end of 1972. These contain the 160-seat Chisholm Recital Room; an opera studio, the Fiasconaro Room; nearly 100 teaching studios and practising rooms; and the W.H. Bell Music Library, which houses a range of reference and text books, periodicals, scores and records. In addition there are recording and electronic music studios and a listening laboratory.

The 638-seat Concert Hall in the adjacent Baxter Theatre Centre, with its Von Beckerath organ, is an important performing and teaching venue for the SACM.

== Study opportunities ==
The South African College of Music offers training in a range of orchestral instruments, piano, voice, African music and jazz. The college boasts several string, wind, jazz and percussion ensembles as well as choirs, a symphony orchestra and a big band. In addition the Opera School annually presents a season of opera performances. All students are required either to play in the orchestras or bands or sing in the choirs, at the discretion of the director.

Students who complete diploma or degree courses are ready to enter the profession of music either as teachers, singers or instrumentalists in Western classical music, jazz or African music and dance. Careers open to diplomates and graduates include orchestral playing, opera and oratorio singing, programme compiling for broadcasting networks, librarianship, performance, and education.

The wide range of postgraduate programmes offered includes: ethnomusicology; performance studies in Western classical music, African music and jazz; musicology (theory and history); and composition.

== Notable alumni and faculty ==
=== Notable alumni ===
- Cromwell Everson (1925–1991), composer
- Robert Fokkens, composer
- Malcolm Forsyth (1936–2011), trombonist, composer
- Stefans Grové (1922–2014), composer
- Hendrik Hofmeyr (born 1957), composer
- John Joubert (1927–2019), composer
- Eddie Kramer (born 1942), recording producer
- Galt MacDermot (1928–2018), composer
- Ike Moriz (born 1972), musician
- Vuvu Mpofu, soprano
- Dizu Plaatjies, musician
- Priaulx Rainier (1903–1986), composer
- Judith Sephuma (born 1974), jazz singer
- John Tyrrell (1942–2018), musicologist
- Peter van der Merwe, musicologist
- Marcus Wyatt (born 1971), musician
- Pretty Yende (born 1985), opera soprano
- Conrad Asman (born 1996), composer

=== Notable staff ===
- Erik Chisholm (1904–1965), composer
- Lamar Crowson (1926–1998), pianist
- Hubert du Plessis (1922–2011), composer
- Stanley Glasser (1926–2018), composer
- Peter Klatzow (1945–2021), composer
- Brian Priestman (1927–2014), conductor
- Thomas Rajna (1928–2021), pianist, composer
- Barry Smith (born 1939), organist
- Ronald Stevenson (1928–2015), composer
- Arnold van Wyk (1916–1983), composer
