= Frederick Dalberg =

Opera singer

- Born: Frederick Dalrymple; 7 January 1907; Newcastle-upon-Tyne, England
- Died: 9 May 1988 (aged 81); Cape Town, South Africa
- Occupation: Opera singer

Frederick Dalberg (7 January 1907 – 9 May 1988) was an English-born South African opera bass. As an ensemble member of the Leipzig Opera, Bavarian State Opera, Covent Garden and Mannheim National Theatre, he excelled in German romantic operas, especially those by Richard Wagner, but also took part in several premieres of contemporary compositions.

== Life and career ==
He was born Frederick Dalrymple on 7 January 1907 in Newcastle-upon-Tyne, England. His family emigrated to South Africa in 1920, where he sang in the choir of Pretoria Cathedral as boy and man.

He studied at the Dresden Conservatory in Germany. Having Germanised his name to "Friedrich Dalberg", he made his debut in 1931 as Monterone in Rigoletto at the Leipzig Opera where he also sang Sarastro in The Magic Flute, Osmin in Die Entführung aus dem Serail, Henry the Fowler in Lohengrin and several other Wagner roles. He appeared in Munich, Dresden, Vienna and Berlin, where he also spent the war years. Dalberg sang at the Bayreuth Festival (1942–44 and 1951), taking the parts of Fafner in Das Rheingold and Hagen in Götterdämmerung. In the post-war years he was engaged at the Bavarian State Opera in Munich. In 1949 he visited South Africa for a guest appearance which was not agreed with the Munich opera director's office.

Dalberg joined the company of the Royal Opera House, Covent Garden, London in 1951. There he created roles in two Benjamin Britten operas, John Claggart in Billy Budd (1951), and Sir Walter Raleigh in Gloriana (1953). He was in the British stage première of Alban Berg's Wozzeck (1952) as well as the debut casts of William Walton's Troilus and Cressida (1954) and Michael Tippett's The Midsummer Marriage (1955). In addition, his repertoire included King Mark in Tristan und Isolde, Hunding in Die Walküre, Caspar in Der Freischütz, Don Pizarro in Fidelio, Sparafucile in Rigoletto and Bartolo in The Marriage of Figaro. In 1957, he returned to Germany, accepting an engagement at the Mannheim National Theatre, which he retained until his retirement in 1970. There, he appeared as Daland in The Flying Dutchman and Gurnemanz in Parsifal as well as the title role in Boris Godunov. In 1961 he created Cousin Brandon in Paul Hindemith's The Long Christmas Dinner.

He died in Cape Town in May 1988.

== Personal life ==
He married German soprano Ellen Winter. Their daughter, Evelyn Dalberg, was also an opera singer in South Africa.
