= Vuvu Mpofu =

- Born: Noluvuyiso Mpofu; 1990 or 1991 (age 35–36); Port Elizabeth, South Africa
- Occupation: Soprano

Noluvuyiso "Vuvu" Mpofu is a South African operatic soprano.

== Education ==
Mpofu comes from a musical family, but had no exposure to opera until age 15 when she heard a Mozart aria at a school concert.

She was initially self-taught, learning by mimicking the performers on two opera DVDs, The Magic Flute and La Traviata, which she watched repeatedly as a teenager; she was especially impressed by Angela Gheorghiu's Violetta in the latter. Before she could sing opera, she already entered herself into a singing competition.

Despite initial resistance by her family, she went on to complete her formal music education at the South African College of Music in Cape Town, at both undergraduate and postgraduate levels.

== Recognition ==
Mpofu finished third in the 2015 edition of the Operalia competition.

She also reached the final and won the audience prize in the 2015 International Hans Gabor Belvedere Singing Competition, and finished second in the same competition the following year.

In 2019, she received the John Christie Award from the Worshipful Company of Musicians.

Chris Ruel, writing for OperaWire, described her as "one in a million".

== Career ==
Her notable roles to date have included Gilda in Rigoletto at Glyndebourne (2019); Pamina in The Magic Flute at Opera North (2019), in which she was described as having "sumptuous tone and exquisite phrasing"; and Musetta in La bohème at the English National Opera (2024).

She has special affinity for the role of Violetta in La Traviata, which she has performed in multiple productions, including at Cape Town Opera (2015), Theater St. Gallen (2022), Seattle Opera (2023), and Pittsburgh Opera (2024).
