= Jane Eyre (Joubert) =

Jane Eyre is an opera in three acts, Op. 134, by John Joubert to a libretto by Kenneth Birkin after the 1847 novel by Charlotte Brontë. The opera was written from 1987 until 1997. The world premiere of the revised version took place on 25 October 2016 at the Ruddock Performing Arts Centre in Birmingham, England.

It was first fully staged at the Arcola Theatre in London in 2025.

== Recording ==
- Jane Eyre, April Fredrick (soprano) as Jane and David Stout (baritone) as Rochester. Somm.
