= Arnold van Wyk =

- Born: Arnoldus Christiaan Vlok van Wyk; April 26, 1916; Calvinia, Cape Province, Union of South Africa
- Died: March 27, 1983 (aged 66) Stellenbosch, Cape Province, Republic of South Africa
- Years active: 1940–1983

Arnoldus Christiaan Vlok van Wyk (26 April 1916 – 27 March 1983) was a South African art music composer, one of the first notable generation of such composers along with Hubert du Plessis and Stefans Grové. Despite the strict laws imposed by the Apartheid government during his lifetime, van Wyk's homosexuality was ignored by the authorities throughout his career due to the nationalistic nature of his music.

== Early life ==
Arnoldus Christiaan Vlok van Wyk was born on 26 April 1916 on the farm Klavervlei, not far from Calvinia, a small town in the Northern Cape province of South Africa. He was the sixth of eight children. His mother, Helena van Dyk, came from a wealthy family seemingly descended from the seventeenth century court painter Anthony van Dyck. The couple married when farming provided reasonable hopes of financial security, however Van Wyk's father was never an efficient manager of the business. Little is known about his childhood other than that life was difficult. From as early as 1918, the family struggled financially, his father Arnoldus Christiaan Vlok van Wyk abused his wife and children. Several members of the family, including Van Wyk's mother and eldest sisters, demonstrated musical talent but had little opportunity for musical education.

== Musical education ==
Van Wyk took occasional piano lessons from his 'favourite" sister Minnie and soon he was "improvising dramatic piano illustrations of stories told by anyone soft-hearted enough to pay him sixpence." At 16, Van Wyk was sent to boarding school at Stellenbosch Boys' High School in Stellenbosch. He took piano lessons first from the cellist Hans Endler and later from Miss C.E. van der Merwe. His mother died in Somerset Hospital in Cape Town, followed a few weeks later by the death of his eldest sister. He matriculated at the age of seventeen and decided to spend the next year preparing for an overseas piano scholarship, an effort that proved unsuccessful. He took a job in Cape Town in the claims department at an insurance company. During this time, he made contact with Charles Weich, music critic of the Afrikaans newspaper Die Burger, who invited him to perform for the first time at a concert of works "by unknown South African composers" hosted by the Oranjeklub. It brought an audience to Van Wyk's works and provided the young composer with a voice.

== London apprenticeship ==
In 1938, Van Wyk began studies aimed at a BA-degree at the University of Stellenbosch. He interrupted his studies to study at the Royal Academy of Music in London. He was the first South African composer to receive a Performing Right Scholarship to study there, initially granted for one academic year. Van Wyk received permission to continue his studies there until 1944. While studying at the Royal Academy, Van Wyk received many prizes, including the 1941 Worshipful Company of Musicians Medal, awarded to the most distinguished student in the Academy. Van Wyk had many concerns about his first professional training from his composition teacher, Theodore Holland. After a few months at the Royal Academy, Van Wyk wrote in a letter:

This evening after I had done some decent practicing, I played some of my earlier pieces—the "Nocturne," the "Bagatelles," the "Romanza" & "Mazurka" and this has put me in a nice, blue sentimental mood. It would be natural to write a blue letter, with purple moments & mauve cadences, but I'll do my best not to inflict this on you. Contact with the English has taught me the indecency of emotion; has taught me that naked emotion is as unforgivable as walking down the street without one's pants. I have as yet not decided whether I am a better man now that I have assimilated this philosophy.

During Van Wyk's time at the Royal Academy, his works were performed at several student concerts, including his Violin Concerto, conducted by Sir Henry Wood and performed by fellow student Doreen Cordell in 1940. To supplement his income, Van Wyk took a job at the recently formed Afrikaans section of the BBC, where he worked as announcer, translator, deviser of programmes, and newsreader, for the remainder of his time in London. Through this BBC appointment he met British composer and musicologist Howard Ferguson, who was "immensely impressed by [the] beauty and originality" of his works. A lifelong relationship developed from this meeting and resulted in performances of several of Wyk's works on stages throughout the United Kingdom during his eight-year stay there.

The first of these public performances included Van Wyk's "Five Elegies for String Quartet", performed as part of the well-known National Gallery Concerts. Other works performed included his two piano-duet works, "Three Improvisations on Dutch Folksongs," and the variations entitled "Poerpasledam", an Afrikaans corruption of the French "pour passer le temps). Other works performed during Van Wyk's stay in England were of his First Symphony, also conducted by Sir Henry Wood, as part of a special BBC broadcast on South Africa's Union Day celebrations in 1943, and the Saudade for violin and orchestra, originally the middle movement of the Violin Concerto, performed by violinist Olive Zorian at an Albert Hall Promenade Concert conducted by Sir Adrian Boult.

Some critics questioned Van Wyk's popularity with English audiences and argued that the BBC promoted his works as part of its larger campaign on behalf of the Afrikaners who formed part of the Allied Forces of World War II.

Wyk returned to South Africa in 1946 following the end of the Second World War.

== Return to South Africa ==
When Van Wyk returned to South Africa in early December 1946 "he received a heart-warming welcome". His return prompted an interest in contributing to South African art music, motivated by nationalist concerns. During the next couple of years Wyk worked as a freelance composer and musician and made several tours of piano recitals throughout the Union of South Africa, a concert series organised by the then Reddingsdaadbond, an organisation established in 1939 to promote and invest in cultural projects throughout the Union. The concerts were designed to cultivate classical music appreciation among rural Afrikaners.

== Musical nationalism ==
Numerous music critics have questioned the "nationalistic style" that appears in van Wyk's works. At a public lecture in 1955 for the Commonwealth section of the Royal Society of Arts, critic Stewart Hylton-Edwards pointed out that Van Wyk would not be capable "to write English music to the end of his days". Another argues that Van Wyk felt exploited by the nationalists and that they were only concerned with his contribution to the cultivation process of South African Art Music. Van Wyk especially disliked his connections with the South African Broadcasting Corporation (SABC), which frequently commissioned works from him and presented him with his only broadcasting opportunities.

In South Africa Van Wyk continued working on his "Kersfees Kantata" (Christmas Cantata), a work he had begun composing in London that promised him financial security with yearly state-sponsored broadcasts. To avoid any further connections with the Afrikaner Nationalists, Van Wyk accepted an appointment as lecturer in Music at the English-speaking University of Cape Town, a post that "promised security while allowing some time for composition and piano playing". He completed his Second Symphony (Sinfonia Ricercata) during this time, a work commissioned for the 1952 Van Riebeeck Festival, as well as his orchestral work "Rapsodie" (1951).

Several scholars argue that Van Wyk's songs represent his finest work. Following his Rhapsody came an important song-cycle "Van Liefde en Verlatenheid", praised by critic Malcolm Rayment as "one of the most important contributions of our time to the literature of songs". The first performance of "Van Liefde en Verlatenheid" took place at the University of Cape Town Music Festival in 1953. Van Wyk briefly returned to London during 1954–56 for a series of concerts. During this time he worked primarily on a large-scale piano work "Nagmusiek" in memory of his friend Noel Mewton-Wood, the Australian-born pianist who committed suicide in 1953.

Although Van Wyk composed simply because he wanted to create "beautiful things," his connection to the ideologies of Afrikaner Nationalism was unavoidable. For the Union Festival in Bloemfontein in 1960 Van Wyk wrote one of his most important works up to that time, the symphonic suite "Primavera", important for its length as well as its prominence among his orchestral works. It comprises four movements played without interruption, of which the third movement makes extensive use of a minnelied, as used by the thirteenth-century German poet Neidhart von Reuenthal.

Toward the end of his career Van Wyk was attracted by the idea of composing unaccompanied vocal works, such as his "Aanspraak virrie latenstyd" (1973–83) and his "Missa in illo tempore" (1979). He told an interviewer: "At the moment this is the thing that stirs me the most; the idea of people singing without instruments. Maybe it has something to do with where the world is going."

== Prominence ==
During 1952 Van Wyk was made a Fellow of the Royal Academy and made several trips to Europe. Important performances outside of the UK and South Africa included a performance of his "Eerste Strykkwartet" (First String Quartet) in Brussels for the International Society for Contemporary Music in 1950 and a performance of his song-cycle "Van liefde en Verlatenheid" during the society's 1954 festival in Israel. During this festival van Wyk received the Jeunesses Musicales Prize. The performance of his song-cycle at the festival was so well received that it was performed on several occasions that same year in the Netherlands, London, and Oslo. Van Wyk was made Honorary Doctor of Music by the University of Cape Town in 1972 and by the University of Stellenbosch in 1981.

== Compositional style and development ==
Despite the acknowledgements and critical acclaim Van Wyk received during his lifetime for his works, he would never conquest his self-critical voice; consequently the majority of Van Wyk's works were often revised after its first performance. In total, excluding the revised works, Van Wyk composed a mere twenty-seven compositions during his lifetime. Van Wyk's most fundamental stylistic developments took shape in Europe during his early youth. As did many of Van Wyk's contemporaries of the time, he felt that the stature of any composer, and more importantly, a composer from South Africa, had to be measured by the European landscape of artistic merit and aesthetic values. Of his work ethic, Howard Ferguson said: "He is a slow and meticulous worker, also extremely self-critical, as can be seen from his habit of revising works after their first performance, or even withdrawing them altogether. Indeed one sometimes wonders whether he is not apt to be too self-critical".

Van Wyk's first musical idioms reflected late Romantic musical traditions and is tonal and 'neo-Romantic'. Van Wyk was aware of the stylistic limitations of his own music, but also followed the so-called 'post-modern' European compositional developments, with composers such as Hindemith, Stravinsky, and Schoenberg.

During a SAUK-interview in 1972, Van Wyk explained the following:

Baiekeer dink ek my musiek is min of meer Romanties en tradisioneel... en watter mark is daar nou eintlik daarvoor?

His compositional developments radically changed when he received formal instruction in composition, as previously mentioned, at the RAM, UK. He rejected the traditions of his English contemporaries, such as Britten and Walton, and instead followed his musical instincts, as Van Wyk recalls his compositional methods were done instinctively, therefore without having to explain each step in a logical manner. As concert pianist, and follower of the Romantic ideologies, Van Wyk soon after became interested in the piano works by composers such as the late works of Beethoven, Chopin, and Liszt. This "lack of strong inner creative direction" is also evident in van Wyk's "frequent use of imported material of various kinds as the basic points of departure for further musical treatment".

During his stay in the UK, and thanks to his friendship with Ferguson, Van Wyk socialised with the likes of Ralph Vaughan Williams and Gerald Finzi, of which both were following the 'after wave' of post-Elgar tonal idioms. Soon after, he became interested in the compositional techniques of Benjamin Britten, who followed the models of composers such as Igor Stravinsky, Alban Berg, and Gustav Mahler. What attracted Van Wyk most was Britten's ability to compose music that reflected the ideas of social commentary.

Another factors in van Wyk's compositional development was his intense love and interest in literature and poetry. Since creating 'beautiful things' was of primary concern for him, he often included several poems or artistic expressions in his compositions of prominent figures such as N.P. van Wyk Louw and W.E.G. Louw. He often used poetry and literature as point of departure for the establishment of compositional titles: Vier Weemoedige Liedjies, Van Liefde en Verlatenheid, and Vyf Elegieë vir Strykkwartet. The texts that Van Wyk selected for his compositions often represented nostalgic sentiments, frequently the expressions of pessimism, or the indication of isolation.

Arnold van Wyk also undertook revisions of earlier work late in his life, with Poerpasledam (originally for piano duet, composed during wartime London in 1944) revised for flute and piano, and premiered with himself on piano and with Éva Tamássy on flute, on 20 February 1981.

== Legacy ==
After his death in 1983, several scholars published tributes to commend the composer for his contribution to South African art music. Some of these tributes emphasised how Van Wyk's compositions reflected the ideology of Afrikaner nationalism. Other, analytical commentaries, place his works in context in the compositional development of the composer. There has been little attempt to place the works within a greater context of compositional development in a specifically South African context, due largely to an individual style that is not easily categorised.

In a tribute to Van Wyk after his death, South African musicologist Jacques Pierre Malan wrote that the creation of a South African abstract art music "was the work of one man, the prophet of South African music, Arnold van Wyk. He was our first sovereign sound-master, the first one to draw attention abroad as a creative artist, the first to create locally, between all the foreign masters, the possibility of establishing an own music of the highest quality, the first to make musical achievements count as much as all the other achievements—to name just a few of the 'firsts'."

In 2014, South African musicologist Stephanus Muller published "Nagmusiek", which provides both scholarly analyses and fictionalised interpretations of the life and works of Arnold van Wyk. Muller received the "UJ Prize for a Debut Novel" in 2015 for his publication.

The Stellenbosch University musicology department added a South African music course to the curriculum in 2017 which studies works from Van Wyk, Hendrik Hofmeyr, William Henry Bell, Jeanne Zaidel-Rudolph, and Andile Khumalo.
