= Cromwell Everson =

South African composer (1925–1991)

Dr Cromwell Everson

Head of the performing arts department at Technicon Natal, South Africa
- In office 1976–1991
- Preceded by: first
- Succeeded by: none

Personal details
- Born: 28 September 1925 Beaufort West, Cape Province, Union of South Africa
- Died: 11 June 1991 (aged 65) Durban, Natal, Republic of South Africa
- Spouse: Hermine
- Children: Katrienka, Ludwig and Melina
- Education: Stellenbosch University and University of Cape Town
- Profession: Classical music composer

Cromwell Everson (28 September 1925 – 11 June 1991) was primarily known as a composer during his lifetime. He was brought up as an Afrikaner by his mother, Maria De Wit and father, Robert Everson. He continued this tradition and all his children were brought up as Afrikaners.

Everson wrote the first Afrikaans opera, and most of his other vocal works were in Afrikaans. His works consist of five sonatas, a trio, an opera, a set of inventions, four song-cycles, a piano suite, miscellaneous movements for the piano and guitar and an incomplete symphony and string quartet.

During Everson's career in Worcester, Western Cape he also gave music lessons to the musician David Kramer.

For his Afrikaans opera Everson received in 2007 a posthumous acknowledgement from the ATKV (Afrikaans Language- and Cultural society).

== Education ==
- 1945, Matric, Central High School, Beaufort West
- 1950, Bachelor of Music, Stellenbosch University
- 1974, Doctor of Music, University of Cape Town

Everson composing

== Compositions ==
=== Vocal works ===
==== Opera ====
- Klutaimnestra (eng:Clytemnestra) (Libretto, Cromwell Everson), Afrikaans opera in four acts (1967). First performance 7 November 1967, Biesenbach Hall, Worcester
- Rat a Plan (Libretto, unannotated), incomplete chamber opera (1952).

==== Choral ====
- Kyrie Eleison, SATB (1952)

==== Song cycles ====
- Vier Liefdesliedjies ("four love songs") for soprano and piano (1949). First performance on 9 June 1955 in the Stellenbosch Conservatory of Music. First radio broadcast performance on 11 January 1960 (Switzerland).
  1. Nagliedjie (N. P. van Wyk Louw)
  2. Net altyd jy (N. P. van Wyk Louw)
  3. Nooit Nog (W. E. G. Louw)
  4. Dennebosse (N. P. van Wyk Louw).
- Kontraste (D. J. Opperman) (1951)
- Water en Woestyn (1955) re-titled Die Dobbelsteen (1984). First performance on 26 August 1956 in the Stellenbosch Conservatory of Music.
  1. By alle skone dinge (N. P. van Wyk Louw)
  2. Drie Bome (Uys Krige)
  3. Die Karnaval sal eindig (I. Rousseau)
  4. Boer (D. J. Opperman)
  5. Hael (D. J. Opperman)
  6. Wat kan ek jou gee? (N. P. van Wyk Louw)
  7. Nagrit (I. Rousseau)
- Three Brontë Songs (1987)

==== Solo songs ====
- Maria (W. E. G. Louw) for soprano and piano (1949)
- Nagstorm oor die see (D. J. Opperman) for dramatic soprano and piano (1950)
- Die Vreemde Dae (Elisabeth Eybers) for soprano and piano (1949)

=== Instrumental works ===
==== Orchestral ====
- Symphony, an incomplete work (1953)
- Danza Senzule for chamber orchestra (1961)

==== Chamber music ====
- String Quartet (first movement), an incomplete work (1949)
- Trio for Viola, Violoncello and Piano (1963)

First complete performance 8 April 1978, SABC Concert Studio Sea Point, Cape Town. First radio broadcast performance 20 July 1971 (SABC).

- String Quartet, an incomplete work (1970)

==== Solo works ====
- Suite for Piano (1951)
- Prelude and Fuga for piano solo (1953–1954)
- Sonata – Variation I for piano solo (1953)
- Sonata – Variation II for piano solo (1956)
- Sonata for violin and piano (1954). Dedicated to famous violinist Maria Neuss. First performance and live broadcast (SABC) 22 August 1954, Hidding Hall, Cape Town.
- Three Eliegies for piano solo (1970)
- Variations for piano (1978)
- Etude for piano solo (1981)
- Guitar Sonata (1984). Dedicated to David Hewitt
- Cantús Tristitae, for solo guitar (1984). First performance 11 Augustus 1985, Jubilee Hall, Durban. First radio broadcast performance 5 July 1988 (SABC).
- Sonato for solo flute (1987). Dedicated to Esmé Venter.
- Sonato for violin solo (1985 rev. 1987). Dedicated to Marike Urban-Grimm.
- Wedding March for organ solo (1987). Dedicated to Ludwig en Retha Everson.

Everson composing a tune on his computer

==== Electro-acoustical works ====
- Son Staan Stil, an electronic music composition (1971)
- Seven Inventions, a computer music composition (1988)
