= Éva Tamássy =

- Born: July 30, 1936; Budapest, Hungary
- Died: November 30, 2018 (aged 82); Stellenbosch, South Africa
- Occupation(s): Flautist, educator
- Spouse: Johannes Cronjé
- Children: Tom Cronjé, François Cronjé

Éva Martha Tamássy (30 July 1936 – 30 November 2018) was a Hungarian-born flutist and influential music educator. She is particularly remembered for her contributions to classical music in South Africa, where she became a prominent figure after emigrating from Hungary in the late 1950s.

== Early life and education ==
Éva Tamássy was born in Budapest in 1936. She pursued her musical education at the Ferenc Erkel Conservatorium (1950–1953) and the Franz Liszt Academy of Music in Budapest (until 1956). Following her studies in Hungary, she further developed her skills under the tutelage of renowned French flutist Jean-Pierre Rampal, attending classes during his concert tours in South Africa.

== Career in South Africa ==
In 1956, Tamássy fled Hungary with her family after the Hungarian Revolution, settling in Johannesburg, South Africa, a few months later. She quickly established herself as a leading figure in the South African classical music scene, performing as a soloist and chamber musician. Her performances with ensembles such as Musica Antiqua, the Pro Arte Wind Ensemble, the Tamássy Flute Quartet, Concerts 4x2, and the Tamássy-Fortescue Duo were widely acclaimed.

In 1965, she earned the Unisa Performers' Licentiate in Music (UPLM) with distinction, further cementing her reputation as a virtuoso flutist. Her career included collaborations with performing bodies such as the Cape Performing Arts Board (CAPAB), Natal Performing Arts Council (NAPAC), and South West Africa Performing Arts Council (SWAPAC). She also performed concertos with South African orchestras and contributed to radio transcription recitals for the South African Broadcasting Company (SABC).

== Teaching and mentorship ==
Tamássy held a teaching position at the University of Stellenbosch from 1960, where she mentored generations of flutists. Many of her students went on to have successful careers both in South Africa and internationally. Between 1988 and 1993, she frequently traveled to Europe to stay updated on developments in flute pedagogy and created opportunities for her students to study at prestigious institutions abroad.

In addition to teaching, Tamássy presented masterclasses in Stellenbosch, Cape Town, and Pécs, and created radio programmes, including a 13-part series titled From Shepherd to Symphony for the SABC. She also arranged Hungarian folk songs and other works for flute and piano (such as Schubert’s Arpeggione Sonata), contributing significantly to the flute repertoire. One of her notable arrangements was the adaptation of J.S. Bach's Goldberg Variations for harpsichord, which garnered critical acclaim.

Several South African composers dedicated works to her. Roelof Temmingh wrote several pieces for her, including Last Pieces no. 2 (Nostalgia) for solo flute, Flute Concerto, Sonata for flute and guitar, and Moedverloor op A mol for twelve flutes. Paul Loeb van Zuilenburg (sr.) wrote Ballet for flute and guitar and Scala for solo flute for her, while Hubert du Plessis composed Vier Antieke Dansstukke, op. 35. In 1981, she premiered Arnold van Wyk’s Poerpasledam for flute and piano, performing alongside the composer.

== Later life and legacy ==
From 1990 to 1996, Tamássy toured with pianist Virginia Fortesque, performing duo concerts in Austria, Hungary, Scotland, and France. Their performances included a recital broadcast on Radio Budapest. After retiring in 1998, she continued teaching and performing, maintaining a flute studio in Stellenbosch until shortly before her death in 2018. She self-published three CDs featuring light classical flute and piano pieces (with Elna van der Merwe), flute and harp music (with Kobie du Plessis), and Bach’s Goldberg Variations (with Mario Nell on organ and harpsichord).

Tamássy's extensive collection of flute scores is housed at the Africa Open Institute for Music, Research and Innovation in Stellenbosch.
