= John Joubert (composer) =

South African-British choral composer (1927–2019)

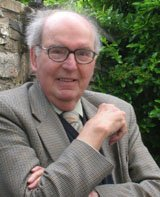
- John Joubert in 2007
- Born: 20 March 1927; Cape Town, Cape Province, Union of South Africa
- Died: 7 January 2019 (aged 91)
- Education: Diocesan College; South African College of Music; Royal Academy of Music; University of Durham
- Occupations: Composer; Academic
- Employers: University of Hull; University of Birmingham
- Website: www.johnjoubert.org.uk

John Pierre Herman Joubert (/dʒuːˈbɛər/ joo-BAIR; 20 March 1927 – 7 January 2019) was a British composer of South African birth, particularly of choral works. He lived in Moseley, a suburb of Birmingham, England, for over 50 years. A music academic in the universities of Hull and Birmingham for 36 years, Joubert took early retirement in 1986 to concentrate on composing and remained active into his eighties. Though perhaps best known for his choral music, particularly the carols Torches and There is No Rose of Such Virtue and the anthem O Lorde, the Maker of Al Thing, Joubert composed over 160 works including three symphonies, four concertos and seven operas.

== Early life and education ==
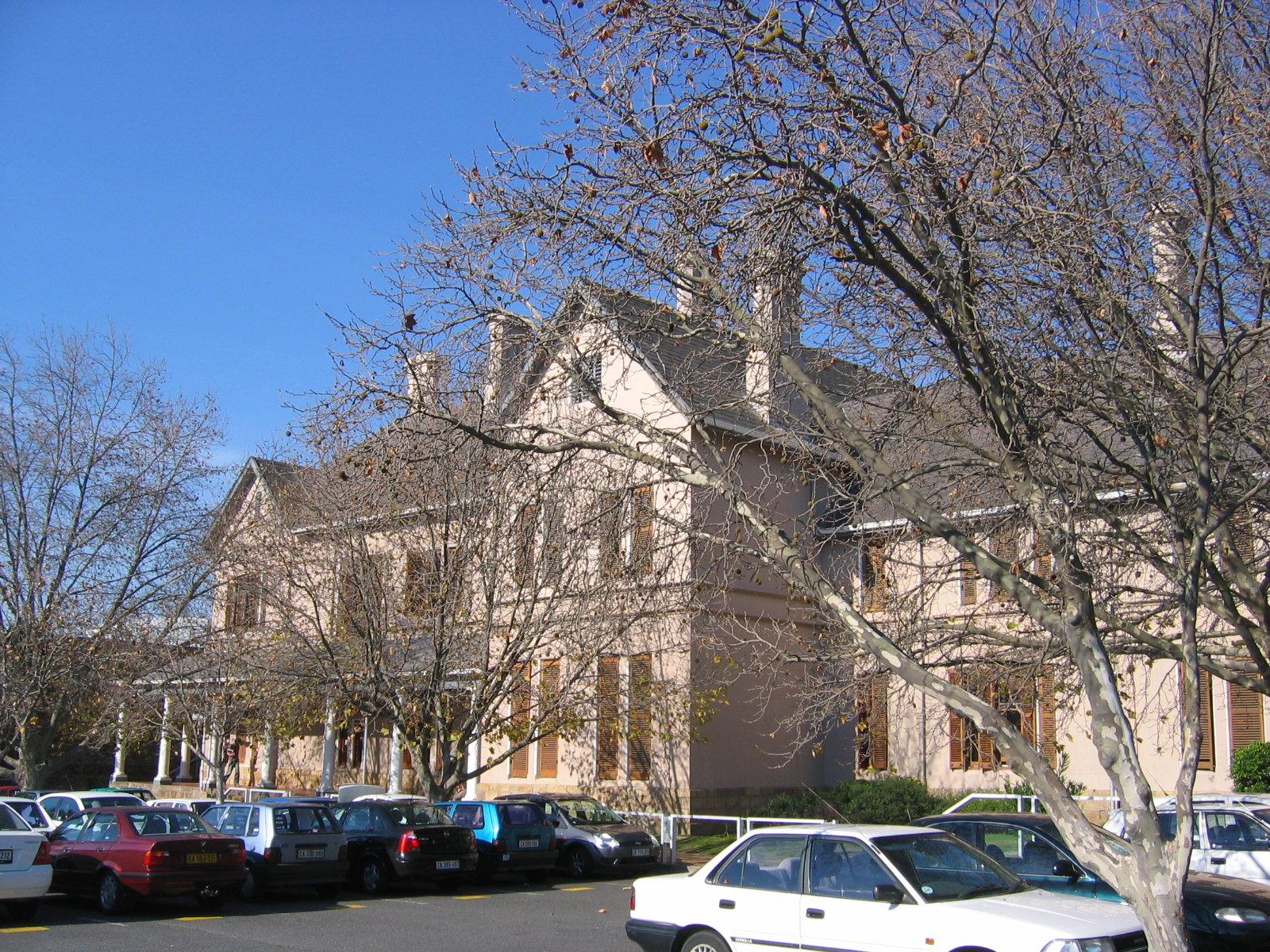
Strubenholm, the home of the South African College of Music at the University of Cape Town, from which Joubert graduated in 1944 – photographed in June 2006.

Joubert was born on 20 March 1927 in Cape Town, South Africa. His ancestors on his father's side were Huguenots, French Protestants from Provence who settled at the Cape in 1688. His mother's ancestry was Dutch. Joubert was educated at Diocesan College in Rondebosch, South Africa, which was founded by the Anglican Church and maintained a high standard of music-making. He originally hoped to become a painter, and did a fair amount of art at school. However, at about the age of 15 years, he gradually became interested in music, though as a composer rather than a performer. "It was always going to be something creative. Oddly enough, the visual arts haven't been as great a stimulus as literature. I was also interested in writing. In fact, I was bored by everything at school except writing, art and music!" In school, he came under the guidance of the musical director Claude Brown, whose teaching he regarded as "an indispensable foundation to my subsequent musical career". According to Joubert, "[t]hrough Brown, I learned all the Elgar choral works even before I heard them properly in full orchestral performance. Not only that idiom, but the idiom of Anglican church music generally. Parry and Stanford, and all the usual blokes." Through his teacher's encouragement, Joubert was able to participate in choral performances with the Cape Town Municipal Orchestra under William J. Pickerill, and subsequently to hear his works featured in performance.

After graduating from the South African College of Music in 1944 he began studying composition privately with William Henry Bell, an Englishman well known locally as a composer of distinction. Bell exerted the greatest influence on his composition. In 1946 he was awarded a Performing Right Society Scholarship in composition at the Royal Academy of Music in London. Here, his principal teachers were Theodore Holland, Howard Ferguson and Alan Bush. During his four years at the Academy he won a number of prizes for composition, notably the Frederick Corder prize and the 1949 Royal Philharmonic Society prize.

== Professional career ==
In 1950 Joubert was appointed to a lectureship in music at the University of Hull, having graduated in the same year with a Bachelor of Music (B.Mus.) degree from the University of Durham. His works soon began to be performed and to attract favourable attention. His carol Torches (Op. 7a, 1951) (written for his wife Mary's pupils and based on a Galician (Spain) carol, it was published in 1961 in the first volume of Carols for Choirs) and the anthem O Lorde, the Maker of Al Thing (Op. 7b, 1952) (which won the 1952 Novello Anthem Competition), achieved almost instant popularity. Concerning Torches, Joubert recalled, "I've even had carol-singers come to the door and singing it, without knowing the composer lives inside." Together with the carol There is No Rose of Such Virtue (Op. 14, 1954), the three choral works have become classics of the Anglican repertoire. Works in other genres followed, mostly as the result of commissions from institutions such as the City of Birmingham Symphony Orchestra, the Birmingham Festival Choral Society (named for the Birmingham Triennial Festival, the Royal Philharmonic Society and the BBC, and from musical festivals such as the Three Choirs Festival. By the end of his 12 years at Hull Joubert had composed, in addition to choral music, his Violin Concerto (Op. 13, 1954), the Symphony No. 1 (Op. 20, 1955, commissioned by the Hull Philharmonic Orchestra), the Piano Concerto (Op. 25, 1958), the full-length opera Silas Marner (Op. 31, 1961) (after the novel by George Eliot), and a body of chamber music including the String Quartet No. 1 in A-Flat (Op. 1, 1950), a String Trio (Op. 30, 1958) and an Octet (Op. 33, 1961).

Joubert moved to Moseley, Birmingham, in 1962 to take up a Senior Lectureship at the University of Birmingham; he was later made Reader in Music. In 1979 he was a visiting professor at the University of Otago in New Zealand. The number and scope of his works increased, and among those composed during the following decades were two further full-length operas, Under Western Eyes (Op. 51, 1968) and Jane Eyre (Op. 134) (based on the novels by Joseph Conrad and Charlotte Brontë respectively), Symphony No. 2 (Op. 68, 1970), various large-scale choral works with orchestras including the oratorio The Raising of Lazarus (Op. 67, 1970) and Herefordshire Canticles (Op. 93, 1979), the second and third piano sonatas (Op. 71, 1972; Op. 157), a second and third string quartet (Op. 91, 1977; Op. 112, 1986), song cycles with piano and/or instrumental ensembles, and accompanied and unaccompanied choral music on a smaller scale. On the wide scope of his work, Joubert has commented: "I've never really wanted to be pigeonholed as a composer. I've always wanted to write anything that I was either asked to, or wanted to write. I've never wanted to specialise, although I have to a certain extent been pigeonholed already. I'd rather not be looked upon as sort of limited in that way."

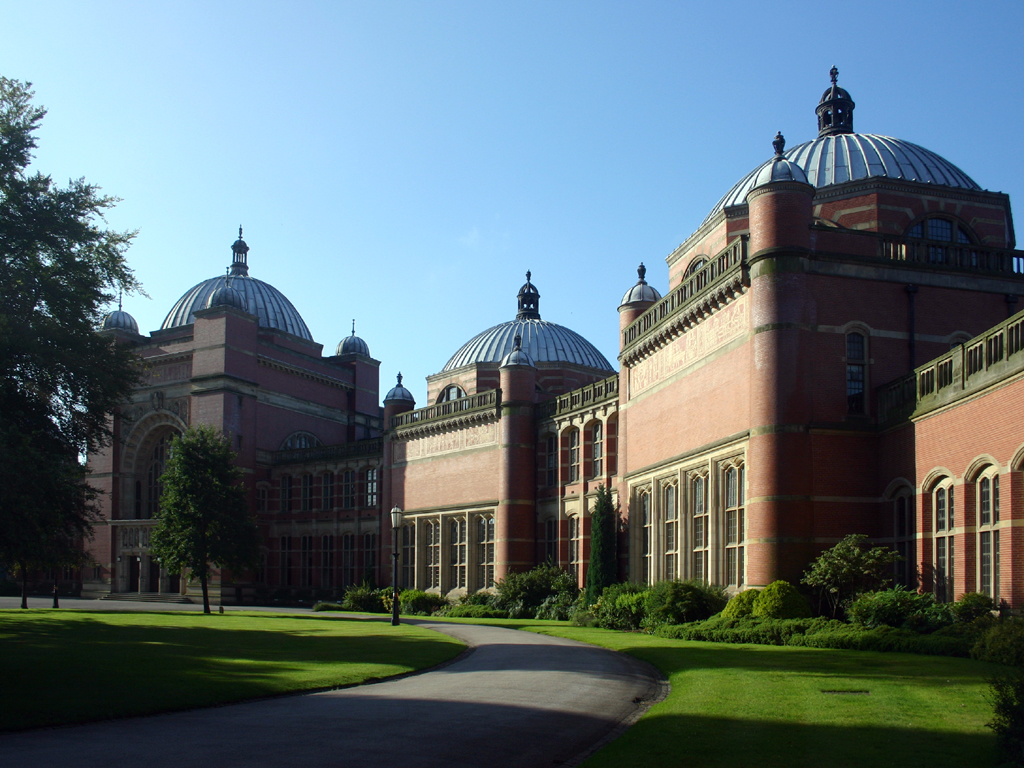
The Aston Webb Building of the University of Birmingham. Joubert lectured at the University between 1962 and 1986, and remained an Honorary Senior Research Fellow there. In July 2007, the University conferred on him an Honorary Doctorate of Music (D.Mus.).

In 1986 Joubert took early retirement from the University to concentrate on composition, although he maintained his ties by becoming an Honorary Senior Research Fellow there in 1997. He was conferred an Honorary Doctorate of Music (D.Mus.) by the University of Durham in 1991, and received another from the University of Birmingham on 18 July 2007. He was Composer in Residence at the Peterborough Cathedral Festival in 1990 (which also commissioned his Six Short Preludes on English Hymn Tunes, for chamber organ (Op. 125, 1990), and at the Presteigne Festival in 1997, and served as the chairman of the Birmingham Chamber Music Society for 25 years.

Joubert remained active as a composer. 2007 was the year of his 80th birthday, and was celebrated with a series of concerts, the "Joubertiade 2007", throughout the United Kingdom. These included world premières of the complete version of the oratorio Wings of Faith (Op. 143, 2000, 2003) which was performed by the Ex Cathedra choir, soloists and Academy of Vocal Music, and the City of Birmingham Symphony Orchestra, under the baton of Jeffrey Skidmore on 22 March 2007 at The Oratory, Birmingham; and a new Oboe Concerto performed by oboist Adrian Wilson and the Orchestra of the Swan conducted by David Curtis on 12 July 2007 at Lichfield Cathedral. The celebrations culminated in the world première of Five Songs of Incarnation (Op. 163, 2007) for tenor and choir which was commissioned through Joubertiade 2007 and performed on 24 November 2007 at St. Philip's Cathedral, Birmingham. In the same year, Lyrita released a celebratory CD of a recording (originally taped in 1994) of Joubert's Symphony No. 1 played by the London Philharmonic Orchestra under Vernon Handley.

== Personal life ==
Joubert and his wife Mary, a pianist, had a daughter Anna, who is a cellist, and a son Pierre, a violinist. He had four grandchildren. He died on 7 January 2019, aged 91. Both Birmingham Bach Choir and Ex Cathedra sang at his funeral.

== Selected recordings ==
- Cello Concerto: Raphael Wallfisch, BBC National Orchestra of Wales, William Boughton, Lyrita SRCD344 (2014)
- Chamber & Instrumental Music: Brodsky Quartet, Patricia Rozario, John McCabe, Mark Bebbington, SOMM CD 060-2 (2007)
- Choral Music: Choir of Gloucester Cathedral, Adrian Partington, Priory Records PRCD 1028 (2010)
- Choral Music: Louis Halsey Singers, BMS 102 CDH (1975, reissued 2007)
- Four Song Cycles: Lesley-Jane Rogers, John McCabe, John Turner, Toccata 0045 (2007)
- The Instant Moment, Temps Perdu, Sinfonietta: Henry Herford, English String Orchestra, William Boughton, BMS (2007), reissued Naxos 8571368 (2015)
- Jane Eyre: April Fredrick, David Stout, English Symphony Orchestra, Kenneth Woods, Somm 263-2 (2017)
- Oboe Concerto: Jinny Shaw, Orchestra Nova, George Vass, Guild GM 7383 (2013)
- Octet: Dionysus Ensemble, online (2025)
- Organ Music: Tom Winpenny, Toccata 0398 (2017)
- Piano Concerto & Symphony No. 3: Martin Jones, BBC National Orchestra of Wales, William Boughton, Lyrita SRCD367 (2018)
- The Piano Music of John Joubert: Duncan Honeybourne, Prima Facie 162/3 (2019)
- South of the Line (choral music): Royal Birmingham Conservatoire Chamber Choir, Paul Spicer, Somm 0166 (2017)
- St Mark Passion, Missa Wellensis & Locus iste: Wells Cathedral Choir, Matthew Owens, Resonus 10198 (2017)
- String Quartets Nos. 1-3: Brodsky Quartet, Somm 0113 (2012)
- Symphony No.1: London Philharmonic Orchestra, Vernon Handley, Lyrita SRCD322 (2007)
- Symphony No. 2: Royal Scottish National Orchestra, Martin Yates, Dutton Epoch CDLX 7270 (2013)

== Major works ==
Joubert composed over 180 works including three symphonies, five concertos, four string quartets and seven operas. He had a major choral output including oratorios, anthems and carols. Some of his major works are listed below; a fuller list may be viewed on his website.

=== Stage ===
- Silas Marner (Op. 31, 1961), opera in three acts after the dramatic novel by George Eliot
- Under Western Eyes (Op. 51, 1968), opera in three acts, libretto by Cedric Cliffe after the novel by Joseph Conrad
- The Prisoner (Op.75, 1973), opera in two acts, libretto by Stephen Tunnicliffe based on Tolstoy's short story "Too Dear!". Commissioned for the 400th. Anniversary of Queen Elizabeth I Grammar School for Boys, Barnet, North London. First performance March 1973 conducted by David Patrick.
- Jane Eyre (Op. 134, 1987–1997), opera in three acts, libretto by Kenneth Birkin after the novel by Charlotte Brontë

=== Orchestral ===
- Symphony No. 1, Op. 20 (1955, rev. 1956)
- Sinfonietta, Op. 38 (1962)
- Symphony No. 2, Op. 68 (1970)
- Déploration, Op. 92 (1978)
- Temps Perdu, Op. 99 (1984)
- Symphony No. 3 (on themes from the opera Jane Eyre), Op. 178 (2014–17)

=== Concertante ===
- Violin Concerto, Op. 13 (1954)
- Piano Concerto, Op. 25 (1958)
- Bassoon Concerto, Op. 77 (1974)
- Oboe Concerto, Op. 160 (2006)
- Cello Concerto, Op. 171 (2011)

=== Chamber ===
- String Quartets
  - String Quartet No. 1 in A-Flat, Op. 1 (1950)
  - String Quartet No. 2, Op. 91 (1977)
  - String Quartet No. 3, Op. 112 (1986)
  - String Quartet No. 4, Op. 121 (1988)
- Viola Sonata, Op. 6 (1952)
- String Trio, Op. 30 (1958)
- Octet, Op. 33 (1961)
- Tombeau, Op. 86 (1981), for unaccompanied viola da gamba
- Piano Trio, Op. 113 (1986)

=== Keyboard ===
- Piano
  - Piano Sonata No. 1 (in one movement), Op. 24 (1957)
  - Piano Sonata No. 2, Op. 71 (1972)
  - Piano Sonata No. 3, Op. 157 (date unknown)
- Organ
  - Passacaglia and Fugue Op. 35 (1961)
  - Prelude on "Picardy" (date unknown)
  - Six Short Preludes on English Hymn Tunes, Op. 125 (1990)

=== Oratorios ===
- Urbs Beata (Op. 42, 1963) commissioned to celebrate the completion of St George's Cathedral, Cape Town. It received its first performance under the direction of organist and choirmaster Keith Jewell.
- The Raising of Lazarus (Op. 67, 1970)
- Wings of Faith (Op. 143, Part 1 ("The Word Fulfilled"): 2000, Part 2 ("The Transforming Spirit"): 2003)
- An English Requiem (op.166, 2010) commissioned for the Gloucester 2010 Three Choirs Festival, receiving its first performance at the festival on 9 August 2010.

=== Anthems, carols, hymns and other choral works ===
- Torches (Op. 7a, 1951), carol
- O Lorde, the Maker of Al Thing (Op. 7b, 1952), anthem
- There is No Rose of Such Virtue (Op. 14, 1954), carol
- Let There Be Light (Op. 56, 1969), commissioned by the Collegiate Choir at Illinois Wesleyan University
- How are my foes increased, Lord! (Op.61, 1969), Commissioned for David Patrick and the Choir of Barnet Parish Church.
- Five Carols For Five Voices (1973) ("Of a Rose, a lovely Rose", "Make we joy now in this feast", "Jesu, son most sweet and dear", "When Christ was born of Mary", "Let us gather hand in hand") composed for The Scholars (Vocal Group)
- Herefordshire Canticles (Op. 93, 1979), for chorus, boys' choir, solos and orchestra
- A Hymne to God the Father (1987), hymn
- Rochester Triptych (Op. 139, 1997: made up of Universal Nature (Op. 139, date unknown), Impartial Death (Op. 139, date unknown) and Blest Glorious Man (Op. 126, 1991)), for choir and organ
- The Souls of the Righteous (Op. 142, 1999), anthem
- Five Songs of Incarnation ("Of a Rose, a Lovely Rose", "Make We Joy Now in this Feast", "I Sing of a Maiden", "When Christ was Born of Mary", "Let Us Gather Hand in Hand") (Op. 163, 2007), for tenor and choir

== Sources ==
- Biography, 13 September 2008, archived from the original on 28 August 2008.
- Morris, John, John Joubert, ChesterNovello.
- Morley, Christopher, Just the Joubert, Orchestra of the Swan, archived from the original on 28 September 2007.
- Programme for Ex Cathedra's performance of John Joubert's Wings of Faith at The Oratory, Birmingham, on 22 March 2007.
- Wiliamson, Reg, John Joubert, Classical Music on the Web.
