= Stefans Grové =

South African composer (1922–2014)

- Born: 23 July 1922; Bethlehem, Orange Free State, Union of South Africa
- Died: 29 May 2014 (aged 91) Pretoria, Gauteng, Republic of South Africa
- Years active: 1940–2014

Stefans Grové (23 July 1922 – 29 May 2014) was a South African composer. Before his death the following assessment was made of him: "He is regarded by many as Africa's greatest living composer, possesses one of the most distinctive compositional voices of our time".

== Early life ==
In Bethlehem, Orange Free State, where Grové was born, his mother worked as a music teacher and his father as a school principal. Grové's musical education began at school and his first compositional efforts date from that time. He eventually trained as a pianist and organist, with the guidance from his mother's brother, D.J. Roode. As a student he remained an avid reader of musical scores (often without the assistance of accompanying soundtracks) which not only informed his own development as a composer but may also have developed his talent for sight-reading at the piano.

== Life and works ==
In 1942 Grové moved to Klerksdorp where he worked as a teacher church organist for two years. Thereafter he relocated to study composition at the University of Cape Town first with William Henry Bell and then with Erik Chisholm. Compositions from this time include a ballet suite for orchestra (1944), the String quartet in D major (1945), and a czardas for violin and piano (1946?).

As the first South African recipient of a Fulbright Scholarship, Grové had the opportunity of going to Harvard University where he completed his master's degree. His teachers there included Thurston Dart and Walter Piston. Works that Grové composed under their guidance won him the G. Arthur Knight Prize and the New York Bohemian Prize. These were awarded for the Pianoforte trio and the Sonata for pianoforte and cello respectively. Grové attended Aaron Copland's composition class at the Tanglewood Summer School and studied the flute at the Longy School of Music. After these studies, beginning in 1956, Grové taught at the Bard College for two years, and then at the Peabody Institute in Baltimore for a further eight. While working at the Bard College, Grové also took up a post as choirmaster for the Franklin Street Presbyterian Church, where he pursued an interest in the performance of early music—most notably the cantatas of J.S. Bach. A similar venture was undertaken with a group that Grové founded in 1962, the Pro Musica Rara.

While abroad, Grové evidently had a viable platform for the performance of his music. Thus, his Elegy for strings was performed in the Washington Gallery in 1952; the Three inventions for the piano was featured at the Salzburg ISCM Festival of 1953; the Sonata for flute and piano was played at Cambridge, Massachusetts in 1954; the Harp quintet at Guildhall, London, in 1954; the Partita for orchestra in Brussels, in 1964; the First Symphony was led by Max Rudolph with the Cincinnati Orchestra in 1966; the Violin Concerto was performed that same year in Baltimore, Gabriel Banat being the soloist; and the Sinfonia concertante was recorded in 1973 by the Radio Orchestra of South-West Australia.

== Afrocentrism ==
Grové returned to South Africa for a sabbatical in 1960 when he lectured at both the Potchefstroom University for Christian Higher Education as well as the South African College of Music. He returned to South Africa permanently in 1972 and, the following year, was appointed as a lecturer at the University of Pretoria.

Grové was one of the first white South African composers to incorporate elements of black African music into his own style, "venturing far beyond mere couleur locale to forge a unique creative synthesis of the indigenous and the "Western"."

Grové's 'African' stylistic phase was result of a Damascus moment when he overheard a song sung by an African streetworker. The melody haunted him and inspired the Sonata on African Motives for violin and pianoforte (1984). Some other works composed in Grové's afrocentric style are: the Dance Rhapsody (1986), Liedere en danse van Afrika (1990), 7 Boesman-liedere for soprano and string quartet (1990), Gesang van die Afrika-geeste (1993), Nonyana, the Ceremonial Dancer for piano (1994), Afrika Hymnus I for organ (1995), and Afrika Hymnus II for organ (1996).

Remembering the African element in Grové's mature style, one can trace his development "from Debussy and Ravel through to Bartok and the neo-classicism of Hindemith, with passing passions for Messiaen and a more lasting fascination for Bach and early counterpoint". He undoubtedly had a better exposure to European and American avant-garde than his contemporaries and that difference can be noticed in the quality of his music. His work, Glimpses. Five Miniatures for Piano (2004) was performed at the ISCM World Music Days in Hong Kong in November 2007.

He died in Pretoria, aged 91.

== Writing ==
Apart from his work as a composer, Grové was also a fine writer whose essays and short fiction has received praise from no less a figure than André P. Brink. He was also active as a music critic, most notably for the newspapers Rapport and Beeld.

== Legacy ==
He forms part of a triumvirate of white Afrikaans composers who are considered as "founding fathers of South African art music". The other two composers in this category are Arnold van Wyk and Hubert du Plessis. Beyond that, and arguably more significantly, Grové has managed to shape a "hybrid style" for himself, beginning a new creative phase in a time when it must have amounted to a radical move on his part: he was a white composer—working in a country that was still functioning at the height of P.W. Botha's apartheid administration—whose new style was rejecting any notions of apartheid (separateness) by fusing white South African (Western) and black South African (African) musical languages. Unlike van Wyk and du Plessis, he was "prepared to consider and eventually to develop consistently a rapprochement between his Western art and his physical, African space".

== Works ==
Opera:

Die bose wind (Stefans Grové), opera in three acts, 1983

Ballet:

Ballet suite, 1944

Alice in Wonderland, based on Lewis Carroll, Baltimore 1960

Waratha, 1977

Pinocchio, ballet for children, 3 acts, 1988

Incidental Music:

Uit die dagboek van ’n soldaat (N.P. van Wyk Louw), 1963

Orchestral works:

Elegy, for string orchestra, 1948

Overture, 1953

Konsertante simfonie, for chamber orchestra, 1955

Symphony 1962

Partita, 1962

Kettingrye (Chain Rows), 1978

Vladimir’s Round Table. Study in the Russian Style, 1982

Statement for future elaboration, 1983

Dance Rhapsody: Cosmopolitan City, 1985

Concertato Overture: Five Salutations on Two Zulu Themes, 1986

Overture Itubi – a Festive Dance, 1992

Invocation from the Hills and Dances in the Plains, 1994

Figures in the Mist (2012)

Concertos:

Simfonia concertante, 1955

Concerto for violin and orchestra, 1959

Daarstelling, for flute, harpsichord and strings, 1972

Concerto Grosso, for violin, cello, piano and string orchestra, 1974

Maya, concerto grosso for violin, piano and string orchestra, 1978

Suite Concertato. Homage to Bach, Handel and Scarlatti, for harpsichord and string orchestra, 1985

Raka: Symphonic Poem in the Form of a Concerto for Piano and Orchestra, after N. P. van Wyk Louw’s Raka, 1995-6

Concertino for piano, trumpet, marimba, flute and strings, 2003

Brass or Wind Ensemble:

Tower Music for brass ensemble, 1954

Suite Juventuti, for winds and percussion, 1986

Chamber Music:

String Quartet in D Major, 1946

Czardas, for violin and piano, 1945

String Trio, 1947

Sonata for clarinet and piano, 1949

Duo for violin and cello, 1950

Duo for viola and cello, 1950 (arr. of the Duo for violin and cello)

Trio, for oboe, clarinet and bassoon, 1951

Trio for violin, cello and piano, 1951

Serenade, for flute, oboe, viola, clarinet and harp, 1952

Trio for oboe, clarinet and bassoon, 1952

Sonata for cello and piano, 1953

Quintet for harp and string quartet, 1954

Divertimento, for recorder trio, 1953

Sonatina for two recorders, 1955

Metamorfose. Humoristiese variasies op ‘Baba Black Sheep’, for recorder trio, 1955

Sonata for flute and piano, 1955

String quartet, 1955

Divertimento, for flute, oboe, clarinet and bassoon, 1955

Two Movements for string quartet, 1958

Sonatine, for recorders, 1960

Three pieces for harp, 1974

The night of 3 April, for flute and harpsichord, 1975

Portret van ’n meisie, for clarinet and guitar, 1975

For a winter’s day, phantasy for bassoon and piano, 1977

Scaramouche, for bassoon solo, 1978

Tribal Dance, for bassoon and piano, 1981

Conversation for three, for oboe/cor anglais, clarinet/bass clarinet, percussion, 1978

Cyclops, for double bass and piano, 1980

Symphonia quattuor cordis, for violin solo, 1981

Herderslied, for oboe and piano, 1981

Aubade, for trumpet and piano, 1981

Koraal, for flute and piano, 1981

Chloe, for oboe and piano, 1981

Fanfare, for trumpet and piano, 1981

Bose kabouter, for clarinet and piano, 1981

Mirror on the Wall, for clarinet and piano, 1981

Swaaiende takke, for flute and piano, 1981

Hartseerlied, for clarinet and piano, 1981

Kronkelsleepsels in die sand, for clarinet and piano, 1981

Akwarel tweekeer besigtig, for double bass and piano, 1983

Concerto senza orchestra, for six cellos, 1984

Gesprek vir drie, for oboe/cor anglais, clarinet/bass clarinet and percussion (Orff instruments, glock, 3 bongos, cassa roulante), undated

Quintet for harp, flute, clarinet, violin and viola, 1986

Sextet for Cellos, 1986

Sonata on African Motives, for violin and piano, 1984

Pan and the Nightingale, for flute solo, 198?

City Serenade, for flute, clarinet, viola, cello and harp, 1985

Trio, for violin, horn and piano, 1988

Jeux de timbres, for harp, celeste and percussion (timpani, claves, gong, crotales, tamt, marimba), 1992

String Quartet: Song of the African Spirits, 1993

Sonata for Viola and Piano, 1994

Soul Bird, for flute, cello and piano, 1998

Portrait of a Clarinet Dancer, for clarinet solo, 1999

Organ Works:

Ritual, a fantasy for organ with four manuals, 1969

Chorale Prelude on Psalm 42, 1974

Rhapsodic Toccata, 1974

Afrika Hymnus I, 1991-3

Afrika Hymnus II, 1997

'Piano Music:'

Four Piano Pieces, 1945

Six mood pictures, pre-1947

Three Inventions, 1951

Three piano pieces, 1965

Toccata and Rhapsody, 1965

An experience in musical styles, for piano / harpsichord, ca 1970

Four piano pieces, 1975

Seven graded piano pieces for the youth, 1975

Sad Song

Cock Fighting

Night Music from a Far-Eastern Country, 1981

Bondige tokkate, 1981

Die klokke, for piano duet, 1981

Windklokkies in die nag, for piano duet, 1984

Wals van die Olifantjie, for piano duet, 1981

Songs and Dances of Africa, 1991-2

Blue Dream Valley, 1992

Jewish Folksongs, 1993

Nonyana, the Ceremonial Dancer, 1994

Images from Africa, 1998-9

Masks for two pianos, 1999

'Cadenzas:'

Cadenzas for Mozart’s Piano Concerto in E Flat, K 482

'Choral Works:'

2 Carols from Musica Britannica, 1974

Kaapse draaie (D. J. Opperman), for choir (SATB), guitar, piano, marimba, flute, clarinet and xylophone, 1974

Garden (Louis Eksteen), for female chorus (SSA), flute and viola, 1974

Landloper (Louis Eksteen), for female chorus (SSA), 1975

Lied van die Transvaal (F. J. Pretorius), for double choir (SATB), pianoforte duet, two trumpets and three timpani, 1975

Symphony, for three-part choir and orchestra, 1975 (unfinished)

Music for Easter, for Choir, organ, flute, strings and Orff instruments, 1977

Advent Music for choir, recorder and Orff instruments, 1977

Gesange 133 & 135, by H.L. Hassler, arr. Stefans Grové, 1983

Himmelskönig sei willkommen, for chorus (SATB), 2 trumpets and organ, 1982

Omnis caterva fidelium, for children’s chorus (SSA) and piano, 1985

Concerto burlesco: Gaudeamus igitur: Grepe uit die lewe van ’n eerstejaar (Stefans Grové), for narrator, chorus (SATB) and orchestra, 1992

Psalm 150 in Southern Sotho, for double choir (SATB / SATB), strings and percussion, 1996

Psalm 138, for children’s chorus (SA), chorus (SATB), African drums (two players), marimba and string orchestra, 2002

Solo Vocal Music:

Drie liedere, before 1945: 1. Dis al, (J. F. E. Celliers); 2. Berusting (Toon van den Heever); 3. Weeklag (Anon.)

Cantata profana (Stefans Grové), for two voices, flute, oboe, harpsichord and cello, 1959

Psalm 74, for mezzo-soprano, flute and harp, 1974

Three Japanese Songs, for mezzo-soprano and guitar, 1974

Five songs (Anon.: Old Chinese poems), for mezzo-soprano and guitar, 1975

Psalm 54, for mezzo-soprano, flute and harp, 1974

Light over Judea (Louis Eksteen), for mezzo-soprano and a melody instrument, 1975

Fulgebunt justi, for mezzo-soprano, alto flute and guitar, 1975

Vyf liedere op tekste van Ingrid Jonker, for soprano and piano, 1981

Bid (Petra Muller), for soprano and piano, 1988

Halfpad (Petra Muller), for soprano and piano, 1988

Daar waar jy woon (Petra Muller), for soprano and piano, 1988

7 Boesman-liedere, for soprano, string quartet and piano, 1990

Zulu Horizons (Benedict Vilakazi), four songs for voice and orchestra, 1992
