= Evelyn Dalberg =

South African operatic singer (1939–2025)

- Born: May 23, 1939; Leipzig, Germany
- Died: November 29, 2025 (aged 86); New Hanover, KwaZulu-Natal, South Africa
- Education: Guildhall School of Music and Drama; Musikhochschule Münster
- Occupation: Operatic mezzo-soprano
- Relatives: Frederick Dalberg (father)

Evelyn Dalberg (May 23, 1939 – November 29, 2025) was a South African operatic mezzo-soprano. She performed many roles, including Venus in Tannhäuser by Richard Wagner, Amneris in Aida by Giuseppe Verdi, Beatrice in Le donne curiose by Ermanno Wolf-Ferrari, the courtesan Giulietta in The Tales of Hoffmann by Jacques Offenbach, and the servant Nancy in Martha by Friedrich von Flotow.
