= W. E. G. Louw =

South African poet (1913-1980)

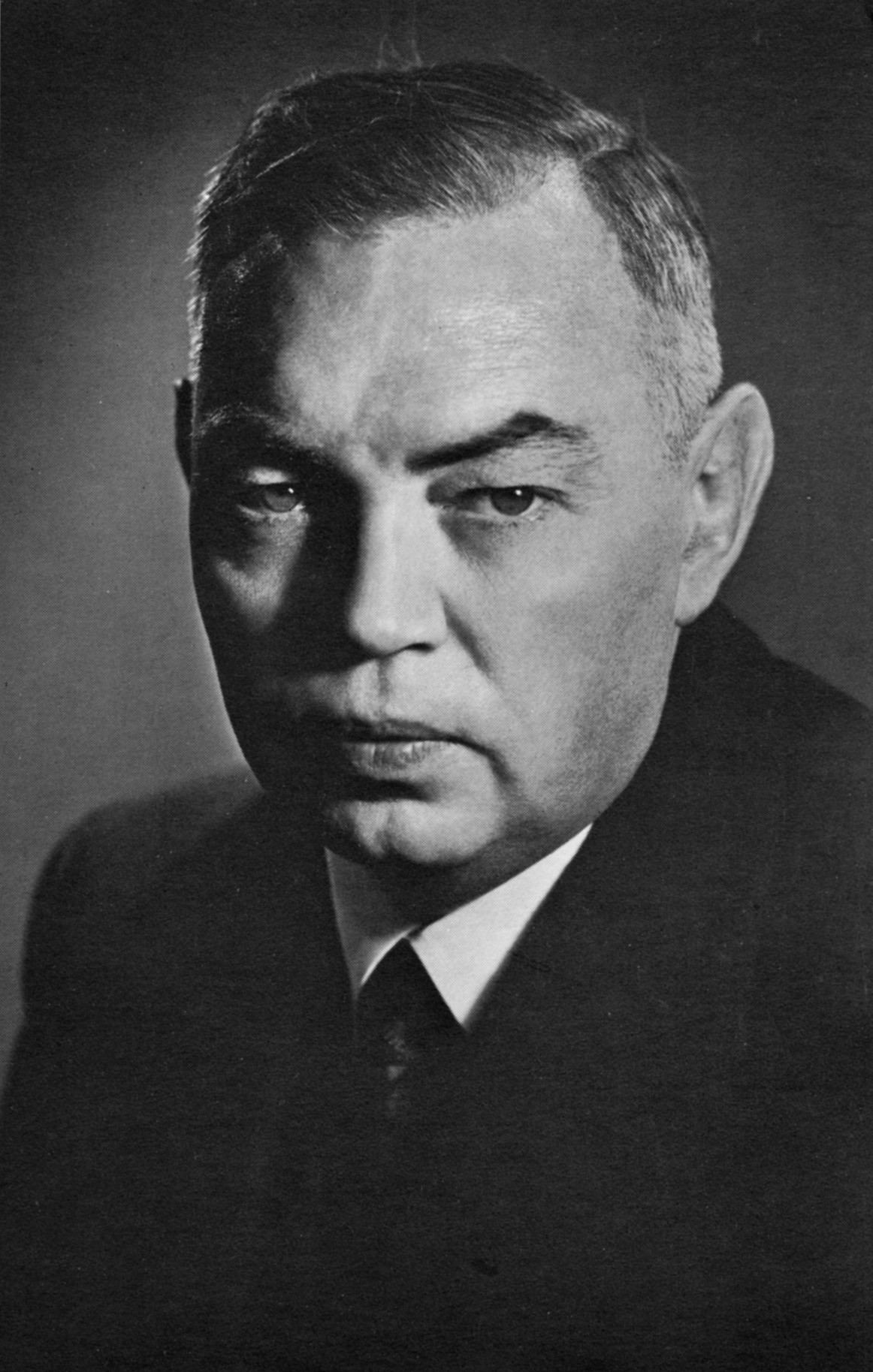
- Born: William Ewart Gladstone Louw; 31 May 1913; Sutherland
- Died: 24 April 1980 (aged 66); Stellenbosch
- Occupations: poet, writer
- Writing career
- Language: Afrikaans

William Ewart Gladstone Louw (31 May 1913 in Sutherland, formerly Cape Province, now Northern Cape Province in South Africa – 24 April 1980 in Stellenbosch, Western Cape Province, South Africa), also known as W. E. G. Louw, was an Afrikaner poet. He was the younger brother of the poet N. P. van Wyk Louw.

William Louw matriculated at the S. A. College School in Cape Town. He studied at the University of Cape Town from 1931 -1935 and was admitted to the degree of Master of Arts with a dissertation on the poetry of J. H. Leopold. He continued his studies in the Netherlands at the University of Amsterdam, where he was admitted to the degree of D.Lit.

Louw returned to Cape Town in November 1938. Here he completed another doctorate with a dissertation on the influence of Gorter on Leopold (Die Invloed van Gorter op Leopold). In 1944, he married the composer Rosa Nepgen.

In 1945, together with his brother N. P. van Wyk Louw and H. A. Mulder, Louw founded the independent magazine "Standpunte" ("Points of View"). Louw's first academic position was as professor of Afrikaans and Nederlands at Rhodes University in Grahamstown. In 1957 he accepted the post of Arts Editor at Die Burger (a newspaper in the Cape) and remained there until the end of 1966. From 1967 until his retirement in 1978, he served as professor of Dutch Literature at the University of Stellenbosch.

Louw's 1934's collection of poems entitled Die ryke dwaas ("The rich fool") might perhaps be seen as the start of the Dertigers movement within Afrikaans literature.^{1}

== His poems ==
Pale Falcon

White is the world
of historical mourning
and tragic the waltz
of the sea at day's dawning
dew on the dunes, no zephyr that wakes
just a falcon that sings in the circles he makes...

(Translated by J. W. Marchant).

== His influences ==
The South African composer Cromwell Everson constructed a song cycle, "Vier Liefdesliedjies" ("Four little love songs"), that found inspiration in a poem that W.E.G. had entitled "Nooit Nog" ("Never again").
