= William Henry Bell =

English composer, conductor and lecturer

William Henry Bell, known largely by his initials, W H Bell (20 August 1873 – 13 April 1946), was an English composer, conductor and lecturer.

== Biography ==
Bell was born in St Albans and was a chorister at St Albans Cathedral. He studied organ, violin and piano in London at the Royal Academy of Music along with composition under Frederick Corder, and modal counterpoint privately with Charles Villiers Stanford. He won the Goss Scholarship in 1899. He mainly made his living as an organist and lecturer; he was Professor of Harmony at the Royal Academy of Music where he taught from 1909 to 1912. In 1911 Bell was Director of Music for the Pageant of London at Crystal Palace.

In 1912, Bell went to South Africa to direct the South African College of Music in Cape Town. He was Principal until 1935 and is credited with a significant expansion of the school. In 1920, Bell became Professor of Music at the University of Cape Town, where he held classes for degree courses. The South African College of Music was incorporated into the University in 1923 and Professor Bell became Dean of the Faculty of Music. Bell founded the Little Theatre, a training center for opera, and occasionally directed the Cape Town Music Society. He was also responsible for founding the Speech and Drama Department at UCT in 1931, and the UCT Ballet School in 1934. He died in Gordon's Bay near Somerset West, Cape Province, Union of South Africa.

The W H Bell Music Library at the University of Cape Town is named in honour of William Henry Bell.

== Music ==
Compositions by Bell were heavily featured in the series of concerts directed by August Manns at Crystal Palace between 1899 and 1912. Premieres there included the Walt Whitman Symphony and the symphonic poems The Pardonor's Tale and The Canterbury Tales. The symphonic prelude A Song in The Morning received its London premiere at the BBC Proms in 1901, and Agamemnon its world premiere at the Proms in 1908. Dan Godfrey was also a champion of Bell's music in Bournemouth. Thomas Beecham put on performance of the Arcadian Suite, Love Among the Ruins and The Shepherd. However, when Bell moved to South Africa performances back in the UK all but ceased. He continued to compose while in South Africa with all of his four mature symphonies (numbers 2 to 5) premiered there. His Symphonic Variations received its first performance in Cape Town in August 1917, but was not heard in London until 24 February 1921 when Bell conducted it during a trip back to England. The three movement Concerto for Viola and Orchestra Rosa Mystica was also premiered in Cape Town in 1917, one year after it had been completed.

The South African Symphony (No 4) was first performed in Cape Town on 1 March 1928. While it is essentially a work in the European tradition it incorporates some African folk music elements. These, according to John Joubert, who took private composition lessons from Bell from 1942–46, were probably provided by Percival Kirby, Professor of Music at Witwatersrand University in Johannesburg. Bell's 70th birthday was celebrated in the UK with a BBC broadcast of the 1941 Symphonic Fantasy Aeterna munera as well as the Arcadian Suite on 20 August 1943. But since then his music has rarely been revived, with the exception of recordings of the South African Symphony and the Viola Concerto.

== Selected works ==
Opera

- Hippolytus (c.1914); music drama in 3 acts; libretto after Euripides
- Isabeau (1922–1924); fantasia in 1 act
- The Mouse Trap (1928); opera in 1 act; libretto after The Sire de Maletroit's Door by Robert Louis Stevenson
- Doctor Love (1930); opera in 1 act; libretto after Le Docteur amoureux by Molière
- The Wandering Scholar (1935); musical comedy in 1 act; libretto by Clifford Bax based on The Wandering Scholars by Helen Waddell
- The Duenna (1939); musical comedy in 3 acts; libretto by Richard Brinsley Sheridan
- Romeo and Juliet (1939); unfinished opera

Music for Japanese Noh plays

- Komachi (1925)
- Tsuneyo of the Three Trees (1926)
- Hatsuyuki (1934)
- The Pillow of Kantan (1935)
- Kageyiko (1936)

Incidental music

- Life's Measure (?1905–1908)
- A Vision of Delight (1906); music to the play by Ben Jonson

Ballet

- The Enchanted Well, The Vision of Delight (1934); a masque
- Fête Champêtre (1935)
- Le Jongleur de Notre Dame (1936)

Orchestral

- The Canterbury Pilgrims, Symphonic Prelude (1896) (after Chaucer)
- The Pardoner's Tale, Symphonic Poem (1898) (after Chaucer)
- Symphony No. 1 Walt Whitman in C minor (1899)
- A Song of the Morning, Symphonic Prelude (1901)
- Mother Carey, Symphonic Poem (1902)
- Epithalamium, Serenade for orchestra (1904)
- The Shepherd, Symphonic Poem (1907)
- Agamemnon, Symphonic Prelude (1908)
- Love among the Ruins, Symphonic Poem (1908)
- Arcadian Suite (c.1908)
- Danse du tambour (1909)
- Le fée des sources, Symphonic Poem (1912)
- Prelude (1912)
- Staines Morrice Dance (1912)
- Symphonic Variations (1915)
- Symphony No. 2 in A minor (1918)
- Symphony No. in F major (1918–1919)
- The Portal, Symphonic Poem (1921)
- A Song of Greeting, Symphonic Poem (1921)
- Veldt Loneliness (1921)
- In modo academico, Suite in C minor (1924)
- Symphony No. 4 "A South African Symphony" (1927)
- An English Suite (1929)
- Symphony No. 5 in F minor (1932)
- Aeterna munera, Symphonic Fantasy (1941)
- Hamlet, 5 Preludes (1942)

Concertante

- Rosa Mystica, Concerto for viola and orchestra (1916)

Chamber music

- Piano Quintet (1894)
- Sonata in E minor for violin and piano (1897)
- Cradle Song for violin and piano (1901)
- Arab Love Song for viola and piano
- Cantilena for viola and piano
- Arabesque for violin or viola and piano (1904)
- Sonata in D major for violin and piano (1918)
- Sonata in F minor for violin and piano (c.1925)
- Sonata in D minor for clarinet or viola and piano (1926)
- String Quartet in G minor (1926)
- Sonata for cello and piano (1927)
- String Quartet in F major (1927)

Piano

- The Witch's Daughter (1904)
- Chorale Variations (1940)
- 4 Elegiac Pieces (1940)

Organ

- Chants sans paroles (1901)
- Minuet and Trio in C major (1901)
- Postlude (Romance, Spring Song) (1902)

Choral

- Hawke for chorus and orchestra (c.1895)
- Mag and Nunc (1895)
- Miserere Maidens for soloist, chorus, orchestra and organ (1895)
- The Call of the Sea, Ode for soprano, choruses and orchestra (1902–1904)
- Hearken unto Me, Ye Holy Children, Anthem for baritone solo and chorus (published 1903)
- I Will Magnify Thee, O Lord, Anthem for Easter for mixed voices and organ (published 1903); words from Psalm XXX
- St. Albans Pageant Music, July 1907 for chorus and orchestra (1907); words by Charles Henry Ashdown
- The Baron of Brackley, Scotch Border Ballad for chorus and orchestra (1911)
- Maria assumpta for soprano, choruses and orchestra (1922)
- Prometheus Unbound for chorus and orchestra (1923–1924); words by Percy Bysshe Shelley
- Medieval Songs for chorus and piano (1927–1928)
- Medieval Songs for female chorus, string orchestra and piano

1. "The Maiden That Is Makeless" (to "I syng of a mayden")
2. "Mater ora filium"
3. "The Flower of Jesse"
4. "At Domys Day"
5. "May in the Greenwood"
6. "Twelve Oxen"

- Dicitus philosophi for chorus and orchestra (1932?); words by Benjamin Farrington
- The Tumbler of Our Lady for soloists, choruses and orchestra (1936)
- The Song of the Sinless Soul for mezzo-soprano, female chorus and orchestra (1944)
- Adonis for soprano, mezzo-soprano, female chorus and orchestra (1945)

Vocal

- The Rose and the Lily for voice and piano (1892)
- Songs of Youth and Springtide for voice and piano, Op. 9 (1892–1896); words by Robert Browning

1. "Summum Bonum" (on Browning's poem)
2. "Nay, but You, Who Do Not Love Her" (from Browning's collection Dramatic Romances and Lyrics)

- Serenade for voice and piano (1896)
- Three Songs for voice and piano (1896); words from Sonnets from the Portuguese by Elizabeth Barrett Browning

1. "Say Over Again"
2. "If Thou Must Love Me"
3. "I Lift My Heavy Heart"

- Crabbed Age and Youth for voice and piano (1898)
- Five Settings of E. Nesbit for voice and piano (1898); words by E. Nesbit
- Three Old English Songs for voice and orchestra
- Love's Farewell for voice and piano (1902)
- The Four Winds for baritone and orchestra (1903); words by C.H. Luderz
- Six Love Lyrics for baritone or alto and piano (1903); words by William Ernest Henley
- Sing Heigh Ho! for voice and piano (1903)
- Bhanavar the Beautiful, Song Cycle for voice and chamber ensemble (1908)
- The Ballad of the Bird Bride for baritone and orchestra (1909); words by Rosamund Marriott Watson
- The Little Corporal for voice and piano (1912)
- Sappho, Song Cycle for soprano and orchestra (1920, revised 1942)
- Claire de lune for voice and piano (1925); words by Paul Verlaine
- D'une prison for voice and piano (1925?); words by Paul Verlaine
- Que faudre-t'il a ce cœur for voice and piano (1925); words by Jean Moréas
- Four Medieval Songs for voice and piano (1927)
- Four Medieval Songs for voice and piano (1930)
- Twelve Blake Songs; words by William Blake

1. "Spring"
2. "Summer"
3. "Autumn"
4. "Winter"
5. "To the Evening"
6. "To Morning"
7. "My Pretty Rose Tree"
8. "The Fairy"
9. "In a Myrtle Shade"
10. "The Birds"
11. "My Spectre around Me"
12. "I Heard an Angel Singing"

== Notable students ==
- Hubert du Plessis (1922–2011)
- Stefans Grové (1922–2014)
- John Joubert (1927–2019)
