= Hubert du Plessis =

South African composer

Background information
- Born: Hubert Lawrence du Plessis; 7 June 1922; Malmesbury, Cape Province, Union of South Africa
- Died: 12 March 2011 (aged 88) Stellenbosch, Western Cape, Republic of South Africa
- Years active: 1943–1991

Hubert du Plessis OMSG (7 June 1922 – 12 March 2011) was a South African composer, pianist, and professor of music whose career spanned several decades. Along with Arnold van Wyk and Stefans Grové, du Plessis was one of the foremost South African composers of the 20th century.

== Biography ==
Hubert du Plessis was born to an Afrikaner family on a farm called Groenrivier in Malmesbury in the Western Cape on 7 June 1922. A musical prodigy from a young age, he began writing his own piano compositions by the time he was seven years old. In 1940 he enrolled in Stellenbosch University, becoming the first student at the university to graduate with a Bachelor of Music degree. His composition teacher from 1942 until 1944 was W.H. Bell.

In 1943 he briefly worked for the South African Broadcasting Company in Cape Town, but soon after accepted a position with the department of music at Rhodes University, where he became a lecturer. From 1951 to 1954, he studied at the Royal Academy of Music in London with Alan Bush and Howard Ferguson, and upon his return to South Africa he accepted a teaching position at Stellenbosch University, quickly becoming senior lecturer of the music department. In 1963 he was honored for his musical contributions by the South African Academy of Science and Art (commonly known as Die Akademie).

Du Plessis' compositions were varied and included both choral and instrumental pieces. He is noted for his contributions to both South African chamber music and orchestral music. Initially opposed to the idea, du Plessis included Afrikaans folk music in some of his later compositions. In the 1960s, he composed some nationalist works, which were endorsed by the National Party government, which he actively supported. He attributed his nationalistic music to a "growing consciousness" of his Afrikaner heritage, and therefore was not opposed to his music being used for political purposes.

Despite the strict laws against homosexuality in Apartheid South Africa, du Plessis was spared public disgrace and legal troubles by the government, and lived unashamedly as an outspoken and openly gay man. He appeared in front of the South African Parliament to campaign against tightening of anti-homosexuality laws in the late 1960s.

He died at his home in Stellenbosch on 12 March 2011 at the age of 88.

== Works by genre ==
=== Piano ===
- Vier klavierstukke, op. 1, 1944-1945 (1. Prelude, 2. Studie, 3. Elegie, 4. Dans)
- Ses minature, op. 3, 1945-1949
- Sonate no.1, op. 8, 1952
- Sonate vir klavierduet, op. 10, 1954 "Composed for H. Ferguson and D. Matthews"
- Cunctipotens genitor Deus, fantasie oor 'n 11de-eeuse organum, 1956
- Prelude, fuga en postludium, op. 17, 1958
- Sewe preludes, op. 18, 1964
- Inspiré par mes chats, suite, op. 27. (1. Déplotarion sur la mort de Dodo, 2. L'allégresse et la sagesse de Josquin, 3. Les petits pas amoureux de Tristan, 4. La tendresse d'Isolde, 5. Gaspard et sa souris, pas de deux, 6. Tombeau de Joséphine)
- Vier klavierstukke, op. 28 in opdrag van UNISA, 1964 (1. Hommage à Fauré, 2. Hommage à Ravel, 3. Hommage à Chopin, 4. Hommage à François Couperin)
- When I was a child-Toe ek 'n kind was, suite, op. 33, 1972 (1. Speeldoos, 2. Die tjellis, 3. Vleivolk, 4. Klawerliefde, 5. Rivierdroom, 6. Die skool sluit, 7. Kaleidoskoop, 8. Naggeluide)
- Sonate no. 2, op. 40, in opdrag van SAMRO, 1974-1975.
- Tien klavierwerke vir kinders en jongmense, op. 41, 1975 (Afd. I (vir kinders): 1. Heimwee van 'n Amerikaanse teddiebeer, 2. Angus en oom Koos maak maats, 3. Wispelturige Wilhelmina, 4. Ouboet en Kleinboet voel olik, 5. In die pretpark Afd. II (vir jongmense): 6. Hartseerwals, 7. Kwêla, 8. Mars, 9. Studie, 10. Scherzo)

=== Harp ===
- Variasies op 'n volkswysie, vir harpsolo, op. 31, 1967-1968

=== Chamber music ===
- Strykkwartet, op. 13, 1957
- Trio vir klavier, viool en tjello, op. 20, for the SABC, 1957-1960
- Drie stukke vir fluit en klavier, op. 25, 1962-1963 (1. Sarabande, 2. Wals, 3. Wiegelied)
- Vier antieke danse vir fluit en klavesimbel, op. 35 (1. Siciliano, 2. Tambourin, 3. Sarabande, 4. Gigue)
- Sonate vir altviool en klavier, op. 43, 1977

=== Orchestral ===
- Simfonie in a, op. 14, 1953-1954
- Musiek by drie skilderye van Henri Rousseau, op. 24, for the SABC, 1962 (1. Un soir de carnaval, 2. Pour fêter le bébé, 3. Le rêve)
- Die Stem van Suid-Afrika, for the SABC, 1960
- Vallée d'Obermann (Liszt) 1961
- Drie outas het in die haai Karoo, for the SABC, 1973

=== Other music ===
- Huberta the hippo (hoorbeeld deur Cecil Jubber), 1960
- Periandos van Korinte (Opperman), 1972
