= Ibiza Mayhem 2012 =

Studio album by Tim Scott
- Released: 16 December 2011
- Recorded: 2009–2011 Acer Studios (Hazel Grove, Cheshire)
- Genre: Instrumental, House music, Trance, Drum and bass, Dubstep, Experimental, Fusion, Dance, Funk, Latin
- Length: 39:04
- Label: Acer; ACERDDA003; 5060187620366; LC-19105 (Download, 16 December 2011)
- Producer: Tim Scott

Tim Scott chronology
Guitar Mashing (2008)	''Ibiza Mayhem 2012'' (2011)

Singles from Ibiza Mayhem 2012
- 1. "Amy Jane" Released: 9 November 2009; 2. "Cosmic Ignition" Released: 20 July 2010; 3. "Cataclysmic Pink" Released: 17 December 2010; 4. "One Life" Released: 22 March 2011; 5. "Rio Gold Dust" Released: 31 May 2011; 6. "Dirty Mule" Released: 1 August 2011; 7. "Ibiza Mayhem" Released: 1 December 2011

Professional ratings
Review scores
Source	Rating
CityLife	3/5 stars
Guitarist (magazine)	3/5 stars
Guitar Techniques (magazine)	3/5 stars

Ibiza Mayhem 2012 is the third studio album by solo instrumental artist Tim Scott, first released on iTunes on 16 December 2011. Comprising the seven singles released from November 2009 to December 2011, Ibiza Mayhem 2012 is formatted much like a hits compilation.

The concept of the album was to bring Tim Scott’s Guitar Mashing to a much wider audience which has been reiterated by the national magazine critique.

This album was recorded, mixed and produced by Tim Scott at Acer Studios, Greater Manchester and was mastered on 26 November 2011 by Geoff Pesche in Suite 5 at Abbey Road Studios, London.

== Critical reception ==
CityLife gave the album a positive review stating:

"Stockport's own guitar maestro Tim Scott could easily have been one of the many legions struggling to sustain a career in the shadow of Joe Satriani and Steve Vai - still the only purveyors of virtuosic rock guitar instrumentals that the man and woman in the street could pick out of a line-up. Instead, Scott took his guitar where, hitherto, the guitar had not exactly been welcome… clubland! He began attaching his bewilderingly fine guitar-noodling to the kind of rhythms you would expect to hear in a Balearic club rather than a rock venue. It was a cunning move. Although you will hear some familiar cheesy Ibiza synth sounds here and some floor-quaking beats, you will also hear something more musically eloquent than usual dance fare. It is good to hear this kind of fast and furious guitar playing set against this kind of rhythm too; the one complaint I've had about the likes of Satriani in the past is that, rhythmically, they are sometimes not very adventurous. The Spanish flavour here lends itself to a kind of turbo-charged flamenco, which Scott does very well indeed. Perhaps we could do with a little more at a lower tempo, like the slightly less frenetic One Life which demonstrates a lovely touch from Scott, worthy of Satch himself. But you wonder whether this album may fall between two stools: too clubby for the guitar nuts, too axe-heavy for the clubbers. That would be a shame, as Scott is a genuine innovator."

Guitarist (magazine) gave this album a favourable review stating:

"Don't let the title put you off - no, really. Instead of mind-numbing club music requiring disco pharmaceuticals just to get through (Volume XIV), Tim Scott gives us an album of expressive, shred-vibed guitar set to dance beats. At times it sounds like Pendulum with extra whammy and harmoniser. There's even, dare we say it, a touch of Brian May in his cascading melodic runs, while super-swift tapping joins standard funky, tropical beats on tracks such as Rio Gold Dust."

Guitar Techniques (magazine) gave this album a positive review stating:

"One of the biggest problems that every guitar-playing virtuoso faces is how to make all that instrumental expertise and technique appeal to more than a handful of dedicated followers. Well perhaps this Guitar Mashing, download only, release from the highly talented Tim Scott can provide at least one solution. Here seven highly intricate instrumental tracks have been given a solid dance back beat and a remix that makes them fun to listen to, and even if you're not about to spend the night in a sleazy club in Ibiza this is guaranteed to bring a smile to your face. What's more it's still technically breath-taking so none of the expertise is lost, it's just made accessible to a much wider audience. On the downside, nothing really stands out but when it's all such a high standard there's nowhere left to go. But well done Tim, it's about time someone turned this into an art form."

== Track listing ==
No.	Title	Writer(s)	Length
1.	"Cosmic Ignition (Magic Foo Mix)"	Tim Scott	6:29
2.	"Rio Gold Dust (Jacked Up Guitar Mix)"	Tim Scott	4:57
3.	"Cataclysmic Pink (Silver Snowflake Mix)"	Tim Scott	5:44
4.	"Ibiza Mayhem (Party Porn Mix)"	Tim Scott	5:03
5.	"One Life (Moonshine Sex Mix)"	Tim Scott	6:58
6.	"Dirty Mule (Original Mix)"	Tim Scott	4:26
7.	"Amy Jane (Extended Chaos Mix)"	Tim Scott	5:25

== Personnel ==
- Tim Scott – lead guitar, rhythm guitar, bass guitar, synth, percussion, drums, and drum programming

=== Production ===
- Tim Scott – producer, engineer, mixing
- Geoff Pesche – mastering
- Laura Turner – artwork

== Release history ==
Region	Date	Format	Label
United Kingdom	16 December 2011	Digital download	Acer Records
