= Hidden Years Music Archive =

South African music archive

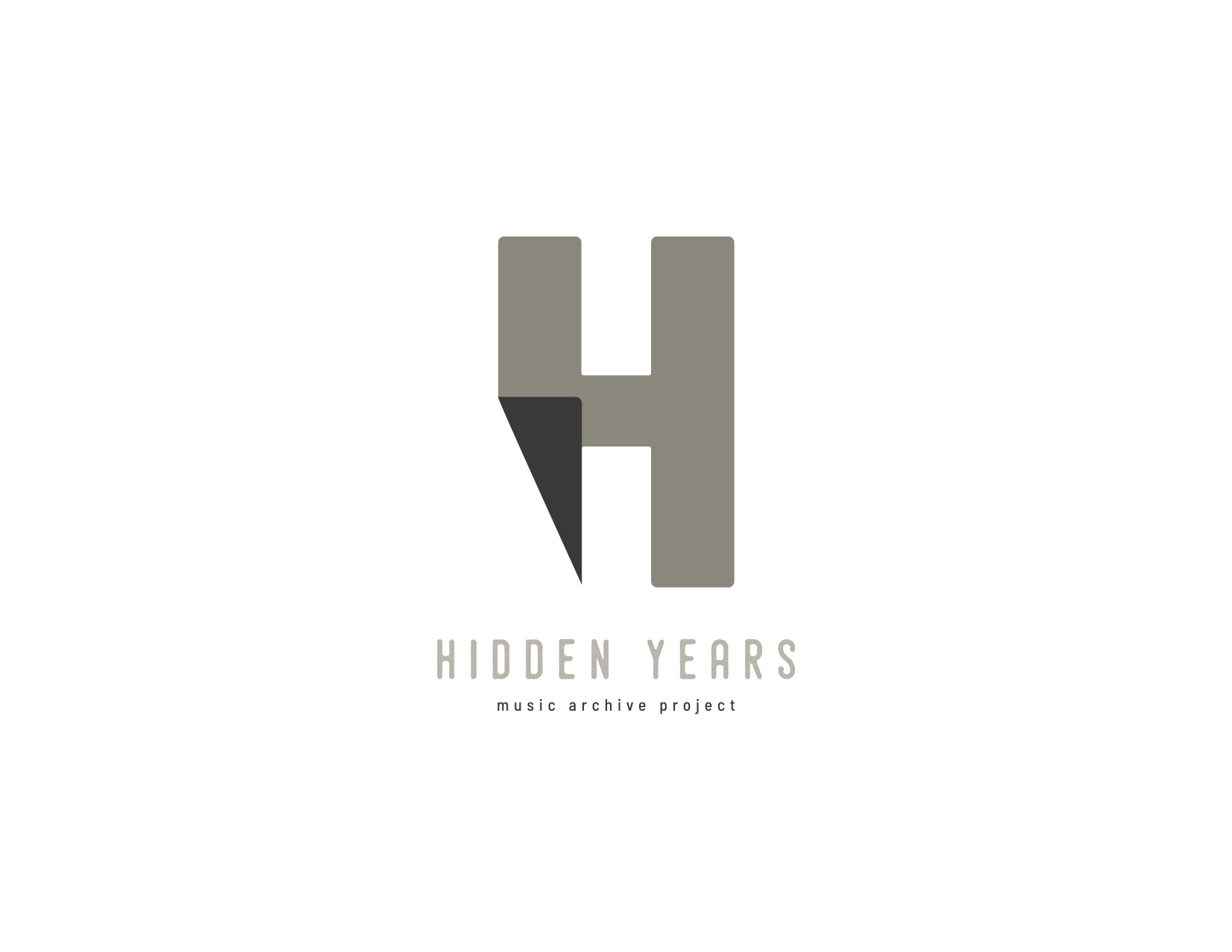

The Hidden Years Music Archive is an archive and interdisciplinary research project dedicated to the preservation and study of alternative and popular South African music. Established by David Marks in 1990, the archive holds a collection of around 175 000 items, which includes sound recordings, photographs, posters, programs, documents, press cuttings, notebooks, and diaries... The Hidden Years is a repository of urban folk tunes, township jazz expressions, country rock music, choir works, maskanda, and various traditional musics. In 2013 the archive was donated to the Documentation Centre for Music at Stellenbosch University and has since been managed by Dr Lizabé Lambrechts as the principal researcher and project leader. From 2017 the project has been hosted by the Africa Open Institute for Music, Research and Innovation at Stellenbosch University.

== History ==
The Hidden Years Music Archive Project was established by David Marks in 1990 in order to preserve, make accessible and share the music material he had collected.

Throughout his life, Marks was involved in the South African music scene as a singer-songwriter, sound engineer, producer and director of the 3rd Ear Music Company. The 3rd Ear Music Company was established in 1967 by Ben Segal and Audrey Smith as an independent record label to record, promote and produce music that was not considered commercially viable, or seen as too political by the major record companies and the State controlled broadcasting corporation. Marks took over the directorship of this company in 1970 and started 3rd Ear Sound which was made possible by Bill Hanley who donated part of the sound system used at the Woodstock Music and Arts Fair to David Marks

Marks met Hanley in 1969 and was offered a job as part of Hanley's sound crew. During this time, Marks gained valuable experience while working on various tours and festivals including the Monterey Pop Festival, the Newport Folk Festival and the legendary Woodstock Music and Arts Fair. Marks took photographs of these events and concerts. The photographs are preserved in the collection and became sought after in international publications.

In South Africa, Marks was soon immersed in the music scenes of Hillbrow, Johannesburg and Durban, producing studio recordings as well as recording live events and performances at the Jabulani Amphitheatre, the Totem at the Palm Beach Hotel in Durban, the Chelsea Theatre, the Ox Box, La Plaza, the New Troubadour, Mangles, and Le Chaim, Dorkay House, Bantu Men's Social Club and the Market Theatre Café. Throughout his career, Marks amassed a collection of material that documents South African music from the mid-1960s to the early 2000s. The collection grew and today holds more than 3000 reel-to-reel tapes, 4000 cassette tapes, 6000 vinyl records, 28 000 photographs and many documents, posters, programmes and other related material.

Marks had a habit of recording whenever he was near the mixer, letting the tape run to record whatever was happening around him. This means that Marks’ recordings provide insight into the folk clubs, jazz restaurants, and music festivals in South Africa, Botswana, Zimbabwe, Swaziland, and Lesotho during the 1970s and 1980s, he was involved with. Some of the musicians recorded in this collection includes Malombo, Johnny Clegg and Sipho Mchunu, Laurika Rauch, John Oakley Smith, Allen Kwela, Colin Shamley, Roger Lucey, Mike Dickman, Hugh Masekela, Spirits Rejoice, the Malopoets, and Richard John Smith as well as African-American musicians including Brook Benton, Isaac Hayes, Jimmy Smith and Percy Sledge on their tours to South Africa in the 1970s.

== Funding and Support ==
The Hidden Years Music Archive has been supported by numerous institutions and foundations including the South African Music Rights Organisation (SAMRO), the National Lotteries Board (2001), the South African/Norwegian Education and Music Programme (MMINO, 2002–2004), and the National Research Foundation (2005–2008) for a project hosted at the University of KwaZulu-Natal. However, due to a lack of sustained funding and subsequent inefficient infrastructure and human capacity, the archive rapidly deteriorated.

In 2013 Marks donated the archive to Stellenbosch University where it is preserved at the Documentation Centre for Music. The project is managed by Lizabe Lambrechts, a Volkswagen Senior Researcher at the Africa Open Institute for Music, Research and Innovation. Funding and support for the project has since is donation largely been provided by the Volkswagen Foundation through a research grant, the Africa Open Institute and the Stellenbosch Library and Information Sciences. The project is also supported by Janet Topp Fargion, Lead Curator World Music at the British Library Sound Archive and Angela Impey, Music Department SOAS University of London.

In 2017, the name of the archive was changed to the Hidden Years Music Archive, abbreviated as Hidden Years.

== Notable Collections ==
- David Marks and 3rd Ear Music Company Collection
- Shifty Records Collection
- Roger Lucy Collection
- Jeremy Taylor Collection
- Darius and Catherine Brubeck Collection
- Des and Dawn Lindberg Collection
- Ben Segal Collection
- John Gregg Collection
- Vuleka Radio Collection
- Malopoets Collection
- Sheila Taylor Zimbabwean Folk Music Collection
- Clem Tholet Zimbabwean Folk Music Collection
- John Oakley-Smith Collection
