= Acer Studios =

- Company type: Private
- Industry: Music recording & Entertainment
- Genre: Instrumental, dance, funk, rock, pop
- Founded: 2002
- Headquarters: Hazel Grove, Greater Manchester, United Kingdom
- Key people: Tim Scott
- Products: Music
- Owner: Tim Scott
- Subsidiaries: Acer Records

Acer Studios is the personal project studio of the recording artist Tim Scott, located in Hazel Grove, Greater Manchester, England. It was established in November 2002.

Initially set up for the recording and release of Tim Scott's debut album Bald on the Inside in 2003, and as a front to administer the publishing and distribution rights of Tim Scott's solo compositions.

The favourable U.K. Guitar press reviews of Bald on the Inside gave opportunity for Scott to work alongside BBC Radio 1 DJ Judge Jules on the track "Puesta Del Sol" for Judge Jules debut artist album Proven Worldwide. While the initial idea was recorded at Jules studio in London, the final guitar tracks were subsequently re-recorded at Acer Studios.

The studio and the label interests were separated when the label name was changed to Acer Records, in order to separate the label and the underlying core company in 2008, by the release of Scott's second album Guitar Mashing.

== Recording discography ==
=== Studio albums ===
Year	Type	Album	Info
2003	CD/Download	Bald On The Inside	
2008	CD/Download	Guitar Mashing	
2011	Download	Ibiza Mayhem 2012	
2013	Download	Retrospective Guitar Mashing	
2013	Download	Guitar Mashing Decade	

=== EPs ===
Year	Type	EP	Info
2011	Download	Ibiza Mayhem	
2012	Download	Magnesium Black	

=== Singles ===
Year	Type	Single	Info
2009	Download	"4:AM"	
2009	Download	"Angel Dust"	
2009	CD/Download	"Amy Jane"	
2010	Download	"Cosmic Ignition"	
2010	Download	"Cataclysmic Pink"	
2011	Download	"One Life"	
2011	Download	"Rio Gold Dust"	
2011	Download	"Dirty Mule"	
2012	Download	"Rok1"	
2012	Download	"Jelly Skeletons"	
2012	Download	"Skye Surfing"	
2012	Download	"I Found Love"	
2013	Download	"Fly Away" [feat. Ruthybabez]	
2013	Download	"I Don't Wanna Be"	
2013	Download	"Harmonic Elevator"	

== Collaborative recording discography ==
=== Studio albums ===
Year	Type	Album	Artist	Track Info
2006	CD/Download	Proven Worldwide	Judge Jules	"Puesta Del Sol" (Track 6) - features a Flamenco Guitar melody written and played by Tim Scott - recorded at Acer Studios allmusic "Proven Worldwide"
2009	CD/Download	Bring The Noise	Judge Jules	"City Rockers (Marcus Twiddle Edit)" (Track 8) - features the guitar melody from "Ibiza's Secret Garden" - (Track 2) on Tim Scott's Guitar Mashing album

=== Singles ===
Year	Type	Single	Artist	Track Info
2006	CD/Download	"Grace of God"	One Hit Wonders	"Serial Diva Remix" (Track 5) - features a rolling bass line written played and recorded by Tim Scott at Acer Studios Discogs "Grace Of God"
