= Amy Jane =

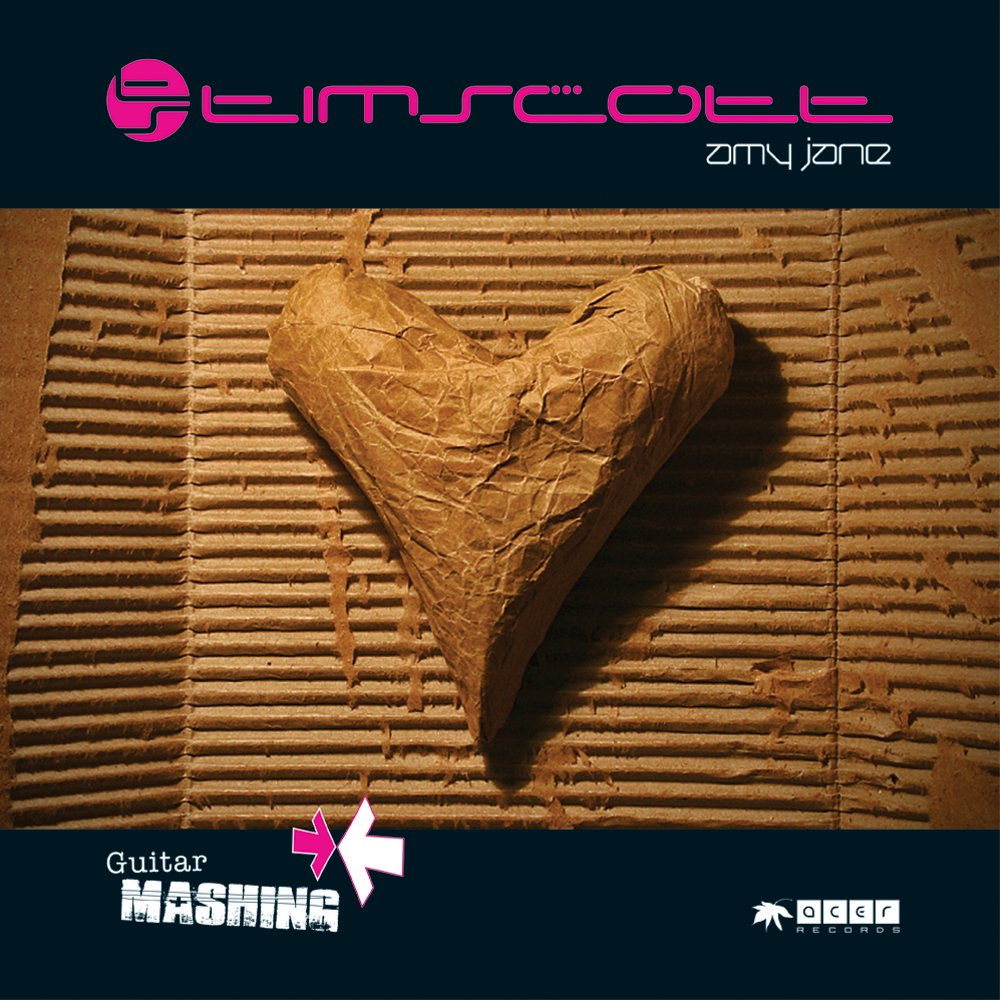

Single by Tim Scott
- B-side: "Angel Dust (Naked Sunset Mix)"
- Released: 9 November 2009
- Recorded: 2009 at Acer Studios (Hazel Grove, Greater Manchester)
- Genre: Instrumental, Dance, Pop, Post-rock
- Length: 22:28
- Label: Acer; ACERCDS001; 5060187620007; LC-19105
- Songwriter: Timothy David Scott
- Producer: Tim Scott

Tim Scott singles chronology
"'Angel Dust'" (2009)	"Amy Jane" (2009)	"'Cosmic Ignition'" (2010)

Professional ratings
Review scores
Source	Rating
Total Guitar	(favourable)
CityLife	3/5 stars
Sound on Sound	(favourable)

Amy Jane is the third single to be produced by multi-instrumentalist/composer Tim Scott, first released on 9 November 2009.

The cover features a heart sculpted out of a brown paper bag from a fast food chain set in a stripped corrugated cardboard box, shadowed by spotlight, intended to represent how relationships have become more of a disposable commodity in today's society.

Like Guitar Mashing it features a fictional dictionary definition for the term Guitar Mashing which is in part derived from the official Oxford English Dictionary definitions for the words Guitar and Mash but heavily distorted for use as a propaganda tool in marketing the single's unusual genre and so no longer has any true meaning.

The single was recorded and mixed at Acer Studios in Greater Manchester by Tim Scott and mastered on 6 October 2009 by Geoff Pesche at Abbey Road Studios, London.

== Critical reception ==
Charting at No. 9 in Total Guitar's top 10 recommended tracks to download in the December/Christmas 2009 edition; production editor - Lucy Rice of gave the song a positive review stating:

"Refreshing Instrumental mix from mashup man whose guitar heart lies in the party isle of Ibiza"

Sarah Walters of CityLife gave the song a positive review stating:

"If Cliff can sell pop to Christmas then there’s no reason why Tim Scott can’t flog Steve Vai-type guitar noodling to Ibiza. Backed by a distinctly Judge Jules–like dance beat, Amy Jane is made for mash ups, particularly the track’s howling riff and uber-rock power chords."

Sam Inglis of Sound on Sound (magazine) gave the song a positive review stating:

"Tim’s unique brand of ‘Trance/Rock/Progressive house’. Which, it turns out, is rather enjoyable. The production is slick in the extreme, with greater emphasis on ‘real’ instruments than is typical of the trance or house genres. In particular, it’s a neat showcase for Tim’s imaginative and often funky electric guitar playing. It doesn’t fit in the more rigid house and trance templates, but it would be a shame if that denies it club play."

== Formats and track listings ==
=== CD maxi single ===
No.	Title	Writer(s)	Length
1.	"Amy Jane (Radio Edit)"	Tim Scott	3:35
2.	"Amy Jane (Extended Chaos Mix)"	Tim Scott	5:25
3.	"Amy Jane (Disco Strings Edit)"	Tim Scott	3:37
4.	"Angel Dust (Naked Sunset Mix) (CD only)"	Tim Scott	9:43

=== Download single ===
No.	Title	Writer(s)	Length
1.	"Amy Jane (Radio Edit)"	Tim Scott	3:35
2.	"Amy Jane (Extended Chaos Mix)"	Tim Scott	5:25
3.	"Amy Jane (Disco Strings Edit)"	Tim Scott	3:37

== Personnel ==
- Tim Scott – lead guitar, rhythm guitar, bass guitar, synth, drums, percussion, drum programming

=== Production ===
- Tim Scott – producer, engineer, mixing
- Geoff Pesche – mastering
- Laura Turner – artwork
- Tim Scott – photography

== Release history ==
Region	Date	Format	Label
United Kingdom	9 November 2009	Digital download	Acer Records
United Kingdom	17 November 2009	CD single	Acer Records
