= Guitar Mashing =

Studio album by Tim Scott
- Released: 26 November 2008 (UK)
- Recorded: 2008 Acer Studios (Hazel Grove, Greater Manchester)
- Genre: Instrumental, Dance, Pop, Rock, Latin, Classical, Funk, Jazz Fusion
- Length: 45:48
- Label: Acer; TS944CD; 5060187629444; LC-19105 (UK, CD, 26 November 2008) (Download, 13 February 2009)
- Producer: Tim Scott

Tim Scott chronology
Bald on the Inside (2003)	Guitar Mashing (2008)	Ibiza Mayhem 2012 (2011)

Singles from Guitar Mashing
- 1. "Angel Dust" Released: 15 November 2009

Professional ratings
Review scores
Source	Rating
CityLife	3/5 stars
Guitarist (magazine)	4/5 stars
Total Guitar	3/5 stars
Guitar Techniques	4/5 stars
Guitar & Bass Magazine	(favourable)
Musician.	(favourable)
Stockport Express	(favourable)

Guitar Mashing is the second studio album produced by session guitarist and multi instrumentalist and composer Tim Scott, first released on 26 November 2008.

The album artwork features a fictional dictionary definition for the term Guitar Mashing which was in part derived from the official Oxford English Dictionary definitions for the words Guitar and Mash but heavily distorted for use as a propaganda tool to assist in marketing the album's unusual genre.

The album was recorded and mixed at Acer Studios in Greater Manchester by Tim Scott and was mastered by Geoff Pesche at Abbey Road Studios, London.

== Track listing ==
No.	Title	Writer(s)	Length
1.	"Angel Dust (Funky Bass Radio Edit)"	Tim Scott	3:37
2.	"Ibiza's Secret Garden (Original Radio Edit)"	Tim Scott	2:55
3.	"Love Parade (Radio Edit)"	Tim Scott	2:58
4.	"Tim Scott vs. J.S.Bach's Proper Prelude in C"	Tim Scott	2:58
5.	"Super Machiavellian"	Tim Scott	3:39
6.	"The Wonderland Gang (Dirty Radio Edit)"	Tim Scott	2:44
7.	"The After Show (Burlesque Radio Edit)"	Tim Scott	2:50
8.	"Pink and Chrome (The Sex Toy Mix)"	Tim Scott	4:10
9.	"Bank (The Central Line Mix)"	Tim Scott	4:38
10.	"Money = Cocaine Emptiness (Black Wednesday Mix)"	Tim Scott	5:48
11.	"Angel Dust (King of Guitar Mashing Club Mix)"	Tim Scott	7:59
12.	"Chasing The Dawn (Sunrise Mix)"	Tim Scott	1:22

== Personnel ==
Tim Scott Plays:

- Guitars: Electric Guitars, Acoustic Guitar, Spanish Classical Guitar, Slide Guitar, Talk Box Guitar, and Utterly Inspirational Whammy Wah Guitar
- Bass: Four & Five String Electric Bass Guitars Keyboards: Strings, Pads, Special Effects and Exclusive Sample Manipulation
- Vocals: Background Vocal Harmonies, Shouts, Whistles, Whispers and Effects
- Percussion: Tambourines, Indian Finger Cymbals, Bongos, Shakers, Claves, Chunky Silver Wrist Chain, Jam Bells, Tri-Tone Samba Whistle, Flex-A-Tone, Chimes, Air Horn, Vibra-Slap, Bell Tree, Castanets, Agogo Bells, Cabassa, Cowbells, Handclaps, Sambago Bells, Earth Plates, Jam Blocks, Steel & Chrome Kitchen Bin, Triangles and Finger Clicks
- Drums: KD Snare, Loblan Cowboy Boot Kick Drum Stomps, Zildjian Hi-Hats, Ride, Crash, Splash & China Trash Cymbals Electronic
- Drums & Drum Programming: Roland V-Drums arranged via midi on a Roland Fantom X6 Workstation and Sampler.
- All songs written, arranged & played by: Tim Scott
- All songs published by: (T. Scott) Acer Records (MCPS)
- Produced by: Tim Scott
- Recorded & mixed by: Tim Scott at Acer Studios, Greater Manchester

== Release history ==
Region	Date	Format	Label
United Kingdom	28 November 2008	CD	Acer Records
United Kingdom	9 November 2009	Digital download	Acer Records
