= John Oakley-Smith =

- Origin: Zimbabwe
- Genres: Folk & Rock music
- Instruments: Piano & Guitar
- Label: WEA
- Formerly of: The Elastic Head Band

John Oakley-Smith was a Rhodesian-born musician who obtained success in South Africa during the 1970s. Oakley-Smith performed at several South African venues such as the Troubadour and Chelsea Theatre but shied away from big stages. He released an album in 1976 called Matinees on Saturdays. Oakley-Smith was the musical director for productions of And Green And Golden, Cop-Out, Torch Song Trilogy, Madame Butterfly, Twelfth Night, or What You Will and performed in Ain't We Got Fun.

== Biography ==
John Oakley-Smith was born in 1950 in Rhodesia (now Zimbabwe) and lived a short time in Angola before coming to Cape Town, South Africa in 1970. At the age of 5, Oakley-Smith had an interest in playing the piano. He was encouraged to play by his mother who was also a pianist. However, at the age of 14, he broke his leg and could not play the piano for two years. At this point, he taught himself to play the guitar and despite his proficiency in the string instrument he still prefers the piano.

=== Career ===
Oakley-Smith went to the University of Cape Town where he began an arts degree. Before he could complete his degree, he was offered a job to write music for a witches' dance in a very obscure ballet production of "Dark of the Moon." By 1970, Oakley-Smith started living in Johannesburg and has since written the music for several plays, TV shows and films. Muff Andersson lists these ventures ""People" ... , "Stephan Bouwer's film "'n Bars Loop Deur die Wasbak" and "Katinka Heyns "'n Rand 'n Droom", "Story Time", "Lysistrata""

In 1976, he released his début album entitled Matinees on Saturdays, which was according to Leigh Hitchcock "met with wide acclaim even though it failed to get much airplay because the SABC placed a restriction on six of the songs." It is very difficult to categorise John Oakley-Smith's music, but Mike Waddacor attempted by stating that he "executes a hybrid folk style divorced from mainstream contemporary idioms." His lyrics ultimately consisted of a blend of social criticism, sarcasm and humour which was frowned upon by South African authorities.

Three years later, Oakley-Smith signed a songwriting contract with Warner Brothers and even performed at an international music convention on the Virgin Islands. The late-1970s and 1980s are marked by sporadic performances. During the 1970s John Oakley-Smith along with Gikas Marks, David Marks, Mac, Leonie Hofmeyr and Mike Dickman also performed in a band called the Elastic Head Band. In the start of the 1980s, John Oakley-Smith performed in the "Roots and Shoots" show and the "Tribute to John Betjemen" in which he co-starred with actor Richard Haines at the Laager. In 1983 John Oakley returned to the stage after a two-year absence only to be met with an audience of 40 fans. His performance was met well by the audience with Oakley-Smith performing some of his songs from the Matinees on Saturday Collection as well as some new material.

Throughout his career John Oakley-Smith performed at venues such as Mangles Theatre, The Troubadour, The Chelsea Theatre, and Market Theatre Café. Waddacor remarked that "Oakley-Smith may play music that could become increasingly inaccessible with changing musical tastes, but he remains, nevertheless, an admirable individualist playing beautiful music." Oakley-Smith went back to Zimbabwe in the 1980s and there retired from public life as a performing musician.

Despite his obscurity as a performer in his own right, he continued with numerous works in various fields.

In the early and late 1990s John spent time working with renowned theatre director Glen Walford in London, consulting on and composing for numerous productions in London, Ludlow and Vienna. These included Shakespeare's Much Ado About Nothing (produced under the Royal Shakespeare Company), and a reimagining of "The Picture of Dorian Gray" and others.

In the easy 2000s John worked as a music and cultural teacher at Hillcrest College in Phenalonga in Zimbabwe.

After retiring as a teacher John completed a book titled "If I Should Die Before I Wake" which is awaiting publication. It was an investigative piece examining the massacre of some young men in Sea Point, Cape Town in the same decade.

Between 2009 and 2010 John edited the "The Emergency Bouzouki Player" by Andrew Brel, published in 2010.

His last two draft works focused on at corruption in and around his hometown of Mutare Zimbabwe ("Diamond City Blues") as well as a biographical looking at a prominent Rhodesian family he was commissioned to assist with as a non credited author.

=== Personal life and death ===
He was married to Theresa Oakley-Smith and had one son John Lucien Oakley-Smith. Oakley-Smith was found murdered at his home in Mutare, Zimbabwe after a home invasion in 2021. He served as a mentor to many young pianists and musicians in Mutare until the time of his death.

Archive

Oakley-Smith donated his archival material including photographs, vinyl records, letters and documents, to the Hidden Years Music Archive, preserved at the Documentation Centre for Music, Stellenbosch University in 2017.

== Discography ==
John Oakley-Smith produced an album through WEA in 1976 called Matinees on Saturdays.

Track Listing
No.	Title	Length
1.	"The lady from the Odeon"	3:30
2.	"Comedy morning"	2:20
3.	"Saturday night"	1:58
4.	"Interlude"	1:13
5.	"Sunday"	2:14
6.	"Song to Lago"	3:10
7.	"Invisible poem/Celebration"	2:38
8.	"Snakes and ladders"	2:17
9.	"The Drifter And The Light Bill"	2:36
10.	"Dogs"	3:23
11.	"God Keep The People (Who Stay Awake At Night)"	2:20
12.	"The March Of The Kleenies"	2:20
13.	"Benjamin Street"	3:54
