= Bald on the Inside =

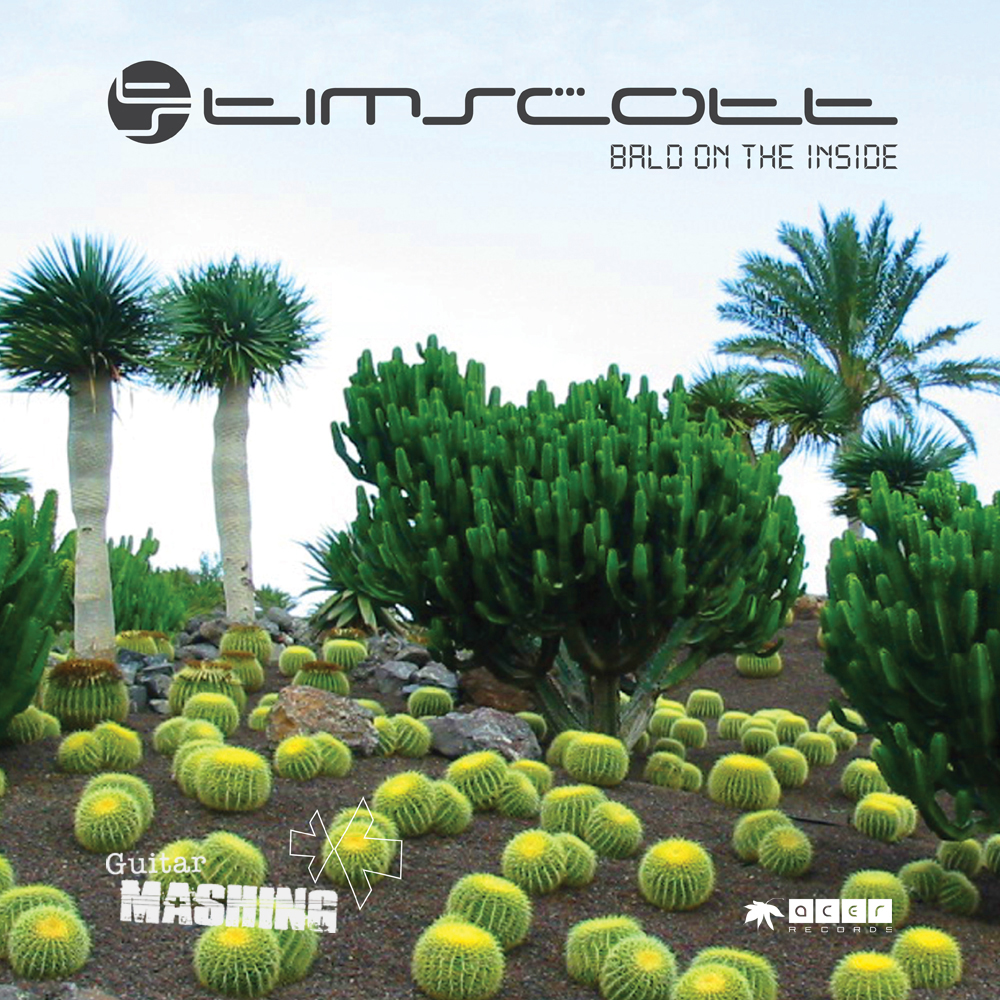

Studio album by Tim Scott
- Released: 23 June 2003
- Recorded: 2002–2003
- Studio: Acer Studios
- Genre: Instrumental, pop, experimental, fusion
- Length: 43:06
- Label: Acer
- Producer: Tim Scott

Tim Scott chronology
Bald on the Inside (2003)	Guitar Mashing (2008)

Singles from Bald on the Inside
- 1. "4:AM" Released: 30 November 2009

Professional ratings
Review scores
Source	Rating
Guitarist (magazine)	3/5 stars
Guitar Techniques	3/5 stars
Guitar & Bass Magazine	favourable

Bald on the Inside is the debut album by session guitarist Tim Scott, first released on 23 June 2003. First digitally released on iTunes, with an updated cover image, on 9 November 2009. Scott wrote, recorded, and produced the album at Acer Studios, his self built recording facility in much the same way as Mike Oldfield's – Tubular Bells and Jean Michel Jarre's - Oxygène. It was mastered by Roger Boden at The Cottage Group Studios, Macclesfield, Cheshire. 4:AM (4am And I Can't Sleep ) was released as a digital single on 30 November 2009.

== Critical reception ==
Ben Bartlett of Guitarist (magazine) gave the album a positive review stating:

"GI graduate shows some initiative, and some talent With Bald On The Inside, Guitar Institute graduate Tim Scott has produced a thoroughly listenable instrumental guitar/chill-out record by himself. He's distributing the CD in Borders bookstores across the country and that kind of marketing savvy is a hint as to how the follically-challenged fret melter uses his noodle. Like a lot of instrumental records Bald On The Inside showcases a vast array of playing techniques, ranging from Jeff Beck's vocal tremolo arm mastery and Joe Satriani's up-tempo boogie style through to Tommy Bolin phrasing and Steve Vai-style melodic rock. This is impressive, world-class stuff and if you like great guitar playing you should definitely check it out."

Cliff Douse of Guitar Techniques magazine gave this album a favourable review stating:

"An graduate from the Guitar Institute in London, Tim Scott has since worked as a session musician and played in numerous bands. His debut album, Bald On The Inside, is an intriguing selection of instrumental rock numbers. There are some discernable elements of Steve Vai and Joe Satriani in Tim's playing but he has incorporated them into a style of his own. None of the other tracks matches up to the fantastic opener but there's still plenty of cool guitar playing and new ideas on offer to make this a worthwhile, listenable album."

Jenny Knight of Guitar & Bass Magazine (magazine) gave this album a positive review stating:

"This instrumental album from the Mancunian graduate of London's Guitar Institute shows that while he's learned from such legends as Steve Lukather and Joe Satriani, he's very much his own man. And His fretting skills are more than capable of taming the wild mix of blues, classical, rock and flamenco that pervades his music."

== Track listing ==
No.	Title	Writer(s)	Length
1.	"4am And I Can't Sleep (Until I Hear The Music)"	Tim Scott	5:10
2.	"Bald on the Inside"	Tim Scott	3:34
3.	"He's Got A Wig On"	Tim Scott	5:00
4.	"Friends In The Sky"	Tim Scott	4:22
5.	"Palm House"	Tim Scott	5:01
6.	"Exercises for Anoraks"	Tim Scott	3:19
7.	"New Moon on Sunday"	Tim Scott	3:15
8.	"Cactus Garden"	Tim Scott	4:37
9.	"Lala Ping Fork"	Tim Scott	3:09
10.	"Steel ¥"	Tim Scott	4:22
11.	"The Fair"	Tim Scott	1:15

== Personnel ==
- All musical paintings written, played, produced, engineered and mixed by Tim Scott at Acer Studios
- All songs published by: Timothy David Scott Acer Studios - MCPS

== Release history ==
Region	Date	Format	Label
United Kingdom	23 June 2003	CD	Acer Records
United Kingdom	9 November 2009	Digital download	Acer Records
