= Music Maker Publications =

Publishing company

Music Maker Publications is a publishing company established in Ely, Britain in 1986, that specialized in books and magazines relevant to the music industry. Magazines published by Music Maker have included Music Technology (later MT and The Mix), Guitarist, Guitar Techniques, Bassist, Rhythm, Home & Studio Recording, Home Keyboard Review (later Keyboard Review), and Hip Hop Connection.

Andrew Brel, who formed Bridge Recordings in 1989, promoted the distribution of Bridge albums through his association with Music Maker and its chairman, Terry Day. This enabled numerous successful promotions though the wide circulation of the magazine Guitarist.

In 1997 Terry Day and Dennis Hill sold Music Maker Publications, Ltd. in the UK to Future Publishing.

With the acquisition of NewBay Media (which bought former Miller Freeman Music assets from United Business Media in 2006) by Future plc, the U.S. and the U.K. rights to Rhythm were reunited.

== U.S. operations ==
In the late 1980s, it began publishing separate U.S. editions of three titles, "sharing about 25 percent of their content with their British counterparts". In the 1990s, the company faced some marketing difficulties brought on by "stiff competition from its rivals in the United States (and a general down turn in the synthesizer market)", and consequently "was forced to allow its U.S. edition of Music Technology to suspend independent operations and be absorbed by its more successful U.S. publication, Home & Studio Recording". In the fall of 1990, Music Maker entered into an agreement with Miller Freeman, Inc., under which the latter "would take over the publication of Rhythm (U.S.), while continuing to share some of its editorial content with the U.K. edition". Hip Hop Connection was later sold to Future plc, in Bath.

In 1992, Tom Hawley was elected President of the corporation and soon moved the offices back to a facility in Canoga Park, just 2 blocks from the original offices.

Responding to a growing need within the pro audio industry, Music Maker Publications launched a Spanish language edition of Home & Studio Recording in 1993. Broadening its editorial scope, the magazine was later re-titled as Músico Pro in 1996.

On 17 January 1994 the Northridge earthquake devastated the offices of Music Maker Publications. Overcoming the destruction and piecing the office back together from the wreckage, the employees of MMP persevered and didn’t miss a single issue—a true testimony to the dedication and determination of the company’s employees. Beginning with the July 1994 issue the “Home & Studio” was dropped from the magazine’s title. Recording soon garnered a new level of respect and prominence in the pro-audio industry. In February 1996 Brent Heintz was elected to the office of Vice President and promoted to the position of Associate Publisher.

In May 1996 Music Maker Publications relocated its offices to Boulder, Colorado. The move was prompted by the 1994 earthquake and subsequent events in California that made the idea of greener pastures very appealing. Several locations were scouted and Boulder was selected for a number of reasons including the local music scene, the university and the lifestyle in general provided by the area.

In May 1999 Brent Heintz was made a full partner in Music Maker Publications, Inc., and in September 2002 Tom Hawley and Brent Heintz became the sole owners of Music Maker Publications, Inc.

== Editorial ==
In December 1992, Lorenz Rychner joined the editorial staff of Home & Studio Recording, bringing with him a lifetime of experience as a recording musician, author and teacher (at the esteemed Grove School of Music). Rychner was largely responsible for the creation of Playback, a series of content CDs bundled with the magazine in the late 1990s and early 2000s.

Dr. Mike Metlay joined the editorial team in April 1996 with the official title of "Assistant Editor/Nuclear Physicist", a humorous nod to his previous career in science. With the departure of 1990s-era Editor Nick Batzdorf in 2001, Associate Editor Lorenz Rychner was promoted to Editor, and with Rychner's retirement in 2014, Metlay took on the position of Editor. Upon Metlay's departure to launch a private editorial consultancy firm in 2019, former Technical Editor and world-renowned recording artist Paul Vnuk Jr. became Editor.

As of 2023, Vnuk remains the Editor of Recording, supported by Associate Editor Alex Hawley, guitarist, recording engineer, and son of Publisher Tom Hawley.
