= David Marks (songwriter) =

- Birth name: David Holland
- Also known as: Spiros David Markantonatos
- Born: 12 February 1944 (age 81)
- Occupation(s): Guitarist, vocalist, record producer, publisher, sound engineer, author
- Instruments: Guitar; Vocals; Bass guitar; Harmonica

David Marks is a South African-born songwriter, singer, producer, music archivist, and publisher who has been a member of the South African music industry since the 1970s. He spent much of his early career mixing, recording, releasing, and archiving a broad cross-spectrum of South African music.

Marks achieved success with his songwriting, penning some international hits, most notably "Master Jack", "Mr. Nico", and "Hey Mister"—songs that Marks wrote prior to 1967 whilst working underground in South Africa’s Free State gold mines. Marks is also known for his work as a sound engineer and director of the 3rd Ear Music Company.

== Living Legacy ==
Marks amassed a collection of material that documents South African music from the mid 1960s to the early 2000s. In 1990 Marks formed the Hidden Years Music Archive Project to safeguard and preserve the material he collected. The collection has been estimated to contain around 175 000 items, amounting to seven tons of material that documents diverse musical styles ranging from urban folk to township jazz, country rock, choirs, maskanda and traditional musics.

This collection was donated to the Documentation Centre for Music at Stellenbosch Universityin 2013 where it is managed by Dr Lizabé Lambrechts in collaboration with Marks.
