= Andrew Brel =

UK author

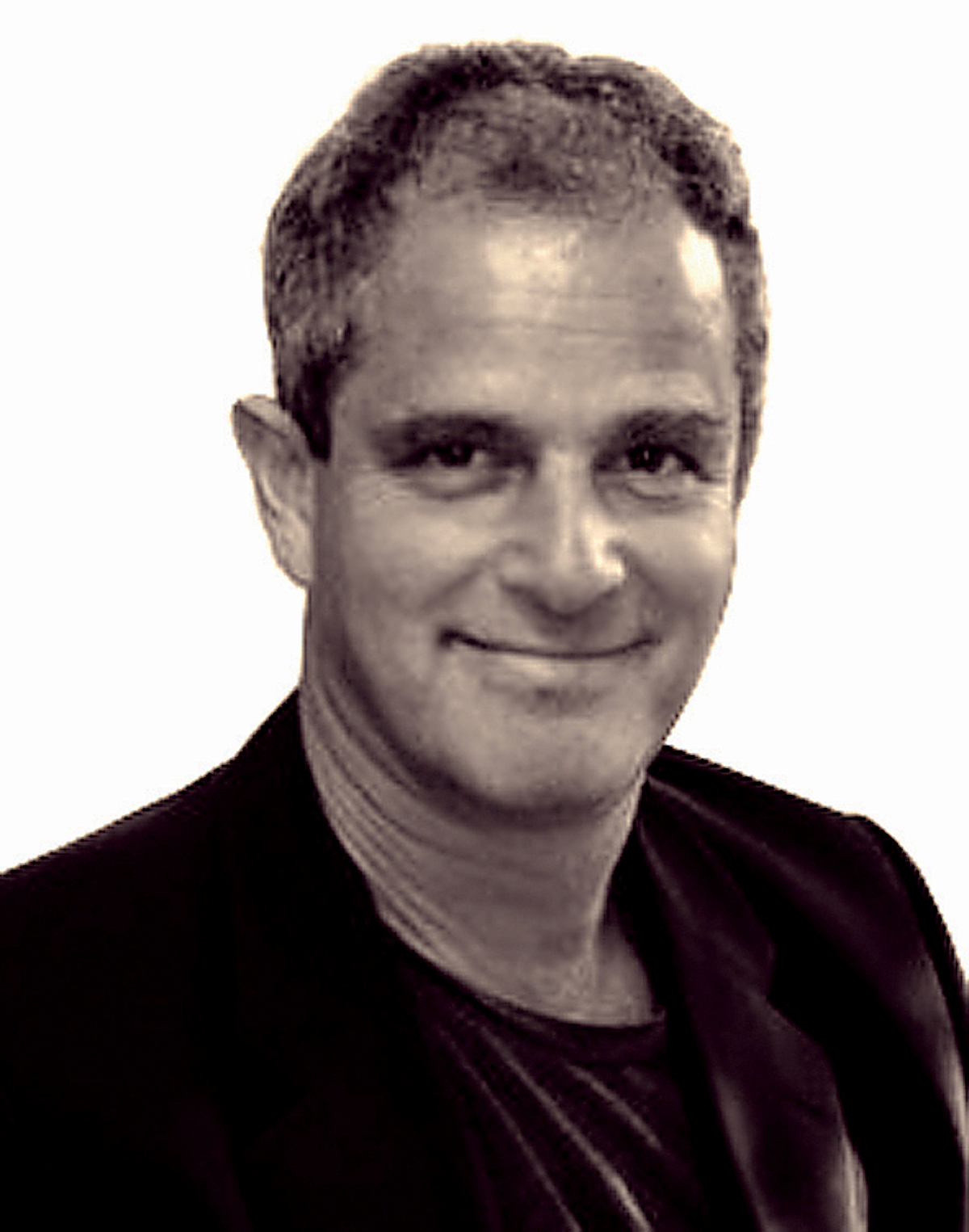

Background information
- Born: Andreas Broulidakis; 28 September 1960 (age 65); Johannesburg, South Africa
- Origin: London, England
- Genres: New-age, meditation, wellness
- Occupations: Composer, Music producer, Author
- Instruments: Guitar, Bouzouki
- Years active: 1979–present
- Website: www.andrewbrel.com

Andrew Brel is an author whose work includes The Emergency Bouzouki Player and One Day in Paris and a professional musician for over forty years. He has released 16 albums of meditation music since 2001.

== Early life ==
Brel was born to Greek parents in the South African suburb of Bryanston, one of Johannesburg's whites-only areas in 1960. His father was Manoussos Broulidakis, originally from Sfakia, a Cretan village on the South of the Island notable for its resistance during the Ottoman occupation. Sfakia was the extraction point for the Allied troops caught up in the surprise invasion of Crete by the Nazis in 1941.

After emigrating to South Africa in 1934, Manos volunteered for the South African army in 1939, serving for the duration of WW2 in North Africa and Italy.

Manos married Helen Evangelou in 1956. They had three children. Katerina, born 1958, Andreas born 1960 and Christina born 1966. The family lived in Linksfield Ridge in what was the 'House of the Year in 1956. The house on Hannoben street was designed by Frank L. Jarret in 1951 "for Greek timber merchant Manos Broulidakis, who spared no expense in using the richest of timbers for its interiors." Manos sold The house on Hannoben street in 1960 to L.Ron Hubbard, when he relocated his Scientology business to South Africa.

The house that Manos built is currently listed as one of Johannesburg's hidden treasures of architecture as a museum called 'The Ron Hubbard House'. Manos Broulidakis' home was the first 1950's house to attain Heritage status in South Africa.

In 1960 Manos moved his family to Bryanston where Andreas grew up a native Greek speaker, attending Bryanston Primary, Bryanston High and Damelin College before completing first year at the University of the Witwatersrand medical school. Manos died in 1971 of a coronary thrombosis leaving Helen, 36, with three children and four dogs in a three-acre property with four servants. Andrew was 10, Katherine 12 and Christina 4. Each child would react differently to this early encounter with profound loss. Kathy became a professional ballerina who embraced Eastern mysticism, Andrew became a professional musician, and the youngest, Christine, became a successful lawyer.

== Conscription into the SADF ==
In 1979, having just turned 18, Brel was forcibly conscripted into the South African Army for two years during the height of the Border War. Brel was from the outset a refusenik in uniform, unwilling to participate in any militant activity on the basis that "All I can do is play the guitar." Eventually he became the guitarist in the accomplished SADF Entertainment Corps show band, a seat once occupied by Trevor Rabin. Brel toured the Country, often appearing as the musical entertainment for Government functions. In 1980 Brel toured the SADF camps on the Angolan Border, performing with several of South Africa's popular musical stars of the era on morale boosting concerts for the troops. During these visits to the war zone he experienced first hand the traumatized reality of the average 18-year-old troops reaction to firefights and the ethical debasement that accompanies all out war.
In this guise, Entertainment Corps guitarist with the rank of Bandsman, he met and entertained several of South Africa's significant Apartheid leaders, including Minister of Defence, Magnus Malan and Minister of Police Jimmy Kruger. Kruger had only recently overseen the horrible death of Steve Biko, commenting on his demise with "It leaves me cold". Awareness of the personalities he was entertaining sat heavily on the anti-fascist young Brel.
In 1980, as a 19-year-old troop in military uniform he found himself unexpectedly face to face with South African Prime Minister P. W. Botha during a Government Dinner/Dance function honoring an Argentine delegation, where he narrowly escaped punitive consequences after insulting the Prime Minister then claimed he was "Speaking Greek."

This encounter with P.W Botha was one of many instances of non-violent protest that characterized an unhappy, traumatic period of living under and resenting the rule of the Christian Apartheid regime.

After being discharged from two years of national service in December of 1980, in order to avoid the camp system in which conscripts were required to return to the border annually for fighting service, Brel returned to formal education which provided exemption from Camps. He completed three years of Computer Science while developing musical skills performing as a solo musician at many of South Africa's then thriving live music venues. Brel averaged six shows a week between 1981 and 1985.

In 1981, at the outset of a career as a professional musician, acting on the advice of booking agent Edith Goldstein, who explained the commercial difficulties attached to booking Andreas Broulidakis he adopted a shortened version of his name, appearing professionally as Andy Brel for the first time in 1981. His first professional contract, the Quirinale Hotel in Hillbrow was for three-months, performing solo with foot bass pedals and a drum box, for four hours, five nights weekly.
Between 1981 and 1985, Brel averaged over 300 paid appearances annually whilst a full-time student, earning positive reviews on numerous occasions in The Star, then the most widely circulated news publication in South Africa. During this time he experienced undiagnosed PTSD, which led to a formal interest in learning about Post Traumatic Stress Disorder and then sharing information about the condition in published articles that have been referenced in treatment programs in South Africa.

During the Apartheid era of South Africa an entire generation of white South African born males was required to serve in the military during the twenty-three year Angolan Border war. The majority of conscripts were 18-year old school leavers for whom there was no alternative than to fight for the survival of the Apartheid regime. Although thousands died in the conflict many more on both sides carried the psychological scars forward, impacting significantly on the Countries political and social transition away from white minority rule.

== Emigration ==
In 1985, aged 24 and with some skills as a performing and recording musician, Brel left Apartheid South Africa for a new life in England, arriving with a total of £1,500 and no plan beyond playing music for money. At that time Greece was a half member of the EU, entitling Greek passport holder Brel to the right of residence in the UK.

Brel was well received from the outset in the UK where his one-man show led to a stream of bookings on the Pub and club circuit. Soon after arrival he began a 3-year Saturday night 'sold-out' stint at Bo-Jangles, a wine bar owned by a music Industry personality in Hampton Wick, South West London. Bo Jangles was at that time a trending in-place for musicians where being the featured attraction every Saturday night led to many musical introductions and album recording opportunities. Providing the social network that formed the start of a new life in the UK.

Within one year of arriving in the UK, aged 25 in 1986, Brel bought his first home on the Thames Riverbank near Hampton Court in the picturesque Surrey village of East Molesey.

From 1986 until 1991 he owned and operated Hampton Court Studios at Number 3 Bridge Road, East Molesey, working as a music writer and producer, developing new talent and creating original musical copyrights. This period included producing the original demos of the Dogs D'Amour which led to their record deal with China Records, launching a colorful chapter in British cartoon Rock and Roll. After 8-hour studio sessions on most days, in the evenings Brel continued public performances as a guitarist/singer, increasingly in duo context with musicians including Duncan Mackay (10cc), John Edwards (Status Quo) and Ronnie Johnson (Van Morrison).

Throughout the 1980s, at a time when the UK enjoyed a thriving live music culture in the smoky pubs where people would meet and socialize, Brel averaged six nights a week of live gigs in many of London's most musical pub gigs and five full-price sessions a week in Hampton Court Studios.

== Bridge Recordings ==
In 1989, Brel formed a record label, Bridge Recordings with Charlie Morgan, then drummer with Elton John. Bridge Recordings was a pioneering model of an independent record label producing high quality recordings of accomplished musicians playing their own instruments with the ethos of 'Music by Musicians.' The goal with recordings was to perform 'studio live', all players playing together in the traditional style of the early recording studios. Most of the releases on Bridge represent first or second takes of the band playing live.

For Brel, starting the Production label was the alternative to continuing gigs in smoky pubs after the age of thirty. Having decided the lifestyle of a gigging musician did not favor prospects for longevity. Especially considering at that time gigging musicians in the UK would typically smoke and drink to an extent that what would by today's standards be considered excessive.

With all his attention shifted into recording and production of musical content, distribution of Bridge albums was enhanced by Brel's association with Music Maker Publications and its chairman Terry Day. A professional friendship that enabled numerous successful promotions for Bridge recordings though the wide circulation of the Music Maker flagship magazine 'Guitarist'.

In 1991 Music Maker leased one of the first T1 Internet connections in the UK and Brel established the Bridge Recordings web store which recorded the first instance of a CD sale via the Internet for Give Them Enough Rope by Ronnie Johnson.

During the 1990s this association with the largest publisher of music related magazines enabled co ventures between Brel and Terry Day that helped the careers of many guitar players and included starting the Guitarist Magazine 'Guitarist of the Year' competition, which gave unknown players the opportunity to perform live with top session musicians in front of an audience for the prize of publicity and a recording opportunity. Several of the participants in these shows have gone on to enjoy successful professional careers.

As a writer, Brel contributed numerous articles for publication in Music Maker titles including lengthy features on Manfred Mann, and songwriter Terry Britten.

From 1992, Brel produced all cover-mount CD's for all Terry Days publications under the Music Maker banner including Guitarist magazine and Guitar Techniques magazine. Containing new content each month by a variety of contributors that would include Martin Taylor and Guthrie Govan along with many of the top level of teachers and players in the UK. This conceptual idea, which began in a coffee meeting between Brel and Terry Day in Cambridge, provided a new and original approach to music tuition that has left a lasting legacy. During this period Brel also mastered every CD release and oversaw overall production in excess of 2 million CD's. Along with negotiating the license payment with the Copyright protection society, the MCPS, for the copyright compositions appearing on every one of the lessons contained on the CD's. The success of the CD cover mounts and the quality of the content improved magazine circulation and assisted with the eventual sale of the Music Maker brand to Future Publishing.

== Black Barn Studios ==
In 1995, Bridge Recordings expanded its production capability to include ownership of Black Barn Studios in Ripley, Surrey, the early home of Eric Clapton. With this high quality recording facility, Brel produced and released fifteen promoted albums, two with the SAS Band; Queen keyboard player Spike Edney's all star band featuring musicians including; Chris Thompson, Roger Taylor, Peter Green, Ian Anderson, Tony Hadley, Roy Wood and Paul Young. The 1997 release, the eponymously titled SAS Band album, also known as the 'Blue album' and the 2001 release "SAS Band Live". Brel played on and produced the live version of Richard O'Brien's classic 'Time Warp.
In 1998 Brel produced and released Leo Sayer's Live in London and Louis Ribeiro's Under African Skies.

By the late 1990s, several events conspired to end sustainability of the Bridge Recordings business model. The growth of home recording technology meant a decline in demand for high cost professional recording services, which along with the shrinking sales of musical CD's as a new generation followed the 'download for free' model, all but ended the business motivation to pay for recordings for a rapidly declining market increasingly unwilling to pay for content. As a result the studio was sold to one of its busiest clients, Paul Weller. Soon after Charlie Morgan left Elton John's band and moved to the United States where he resides in Nashville, while Terry Day sold Music Maker Publications.

== Personal life ==
Brel married Catherine Smith in 1986. They had one child, Manoussos John, born in Kingston-On-Thames in 1989. They divorced in 1992.

In 2009, his second son Byron Broulidakis was born in Kingston-On-Thames. Brel lives in California.

== Meditation music ==
In 2001, Brel's friendship with new age self-help author Diana Cooper led to a commission to write his first album in the genre of new-age meditation music "Angel Inspiration" was released by New World Music in 2001. The rewarding return from this first foray into new age meditation music provided incentive and opportunity to explore a lifelong passion for composing and producing music in this minimalist 'solfeggio' style resulting in 15 further releases by 2026. Brel made three albums in collaboration with the guitarist and composer Hugh Burns, including 2007's Seven Bach Meditations which explores the process of Brel's lifelong inspiration in music composition, J.S Bach, incorporating production values not available to the composer at that time.

Between 2002 and 2006, Brel recorded and produced a series of 15 spoken word meditation CDs with self-help author Diana Cooper which prominently feature his meditation music. The Diana Cooper meditation CD's remain popular choices in the spoken word meditation field, released by Findhorn Press and later licensed to Inner Traditions.

After the burglary of Riverbank Studios on June 16 2013 Brel moved to California, establishing Treadmill Studios in Laguna Beach as a production facility where his first new project was a collaboration with well known Phd music-educator and Pet Shop Boys producer Richard Niles.

In 2017, his eighth album was released, a solo effort called Meditation and Tranquility which produced a streaming media hit, called "Sol Serenity"'.

In 2019, Kumeka Vol II was released, 17 years after the first Music for Kumeka introduced this Chohan of the 8th Ray.

In 2019, Brel released a second album specifically for the 'Sleep Music genre' called Deep Sleep, widely used in YouTube videos providing for insomniacs. Deep Sleep has achieved many million's of streamed plays on Amazon Music and is Brel's most played album to date.

Brel uses Taylor guitars on all the meditation music albums, primarily a 2005 Taylor NS72 and a 2014 Taylor 814CE.

== Songwriting ==
Outside of the meditation music compositions, Brel has worked on several collaborations with guitarist and composer, Hugh Burns, including The Paradise Key in 2003 which recalled events in the Iran–Iraq War surrounding the religiously inspired 'human wave' attacks. A story shared by his friend Kaveh Golestan, the Iranian photojournalist whose coverage of the Iran Iraq war was syndicated to most significant media for the duration of that war.

Brel is the co writer of 'Alone' with Spike Edney, originally sung by Patti Russo and later recorded in California by Hugo Fernandes.

Brel is the co writer of 'Suburban House' with Josh Phillips, originally sung by Leo Sayer and later a hit in Ukraine for Ani Lorak.

Twenty-one of his most performed songs appear on the 2017 release Riverbank Songwriting including songs with Alan Tarney, Spike Edney, Hugh Burns and Josh Phillips.

In 2018, Brel wrote and produced What I Love by Hugo Fernandes. A seventeen-song album of acoustic guitar and voice, performed by Hugo Fernandes. Recorded in California and released by Andrew Brel Music on 15 September 2018. In 2025 Brel wrote and produced THE INCOMING STORM with Memphis artist Logan Twain, followed by a second album titled TWO.

== The Emergency Bouzouki Player ==
Brel's first book, The Emergency Bouzouki Player was published in 2011. ASIN: B00BTX1B9Q.
The book reflects a first hand account of conscription in the South African Army during the years of Apartheid. The long term social consequences of forced conscription and the PTSD generation that returned from the border war without any medical help are detailed.

South African writer and musician John Oakley-Smith described it as "A book that should be compulsory reading in every South African school." In June 2017, The Emergency Bouzouki Player was banned from sale in all seven Emirates of the UAE where Amazon sells books.

The 19 hour Audio Book of The Emergency Bouzouki Player was narrated by Andrew Brel for Audible.

== One Day in Paris ==
Brel's second book is a novel, ''One Day in Paris'' published in 2015. ASIN: B0135OSWGQ. The account of a fictitious attack on Paris masterminded by former British Army officer, Dan Blake, a skillful PTSD affected sociopath with superior intelligence. A prescient story-line examines how the American Military Industrial complex relies on new conflict to sustain growth. Described as "a close up look at the 1% who control the 1%" by Author and film-maker Stephen Trombley.

== Half the Story has never been told: Why we lie ==
Half the Story has never been told: Why we lie is a 2024 book and audiobook by Andrew Brel exploring themes of apartheid ideology, genocide, and geopolitical deception. Written from an anti-fascist, anti-war perspective, the work analyzes the drivers behind major historical conflicts.

== 'Adler v. Broulidakis (2015)' ==
Published in 2026, Brel's autobiographical experience of British law was a No. 1 best seller on Amazon in Family-Law for two weeks.

== Short stories by Brel ==
In 2023 Brel released Aunt Dorothy's Visit and Other Short Stories. Includes the only official biography of Krishna vardu Ghan.

== Discography ==
As producer:

1989 - Give them Enough Rope by Ronnie Johnson
1991 - Very Much Alive by Willy Finlayson and the Hurters. Featuring Mickey Moody
1993 - Blues Britannia by Various Artists including Peter Green, Mickey Moody, Cliff Aungier and Geoff Bradford
1995 - FleshDevils by Dino Archon, Jojo Alves and Charlie Morgan
1997 - Under African Skies by Louis Ribeiro and Jive Nation
1998 - Mindwash by Hugh Burns
1999 - SAS Band by Spike Edneys All stars feat Chris Thompson, Tony Hadley, Roger Taylor, Ian Anderson and Peter Green
2000 - Live in London by Leo Sayer
2001 - The Show by SAS Band. Featuring Chris Thompson, Roger Taylor, Roy Wood, Leo Sayer and Richard O'Brien
2018 - Riverbank Songwriting by Various artists
2018 - What I love by Hugo Fernandes 2025 - The Incoming Storm by Logan Twain 2025 - Two by Logan Twain

As composer/performer in meditation music.

2001 - Angel Inspiration
2002 - Music for Kumeka
2003 - Golden Atlantis
2004 - Angels and Unicorns (With Hugh Burns.)
2005 - Celtic Inspiration (With Hugh Burns.)
2007 - Seven Bach Meditations (With Hugh Burns.)
2014 - Laguna. Krishna vardu Ghan meditations. (With Richard Niles.)
2016 - Relaxation and Tranquility
2019 - Kumeka II
2019 - Deep Sleep
2020 - African Meditation
2021 - Calm
2023 - Deep Focus
2024 - Sleep
2025 - Crackling Fire, Falling Rain
2026 - Angel Inspiration. The 25 Year Anniversary Remix
