= Graham Newcater =

South African composer of serial music (born 1941)

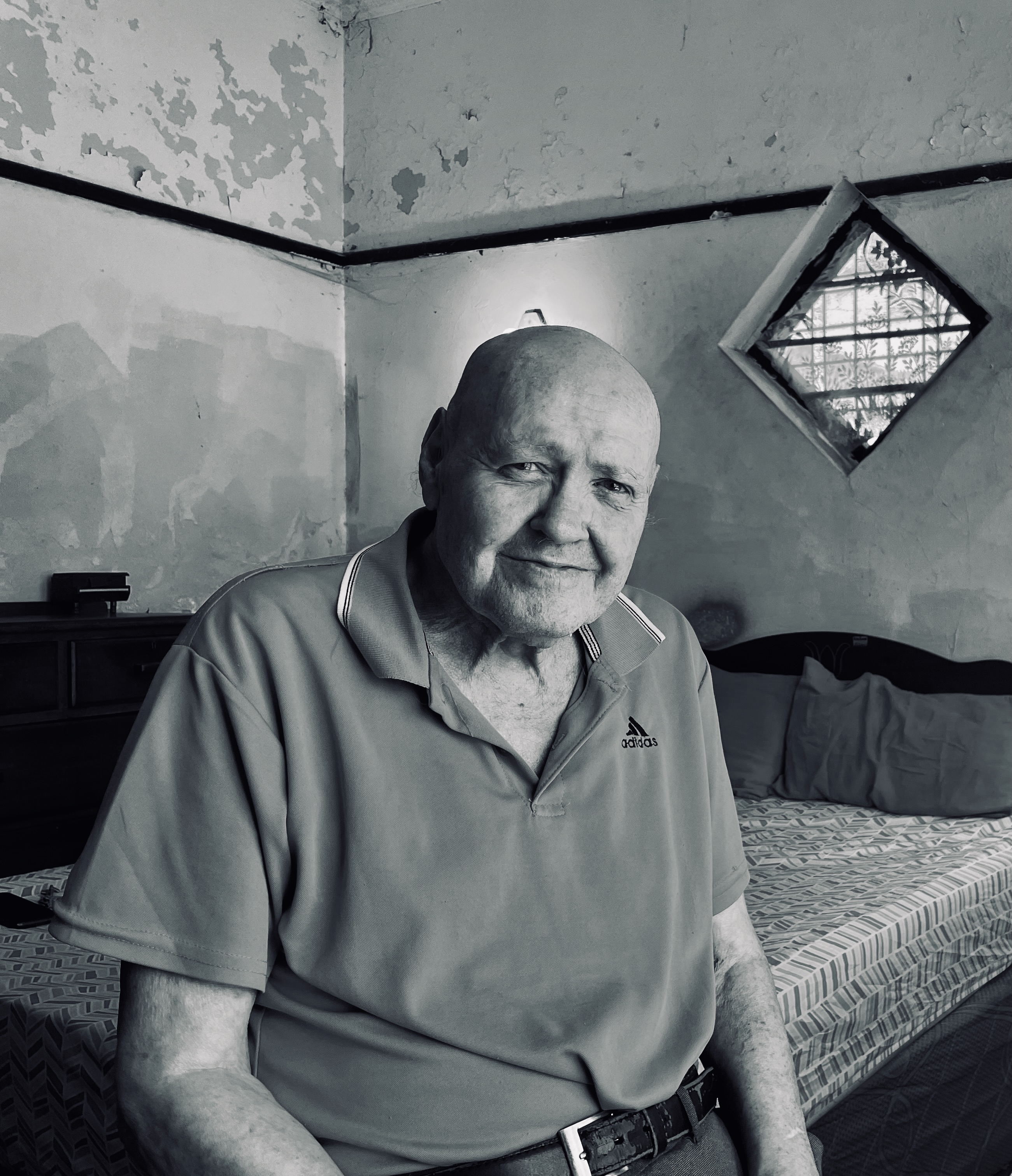

Background information
- Born: Graham Newcater; September 3, 1941 (age 84); Johannesburg, Transvaal, Union of South Africa
- Origin: South Africa
- Genres: Serialism, Twelve-tone technique, Modernist music
- Occupation: Composer
- Years active: 1950s–present

Graham Newcater (3 September 1941 - 6 May 2025) is a South African composer known for his use of serialism and the twelve-tone technique. His music draws heavily from European modernist traditions, making him a significant figure in South African classical music. While he employed twelve-tone sets, inspired by composers like Anton Webern, Newcater’s distinctive use of intervals—especially minor seconds and thirds—created a unique sound that set his works apart. Some of his most notable compositions include the ballet Raka, the String Quartet No. 1, and solo piano works. Unlike many of his contemporaries, Newcater abstained from engaging directly with South African cultural or musical identity, focusing on the abstract possibilities of serialism.

== Early life and education ==
Graham Newcater was born on 3 September 1941, in Johannesburg, Transvaal, Union of South Africa. He came from a family with a musical lineage, including an uncle who was a concert pianist, although the family's primary background was in engineering. Newcater pursued this trade initially, apprenticing as a motor mechanic from 1957 to 1960. His engineering background influenced his compositional approach, as he often emphasized "balance and proportions," drawing analogies between engineering and music.

Newcater began his musical training on the piano at thirteen but quickly became interested in wind instruments, particularly the clarinet. After moving to Durban in 1955, he received clarinet lessons from Arthur Tempest, the principal clarinetist of the Durban Civic Orchestra. His experiences with the orchestra and his personal challenges with clarinet technique prompted him to explore composition. During his teenage years, he wrote études and "sonatas" that reflected his developing technical and compositional skills.

Seeking theoretical and compositional guidance, Newcater contacted Erik Chisholm, which led to correspondence-based tuition with composer Arnold van Wyk from 1955 to 1957. This tutelage provided Newcater with an early grounding in music theory and orchestration.

In 1960, he returned to Johannesburg, where he began formal studies under conductor Gideon Fagan, who had rarely taken on private students. In 1962, he received a SAMRO bursary to study composition at the Royal College of Music in London. There, he studied under Peter Racine Fricker and took lessons in conducting, clarinet, and harpsichord. This period was crucial in shaping Newcater's compositional voice, focusing on the twelve-tone technique.

== Education and career in London ==
While studying in London between 1962 and 1964, Newcater composed several significant works. These included his First Symphony, a Concerto Grosso for Strings, and a Wind Quintet. The Concert Overture, completed during this period, was later lost. Some of his works were performed in London and broadcast in South Africa, helping to establish his reputation as a composer. He also studied privately with the twelve-tone composer Humphrey Searle. His work during this period was recognized with the Vaughan Williams Award, which allowed him to concentrate fully on his compositions.

Despite his achievements, Newcater's plans to remain in the UK were interrupted due to work permit issues. Consequently, he returned to South Africa in 1964, where he initially worked as a musical assistant at the South African Broadcasting Corporation (SABC).

== Return to South Africa ==
Upon his return, Newcater continued to build his compositional portfolio. In 1965, he traveled to Britain to attend a composition course with Humphrey Searle, where he received the Vaughan Williams Bursary. This acknowledgment solidified his commitment to the twelve-tone technique and serialist style.

During this period, he composed several major works, including the Second Symphony, created for the Republic Festival of 1966, Notturno for orchestra, and Variations de Timbres. His most defining work of the time was the ballet Raka (1967), based on N. P. van Wyk Louw's epic poem. Raka was a pioneering work in South African modernist music, demonstrating the expressive potential of serialism within a narrative context. Following Raka, Newcater was commissioned to write another ballet, Rain Queen (1968), further establishing his reputation.

Despite his success, Newcater frequently alternated between composing and working in the engineering trade. His view of composition as a craft, requiring careful construction and balance, echoed his engineering mindset.

== Compositional style ==
Graham Newcater's music is characterized by a strict yet flexible application of twelve-tone techniques. His engineering background influenced his approach to composition, focusing on structural integrity, balance, and precision. He often restricted his tone rows to specific intervals, such as minor seconds, minor thirds, major seconds, and major thirds, while avoiding perfect fourths and fifths. This selectivity created a unique sound world that set his music apart from other serialist works.

Newcater employed advanced twelve-tone techniques such as combinatoriality (where segments of a tone row create complementary sections) and invariance (preserving segments across row permutations). These methods contributed to thematic unity in his compositions, including Songs of the Inner Worlds. Despite his systematic approach, Newcater avoided the overwhelming dissonance often associated with serialism. Influenced by Anton Webern, he treated tone rows as sources for motives, which he developed thematically to allow expressive flexibility.

His String Quartet No. 1 (1964) is a prime example of his application of twelve-tone techniques. It explores symmetry and invariance, showcasing rigorous serialist structures while providing room for expressive flexibility through row manipulation and inversion.

In his later years, Newcater turned to solo piano music, composing works like the Sapphire Sonata (2016) and Chromatic Serpent (2016). According to musicologist Mareli Stolp, these pieces continue to explore twelve-tone techniques while remaining idiomatic for the piano, demonstrating Newcater's adaptability and ability to tailor serialist methods for performance.

== Performances and premieres ==
Newcater’s works were performed primarily in South Africa. His ballet Raka, premiered in 1967, was a notable event in South African music history, demonstrating the power of serialism in a dramatic setting. His other works, including symphonies, quartets, and piano pieces, were broadcast by the SABC, though his music remains relatively underrepresented internationally.

== Reception ==
During his career, Newcater’s music was both celebrated and challenged within the South African music community. His strict serialist approach contrasted with the cultural landscape, which often favored nationalist or Africanist styles incorporating indigenous elements. Although recognized in the 1960s and 1970s, his work became increasingly marginalized with the rise of Africanist art music. However, his dedication to abstract serialism has since been revisited and appreciated for its technical sophistication and unique contribution to South African art music.

== Works ==
The South African Music Encyclopaedia provides a detailed list of Newcater's works up to 1980:

- First Symphony (1962–64)
- Concerto Grosso for strings (1962)
- String Quartet No. 1 (1964)
- Raka (1967) – ballet based on N. P. van Wyk Louw's poem
- Second Symphony (1965)
- Variations de Timbres for orchestra (1968)
- Notturno for orchestra (1968)
- Rain Queen (1968/1969) – Ballet
- Songs of the Inner Worlds for orchestra
- Sapphire Sonata for piano (2016)
- Chromatic Serpent for piano (2016)

== Legacy and influence ==
Graham Newcater remains a significant figure in South African classical music and twentieth-century serialist composition. His works diverged from nationalist and Africanist trends, steadfastly pursuing a European-inspired twelve-tone compositional method. His Raka demonstrated how serialism could address complex narratives, challenging existing norms without directly invoking South African musical idioms. Despite later marginalization, his use of twelve-tone techniques represents a unique contribution to the country's art music.

However, the political implications of serial music during apartheid have been a subject of debate. The adoption of European avant-garde techniques like serialism by South African composers, including Newcater, contributed to the cultural exclusivity promoted by the apartheid regime. This compositional approach distanced South African art music from indigenous African musical traditions, reinforcing the segregationist policies of the era. The abstraction and complexity of serialism provided a veneer of artistic neutrality, which allowed it to flourish under state patronage while ignoring the sociopolitical realities of apartheid’s oppression and exclusion.

The Newcater Collection at the Documentation Centre for Music (DOMUS) at Stellenbosch University holds a significant selection of holograph scores and sketches, donated by the composer.
