= Africa Open Institute for Music, Research and Innovation =

Research institute in South Africa

Coordinates: 33.93098°S 18.86436°E

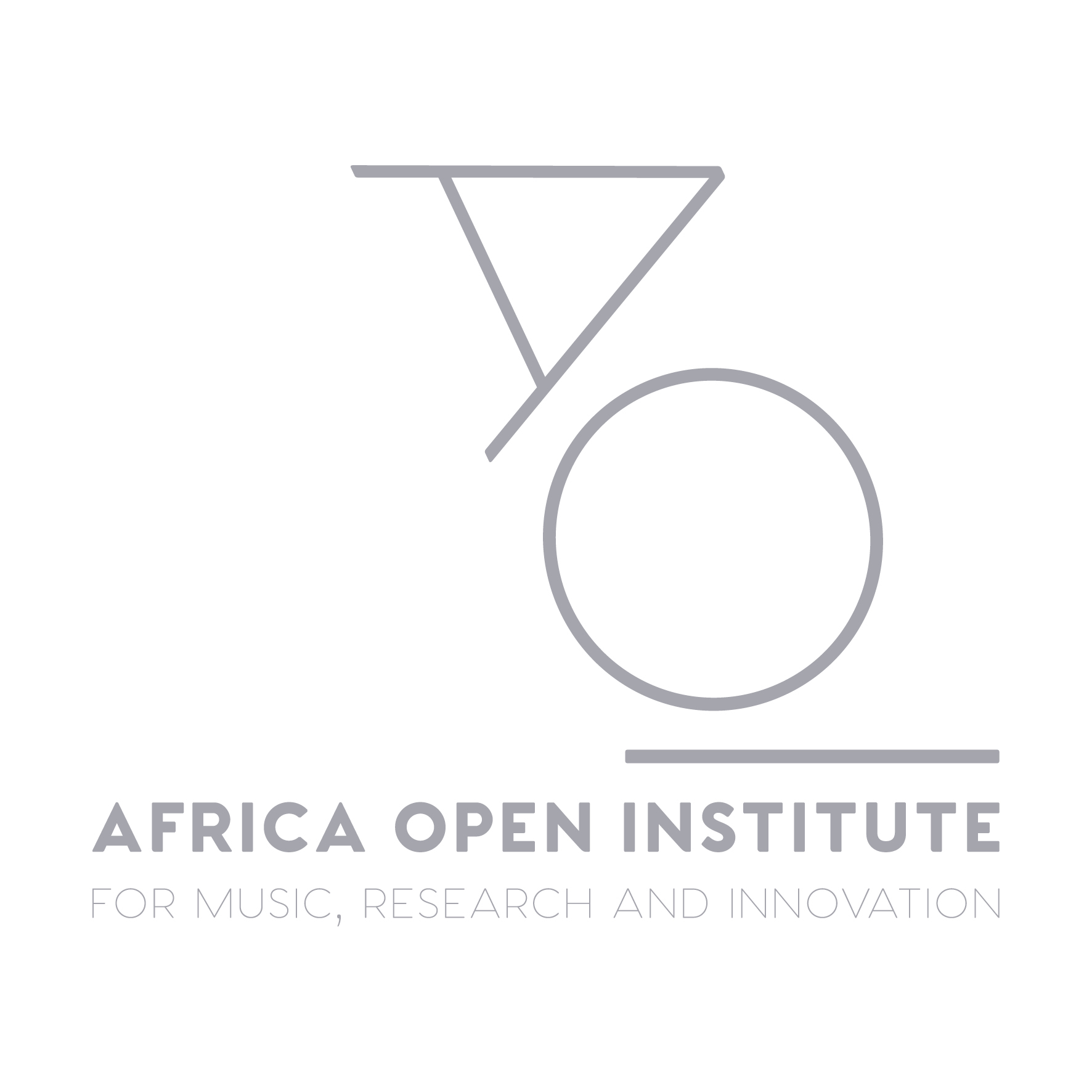
The logo of AOI

The Africa Open Institute for Music, Research and Innovation (AOI) at Stellenbosch University is an interdisciplinary research institute dedicated to music studies. Founded in 2016 by the music scholar and writer Stephanus Muller, the institute provides supervision to postgraduate fellows from a variety of disciplines and functions as an independent research hub in the Faculty of Arts and Social Sciences. Its mission is to create an institutional space for scholars and artists that encourages experimentation and risk taking. AOI's community include postgraduate and postdoctoral fellows, extraordinary professors, research associates, composers, performers, sonic residents, archival and heritage practitioners and international partners.

== History ==
AOI represents an institutional development of a research-based archive project aimed at collecting and preserving the collections of South African musicians and music scholars: the Documentation Centre for Music (DOMUS) at Stellenbosch University founded and headed by Stephanus Muller from 2005 to 2015. By 2015, DOMUS had acquired more than seventy collections that had served as a basis for articles in periodicals, conference papers, postgraduate theses, film screenings, recordings and performances. The archive thus played an important role in contributing to South African heritage and shaping debates on music in South Africa. Due to the scale of its acquisitions as well as institutional pressures, DOMUS was incorporated into a Special Collections Section of the Stellenbosch University Library and Information Services in 2015. A year later, Stephanus Muller founded AOI as a new, autonomous institute in the Faculty of Arts and Social Sciences at Stellenbosch University, continuing and extending the music research aspect of the original archive project.

The founding of AOI and its research agenda were also informed by concerns expressed by the Open Stellenbosch student collective, and the broader FeesMustFall movement. These concerns related to the politics of exclusion in curricula and research and what was perceived to be the racist ideologies of apartheid South Africa still prevalent at institutions of higher learning. AOI marked 'an institutional reaction to the potentially rejuvenating, potentially destructive energy' of the student movements, and 'an effort to encourage thinking and creative work that could lead to stronger and better universities'. It is therefore significant that the institute was established as an independent organizational research unit outside the Music Department and Conservatoire at Stellenbosch University.

== Projects ==
AOI has been funded by the Andrew W. Mellon Foundation (2016-2020) for a series of research projects entitled Delinking Encounters. These included an ambitious digitization project of music archives in the Documentation Centre for Music, a Sonic Residency programme, a critical edition project headed by Christine Lucia and focused on the music of Michael Mosoeu Moerane, and an interdisciplinary forum for popular music studies, IFPOP. Mellon funding further enabled the creation of an online digital publication spaceherri, curated by the writer and film maker Aryan Kaganof.

The institute is also host to the Hidden Years Music Archive, funded by the Volkswagen Foundation, and is an institutional partner of the ‘Cultural relations between Switzerland and South Africa (1948-1990)’ project, located at the Bern University of the Arts in Switzerland. AOI has partnered with the University of York on the Newton Fellowship programme, entitled ‘South African Jazz Cultures and the Archive’. As a result of this partnership the institute supervised renowned jazz pianists Kyle Shepherd and Nduduzo Makhathini to become the first recipients of MMus-degrees in jazz studies in the history of Stellenbosch University. The institute is also the institutional partner for the Sterkfontein Composers Meeting, for which it has also received funding from the South African National Institute for Humanities and Social Sciences (NIHSS).

In 2020, Africa Open Improvising, a free improvisational music collective, was launched. The collective is affiliated with and often does public performances at the Africa Open Institute.
