= Stephanus Muller =

South African music scholar (born 1971)

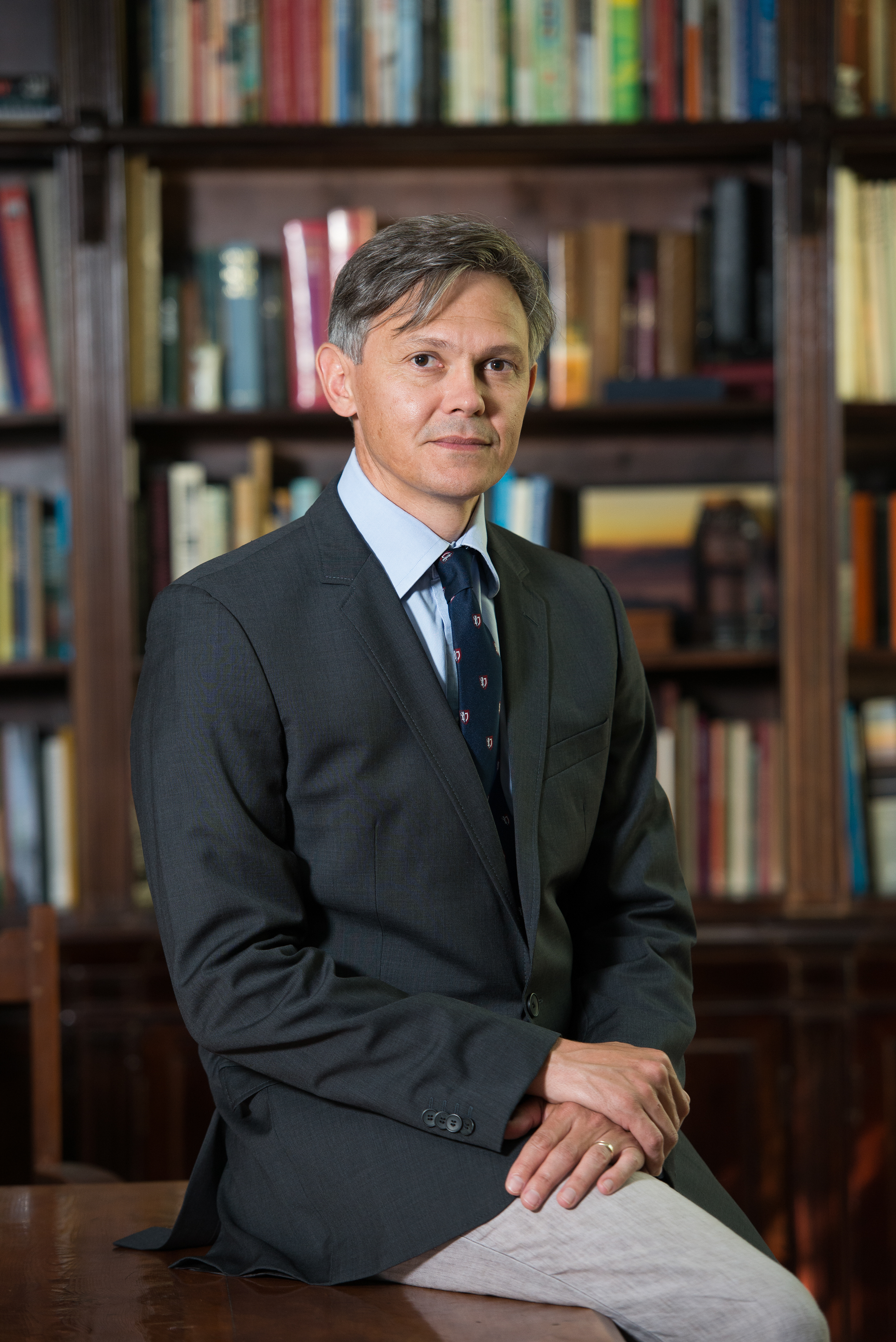
- Born: Stephanus Jacobus van Zyl Muller; 2 January 1971 (age 55); Pretoria
- Occupations: Director, Africa Open Institute for Music, Research and Innovation
- Years active: From 2016
- Title: Professor

Academic background
- Education: University of Pretoria, University of South Africa, University of Stellenbosch, University of Oxford

Academic work
- Institutions: Stellenbosch University

Stephanus Muller (born 2 January 1971, Pretoria) is a South African music scholar and writer who has written about South African twentieth-century composition, exile, archiving, language politics, music and apartheid and university institutional transformation. As the last chairman of the Musicological Society of Southern Africa, he was a founding member of the South African Society for Research in Music (SASRIM) in 2006. He also founded the Documentation Centre for Music (DOMUS) in 2005 at Stellenbosch University, and the Africa Open Institute for Music, Research and Innovation (AOI) at the same university in 2016. He received his BMus (performance) from Pretoria University in 1992, MMus (musicology) from the University of South Africa in 1998, and DPhil from the University of Oxford in 2001. Having studied with the writer Marlene van Niekerk, he also holds a MA in Creative Afrikaans writing from Stellenbosch University (2007).

== Career ==
Muller is Professor of Music and Director of Africa Open Institute for Music, Research and Innovation at Stellenbosch University, where he has held a lectureship in music since 2005.

His three-volume study of the South African composer Arnold van Wyk, entitled Nagmusiek (2014), drew heavily on decolonial and deconstructive theories of the archive and Paul Ricoeur’s narratological theories of mimesis to circumvent the problems of writing in Afrikaans about apartheid-era musical composition. Nagmusiek, written in Afrikaans and English, engages in a complex strategy of slipping into and out of fiction, documentary biography, conventional biography and autobiography, while performing a comprehensive listing and categorization of primary manuscript sources relating to Van Wyk music. The book has been described as a radical materialization of Walter Mignolo’s notion of ‘epistemic delinking’, and an enquiry into ‘the relationship between art, academia and fascism’. The book has received awards recognizing it both as an important work of fiction and as a form of non-fiction.

Muller's work to establish and develop the Documentation Centre for Music at Stellenbosch University has led to the acquisition of more than thirty music archives, many of which have subsequently led to important new research. The acquisition of the Eoan Group archive, for example, led to an important oral history project published by The Eoan Group Project as Eoan – Our Story, as well as a documentary film by Aryan Kaganof entitled An Inconsolable Memory (2013, 110 minutes). Apart from Kaganof, with whom he has also worked on the films Say it with Flowers (2017, 24 minutes) and Nagmusiek for you only (2015, 65 minutes), Muller has also written about and collaborated with many composers and performers, as well as the visual artists Roelof van Wyk and Manfred Zylla.

Muller has often written about social and political issues as these intersect with music history and aesthetics. Much of this writing has been for lay readers, especially in the decade he wrote for the Afrikaans newspaper, Die Burger. A specific example is the 2004 review of composer Hendrik Hofmeyr’s composition Sinfonia Africana, which led to a vigorous public debate about compositional aesthetics in post-apartheid South Africa. He has also been actively engaged in debates about the place of Afrikaans in post-apartheid South African tertiary institutions.

== Awards ==
- Suid-Afrikaanse Akademie vir Wetenskap en Kuns Eugène Marais Prize for a first or early belletristic work awarded to Nagmusiek, 2016.
- Andrew W. Mellon Foundation Award for a series of research projects entitled ‘Delinking Encounters’ (funding cycle of five years), 2015.
- Fowler-Hamilton Visiting Research Fellowship, Christ Church, Oxford, September to December 2015.
- Chancellor's Award for Research, Stellenbosch University, 2015.
- kykNET-Rapport Prize (non-fiction) awarded to Nagmusiek, 2015.
- Jan Rabie Rapport Prize for debut fiction awarded to Nagmusiek, 2015.
- University of Johannesburg Debut Prize for Creative Writing in Afrikaans for Nagmusiek, 2015.
- Newton Advanced Fellowship Award (with co-applicant Dr. Jonathan Eato from York University) for South African Jazz Cultures and the Archive, 2015.

== Books ==
- The Journey to the South (Stellenbosch: African SunMedia, 2019).
- Nagmusiek (Johannesburg: Fourthwall Books, 2014).
- Eoan – Our Story (Johannesburg: Fourthwall Books, 2013), eds. Hilde Roos and Wayne Muller, authored by the Eoan History Project.
- A Composer in Africa: Essays on the Life and Work of Stefans Grové (Stellenbosch: SUN Press, 2006), co-edited with Chris Walton.
- Gender and Sexuality in South African Music (Stellenbosch: SUN Press, 2005), co-edited with Chris Walton.
