= Four Jacks and a Jill =

- Origin: South Africa
- Genres: Folk rock
- Years active: 1964–1983, 2000–present

Four Jacks and a Jill is a South African folk rock ensemble.

== Career ==
They originally formed in 1964 without a "Jill" under the name "The Nevadas". Subsequently, they became the first group in South Africa to wear their hair long and they changed their name to "The Zombies" (different from the well-known British group). Later they added lead singer Glenys Lynne and changed the group's name to "Four Jacks and A Jill". The group included Clive Harding (bass guitar), Keith Andrews (rhythm guitar and organ), replaced by the late Mark Poulos (guitar and organ) during 1966–1967 and subsequently Till Hanneman who joined in 1967 (rhythm guitar, organ and trumpet), Bruce Bark (lead guitar, harmonica and saxophone), Tony Hughes (drums) and Glenys Lynne (lead vocal and organ). In South Africa, they had a hit song, "Timothy". In 1968 they cracked the American charts with the song "Master Jack", hitting the Billboard Hot 100 at No. 18 and reaching No. 3 on the Adult Contemporary chart. The song also reached No. 10 on Cashbox and went to No. 1 in South Africa, Canada, Australia, New Zealand, Malaysia, and Rhodesia (now Zimbabwe). The follow-up single, "Mr. Nico", peaked at No. 98 in the United States. That was their last hit in the U.S., but the group continued to score hits in their native country.

They have recorded and produced albums for a range of sing-along educational story books for various South African charities.

== Members ==
Bass Guitar:

- Clive Harding (1965 – 1983) *Original Member

Lead Vocals:

- Glenys Lynne Mynott/Harding - Lead Vocals (1965 – 1983) *Original Member

Drums:

- Tony Hughes/Rouse (1965 – 1982) *Original Member
- Mossie Christopher Hills (1982 – 1983)

Guitar:

- Bruce Bark (1965 – 1969) *Original Member
- Marc Paulos (1966 – 1967)
- Till Hannemann (1967 – 1969)
- Pierre van Riel (1969 – 1978)
- Keith Lansom (1969 – 1971)
- Josh Sklair (1973 – 1976)
- Paul De Villiers (1973)
- John Emmott (1976 – 1977)
- Nigel Surtees (1977)
- Paul Nissen (1978 – 1980)
- John Ferrier (1980 – 1983)
- Len Dippenaar (1980 – 1983)

Trumpet:

- Keith Andrews (1965 – 1966) *Original Member

Piano:

- Cedric Hornby (1971 – 1973)
- Mike Nettmann (1973 – 1975)

Keyboard:

- Brian Rubenstein (1975 – 1976)
- Neill Pienaar (1976 – 1980)
- Glynn Storm (1976)

== Discography ==
=== Albums ===
List of studio albums, showing all relevant details
Year	Title	Peak chart positions	Record Label
Year	Title	Billboard 200	Record Label
1965	Jimmy Come Lately	–	RCA Victor
1966	Listen! Listen!	–	RCA Victor
1967	The House with the White Washed Gables	–	RCA Victor
1967	Timothy and Other Hits	–	RCA Victor
1968	Master Jack	155	RCA Victor
1968	Fables	–	RCA Victor
1976	Sell a Million	–	Gallo Record Company

=== Singles ===
Year	Title	Peak chart positions				Record Label	B-side	Album
Year	Title	US	AC	SA	AUS	Record Label	B-side	Album
1965	"Jimmy Come Lately"	–	–	2	–	RCA Victor	"Can't Help Lovin' You"	Jimmy Come Lately
1967	"The House with the White Washed Gables"	–	–	20	–	RCA Victor	"Walk the World"	The House with the White Washed Gables
1967	"Timothy"	–	–	1	–	RCA Victor	"Leaves Are Falling"	Master Jack
1967	"Master Jack"	18	3	1	18	RCA Victor	"I Looked Back"	Master Jack
1968	"Mister Nico"	98	25	12	81	RCA Victor	"Sunny Side of Somewhere"	Master Jack
1968	"Hey Mister"	130	34	–	–	RCA Victor	"Sad Little Pidgeon"	Fables
1969	"Grandfather Dugan"	–	–	–	–	RCA Victor	"Stone in My Shoe"	
1969	"Pretty Belinda"	–	–	–	–	RCA Victor	"Makin' Music"	
1971	"Ketchup on My Ice Cream"	–	–	–	–	RCA Victor	"Old Soul"	
1973	"Universal Feeling"	–	–	11	–	Epidemic Records	"If All the World Were Apple Pie"	
1973	"Jack-A-Dandy"	–	–	–	–	Ariola Records	"Love"	
1975	"Sell a Million"	–	–	–	–	Delta Records	"Sweet Sweet Lovin'"	Sell a Million

=== Special Releases ===
==== Gospel Albums ====
- A Time For Giving Volume 1 (Jill Music Publishers, 2004)
- A Time For Giving Volume 2 (Jill Music Publishers, 2004)
- A Time Of Faith Volume 1 (Jill Music Publishers)
- A Time Of Faith Volume 2 (Jill Music Publishers)

==== Supporting Animal Anti-Cruelty League ====
- The Adventures of Tony and Friends - Volume 1 (Jill Music Publishers, 2004)
- The Adventures of Tony and Friends - Volume 2 (Jill Music Publishers, 2004)
- The Adventures of Tony and Friends - Volume 3 (Jill Music Publishers, 2004)
- The Adventures of Tony and Friends - Volume 4 (Jill Music Publishers, 2009)
- The Adventures of Tony and Friends - Volume 5 (Jill Music Publishers, 2011)

==== Supporting Institute for the Blind ====
- The Adventures of Angel and Friends - Volume 1 (Jill Music Publishers, 2004)
- The Adventures of Angel and Friends - Volume 2 (Jill Music Publishers, 2006)

==== Supporting National St Giles Association ====
- The Adventures of Peter and Friends - Volume 1 (Jill Music Publishers, 2004)
- The Adventures of Peter and Friends - Volume 2 (Jill Music Publishers, 2009)
- The Adventures of Peter and Friends - Volume 3 (Jill Music Publishers, 2013)

==== Supporting National Council for Persons with Disabilities ====
- On Tour with The New Jeans - Volume 1 (2011)
- On Tour with The New Jeans - Volume 2 (2012)

==== Instrumental Albums ====
- An African Tapestry (2007)
- Music to Drive By (2008)
- Ornaments of the Sky (2008)
- Escape to Africa (2009)
- Birds in Song (2010)
- An African Farm (2011)
- An African Safari (2011)
- Seasons (2013)
- Oceans (2013)
- Towards Egypt (2014)
- On My Walk (2014)
- By My Side (2014)
- Dreams (2014)
- Love Songs (2014)

== In popular culture ==
In the mockumentary film This is Spinal Tap, the character Lt. Robert Hookstratten recommends Four Jacks and a Jill to the members of Spinal Tap.
