= Master Jack =

Single by Four Jacks and a Jill

from the album Master Jack
- B-side: "I Looked Back"
- Released: 1967 (SA); February 1968 (US)
- Genre: Folk rock
- Length: 2:50
- Label: RCA Victor 9473
- Songwriter: David Marks
- Producer: Ray Walter

Four Jacks and a Jill singles chronology
"Timothy" (1967)	"Master Jack" (1967)	"Mister Nico" (1968)

"Master Jack" is a song written by David Marks and first recorded by Four Jacks and a Jill. It reached #1 in South Africa and Canada (2 weeks at #1), #3 on the US adult contemporary chart, and #18 on both the Billboard chart and in Australia in 1968. The song was also released in the United Kingdom as a single, but it did not chart. It also featured on the group's 1968 album of the same name.

The lyrics assert the right of individuals to their own interpretation of the world regardless of how "Master Jack" presents it to them. Upon release, the track was widely taken as a criticism of pro-apartheid propaganda promulgated by the white minority ruling party. In this context, the titular "Master Jack" could be interpreted as a reference to a leading politician, B. J. Vorster, who styled himself "John" Vorster and became prime minister of the apartheid regime in 1966.

The official origin story, however, is different. As related by their female vocalist, "In certain mines the foreman is called 'Master Jack', and the song tells the story of a labourer who works diligently for this master for years and years and then decides to go out on his own and exercise his desires and aspirations as an individual to be something other than a labourer."

The song was produced by Ray Walter.

== Other versions ==
- Trini Lopez, as a single in 1968.
- Heidi Brühl, in German, as the B-side to her 1968 single, "La bambola".
- Laura Lee, as the B-side to her 1968 single, "Love in Every Room".
- Ayshea, as a single in 1971.
