= Tim Scott (guitarist) =

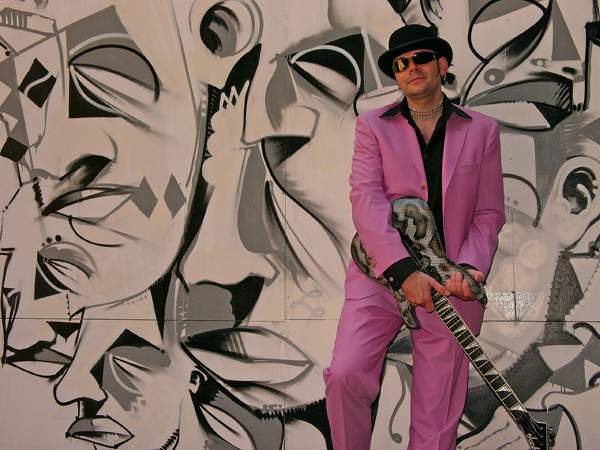
- Scott holding a Jackson Guitar, 2009

Background information
- Born: Timothy Scott; Hazel Grove, Stockport, England
- Genres: Instrumental; experimental; rock; pop; dance; funk; jazz; fusion
- Occupations: Musician; composer; producer
- Instruments: Guitar; classical guitar; bass; drums; percussion; keyboards
- Years active: 2003–present
- Label: Acer
- Website: timscott.co.uk

Timothy Scott is an instrumental recording artist primarily known for his solo instrumental guitar compositions.

== Early life ==
Scott was born and brought up in Hazel Grove, a suburb of Stockport, England. He attended Hazel Grove High School and Salford College of Music, but "dropped out before he got kicked out", finding that he could not cope with the written work due to his dyslexia. He later studied for a diploma at The Guitar Institute, London (now known as The Institute of Contemporary Music Performance).

== Music career ==
Scott's music career began in 2003 when he self-released his debut album Bald on the Inside via Acer Records set up in 2002 and named after Scott's private recording studio. He distributed the album through the bookstores Borders across the UK, where he also performed live sets. The album peaked inside their top 200 sellers list and received generally positive reviews.

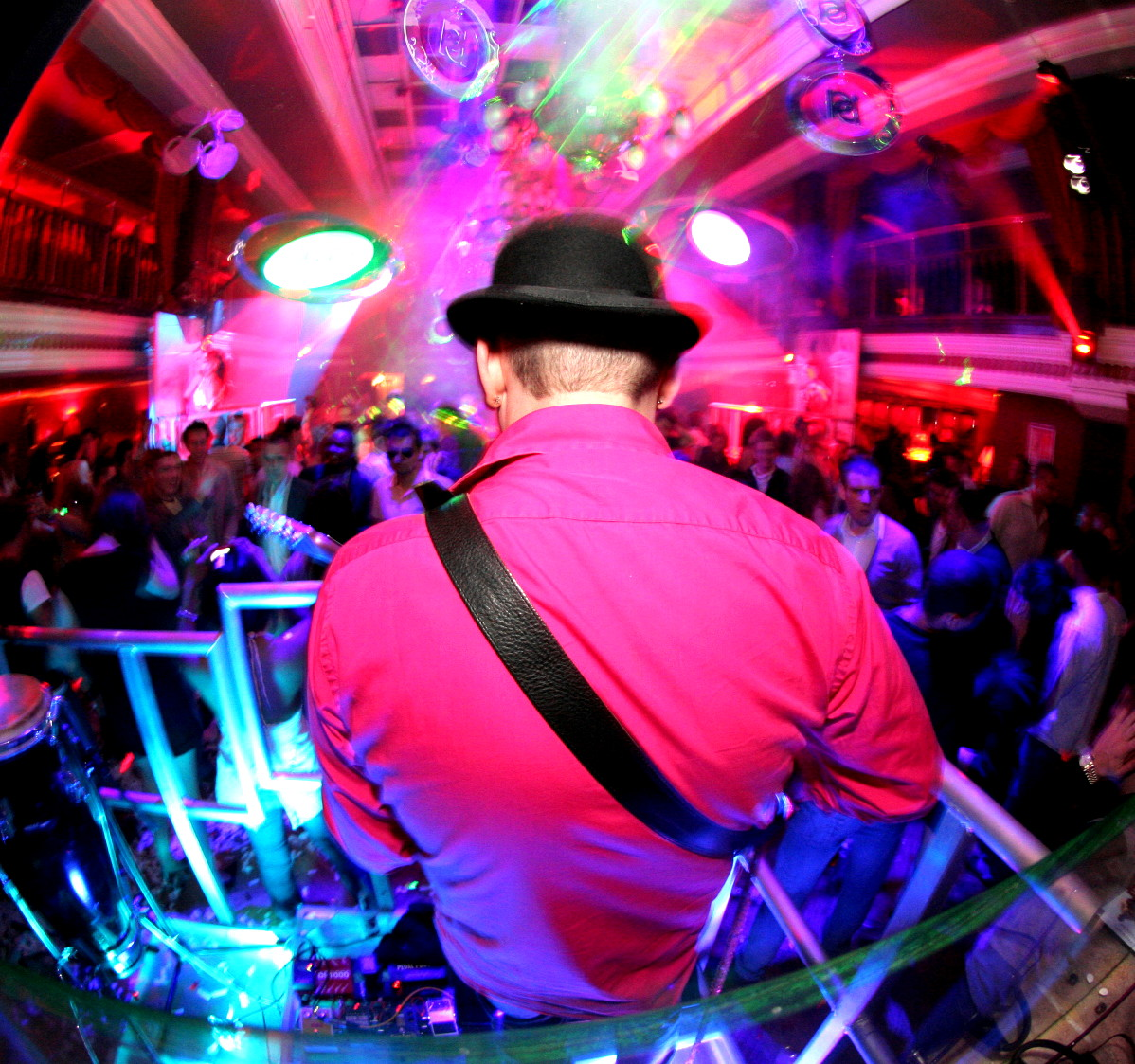
Scott performing in 2007.

The Bald on the Inside press reviews opened the opportunity for Scott to work with BBC Radio 1 DJ Judge Jules, writing and performing on the instrumental guitar track "Puesta Del Sol" for Judge Jules' debut album Proven Worldwide. Scott played live guitar over his backroom Funky House/Dirty Electro DJ set during the BBC Radio 1 weekend in Ibiza on 15 and 16 August 2005. From 2005–2008 Scott performed at clubs in Ibiza and the UK, alongside Judge Jules and other artists such as Jon Fitz and Katherine Ellis.

Scott's second solo album, Guitar Mashing, was released on 26 November 2008. The album was critically well-received, with Total Guitar describing Scott's music as a blend between "guitar mastery (think Vai and Satriani) with chilled Ibiza sounds". Since the release of Guitar Mashing Scott had been releasing digital singles, beginning with "Amy Jane", which was released in late 2009 to positive reviews. The grouped release of "Amy Jane", "Angel Dust" and "4:AM" singles and the digital release of Bald on the Inside all in November 2009, were all encompassed under the Acer Records umbrella.

At the end of July 2010, Scott took delivery of Jackson Soloist, a custom-made guitar described by The Manchester Evening News as his one-off sparkly pink Custom Shop Jackson Guitar in his signature shade…".

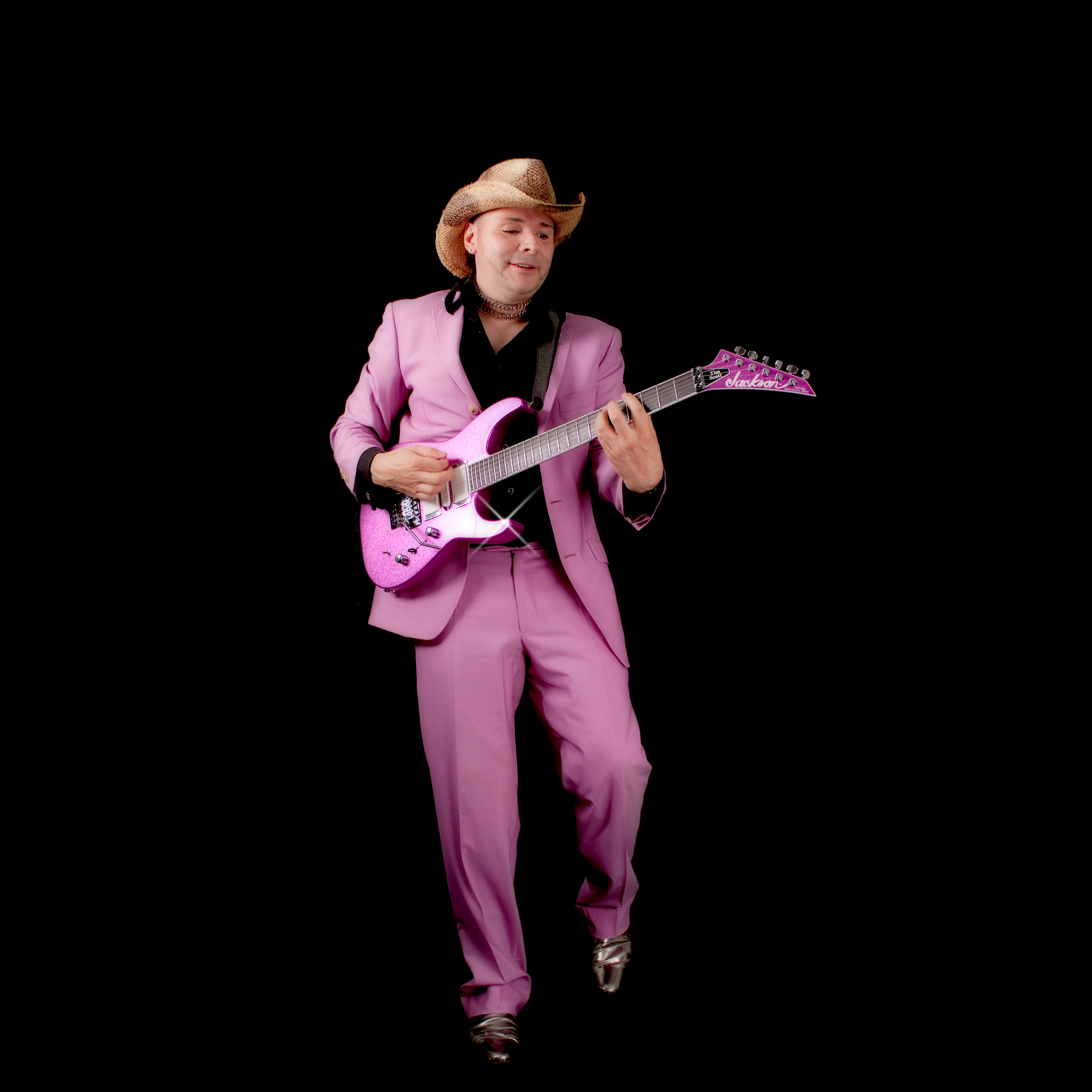
Tim Scott with his signature Jackson Soloist guitar

== Discography ==
=== Studio albums ===
Year	Album	Info
1997	Retrospective Guitar Mashing	
2003	Bald on the Inside	
2008	Guitar Mashing	
2011	Ibiza Mayhem 2012 (rebranded in 2025 to - Ibiza Mayhem Twenty Twelve)	
2014	Guitar Mashing Decade	
2014	Ultimate Miami Dance Guitar	
2017	Scott Mashing	
2017	Driving Rock Anthems (Instrumental Road Trip)	
2018	Ibiza Summer House (Sunset Beach Vibes)	
2018	Synesthesia	
2020	88025	
2023	Tim Scott	
2023	Extended	

=== EPs ===
Year	EP	Info
2011	Ibiza Mayhem	
2012	Magnesium Black	

=== Singles ===
Year	Single	Info
2003	4:AM	
2008	Angel Dust	
2009	Amy Jane	
2010	Cosmic Ignition	
2010	Cataclysmic Pink	
2011	One Life	
2011	Rio Gold Dust	
2011	Dirty Mule	
2011	Ibiza Mayhem	
2012	Magnesium Black	
2012	Rok1	
2012	Jelly Skeletons	
2012	Skye Surfing	
2012	I Found Love	
2013	Fly Away [feat. Ruthybabez]	
2013	I Don't Wanna Be	
2013	Harmonic Elevator	
2014	Without U	
2014	Ibiza’s Secret Garden	
2014	Angel Dust (Strings)	
2015	Gorton Monastery	
2015	Bring on the Night	
2016	Chasing Sunrise	
2017	Snowflakes in June	
2017	New Moon on Sunday (Blue Jean 88025 Mix)	
2018	Es Vedrà	
2018	El Toro	
2018	Justification	
2018	Screen Zombie	
2019	Cala d’Hort	
2019	Indigo Beach	
2019	Summer	
2019	Summer (Extended Mix)	
2019	Sahara	
2019	Sahara (Extended Mix)	
2020	Appassionato	
2020	Mr Lilac	
2020	Mr Lilac (Extended Mix)	
2020	Scott Funky	
2020	Sodium Amber	
2020	Sodium Amber (Extended Mix)	
2021	Glass Zebra	
2021	Glass Zebre (Extended)	
2021	Roller Skating	
2021	Roller Skating (Extended)	
2021	The Spanish Whistler	
2022	God's Heart	
2022	God's Heart (Extended)	
2022	Escape To Paradise	
2022	Escape To Paradise (Extended)	
2022	Escape To Paradise (Club Mix)	
2022	Luna Blue Sky	
2022	Luna Blue Sky (Extended)	
2022	Endless Summer	
2022	Endless Summer (Extended)	
2022	On Christmas Day	
2023	Floating Away	
2023	The Last Goodbye	
2024	Opus 119	
2024	Opus 119 (Extended)	
2024	Spiekeroog	
2025	Blue Sky Turquoise Sea	
2025	Summer Rain	
2026	Down in San José	
2026	One World Together	

== Session and collaboration discography ==
=== Studio albums ===
Year	Album	Artist	Track Info
2006	Proven Worldwide	Judge Jules	"Puesta Del Sol" (Track 6) - features a Flamenco Guitar melody written and played by Tim Scott - recorded at Acer Studios allmusic "Proven Worldwide"
2006	VS	Mike Koglin	"Mercury" (Track 3) - features an Electric Guitar melody written and played by Tim Scott - recorded at Fortress Studio's, London
2009	Bring The Noise	Judge Jules	"City Rockers (Marcus Twiddle Edit)" (Track 8) - features the guitar melody from "Ibiza's Secret Garden" - (Track 2) on Tim Scott's Guitar Mashing album

=== Singles ===
Year	Single	Artist	Track Info
2006	"Grace of God"	One Hit Wonders	"Serial Diva Remix" (Track 5) - features a rolling bass line written played and recorded by Tim Scott at Acer Studios Discogs "Grace Of God"
