= Rhythm (music magazine) =

- Categories: Music
- Frequency: 6-week cycle
- Publisher: Beats Network Ltd
- Total circulation: 8,097
- First issue: 1985
- Country: United Kingdom
- Based in: England
- Language: English
- Website: www.rhythmdrumnetwork.com
- ISSN: 0957-6592
- OCLC: 1065240190

Rhythm was a print drumming and percussion magazine based in England, the United Kingdom. Launched in 1985, it was published by Music Maker Publications until 1997 and then by Future plc until April 2019. Rhythm was relaunched at the end of November 2019 by a new publisher, Lifestyle Media House, and moved to Beats Network Ltd in September 2020. It ceased publication in November 2021. It was formerly the best-selling drumming magazine in the UK.

The magazine features gear reviews, artist interviews, playing tutorials, event coverage, news and features every issue and is published 10 times a year (1 issue every 5/6 weeks) and was available in both print format and digital as an app or a web version.

In November 2020, Rhythm released Issue 297, its much-anticipated Neil Peart tribute issue, and the first issue to be published under Beats Network Ltd. The follow-up issue, 298, was out on 22 January 2021. Issue 299, out 9 March, featured Taylor Hawkins (Foo Fighters and Taylor Hawkins and the Coattail Riders) as guest editor.

Regular contributors included Geoff Nicholls (Rhythm's longest-running contributor), David West, Rich Chamberlain (front section editor), Pete Riley (tuition section editor), Jason Bowld, Pete Lockett, Colin Woolway, Erik Stams, Mike Sturgis, Emily Dolan Davies and Tom Bradley (gear editor).

In August 2010, Rhythm launched an online poll to find the Greatest Drummer of the Last 25 Years. After more than 100,000 votes, Slipknot’s Joey Jordison was crowned as the winner, having taken more than 38,000 of the votes. In response to the award, Jordison told Rhythm: “This is bigger than a Grammy to me! You people keep me alive, I can't thank all of you enough. To all the Rhythm staff, thank you, you are amazing! Thank you to my family, friends, all the amazing drummers I was in company with, without them I wouldn't be here either and last but not least, all my brothers in Slipknot! Thank you all again!"

Rhythm celebrated its 25th anniversary in its September 2010 issue. The issue included birthday messages from drummers including Nick Mason, Chad Smith, Joey Jordison, Mike Portnoy, Terry Bozzio, Stewart Copeland, Vinnie Colaiuta, Neil Peart and Nicko McBrain.

== Tuition CD ==
As well as interviews, news, and gear reviews, Rhythm also contained a tuition section and CD and later DVD full of a wide range of musical styles each month. As of 2010, how-to-play lessons included tracks by artists such as the Beatles, Michael Jackson, Kasabian, Fleetwood Mac, Rage Against the Machine, Aerosmith and the Ramones. The Rhythm CD also featured guest lessons from top artists, with previous lessons coming from Will Calhoun (Living Colour), Dave Mackintosh (DragonForce) and Johnny Jenkins (Lily Allen). Jason Bowld (Pitchshifter/Slaves to Gravity) also presented a series of lessons called Double Kick Drills.

== Editorial team (Nov 2020 Relaunch) ==
- Editor: Louise King
- Art Editor: Richard Page
- Publisher and Managing Editor: Ondine Barry

== Editorial team (Future plc) ==
- Editor: Chris Barnes
- Art editor: Dave Tupper
- Production editor: Chris Burke
- Staff writer: Rich Chamberlain
