= Guitarist (magazine) =

British monthly guitar magazine

- Cover of the December 2024 issue, featuring Gibson Les Paul Junior
- Editor: Jamie Dickson
- Categories: Music
- Frequency: Monthly
- Publisher: Future plc
- Total circulation (2024): 14,000
- Founded: 1984
- Country: United Kingdom
- Based in: Bath
- Language: English
- Website: www.guitarist.co.uk
- ISSN: 0953-7023
- OCLC: 44012331

Guitarist is a British monthly music-making magazine published by Future plc. First published in 1984, It is the longest-established European guitar-player magazine and is currently the biggest-selling guitar magazine in the UK. Editor Jamie Dickson has had the position since late 2013. Each issue covers three areas: reviews, interview and technique. This may include reviews of newly released guitars, amplifiers and other equipment; interviews with famous and up-and-coming guitar players; and features on the guitar industry, news articles, playing technique with tablature. Guitarist's slogan was previously "The Guitar Player's Bible", before changing in 2012 to "The Guitar Magazine".

== Gear reviews ==
The gear reviews section is produced by writers such as Dave Burrluck, Neville Marten and Mick Taylor. The segment hosts guitar equipment reviews of both major and boutique manufacturers from around the world. As well as electric guitars and acoustic guitars, the magazine also reviews guitar amplifiers, effects pedals, electric basses and various pro-audio and recording equipment applicable to guitar players.

Gear reviews within the magazine comprise two distinct elements. First Play reviews are located near the front of the magazine and generally focus on high-end products. These reviews place an emphasis on photography but often do not contain the same level of detail as the Feature Reviews, located in the back half of each issue. These reviews are highly detailed and may include behind-the-scenes interviews or an exploration of the instrument's history.

Where applicable, all the gear reviewed in Guitarist is accompanied by a video demonstration of that product, produced by the magazine's in-house team and often featuring the reviewer. These videos are either a simple demonstration of the product's features, or a short piece of original music created using the product. Occasionally, the magazine includes a discussion about the featured guitar between members of the Guitarist team, with example performances interspersed throughout. These video demos were previously accessed via the Guitarist CD/DVD, or the online Guitarist Vault download archive. From 2014, however, the video demos have been available as a private YouTube playlist, accessed via a direct link printed in each issue.

In addition to gear reviews, each issue also features an in-depth Q&A section, where reader's technical queries and problems are answered by Guitarist's experts, as well as a long-term test section, where members of the Guitarist team take recently reviewed products on a six-month trial to see how they feature in the real world.

== Features and artists ==
Guitarist has focused primarily on blues, folk and classic rock and metal when it comes to interviews and features. In recent years, the title has broadened its scope to include artists from a wide array of guitar-focused genres, including alternative rock, modern metal, progressive rock, jazz, country, shred guitar and many others.

Artist interviews in Guitarist generally have a greater focus on guitars than a typical music magazine. Discussions of the artist's playing style, gear choices and general attitude to the guitar are commonplace. Occasionally, the artist will demonstrate a performance on a guitar, which is then available to view on the Guitarist YouTube channel. Recent artists who have been featured in Guitarist include: Joe Perry, Jimmy Page, Marc Ford, Joe Bonamassa, Charlie Hunter, Jackson Browne, Guthrie Govan, Jim Campilongo, Eric Johnson and Steve Vai.

In addition to artist interviews, Guitarist regularly includes feature stories on a specific guitarist, guitar or musical genre. Past examples of these features include histories of: Brian May's guitar, 'The Red Special', David Gilmour's guitar, 'Black Stratocaster', various blues musicians, slide guitar, the Fender Stratocaster, and the Gibson Les Paul.

== Playing and technique ==
Guitarist previously included a large technique section at the rear of the magazine with columns reflecting a wide array of different guitar styles. However, in recent years, this has been reduced to a single regular column, the long-running Blues Headlines with long-time Guitar Techniques and Guitarist contributor Richard Barrett.

Though the magazine now features fewer monthly technique columns, 'style files' have been introduced to the technique section. These style files are often focused on an artist interview or history feature, and are designed to allow the reader to learn the playing style of the artist or genre featured therein. An example of this is the 'Aces' feature, which covers various famous electric guitar players. The feature comprises a history of the artist's life and contribution to guitar music, which is then followed by a style file encapsulating his key innovations and stylistic techniques.

All tuition content in the magazine is accompanied by tablature of each lesson or example, as well as video and audio content, including backing tracks, to make learning easier.

== Video and audio content ==
Every month, Guitarist produces video demos of all of the products reviewed in the magazine that month, video interviews and features with guitar artists, audio examples for the Blues Headlines tuition column, and video and audio examples to accompany any other tuition featured in the magazine that month. These regularly include 'play in the style of' columns, as well as video masterclasses with famous guitar players such as Joe Bonamassa.

These videos are available to watch online via the private YouTube playlist link featured in the magazine each month. With the iPad version of the magazine, all video and audio content is embedded to watch offline.

== Digital versions ==
Since late-2011, Guitarist has been available to purchase in digital forms - initially only on Apple iPad, but later on Android devices, iPhones and the Kindle Fire.

Originally, a bespoke Guitarist Deluxe edition of the magazine was produced for the iPad. Launching to coincide with the introduction of Apple Newsstand, it was a fully enhanced digital edition of the magazine, with fully interactive audio and video content, pages specifically designed to be read on the iPad, and various other multimedia features. This was discontinued in late 2012, and the magazine moved to its current page based format.

On Android, Kindle and Zinio devices, the digital edition of Guitarist is a simple digital facsimile of the print product, though the iOS Newsstand version is enhanced with embedded video and audio content, as well as image galleries.

== Other products ==
In addition to the regular magazine, Guitarist produces a number of one-off and semi-regular editions. These have included 100 Great Guitar Players, 100 Great Guitars, The Guitarist Guide To Effects and The Guitarist Guide To Home Recording.

In late 2013, Guitarist launched a quarterly sister-title, named Guitarist Presents Acoustic. This title provides the same mix of gear reviews, interviews and playing tuition as the primary title, but covers only acoustic guitars and guitar players.

== Sister titles ==
Guitarist was purchased by Future Publishing from Music Maker Publications in 1997, and became part of the company's Music Making portfolio, which included guitar titles Total Guitar and Guitar Techniques, as well as Rhythm, Future Music, and Computer Music. From 2008 onward, Future made Guitarist part of their MusicRadar website. In January 2020, GuitarWorld.com became the new online home for Guitarist, along with sister titles Total Guitar, Guitar Techniques and Bass Player.

== Current editorial team ==
- Editor-in-Chief: Jamie Dickson
- Deputy Editor: David Mead
- Reviews Editor: Dave Burrluck
- Managing Editor: Lucy Rice
- Art Editor: Darren Phillips
- Senior Music Editor: Jason Sidwell
