= Documentation Centre for Music =

Part of the music library at Stellenbosch University, Wester Cape, South Africa

The Documentation Centre for Music (DOMUS) forms part of the Special Collections Division of the Music Library within the Stellenbosch University Library and Information Service and is located in the Music Department. Collections acquired through acquisitions, donations or bequests over more than 50 years form the main holdings and are mostly of South African but also of international significance.

== History ==
The Documentation Centre for Music, at the Stellenbosch University Library and Information Service, was founded in 2005 by Prof. Stephanus Muller. Having worked from 2002 to order and catalogue the archive of the composer Arnold van Wyk, Muller proposed the creation of DOMUS in order to ensure the preservation of music collections and their unlocking for music research. After obtaining institutional support from the Department of Music and the Stellenbosch University Library and Information Service, Muller appointed Santie de Jongh as DOMUS archivist in the second half of 2005, and functioned as Head of DOMUS from 2005 until 2016, when he unbundled the archival and intellectual functions of DOMUS with the creation of Africa Open Institute for Music, Research and Innovation (in 2016) and DOMUS formally became a Special Collection of the Music Library, Stellenbosch University.

Between 2005 and 2016, DOMUS embarked on an ambitious programme of archival acquisitions and research-related activities. With its founding in 2005, there were 20 collections in the Music Library. These included the literary estate of internationally celebrated composer and conductor Albert Coates and the music library of bibliophile Michael Scott. At the end of its first decade, the number of collections had grown to 70, including the documentary collections of important South African composers, performing artists, musicologists and music institutions. Significantly, these acquisitions had broadened the diversity of music held in the archive and studied by music researchers and students. Whereas previously the special collections of the Music Library had held only Western art music materials (complementing the focus on such music in the Music Department), DOMUS acquired popular music archives (among others the archives of Anton Goosen and Taliep Petersen, substantial materials on boeremusiek and musicians like Nico Carstens, the archives of record companies like Mountain Records and extensive archival collections documenting unwritten histories of South African music, like David Marks's Hidden Years Music Archive), as well as archives relating to different media in which music played an important role (for example the archive of filmmaker, artist and writer Aryan Kaganof). DOMUS also continued to acquire the archives of important Western art music composers, like Graham Newcater, John Simon, Stefans Grové, Hubert du Plessis, Christopher Langford James and Michael Blake.

Six of the collections in DOMUS are available as digitized collections on open access at These include the collections of Albert Coates (630 items), Christopher James (30 items), Graham Newcater (7 items), John Simon (15 items), South African Jewish Music articles (4964 articles) and Stefans Grové (120 articles).

== DOMUS projects between 2005 and 2016 ==
During this period, Muller funded numerous research-related projects under the aegis of DOMUS. These included: Seminars hosting musicologists Marie Jorritsma and Barbara Titus (2008); a series of conversations and recordings of the isiXhosa bow player Madosini (Latozi Mpahleni) with composer Hans Huyssen (2009); analysis workshops with composer Hannes Taljaard (2009); a symposium to celebrate Kevin Volans's sixtieth birthday (2009) with contributions by pianist Jill Richards, musicologist Christine Lucia, and philosopher Jean-Pierre de la Parte, a performance of Zim Ngqawana and Kyle Shepherd in a scrap yard in Stellenbosch to showcase Aryan Kaganof's film An Exhibition of Vandalizim (2010); lectures by Raymond Holden on 'The Modern Orchestra' (2010); a piano recital by pianist Daniel-Ben Pienaar as part of the joint IMS/SASRIM conference at Stellenbosch University (2010); round table discussions The State of the Discipline (chaired by Christopher Ballantine) and Music and Exile (chaired by Jean-Pierre de la Porte) at the IMS/SASRIM conference in Stellenbosch (2010), lecture series by Jean-Pierre de la Porte entitled 'New Horizons in Composition and Research' (2010); a screening of Aryan Kaganof's and Dylan Valley's film The Uprising of Hangberg in Kayamandi in Stellenbosch; a recording of Hangberg reggae band, Blaze, at Milestone Studios in Cape Town (2010); and a symposium to celebrate Michael Blake's sixtieth birthday (2011) with contributions by composer and pianist Paul Hanmer, musicologists Stephanus Muller, Christine Lucia and George King, philosopher Jean-Pierre de la Porte, and filmmaker Aryan Kaganof.

== DOMUS after 2016 ==
Before its formal establishment as a Special Collection in the Stellenbosch University Library and Information Service in 2016, under the headship of Muller DOMUS functioned as both a music heritage preservation and a research initiative. After the creation of the Africa Open Institute (AOI) in 2016, DOMUS adopted a more conventional archival orientation in its focus on collecting, conserving/preserving, sorting and cataloguing music collections. The archive retains close links with the music research environment at Stellenbosch University, with the Senior Director of Library and Information Services serving in an ex officio capacity on the Board of AOI, and the Collections Acquisitions Committee of DOMUS retaining representation by AOI. Since 2016, AOI has continued to fund and actively mediate in the acquisition of new archives for DOMUS, including the Werner Nel papers (2019), the John Roos/Hennie Joubert archive (2019), the Rupert Mayr papers (2019) and the Pam Devereux Harris archive (2019). The Africa Open Institute has also continued to fund digitization projects in DOMUS through its 'Delinking Encounters' archive project (2016-2020), funded by the Andrew W. Mellon Foundation.

== Collections held in DOMUS ==
DOMUS houses over 70 collections. These collections that have mostly been acquired by bequest, include (excerpts from collection list):

- Andresen, Olaf
- Angove, Ivy
- Aucamp, Hennie
- Bailey, John
- Blake, Michael
- Bouws, Jan
- Bowman, Lionel
- Cape Philharmonic Orchestra
- Carstens, Nico
- Cillié, G.G.
- De Villiers, Dirkie
- Donald Graham Historical Sound Recordings
- Endler, Johann Franz (Hans)
- EOAN Group
- Goosen, Anton
- Grové, Stefans
- Hidden Years Music Archive
- Hartman, Anton
- International Society for Contemporary Music (NewMusicSA)
- James, Christopher
- Jannasch, Friedrich Wilhelm
- Kaganof, Aryan
- Konservatorium Collection
- Lopez-Lambrechts Collection
- Musicological Society of Southern Africa
- Nel, Werner
- Nepgen, Rosa
- Newcater, Graham
- Obelisk Music
- Petersen, Taliep
- Roos, John
- Scott, Michael
- Simon, John
- Stegmann, Frits
- Suider-Afrikaanse Kerkorrelistevereniging (SAKOV)
- Swanson, Walter
- US Choir
- Van der Linde, Bernard
- Van der Spuy, George
- Van Niekerk, Hanlie
- Van Rooyen, Bouwer
- Van Wyk, Arnold
- Weich, Charles
