= Total Guitar =

British monthly music magazine

- Cover of the final issue (November 2024)
- Categories: Music magazine
- Frequency: Monthly
- Total circulation (ABC Jul-Dec 2008): 42,171
- Founded: 1994
- Final issue: November 2024
- Company: Future plc
- Country: United Kingdom
- Based in: Bath
- Language: English
- Website: www.guitarworld.com/total-guitar
- ISSN: 1355-5049

Total Guitar was a monthly music magazine based in Bath, the United Kingdom, published from 1994 to 2024.

The magazine was owned by Future plc, who publish many other magazines ranging from drums and video games to technology magazines.

== Makeup ==
Total Guitar regularly contained tablature for rock, acoustic, punk, blues, and metal, as well as profiles of guitarists and their specific techniques and playing styles. Total Guitar was aimed at players who would like to learn how to play guitar and people who would like to develop their playing style, with tutorials in acoustic and electric guitar.

Total Guitar also had a gear reviews section that looked at the latest guitar equipment and interviews with guitarists from all genres and levels of playing.

The Learn To Play section of Total Guitar covered songs from beginner level through to intermediate. For most of its existence, the magazine also came with a free CD each issue, with backing tracks and demonstration tracks to accompany the magazine's tablature.

== History ==
Over the years, the magazine featured many "Guest Lessons" from famous guitar players, including Australian fingerstyle player Tommy Emmanuel, blues player Joe Bonamassa, metal guitarist Zakk Wylde, Brian Setzer, Joe Trohman of Fall Out Boy, Mick Thompson and Jim Root of Slipknot, John 5, Synyster Gates and Zacky Vengeance of Avenged Sevenfold, Alex Skolnick, Mark Tremonti, of Alter Bridge, Marty Friedman, Joe Satriani, Wes Borland, Matt Tuck and Michael Paget of BFMV, and Matt Heafy and Corey Beaulieu of Trivium.

The magazine celebrated its 200th issue in April 2010, with Jimi Hendrix on the cover.

The magazine published its final issue (marked as the November 2024 issue) on the 30th anniversary of its first issue. Total Guitar's final editor, Chris Bird, died in May 2025.

== Personnel ==
The magazine's last editorial team was:

- Editor: Chris Bird
- Group Art Director: Graham Dalzell
- Content Editor: Paul Elliott
- Production Editor: Stan Bull
- Reviews Editor: Stuart Williams
- Art Editor: Jamie Schildhauer
